= Esopus Creek =

Tributary of the Hudson River in the Catskill region of New York state

Esopus Creek Esopus Kill, Saugerties Creek
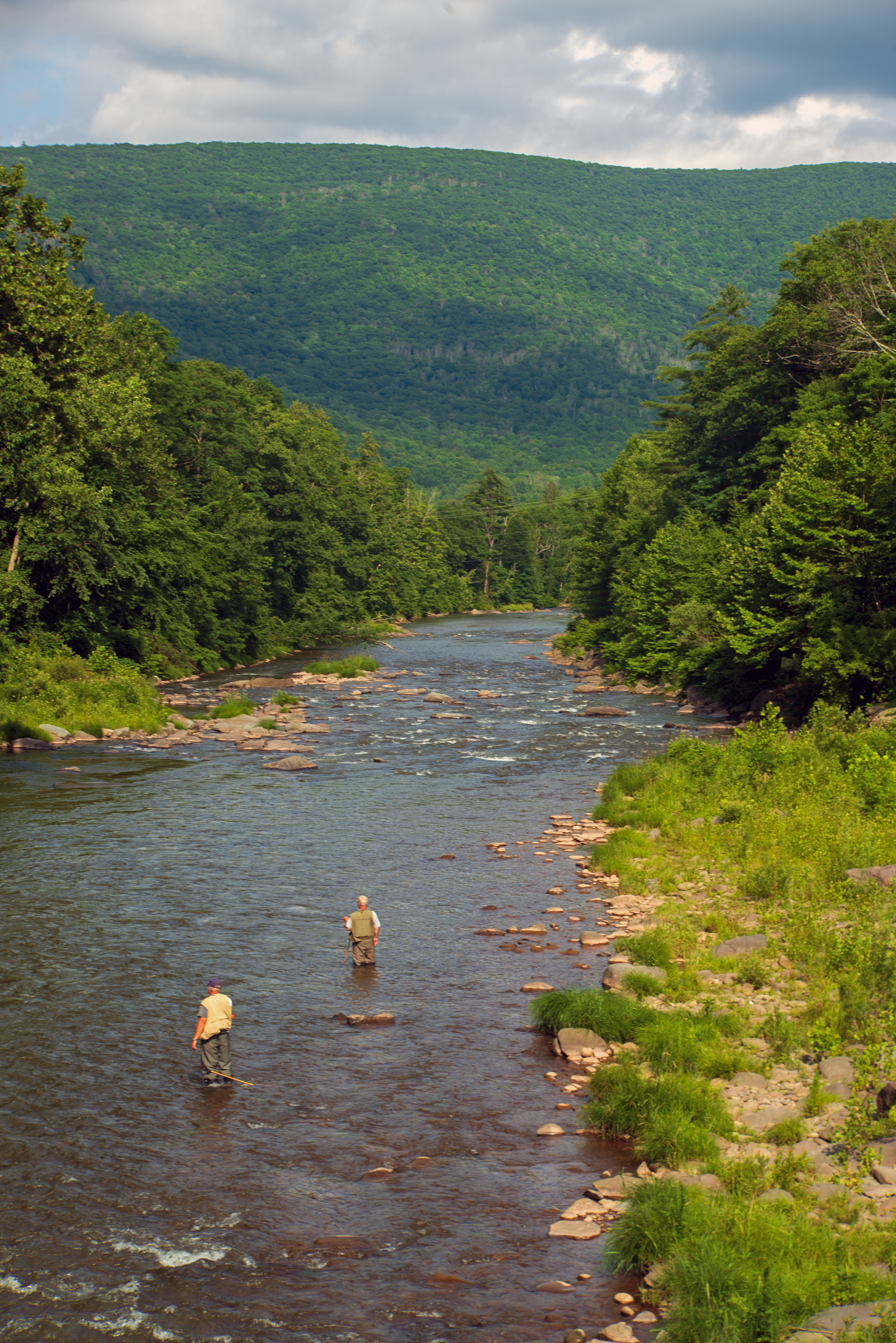
- Anglers in the Esopus near Phoenicia, with Mount Tremper in the background, 2020

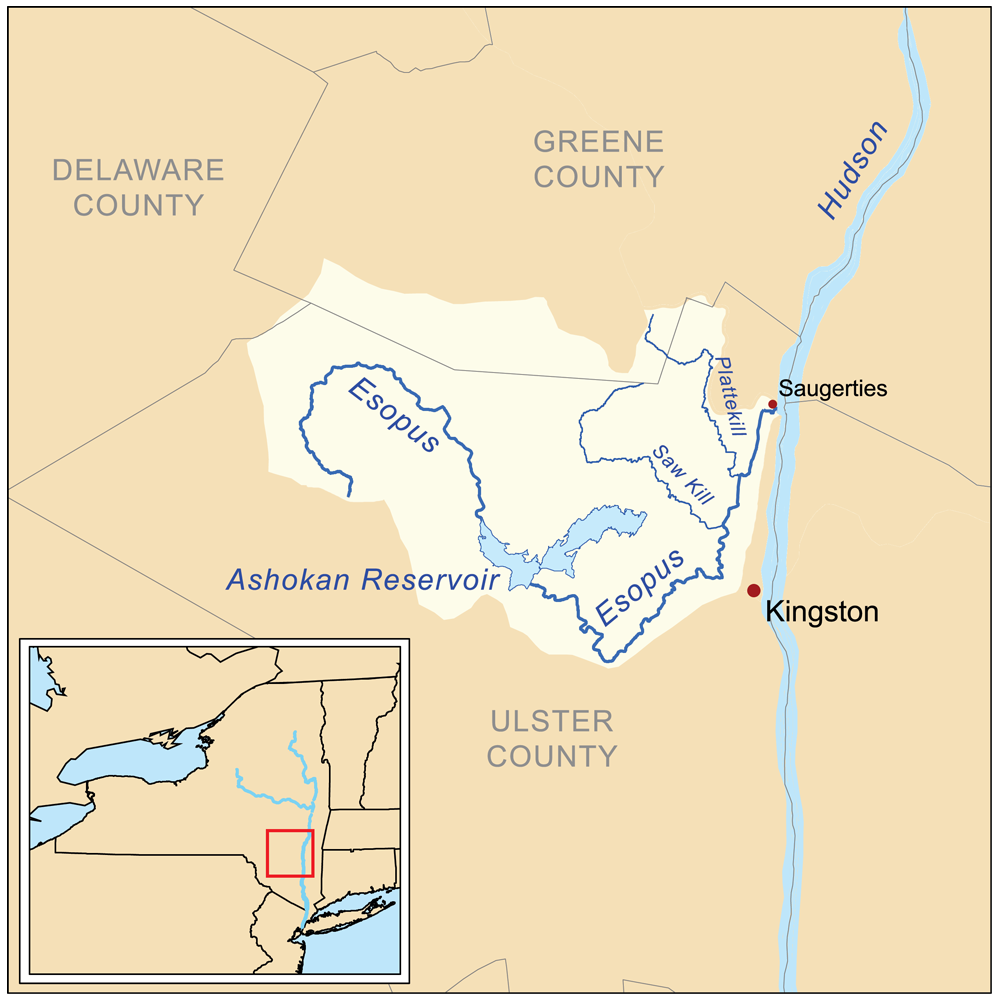
- Map of Esopus Creek and its watershed
- Etymology: Local Lenape tribe; variously translated as "little river" or "high banks"
- Native name: Atkarkaton, Atkankarten (Munsee)

Location
- Country: United States
- State: New York
- Region: Catskills, Hudson Valley
- County: Ulster
- Towns: Shandaken, Olive, Marbletown, Hurley, Ulster, Saugerties (also Phoenicia, Kingston and the village of Saugerties)

Physical characteristics
- Source: Winnisook Lake
  - location: Shandaken
  - coordinates: 42°0′55″N 74°24′45″W
  - elevation: 2,660 ft (810 m)
- Mouth: Hudson River
  - location: Saugerties
  - coordinates: 42°4′17″N 73°55′45″W
  - elevation: 1–4 ft (0.30–1.22 m)
- Length: 65.4 mi (105.3 km)
- Basin size: 425 sq mi (1,100 km^{2})
- Discharge
  - location: Coldbrook, New York
  - average: 680.8 cu ft/s (19.28 m^{3}/s)
  - maximum: 75,800 cu ft/s (2,150 m^{3}/s)
- Discharge
  - location: Mount Marion, New York
  - average: 775.4 cu ft/s (21.96 m^{3}/s)
  - minimum: 5.3 cu ft/s (0.15 m^{3}/s)
  - maximum: 30,500 cu ft/s (860 m^{3}/s)

Basin features
- River system: Hudson River
- Tributaries
  - left: Shandaken Tunnel, Stony Clove Creek, Saw Kill, Plattekill Creek
  - right: Woodland Creek
- Waterfalls: Otter Falls, Parker Falls, Blossom Falls, Glenerie Falls, Cantine Falls

Esopus Creek /ɪˈsoʊpəs/ is a 65.4-mile-long (105.3 km) tributary of the Hudson River that drains the east-central Catskill Mountains in the U.S. state of New York. From its source at Winnisook Lake on the slopes of Slide Mountain, the Catskills' highest peak, it flows across Ulster County to the Hudson at Saugerties. Many tributaries extend its watershed into neighboring Greene County and a small portion of Delaware County. Midway along its length, it is impounded at Olive Bridge to create Ashokan Reservoir, the first of several built in the Catskills as part of New York City's water supply system. Its own flow is supplemented 13 miles (21 km) above the reservoir by the Shandaken Tunnel, which carries water from the city's Schoharie Reservoir into the creek.

The creek, originally known by the Native Americans in the area as Atkarkaton or Atkankarten and by Dutch settlers as the "Esopus Kill", takes its name from the Esopus tribe of the Lenape, who were living around the lower Esopus when the Dutch first explored and settled the Hudson Valley in the early 17th century. The creek's wide valley made it an ideal trading route for the Esopus and other Lenape who harvested the beaver pelts the European traders desired. Later, under the English, it became the beginning point for contentious land claims in the mountains. After independence, the Esopus corridor became the main route into the Catskills, first by road then later by the Ulster and Delaware Railroad, for forest-product industries like logging, tanning and charcoal making. Those industries declined in the late 19th century, shortly before the creation of the Forest Preserve and the Catskill Park made the region more attractive for resorts and recreation, particularly trout fishing. The renewed Esopus also attracted the attention of fast-growing New York City, which was able to acquire land and build the reservoir and tunnel after overcoming local political opposition.

The reservoir divides the creek into an upper stretch, mostly a wild mountain stream, and a lower stretch closer to the Hudson that gradually becomes more estuarine. Above the reservoir, its water quality is closely monitored, not only for its role in the city's water supply but to preserve its local economic importance as a recreational resource. As the upper Esopus is one of the most productive trout streams in the Northeast, fly fishermen come in great numbers to take trout from its relatively accessible banks. Canoeists and kayakers have been drawn to its whitewater, which has also spawned a busy local tubing industry in the summer months. The lower Esopus is mainly an aesthetic and ecological resource, although the estuary at Saugerties is a popular bass fishery.

The Esopus's role in the state and regional economy has led to a concentrated effort to protect and manage it, particularly on the upper stretch. The interests of the various stakeholders have not always converged, particularly where it concerns the city's management of its water needs. Turbidity created by discharges from the Shandaken Tunnel after a 1996 flood led to a successful lawsuit against the city and a state regulation; downstream of the reservoir the city has been criticized for contributing to flooding problems by releasing too much water during heavy rainstorms since Hurricane Irene in 2011. Boaters and anglers have also clashed, and invasive species are beginning to enter the upper creek as well.

== Etymology ==
Historians agree that the first Dutch settlers named the stream for the Lenape band that inhabited its banks. The Lenape themselves may have called it Atkarkarton or Atkankarten, meaning "smooth land" in their language, probably in reference to a meadow alongside the river near Kingston. Lenape use of that name is recorded in 1657; it later became the name of a hamlet in the area.

From the mid-17th century Esopus, sometimes Sopers, was in common use. It was believed to have been derived from seepus, meaning river, in the Delaware languages. The name was not always applied to today's Esopus. Alphonso T. Clearwater's 1907 history of Ulster County recounts that in 1677 the local Native tribes deeded to the English the land between the Esopus, which he identifies as Saugerties Creek, and the Rondout, which he calls the "Groot Esopus". In some other accounts, the es prefix is read as a diminutive, making the name mean "little river".

Another interpretation is that Esopus means "high banks", referring to the stream's history of heavy floods.

== Course ==
The Esopus is usually discussed as an upper and lower stream divided by the reservoir. The upper portion, where most recreational use takes place, has the characteristics of a mountain stream — shallow, rocky and swift, with most of the stream's trout taken by anglers there. The upper portion is itself divided into a "small" and "big" stream by the outlet of the Shandaken Tunnel. Below the reservoir's spillway the stream begins again, becoming flatter, deeper and slower to its short estuary.

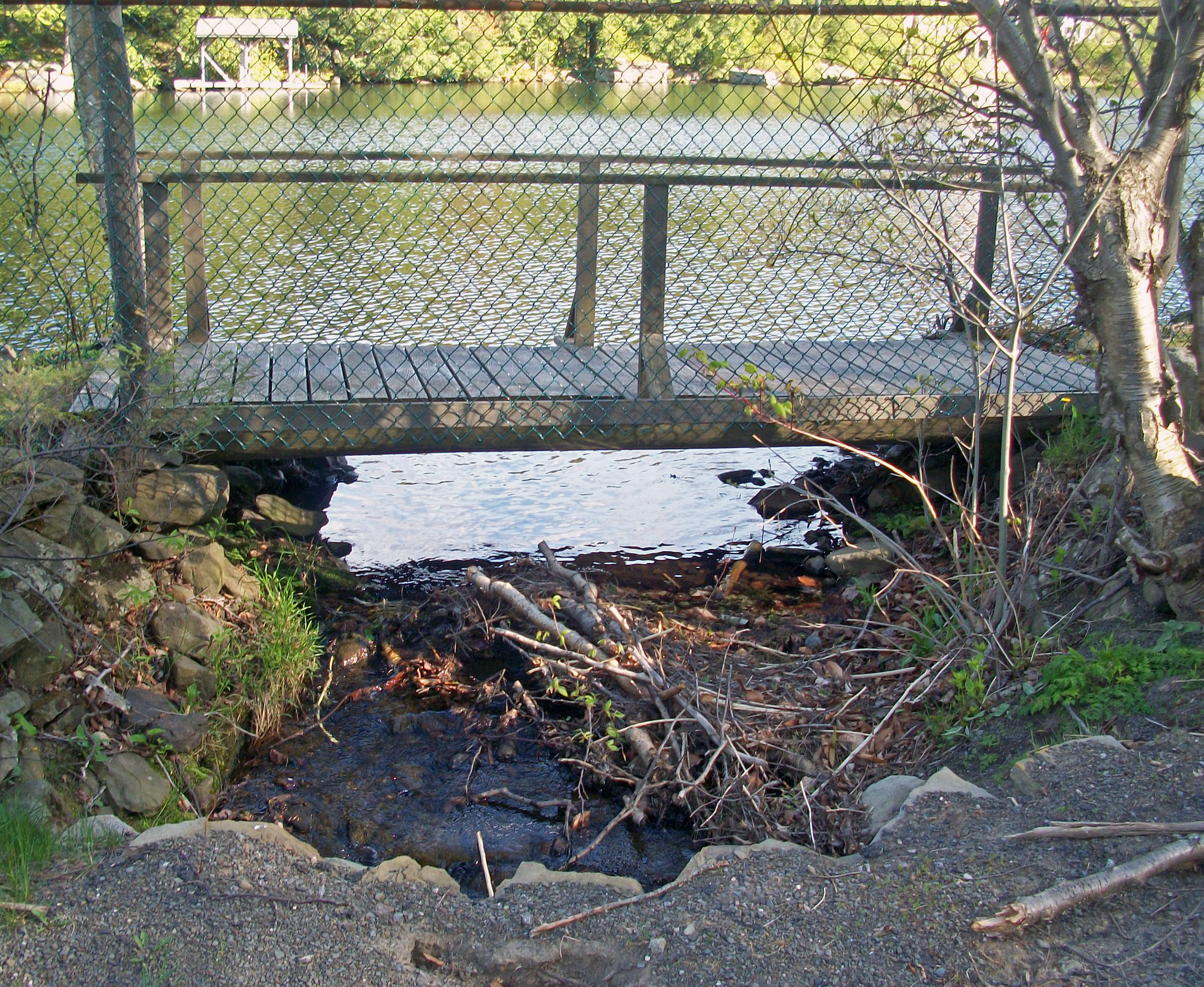
Source of the Esopus at the outflow of Winnisook Lake

=== Small upper Esopus ===
==== Winnisook Lake to Big Indian ====
The Esopus flows out of artificially created Winnisook Lake, at 2,660 feet (810 m) above sea level the highest lake in the Catskills, on the northwest slopes of Slide Mountain, the Catskills' highest peak in the town of Shandaken, within 300 feet (100 m) of the West Branch of the Neversink River on the other side of the divide between the Hudson and Delaware watersheds, amid expansive forest. At the source it is crossed by a small wooden footbridge, followed by Oliverea Road (Ulster County Route 47), which it immediately begins to parallel through the forest.

The stream's headwaters descend from there northward into Big Indian Hollow, dropping 169 feet (52 m) per mile (1.6 km) with an average slope of 13 percent, through its first three miles, a narrow and rocky mountains stream through this section. Along it there are three waterfalls—Otter Falls, and Parker and Blossom Falls below. At first trending westward, away from the road, a half-mile (800 m) below Winnisook Lake it returns to the road's side and receives its unnamed first tributary from the east, draining another of Slide's hollows.

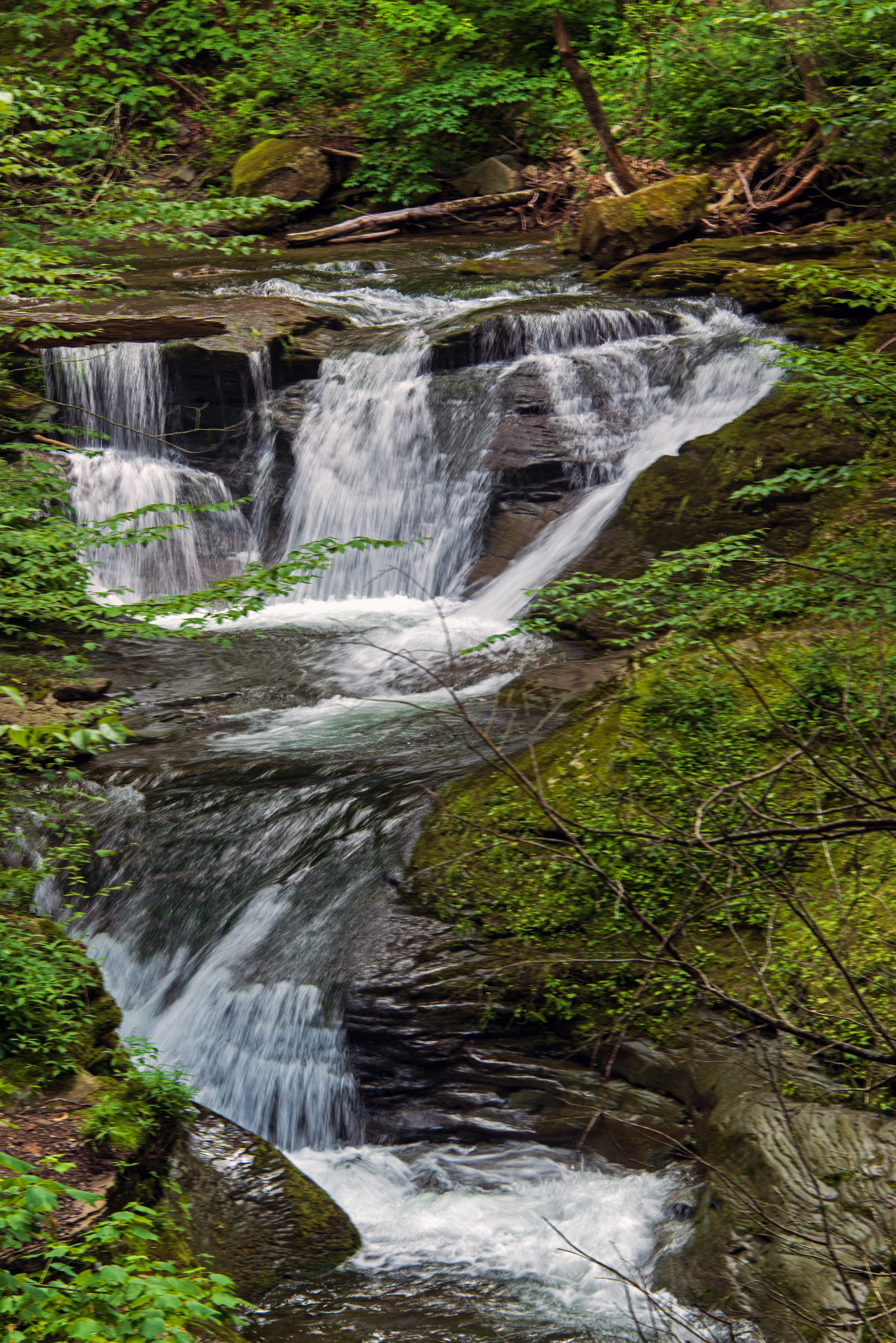
Otter Falls

Bending to the west northwest, the Esopus forms part of the boundary of the Big Indian Wilderness Area to its south as it receives Giant Ledge Stream from the north, draining the peak of that name and Panther Mountain, the former meteor crater whose walls determine the creek's upper course. Another half-mile further west, the Esopus receives its first left tributary, Hanging Birds Nest Brook, which drains the north face of Spruce and Hemlock mountains to the south.

From there the Esopus flows due northwest for its next mile, as the valley floor of Big Indian Hollow opens up and some cleared land begins to abut the stream. After the Maben Hollow Brook confluence, it turns west and braids into several smaller channels for 1,200 feet (370 m), reuniting just before crossing under Eagle Mountain Road. It receives, another eastern tributary, the Elk Bushkill, which drains Fir and Big Indian mountains to the southeast, just south of the Burnham Hollow Road bridge. The Esopus then bends back in a northward direction. Short braided sections return during the next mile, along with gravel bars along the banks.

Bending past more braided sections and bars, the Esopus reaches the small former hamlet of Oliverea 0.6 mi (1 km) further north. Here McKenley Hollow Road crosses, in a section with retaining walls on either side of the channel. Another 500 ft (150 m) to the north, the similarly named tributary, carrying water from the steep slopes of Haynes and Balsam mountains to the west, joins the Esopus from the west as the stream's main stem turns northwest, further away from the road, then curving northeast with more bars and braiding marking a wider channel.

==== Big Indian to the Portal ====
After 1.6 mi (2.6 km) of this gently curving course, Hatchery Hollow Brook flows in from the east. With the valley floor widening, the Esopus flows more northward. It receives its last Big Indian Hollow tributary, Lost Clove Creek, from the west where it drains Balsam and Bellayre mountains, just below the Lost Clove Road bridge. At the mouth of the hollow, in the small hamlet of Big Indian, 8.5 miles (13.7 km) from its source, the Esopus turns east and crosses under New York State Route 28, which it closely parallels all the way to Ashokan Reservoir, at 1,200 feet (370 m) in elevation. At the bridge, it receives Birch Creek, which drains from the small former village of Pine Hill to the west, opposite a large gravel bar, and then bends northward. The former channel of the Esopus cuts this corner, rejoining the main stem at the site of the two streams' former confluence a thousand feet (300 m) downstream.

Through this section it widens through a valley floor with more frequent cleared areas amid forested mountains, meandering gently along the circular route around Panther Mountain, paralleled by Creek Side Drive on its north. Another thousand feet downstream, Fire House Road (County Route 47) crosses, after which the Esopus turns sharply to the north, then northeast at a large gravel bar, for its next mile. At the Millbrook Hollow Brook confluence, it bends eastward, with another northern tributary, Seneca Hollow Brook emptying into the stream a half-mile further along.

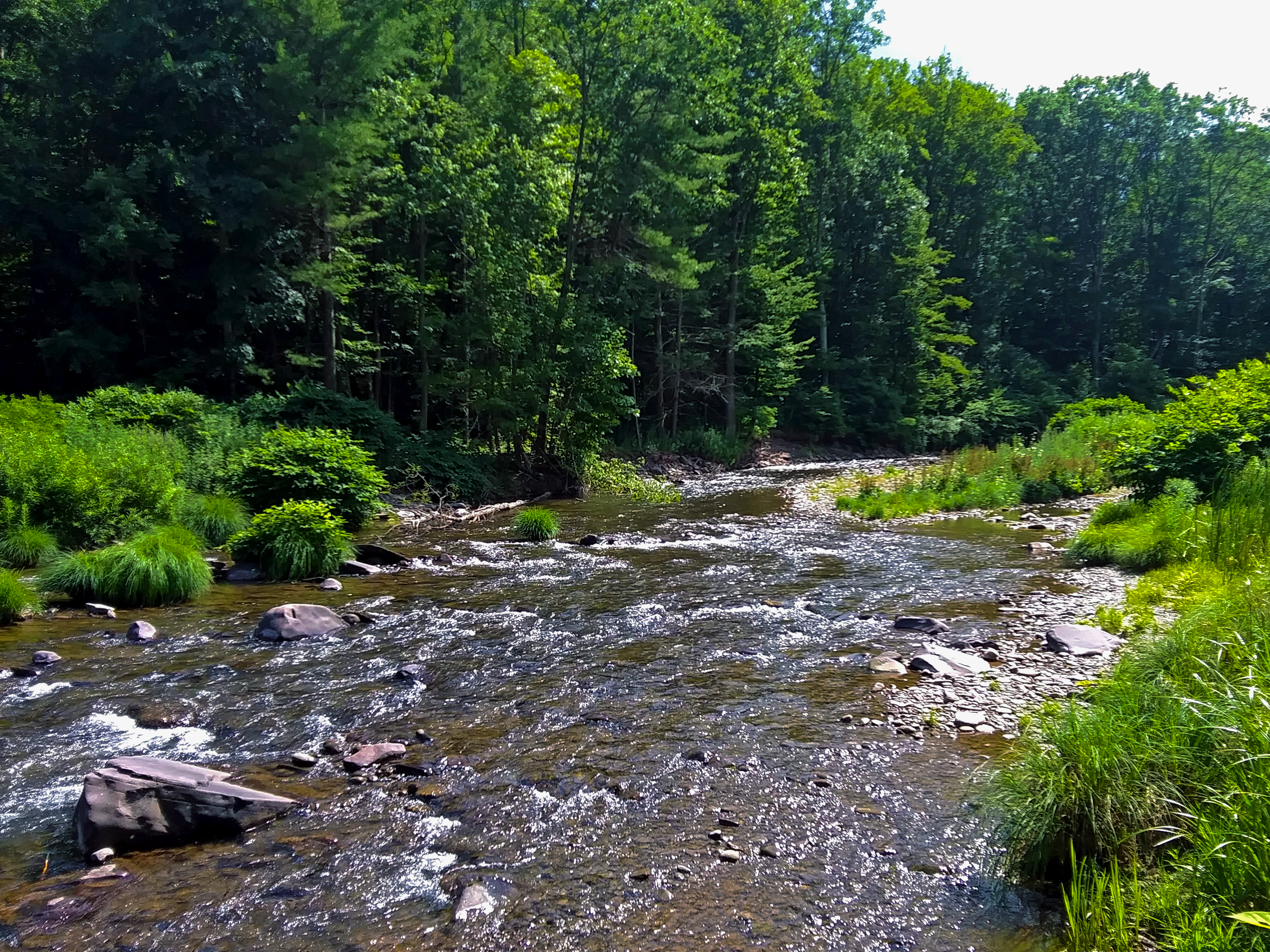
The Esopus above Shandaken

The Esopus receives Bushnellsville Creek from the north after a mile, then crosses to the south side of Route 28 at the small former hamlet of Shandaken 1.25 mi (2.01 km) to the east. Its next half-mile serves as part of the northern boundary of the Slide Mountain Wilderness Area. At Allaben, 5.5 miles (8.9 km) from Big Indian, it receives Fox Hollow Brook from the south, just east of the Fox Hollow Road bridge, and Peck Hollow Brook from the north 500 feet to the east, opposite another gravel bar. At this point the Esopus drops below 1,000 ft (300 m) in elevation.

The creek begins to bend southward, past Shandaken's town hall, over its next mile to where the 18-mile (29 km) Shandaken Tunnel brings water from Schoharie Reservoir into the Esopus from the north, increasing its flow. This point on the stream is known as the Shandaken Portal or just the Portal.

=== Big upper Esopus ===
South of the Portal, what is now the "big" portion of the upper Esopus turns southeast after Broadstreet Hollow Creek, with one smaller northern channel remaining closer to the road while the larger southern one bends closer to the base of Garfield Mountain, forming another one-mile portion of the Slide Mountain Wilderness boundary; the two converge at a public parking lot used to put in canoes and kayaks. Three miles (4.8 km) downstream, the creek turns to the south for another mile before turning east where Woodland Creek, the largest right tributary of the Esopus, flows in from the south following the east side of the former Panther crater wall, from its headwaters on Wittenberg Mountain, just east of where Woodland Valley Road crosses. Another 0.8 miles (1.3 km) in that direction, the Esopus reaches Phoenicia, the first major settlement along its course. Route 28 crosses again just west of where the stream receives Stony Clove Creek from the north, where it drains southern Greene County. The creek widens but remains shallow; the Catskill Mountain Railroad parallels its banks.

The stream bends into a southerly course between Mount Tremper to the east and Romer Mountain to the west. After two miles, more gravel bars and some islands in the channel mark a turn to the southeast. Another mile and a half (2.4 km) downstream, the Esopus receives the Beaver Kill at the hamlet of Mount Pleasant. It then crosses under Mount Pleasant Road and, 800 feet (240 m) downstream, Route 28, for the last time above the reservoir, near the hamlet of Mount Tremper. Here flood control measures stabilize the west bank.

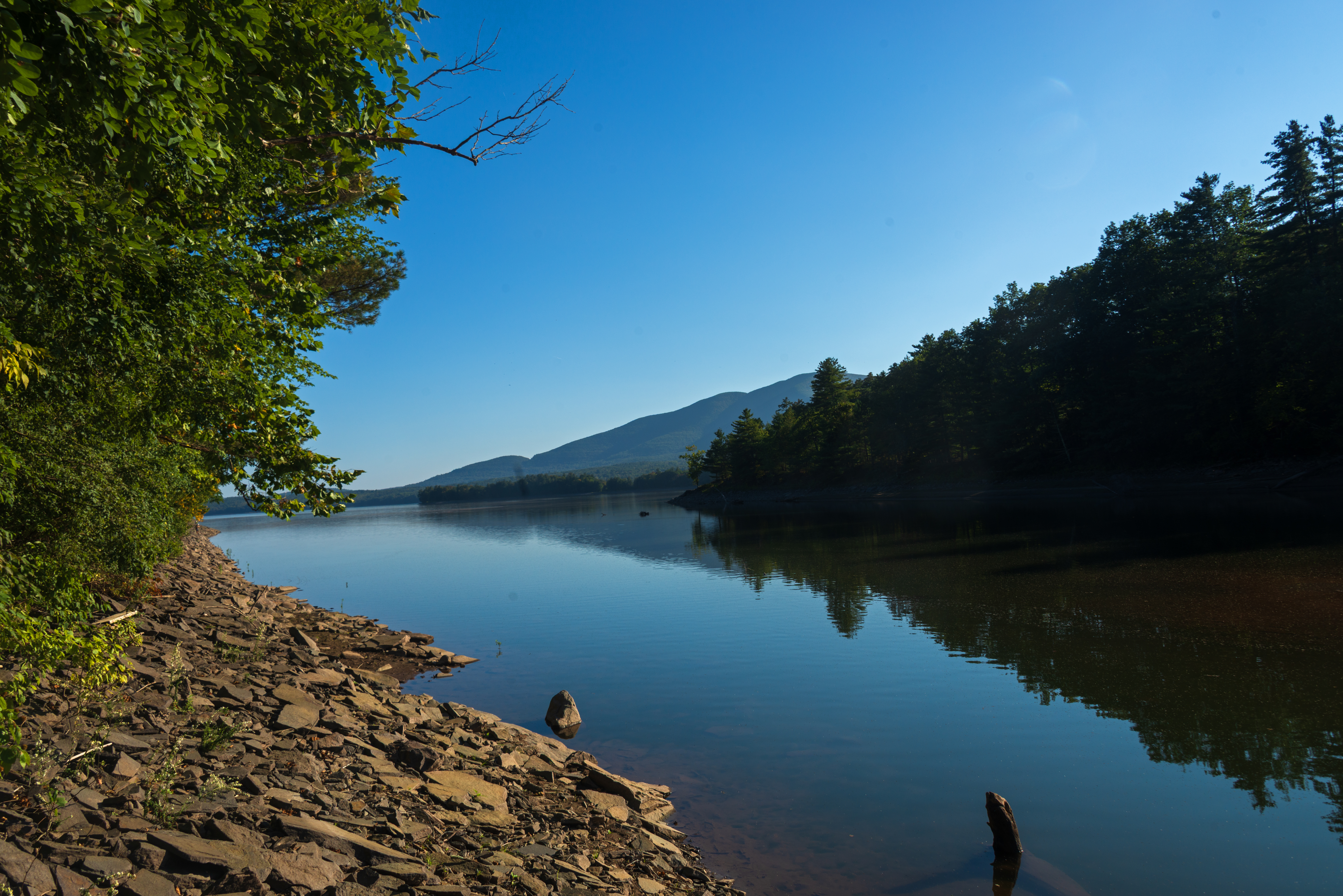
The mouth of the upper Esopus at Ashokan Reservoir

The Esopus trends to the south southeast over its next mile and a half to the mouth of the Little Beaver Kill at Beechford, where it leaves Shandaken and enters the town of Olive. The shores get more developed over the next 0.8 miles (1.3 km) as the stream turns south and reaches Boiceville, its largest settlement since Phoenicia, where NY 28A crosses it at Five Arches Bridge. After a large bend that takes it below 600 feet (180 m) in elevation, the Esopus enters Ashokan Reservoir, 12 miles (19 km) below Allaben, the end of the creek's 26-mile (42 km) upper section.

=== Lower Esopus ===
==== Ashokan Reservoir to Kingston ====
Four miles (6.4 km) from where it widens into the reservoir, just before Travers Hollow Brook and the Bush Kill drain into it, the main stem of the Esopus flows out of the reservoir's spillway. The reservoir continues for 6.5 miles (10.5 km) to its spillway near Olive Bridge. The reservoir's eastern section, slightly to the north, is not part of the creek's course.

The Esopus drops below 500 ft (150 m) in elevation as it leaves the reservoir. A thousand feet (300 m) downstream the reborn stream crosses under Route 28A again, amid a wide, forested canyon. It turns south, then east again, through Cathedral Gorge past the Ashokan Center on the north, through channelized and widened sections. Narrowing again, after another bend, the stream flows into the town of Marbletown another thousand feet east, also crossing the Blue Line and leaving the Catskill Park.

From there the creek bends to the west northwest, through a narrow gorge, with few structures breaking the forest around it. One mile into Marbletown it widens suddenly and bends to the south as a result of receiving the reservoir's other outlet stream. Gravel bars and some cleared areas on either side, still sloped steeply, mark the next mile of flow almost due south.

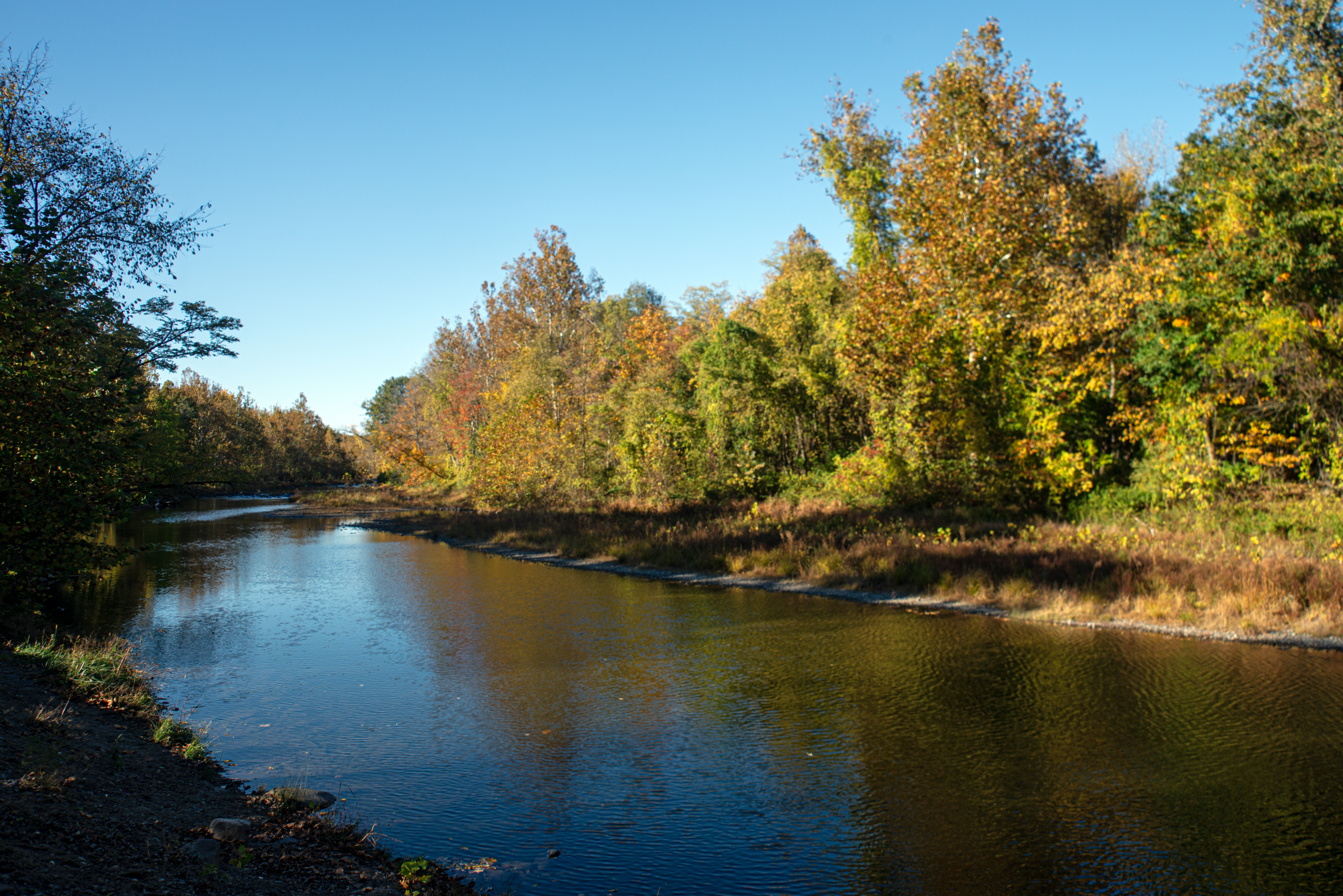
Esopus at Marbletown town park

Over the next 1.2 miles (1.9 km) the Esopus bends back and forth through similar terrain, paralleling New York State Route 213 for a thousand feet (305 m) below a steep bluff, to where its valley widens and cultivated fields become dominant in the surrounding landscape. Two miles (3.2 km) to the south, with the channel again widening to 150 ft (46 m), Hurley Mountain Road (Ulster County Route 5) crosses. Another 1,500 feet (460 m) south of that bridge, the stream bends again, reaching the southernmost point along its course (Note: 41.8737°N 74.1368°W) at a Marbletown park just above its confluence with an unnamed tributary flowing in from the south. From there the Esopus begins flowing northeast, as portions of the stream are diverted into nearby ponds for the farms that surround it and its riparian buffer on the increasingly level terrain.

After the old ford 1.25 miles (2.01 km) north of the park at Fording Place Road east of the hamlet of Lomontville, the Esopus starts paralleling U.S. Route 209, meandering slightly as it widens, with farmland on its west, sometimes widening from 60 ft (18 m) into 500-foot-wide (150 m) pools. Two miles north of Fording Place Road, another tributary, Stony Creek, flows in from the west at the Hurley town line. Another 1.75 miles (2.82 km) downstream, just past a wide braided bend, Wynkoop Road (Ulster County Route 29A) crosses the 120-foot (37 m) channel just east of the hamlet of Hurley and the Hurley Mountain Inn.

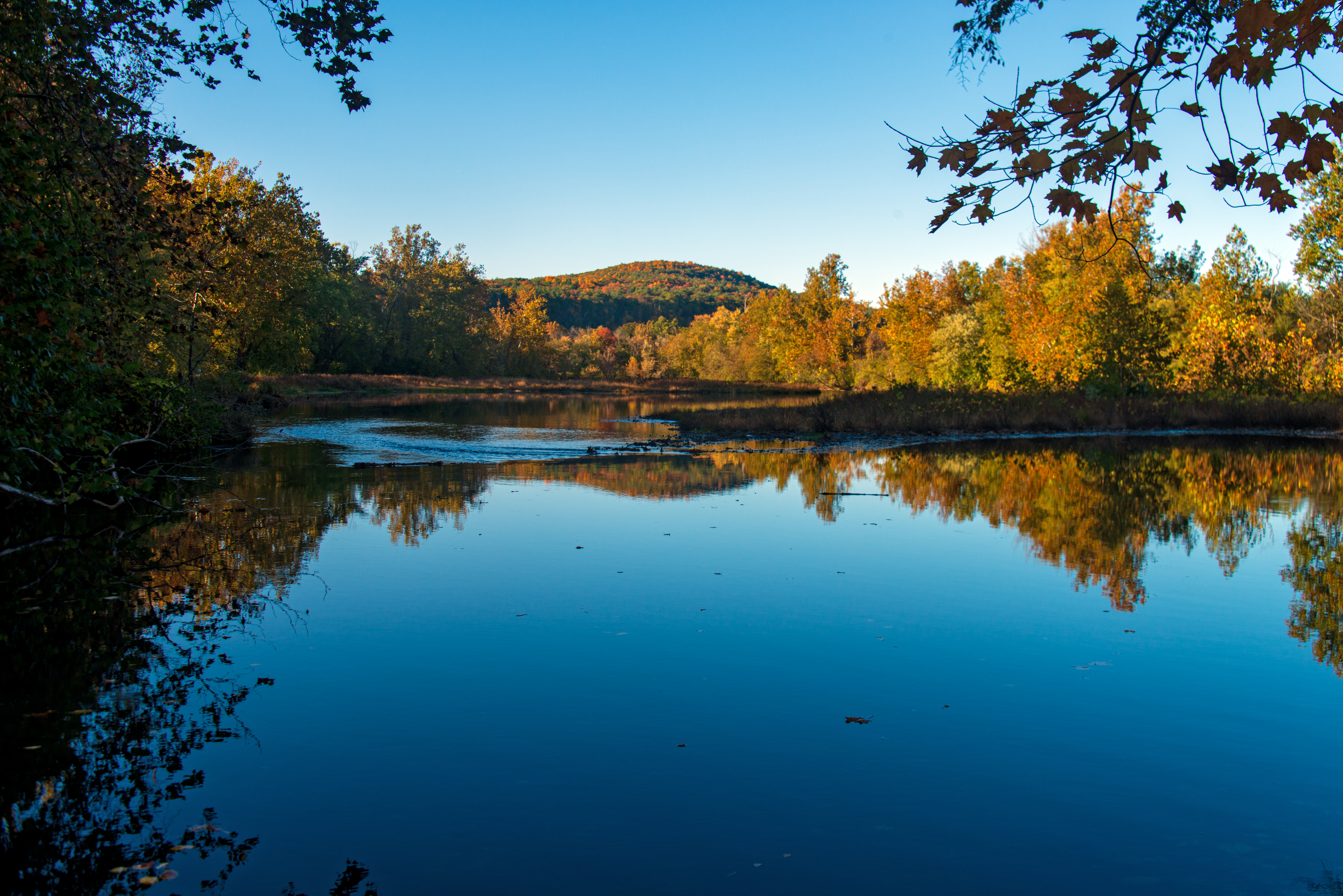
Wide meander in the Esopus near Hurley

North of that crossing, the Esopus bends away from Route 209 through fields, with some braiding and diversions, to the Ulster town line a mile downstream. Here its north bank becomes part of the Catskill Park Blue Line as well, bending east southeast and crossing under Route 209 a thousand feet downstream. It bends to the northeast again, and after another 2,000 feet (610 m) reaches the western corner of the city of Kingston, the largest settlement along the creek, (Note: Kingston's population, at the 2010 census, was reported to be nearly 24,000; more recent estimates have put it below 23,000. A 2018 estimate puts Phoenicia's population at 249 and the village of Saugerties at under 4,000.) after which it becomes the city's northern boundary.

==== Kingston to Saugerties ====
Another 1,500 feet (460 m) downstream, a bridge along the abandoned Ulster & Delaware right-of-way crosses the Esopus. The stream takes a long curve to the north and back southeastward over its next half-mile to where it crosses under the New York State Thruway just south of Exit 19, where the Catskill Park Blue Line leaves the stream to run along the west edge of the highway property. Another half-mile further downstream, Washington Avenue crosses; a state-owned public-access area with boat launch is located on the north bank along Sandy Road 500 feet downstream. After a half-mile with an apartment complex and strip mall on the south side and woodlands on the north of the 180-foot-wide (55 m) channel, Tannery Brook empties into the Esopus from a buried culvert just below where Route 28, now concurrent with Interstate 587, crosses the creek for the last time.

A half-mile past I-587, amid woodlands on both sides, the Esopus meanders parallel to the Thruway. Three-quarters of a mile downstream on a meandering course with a narrow channel, the Kingston city line leaves the stream on the east. The meandering creek draws near to the Thruway in a mile and begins to run parallel to it. Just past a turn to the northeast the Town of Ulster maintains another public access area near the ballparks on Buckley Street on the south side of the 145-foot (44 m) channel.

The Esopus crosses under Route 209 near Lake Katrine 1.1 mi (1.8 km) north of that point. A half-mile past that bridge, it receives another significant tributary, the Saw Kill. The riverside is more developed here, with homes and docks on the east bank. The channel narrows to 60 ft (18 m).

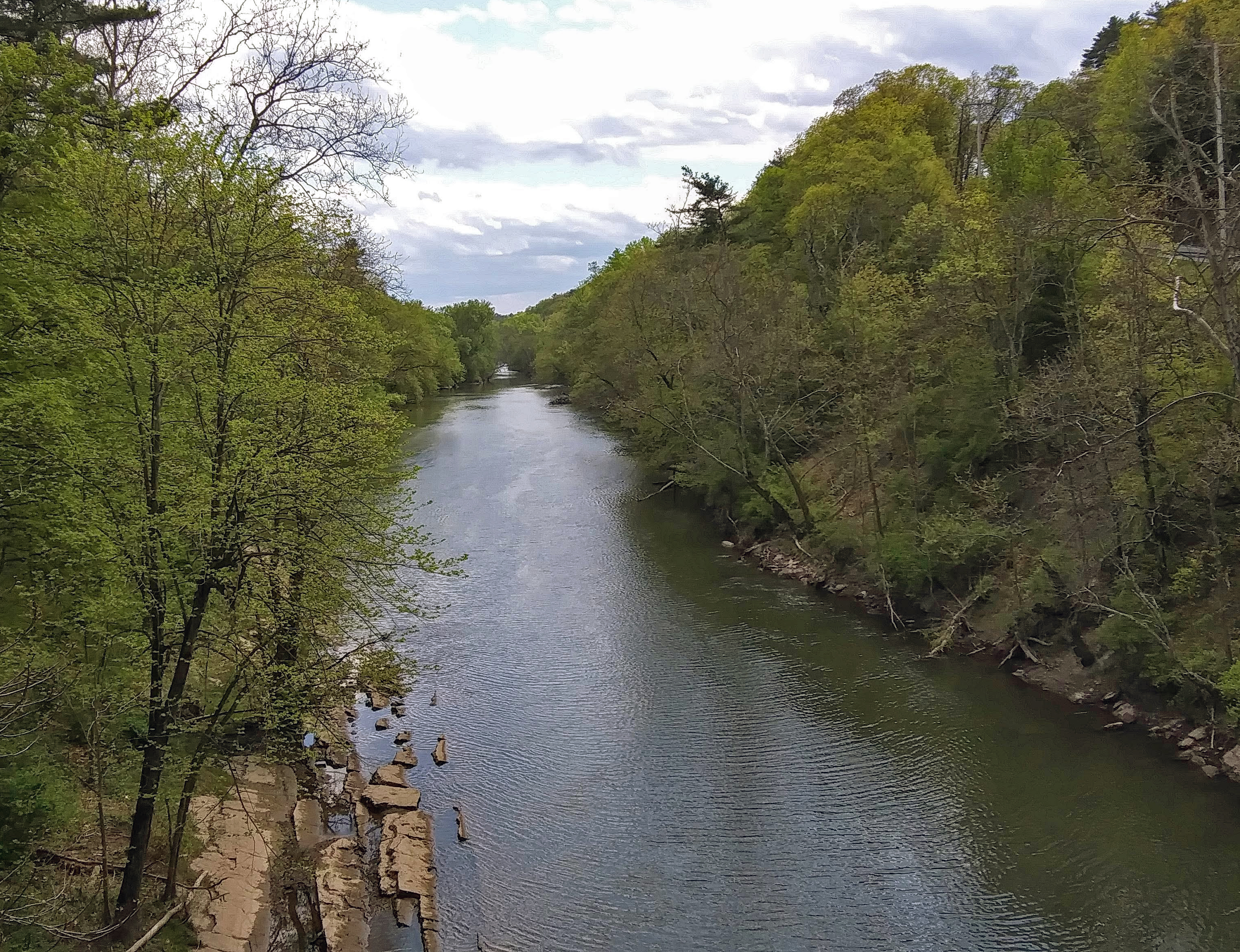
The Esopus from the Glasco Turnpike bridge in the town of Saugerties

A mile north of the Saw Kill, the Esopus bends northeast again and Leggs Mill Road (County Route 31) crosses as the stream descends slightly over a weir and some exposed bedrock. Backyards and docks line both banks over the next half-mile, where the channel widens again to 250 ft (76 m), after which the creek again turns north, the channel narrowing to 150–200 feet (46–61 m), and the CSX River Subdivision's freight tracks parallel the Esopus on its east. The stream flows north on a straight course, trending slightly east, for 1.75 miles (2.82 km) until it receives its last major tributary, Plattekill Creek, from the east at the Saugerties town line. At this point it bends eastward again and goes down Glenerie Falls, a series of five cascades that drop 68 feet (21 m) over the course of the next 2,000 ft (610 m) of stream,

Below Glenerie Falls, the Esopus, now below a hundred feet (30 m) in elevation, again turns north, paralleling U.S. Route 9W for a mile through a narrow, steep valley. After Glasco Turnpike (Ulster County Route 32) crosses the 100-foot channel, Route 9W veers off to the northeast, away from the stream, while the Esopus continues north through its narrow wooded gorge, for the next three miles (4.8 km), widening to 300 ft (91 m). Development around the stream is limited to a quarry on the east a mile downstream of the bridge, and then a dead-end residential street on the west bank during the last of the three miles; the 161-acre (65 ha) Esopus Bend Nature Preserve buffers the east bank.

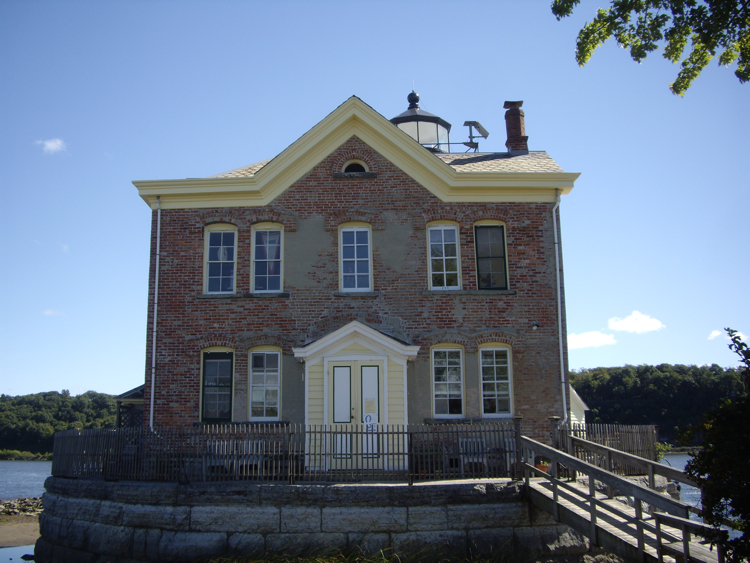
Saugerties Light

At the end of this reach, just southeast of the village of Saugerties, the Esopus receives its last tributary, Tannery Brook, from the north, turns east and enters the village. A half-mile of meandering past some marshy flats on the south side, a bridge carries Route 9W and New York State Route 32 over the stream, its last crossing. Below the bridge it flows over 25-foot (7.6 m) Cantine Dam, creating Cantine Falls. It bends north, then south, and returns to the east, as docks and structures abound on either side. After 1.3 miles (2.1 km) the Esopus empties into the Hudson, 88.5 miles (142.4 km) north of its mouth in New York City at Saugerties Light, a few feet (1–2 m) above sea level. (Note: The exact elevation varies with the tides and the recent level of precipitation. The National Oceanic and Atmospheric Administration's observation station at Turkey Point State Forest 2 miles (3.2 km) downriver on the west bank of the Hudson from the Esopus's mouth records the former's water level typically varying over a 4-foot (1.2 m) range between less than a foot to almost 4 feet above sea level since 2017.)

== Watershed ==
The Esopus' watershed covers 425 square miles (1,100 km^{2}). Most of it is in Ulster County, like the stream itself; the Greene County portion includes most of that county south of the Devil's Path range and its southeastern corner. A very small portion overlaps the Delaware County line west of Pine Hill. The upper Esopus basin, above the reservoir, is 256 square miles (660 km^{2}) with the lower basin accounting for the other 169 square miles (440 km^{2}).

To the south it is bordered by the combined watershed of the Rondout Creek and Wallkill River. On the northeast is the Kaaterskill Creek basin, with the West Kill draining the Spruceton Valley to the northwest into Schoharie Creek, a long tributary of the Mohawk River, itself the Hudson's longest tributary. (Note: Water from the West Kill and other watersheds of the upper Schoharie is diverted into the upper Esopus via the Shandaken Tunnel, making the Schoharie Reservoir's 312 sq mi (810 km^{2}) basin an accessory watershed of the Esopus.) On the western boundary, water drains into the East Branch of the Delaware River; the two upper branches of the Neversink, the Delaware's largest left tributary, rise along the Esopus basin's southwest boundary, with the Neversink's East Branch headwaters flowing a thousand feet from the Esopus' source at Winnisook Lake.

The upper Esopus watershed is rugged and 95 percent forested, with 58.5 percent part of the "forever wild" Forest Preserve and protected from almost all harvest or clearing. Three different types of forest predominate: montane spruce-fir boreal forest on the higher mountain summits, beech-birch-maple northern hardwood forest with some Eastern hemlock groves that survived the tanbarking area on the slopes, and an oak–hickory forest closer to the stream's banks. The summit of 3,090-foot (940 m) Ashokan High Point, overlooking the reservoir, offers an anomalous pine-oak heath barren.

Downstream of the reservoir the forests become a mix of the lower two. The floodplain forests are a mix of silver maple and elm; river birch clusters around the banks. Another unusual community, a pitch pine-scrub oak barren, is found on the summits of Hallihan and Jockey hills in the town of Kingston, just northwest of the Saw Kill confluence.

While there is some development clustered along Route 28 next to the stream, there is no significant agricultural use. Among the mountains within it or on its boundaries are 21 peaks over 3,000 ft (910 m) in elevation, including all or part of 16 of the 35 Catskill High Peaks exceeding 3,500 ft (1,100 m). Slide Mountain, the highest peak in the range, is also the highest peak in the Esopus watershed at about 4,180 ft (1,270 m). It has the highest average elevation of any of the watersheds that feed New York City's reservoirs. Tributaries, named and unnamed, add another 330 miles (530 km) of streams to the watershed.

From the reservoir to Marbletown, the lower Esopus is also surrounded by forest. Downstream of that point, its flood plain becomes heavily farmed, with 2,000 acres (810 ha) of worked agricultural land, mostly cornfields, abutting the stream between there and the Leggs Mills Road bridge at Lake Katrine. The mountains continue to influence the lower stream, with one High Peak, 3,573-foot (1,089 m) Indian Head Mountain, contributing to the Saw Kill and Plattekill Creek subwatersheds, much of which remain within the forests of the Catskill Park.

== History ==
The history of the Esopus, like the creek itself, has several distinct eras, starting with a meteor falling on the future Catskill Mountains.

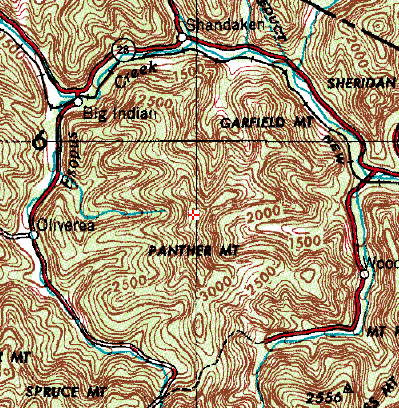
Circular pattern of Esopus headwaters and Woodland Creek, indicating past location of crater walls

=== Natural history ===
The Esopus's upper course was set 375 million years ago in the Devonian period, when the Catskills were still a river delta of low sedimentary beaches and the shallow channels between them to a large inland sea that corresponds to the location today of the Allegheny Plateau. A meteor impact during this time left an approximately 6 miles (9.7 km) wide crater whose walls correspond to the courses of the upper Esopus and Woodland Creek today. Geologist Yngvar Isachsen of the New York State Geological Survey discovered the traces of the meteor impact, including a higher fault density in the bedrock on the Esopus, in the late 20th century.

Later, the crater began to fill in with silt and became a crater lake. As the delta uplifted into a single plateau, the stream bed began to form along the heavily jointed and weaker shale and sandstone above the buried rim of the crater wall. As with the Catskills as a whole the newly forming streams began dissecting the plateau into mountains and valleys. This process led the Esopus, with its particularly deep and wide valley, to fill up its bed with the red clay that clouds the waters of the stream in high water and floods. More recently in geologic time, about 12,000 years ago, the Wisconsin glaciation filled the valley, carving the slopes on its sides more steeply and eroding more sediment into the river. It shaped the lower Esopus as well, as the long glacial ridges closer to the Hudson channeled the stream north to Saugerties after they melted.

As the glaciers melted slowly, they created ice dams and glacial lakes. The most significant of the latter along the Esopus's course left behind the large plain at Shokan. In the 20th century the original lake would be recreated as Ashokan Reservoir.

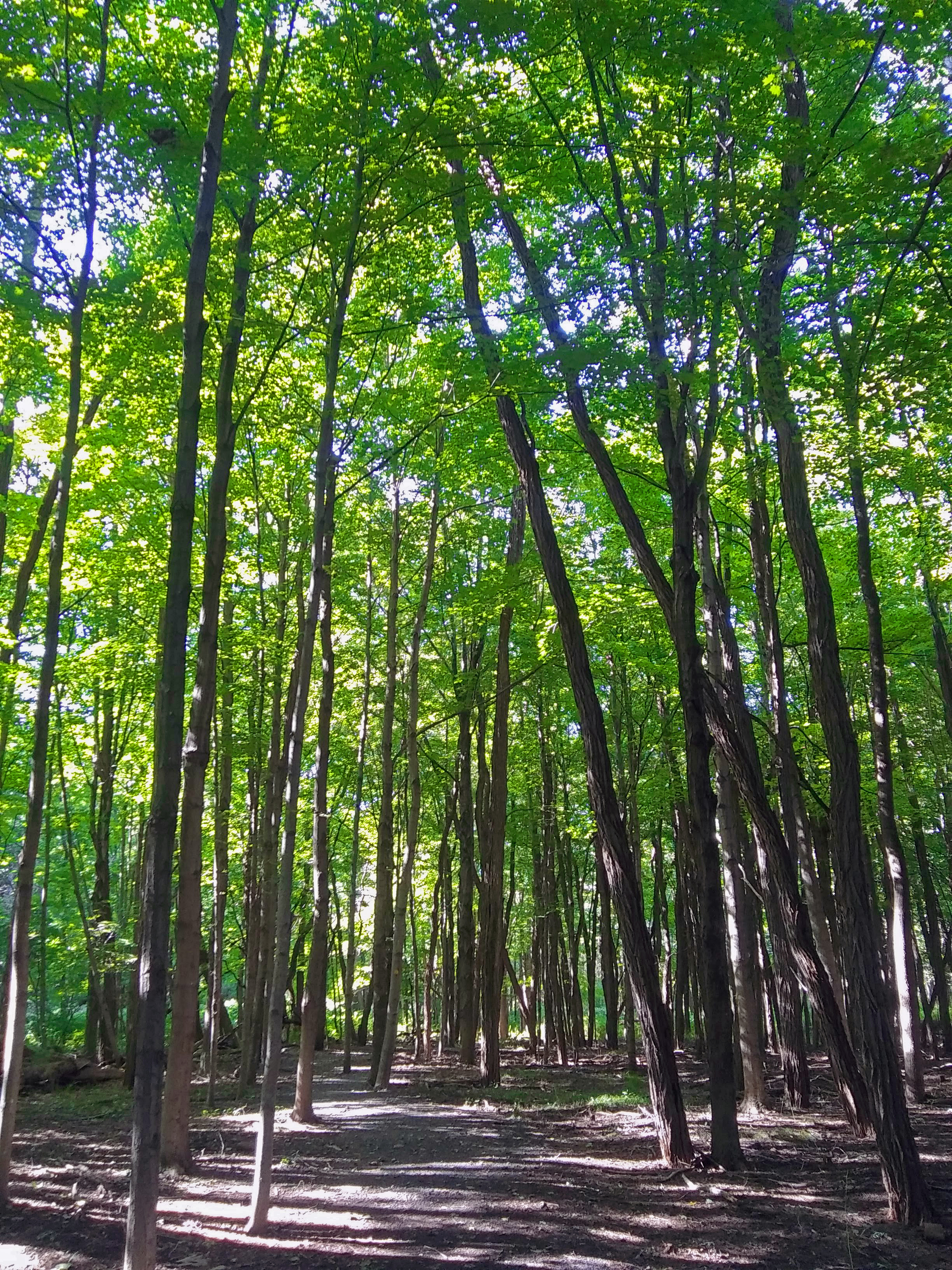
Oak-hickory Southern hardwood forest alongside Esopus at Beechford

The Esopus was one of three valleys that trees followed into the Catskills, as revegetation of the mountain slopes took place in the glaciers' wake. First to come were the boreal species, such as balsam fir, that today persist only on the summits of the range's higher peaks. Next were the northern hardwoods, primarily beech, birch and maple species, that dominate much of the Catskill forests today. Last were southern hardwood species, mostly oak, hickory and American chestnut, probably following the Indians as they migrated north. Most of the chestnuts died in the chestnut blight of the early 20th century. Catskill forest historian Michael Kudish found that other southern hardwood species can be found in the Esopus valley all the way to Oliverea, a mile or so below the creek's source.

=== Prehistory–1704: Native and European use ===
Human habitation or use of the stream's lower reaches has been recorded as far back as 4,000 years ago. As with many other streams in Ulster County, the Native Americans used the flat flood plains of the lower Esopus for cornfields, and there are accounts of the area around Olive, today inundated by the reservoir, planted as an apple orchard. The Natives did not settle the area permanently, and only ventured into the higher reaches of the valley to hunt as there was less arable land there.

The Esopus would be important to the area's early European colonization. It took its name from the Lenape band that inhabited its banks, some of whom entertained Henry Hudson on his voyage up the river in 1609 after possible earlier contact with fur traders. European traders began plying the river in greater numbers, eventually establishing permanent settlements for the purpose. Dutch settlers established Wiltwyck, today's Kingston, on the high ground between the Esopus and the Rondout in 1649. After the Esopus drove them out of the settlement in two wars, colonial governor Peter Stuyvesant ordered that it be enclosed in a stockade so it would be safer from raids by Indians and the other contending colonial power in the area, the English. The latter took over the New Netherland colony in 1664, taking a more nuanced approach to the native peoples of the area.

The settlement's location above the point where the Esopus came out of the Catskills made it an ideal trading post for Indians responding to the European demand for beaver pelts to make the beaver hats then in vogue. In the later 17th century, with European settlement well established around the eastern Catskills, land replaced fur as the Indian-held commodity most desired by the new arrivals. The English government in London charged local officials with granting large chunks of land on the colonial frontier so that it might be better protected from the French to the north and west, but those officials dallied, only making such grants when they could enrich themselves and their friends in the process. The Catskills and the Esopus Valley, with little land that could be cleared for farming, were not suitable to that end.

=== 1704–1885: Settlement and exploitation ===
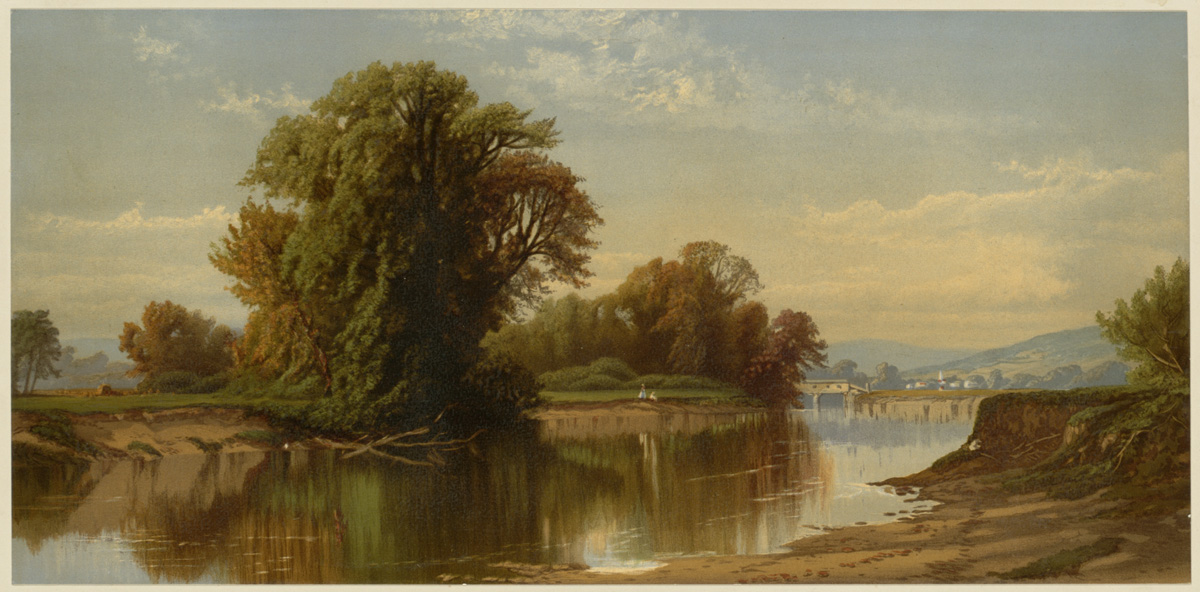
Early Autumn on Esopus Creek (circa 1861-1897), by Alfred Thompson Bricher

In 1704 a group of farmers in Hurley petitioned the colonial governor, Viscount Cornbury, for some of the undeveloped land to their west along the creek to use as common pasture and firewood, since they were getting squeezed by Kingston to their east and Marbletown to the south. The petition was put off for several years while it was ostensibly being surveyed, and in 1706 a grant of 2 million acres (8,000 km^{2}) was made to Johannes Hardenbergh and a group of investors starting from the same point along the Esopus near Kingston and going out to the Delaware River, taking not only all of Ulster County to the west but much of today's Delaware and Sullivan counties as well. The Hardenbugh Patent, as it became known, is the source of many of the land titles in the Catskills today, although its legitimacy was contested from the beginning, a dispute which continued until after the Revolution, aggravated by inadequate surveys of the region. Encumbrances remained on many properties into the 20th century.

The complications with the land claim delayed an accurate survey of the Catskills until 1885. In the meantime, permanent settlement of the Esopus valley began in the mid-18th century and finished with the establishment of the Slide Mountain post office in 1805. Most of these communities were supported by local forest-products industries: loggers harvested trees for sawmill operators, and furniture makers set up shop nearby. A road, the Ulster, Delaware and Dutchess Turnpike, was improved from an old colonial path that led up the valley and then into Delaware County past Highmount. By the middle of the century it was paralleled by the Ulster and Delaware Railroad.

Timber was not the only product taken from the mountainsides and sent down the valley. Tanners brought up cowhides via those routes to treat in water boiled in hemlock bark, and charcoal kilns were more numerous in the Esopus Valley than anywhere else in the Catskills. Bluestone for city sidewalks and buildings was also quarried out of the hills, and in some cases from the stream bed itself.

In 1877 naturalist Ernest Ingersoll visited the Esopus Valley and wrote about it for Harper's. He took note of the deforestation. "The Esopus, from source to outlet at Saugerties, is a brawling mountain stream, such as the painters go to Scotland to find", he wrote. "[O]r rather it was before the forests on its banks were felled and its waters befouled by refuse from the tanneries, mills, and villages, which, attracted by its bark and lumber, have grown up on its banks." Instead, he found the tributaries relatively untouched, places where he "would seek for the love of them the inmost recesses of the wilderness."

=== 1885–1915: Recreational development ===
The possibility that silt from eroded Adirondack slopes could clog the Erie Canal had led the state's business community to lobby for the creation of the Forest Preserve in 1885. A legislative maneuver by the Ulster County delegation later that year added the Catskills, relieving the county of property tax obligations to the state on lands it had taken by foreclosure after the tanners and loggers had harvested everything of value and absconded with the revenue. The lands transferred to the state by the legislation were required to be kept forever wild. The legislation became Article 14 of the state constitution nine years later, in 1894, with added provisos that prohibited their sale, lease or any other transfer without a new amendment authorizing such a transaction.

By that era most of the easily accessible woodlands had been harvested. In combination with technological advances in some fields that eliminated the need for the raw materials of the forest, most of the industries that had made such an impact on the region in the early 19th century declined. In their place a new one arose, mountain tourism, giving the newly affluent of the Gilded Age a place to connect with nature and get away from hot cities in the summer months. Bishop's Falls House, run by that family on the Esopus near that feature, was a popular destination, expanded to accommodate 135 guests in 1905, earning the proprietors $3,000 ($107,000 in today's dollars) that summer

One destination resort was the Tremper Mountain House, outside Phoenicia on the slopes of Mount Tremper. During its peak period in the 1880s, it had a small trout pond out front. The house doctor, H.R. Winter, was an avid practitioner and promoter of the new sport of fly fishing, which he believed had therapeutic effects, making "a person for a time forget he ever had any care, business, or anxiety."

Anglers of the era who ventured into the Esopus valley were advised by guidebooks and magazine articles touting the Catskills' trout populations to bypass the main stream in favor of the tributaries, since the Esopus itself was generally too warm for brook trout, the favored species at that time, and still too polluted by runoff from the tanneries. In the 1880s pioneering fish farmer Seth Green advocated the stocking of rainbow trout in streams where the brook trout population was beginning to thin as a result of the fishing pressure, as they could handle warmer water better. Other anglers feared that, if introduced, the more aggressive rainbows would displace the native brooks.

In 1883 and 1884, thousands of rainbow fry and mature fish were stocked in the Esopus between Phoenicia and Big Indian. They soon became the stream's dominant fish, and the Esopus became an angling destination in its own right. Specimens of 3–4 pounds (1.2–1.6 kg) were reported, and some were displayed in tanks at the Big Indian Railroad Station.

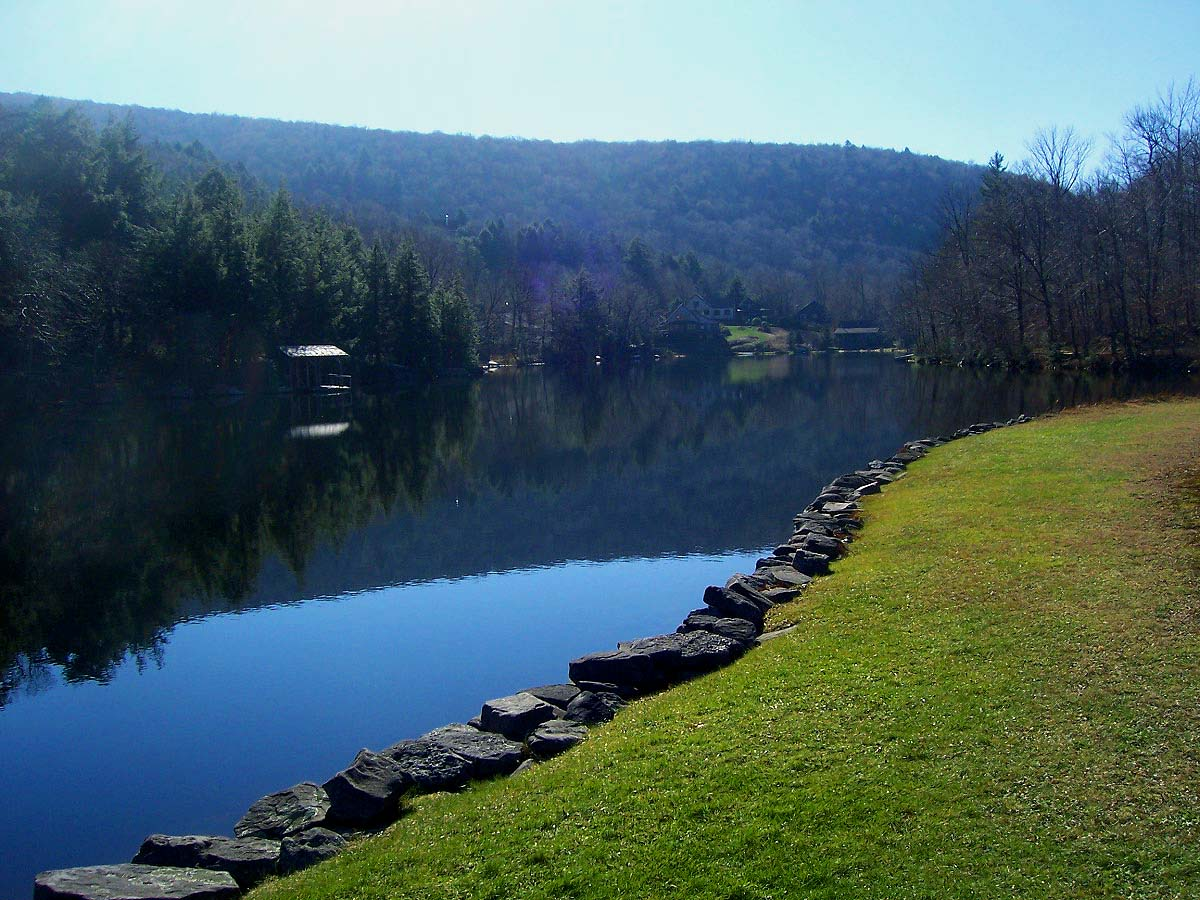
Winnisook Lake

Unlike the Beaver Kill and Willowemoc Creek to the south, the development of Esopus Creek as a fishing stream did not result in the establishment of private fishing clubs, with one exception. In 1887 Alton Parker and his friends bought the 600 acres (240 ha) on the slopes of Slide Mountain where the stream's source was located. They dammed the stream and created the 6.4-acre (2.6 ha) Winnisook Lake, the highest lake in the Catskills, for their exclusive enjoyment. In 1896 the members received William Jennings Bryan, then the Democratic nominee for President, as a guest. His visit attracted much attention locally, with residents lining the Ulster and Delaware's rails to see him and huge crowds waiting to shake his hand at stations

=== 1915–1973: Watershed development ===
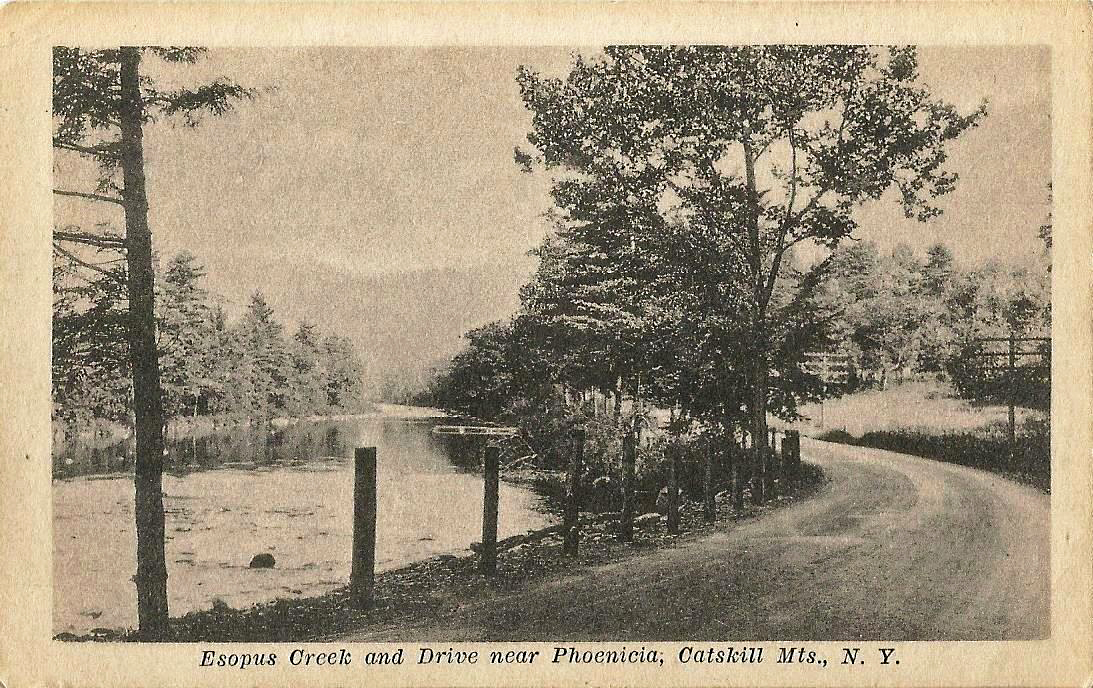
1927 postcard

In 1861 the city of Kingston had considered buying the land around Bishop's Falls near Ashokan to dam and use as a reservoir. It dropped the idea quickly since the creek's waters were still fouled by tanning effluents. A quarter-century later it took a second look, and found the waters had returned to their pristine state with the tanneries gone. It eventually developed Cooper Lake on a tributary of the Saw Kill, for its water needs instead, after the privately owned Ramapo Water Company bought the rights.

Twenty years after that, in the early years of the 20th century, New York City's reservoirs in Westchester and Putnam counties were barely keeping up with the growing city's demand. The city's agents looked at land along the Ramapo River on the other side of the Hudson, in Rockland and Orange counties, for new reservoir sites, but found the Ramapo Water Company had gotten there first, and was locking up similar rights in Delaware and Sullivan counties as well. The city balked at rewarding this act of speculative profiteering, and in 1900 engineer John Ripley Freeman, who had worked on the development of Boston's water supply, produced a report for the city on possible future water sources that disparaged the upper Esopus, estimating that without any precipitation or streamflow data to work from, it could provide no more than 100 million gallons (380,000 m^{3}) a day, half of what Ramapo had claimed and equivalent to some of the areas on the Ten Mile River, a tributary of the Housatonic that the city was also considering. The soil was less conducive to dam and reservoir construction, precluding the possibility of building larger storage facilities.

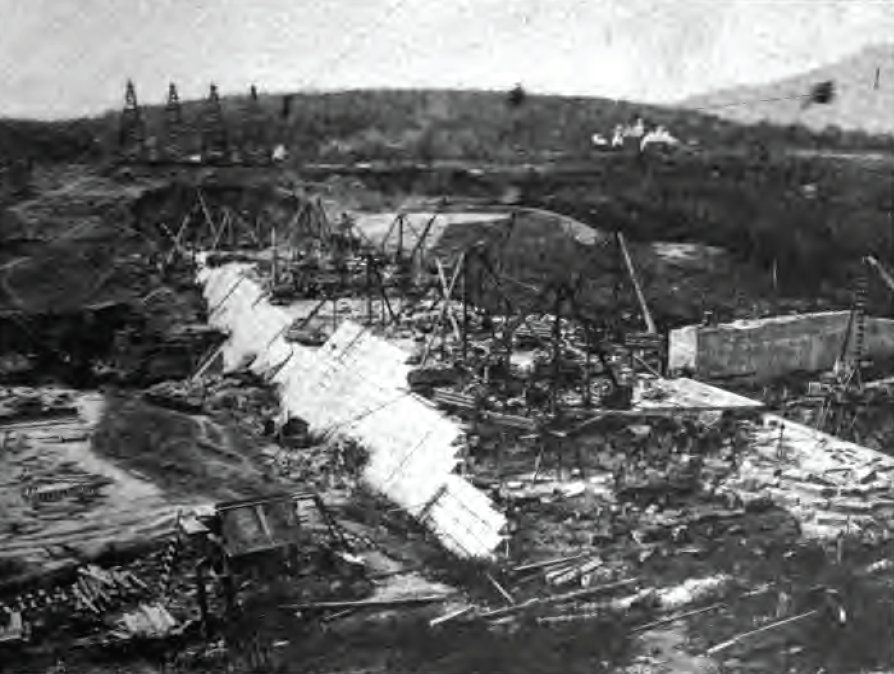
Construction of Olivebridge Dam ca. 1910

After political wrangling the state revoked the company's rights in 1901, whereupon the city's early skepticism about the Esopus, as expressed in Freeman's report, evaporated. The creek's soft water was now held to be its chief virtue, as it would among other things save the city's residents almost a half million dollars a year on soap, by a 1903 report Freeman contributed to. Two years later the state allowed the city to create its own water supply commission and granted it the exclusive right to acquire land in the Esopus and Schoharie watersheds and construct two reservoirs. (Note: The rainfall data Freeman was unable to find in 1900 made the choice of the Esopus fortuitous, since the weather station at the Winnisook Club on Slide Mountain, the north slopes of which are in the creek's watershed, gets 63 inches (1,600 mm) of precipitation annually, the highest average annual rainfall in the state.)

Residents in the Esopus valley attempted to block the project, objecting to the dislocation the proposed reservoir would require, forcing out the population of seven hamlets and relocating the Ulster and Delaware. They also noted that both reservoirs would be outmoded in a decade, requiring the construction of more reservoirs, and suggested the city look further north, to the Adirondacks. They feared the dam would fail, and called the project the "Esopus folly".

The state's water supply commission ruled in the city's favor, and once the city began acquiring land most local objections faded because local lawyers, well versed in the tangled history of land claims on the former Hardenburgh Patent, were able to negotiate prices highly favorable to local landowners. The reservoir was completed in 1913 and began delivering its first water to the city via the Catskill Aqueduct two years later.

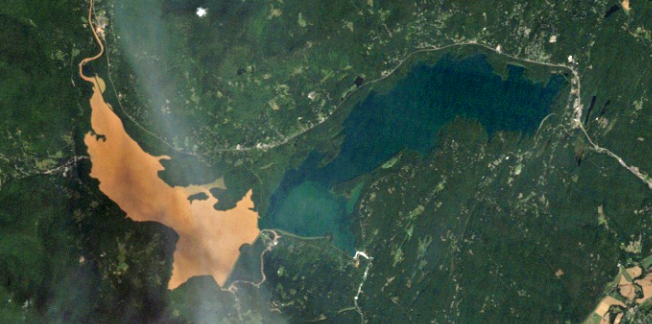
Landsat 5 image two days after Hurricane Irene showing how the reservoir's two basins contain turbidity

City engineers had taken note of the tendency of the clays and silts on the beds and banks of the Esopus to cloud the water for long periods of time after heavy rain. To deal with this, they designed the reservoir with two basins. Water from the upper Esopus accumulates in the western basin, where accumulated sediment is allowed to settle. The clearer water near the surface is then allowed to flow into the eastern basin, where the aqueduct begins.

The water releases from the Portal made the sections below it into a whitewater stream with rapids of Class II-III on the International Scale of River Difficulty. In the mid-1960s the Kayak and Canoe Club of New York began holding an annual whitewater slalom near Phoenicia. Later businesses in the hamlet began offering tubing to summer visitors; it has become one of the most popular recreational activities on the creek despite its negative impact on angling and occasional fatalities.

=== 1974–2010: Stream management, flooding problems and city-local conflicts ===
In the late 20th century, the population of the upper Esopus valley more than doubled. Most of the increase came from residential land use, which has also more than doubled as agricultural use has decreased 80 percent. The newer residents have primarily used the area for second homes.

Clashes between homeowners, recreational users and the city have been resolved with regional stream management efforts that involve all stakeholders, such as local and state government, user groups, and local advocacy groups. These began on the upper Esopus in the 1970s between anglers and the city over releases from the Portal. In the 21st century they began to involve homeowners and their communities along the lower Esopus, asking the city to consider the effect on them in how it manages the reservoir even though they are outside its watershed.

This era of the creek's history began in the 1970s. At the time the city considered solely its own water needs in setting the Portal discharges. Regular anglers knew the stream could change greatly, from a torrent one day to a trickle the next, depending on how the city saw its needs. During the 1974 fishing season, two trout kills along the Esopus that the New York State Department of Environmental Conservation (DEC) attributed to the Portal discharges led to anger at the city and threats of lawsuits. Angler organizations and other local advocacy groups formed Catskill Waters, an umbrella organization, to fight the city on the issue. In 1976 they were able to lobby the state legislature to pass, over vigorous opposition from the city, a new section of the state's Environmental Conservation Law permitting DEC to regulate discharges from the Schoharie and some other reservoirs. (Note: The regulations require that the city notify DEC's regional office in New Paltz whenever it needs to change the flow through the tunnel. From June to October it must limit releases into the Esopus so that the Shandaken stream gauge records no more than 465 cubic feet (13.2 m^{3}) per second, but also release enough water every day to keep streamflow there at at least 248 cubic feet (7.0 m^{3}) per second. If streamflow exceeds that upper limit, it must suspend releases. It must also change the rate of flow through the tunnel at no more than a rate of 62 cubic feet (1.8 m^{3}) per second each hour. DEC allows the flow maximum to be exceeded for whitewater recreational events as long as those requests are arranged in advance through a consortium of recreational groups including American Whitewater, the Appalachian Mountain Club and the American Canoe Association.)

Catskill Waters and the other organizations, later under the auspices of the Catskill Center for Conservation and Development, next worked to prevent the Power Authority of the State of New York (PASNY) from building a pumped-storage station to feed a nearby artificial lake and hydroelectric plant on Schoharie Reservoir, arguing that it would warm the Esopus too much. The authority responded that it would actually be beneficial for trout, by reducing sediment and moderating the colder temperatures that inhibit the fish from breeding in the early spring. In 1987 PASNY withdrew its application to the Federal Energy Regulatory Commission to build the project.

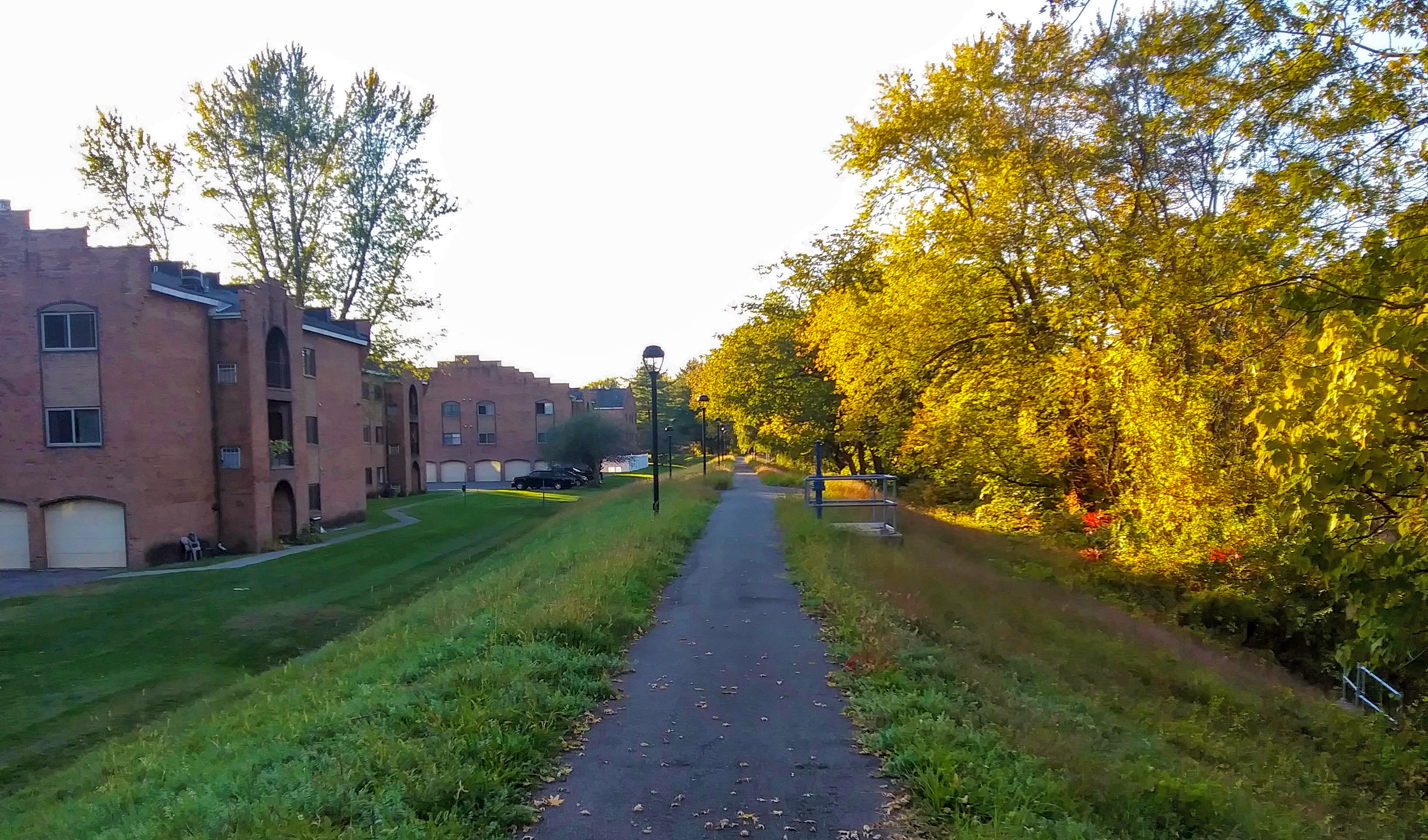
Levee along Esopus in Kingston

Flood control measures were built along almost half a mile (Note: 2,540 ft (770 m)) of the east bank of the Esopus at the northwest corner of Kingston in the late 1970s, in response to the March 1951 flood that reached an estimated discharge of 34,000 cu ft (960 m^{3}) per second, considered to be the heaviest flooding ever in that reach. The combination of 8-foot (2.4 m) levees and concrete flood walls, along with interior measures like catch basins and a pumping station, was designed to contain flooding up to 37,600 cu ft (1,060 m^{3}) per second, about 10 percent greater than the 1951 flood. They protect an apartment complex and strip mall immediately adjacent to the creek between what is today Washington Avenue and I-587/NY 28. (Note: There are also less formal earthen levees on the stream's north bank near the bend at the end of Farm to Market Road north of Kingston, built to protect a mobile home park located there until the early 21st century. They were poorly constructed and do not appear to have been maintained since the park ceased operations.)

In March 1980 the upper Esopus flooded significantly for the first time in years following a heavy storm. Roads were left impassable, including a section of Route 28 at Boiceville, some bridges were damaged or washed away, and many tributaries suffered severe damage. The gauge at Coldbrook recorded a maximum discharge of 65,300 cubic feet per second (1,850 m^{3}/s), breaking a 30-year-old record.

To avoid a federal requirement that it build a water filtration plant that would cost several billion dollars, (Note: Water from the Croton River watershed, just north of the city in Westchester and Putnam counties, is filtered due to the heavy development of that area, but it accounts for only 10 percent of the city's water supply.) in 1990 the city instituted stricter rules for the use of its lands in its watersheds, (Note: New York is one of a few cities granted this waiver. Most of the other ones, like Portland, San Francisco and Seattle, are able to avoid filtration because their watersheds are mostly or wholly on minimally developed federally protected lands.) regulations that adversely affected the local economies. This exacerbated tensions between the city and local residents, many of whom had long resented what they considered to be the city's arrogance and lack of concern for them. After seven years of litigation and activism, the Catskill Watershed Corporation was created in 1997 to mutually manage the watershed in the city and the local communities' best interest. It invests and facilitates economic development in the city's Catskill and Delaware watersheds that enhances water quality.

The Portal became an issue between anglers and the city again in the late 1990s. After a heavy January 1996 blizzard was followed by a thaw and equally heavy rain, washing the melting snow into waterbodies along with the runoff, and in the process doing severe damage to streambanks in the Schoharie Reservoir's watershed. The eroded silt and clay washed into the depth of reservoir, where it was then drawn into the tunnel and released into the Esopus. The Coldbrook gauge recorded maximum discharge of 53,600 cubic feet per second (1,520 m^{3}/s), its highest since the 1980 flood. For several years afterward the creek was often so muddy that fly-fishermen went elsewhere to pursue trout, adversely affecting the local economy.

In 2000 the angler advocacy group Trout Unlimited filed a lawsuit in federal court under the Clean Water Act arguing that the city needed a permit if it was going to continue releasing muddy water from the Schoharie basin into the Esopus. The trial court's dismissal was overturned on appeal by the Second Circuit Court of Appeals in October 2001. In 2003, on remand, another federal judge assessed a $5.7 million fine against the city for muddying the creek and ordered it to get a state permit. The city duly applied for and received a New York State Pollutant Discharge Elimination System (SPDES) permit effective in 2006.

Another heavy rain struck the region at the beginning of April 2005, delivering 2–6 inches (51–152 mm) over 36 hours; the Coldbrook gauge recorded a maximum discharge of 55,200 cubic feet (1,560 m^{3}) per second, the third worst flood in the stream's recorded history at that time after floods in 1980 and 1951. The Allaben gauge recorded its all-time heaviest flow of 21,700 cubic feet per second (610 m^{3}/s), whose recurrence interval was estimated to be 30 years, and the upper Esopus experienced similar effects as it had in 1980, severely impacting the stream's brown trout population that year, since the species spawns in the spring. Unlike 1980, this flood also affected the lower Esopus. The Mount Marion gauge recorded what is still its maximum ever amount at 30,500 cubic feet per second (860 m^{3}/s), an 80-year flood and far greater a flow than that seen in any flood event there for almost a century.

Roads had to be closed in the vicinity of the creek, including Kingston Circle, the junction of Route 28, Washington Avenue, Interstate 587 and the offramps from the New York State Thruway. Businesses near the stream had to close, including several hotels, and the Red Cross estimated that 109 houses along the creek were destroyed; some areas reached 100-year flood levels. Five years later, the last quarter of 2010 brought two separate storms that both reached around 40,000 cubic feet per second (1,100 m^{3}/s) at Coldbrook, meaning that five of the 11 worst storms in that gauge's history had come in the preceding 30 years.

In the wake of the first storm, in October, the city began releasing turbid water into the lower Esopus from the reservoir for the first time. In the hundred days following the storm and its successor, 40 billion US gallons (150 million cubic metres) of dark brown muddy water was channeled down the creek in order to clear the reservoir itself. DEC filed a complaint against the city seeking $2.6 million in damages and a committee of state, local and city representatives was convened to decide on a schedule for future releases.

=== 2011–present: Hurricane Irene and after ===
The sixth, and worst, storm came within a year, when Hurricane Irene struck the Catskills at the end of August 2011. At the peak of the flooding, discharge at Coldbrook was 75,800 cubic feet per second (2,150 m^{3}/s), its all-time high. More than 6 inches (150 mm) of rain fell all over Ulster County, and the Slide Mountain weather station at Winnisook Lake recorded nearly a foot (305 mm), a 200-year storm.

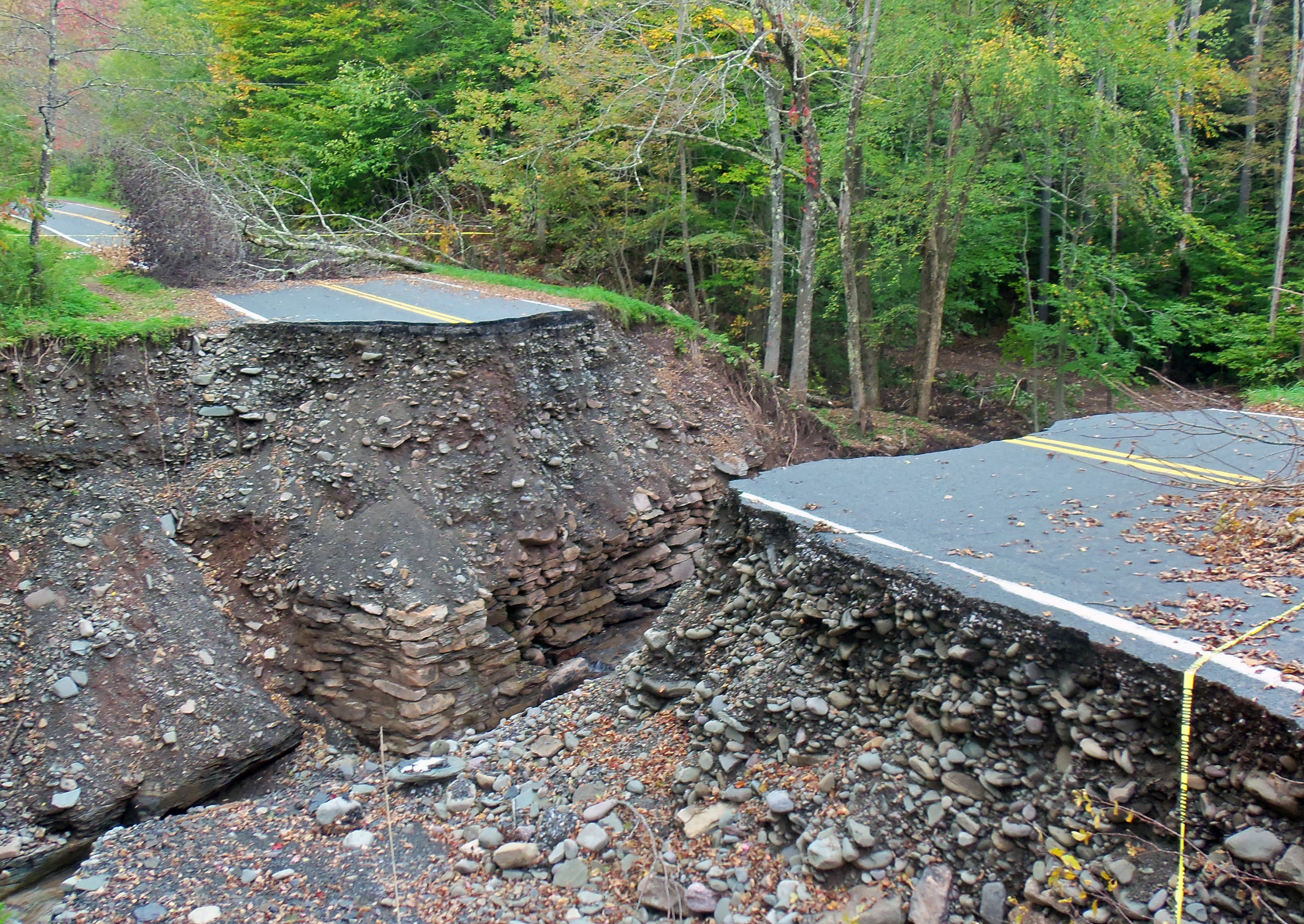
Site of bridge over Giant Ledge Stream on County Route 47 a month after Irene

The deluge at Winnisook Lake led to concerns after the rains stopped that the dam would burst, which could have devastated much of Shandaken even further; the problem was made more urgent since Giant Ledge Stream had washed out the bridge along County Route 47, cutting the lake and headwaters of the Esopus off from the rest of the town. Many homes and businesses downstream had suffered serious damage from the floods; in Phoenicia the popular Sweet Sue's restaurant was flooded to a depth of a foot, with five inches (13 cm) of silt. The Bridge Street crossing into the hamlet from the east had to be closed and rebuilt. Further downstream on the upper Esopus, a lightly used bridge at Coldbrook was swept away, along with most of the old railroad trestle near the mouth of the reservoir. Two weeks later, the remnants of Tropical Storm Lee brought another 7.5 inches (19 cm) of rain and more flooding to areas still recovering from Irene.

While stream discharge on the Esopus below the reservoir remained below the levels experienced in 2005, floods along that reach did more damage. Farmers whose fields are along the creek's flood plain in Marbletown and Hurley reported that some of their fields were under as much as 10 feet (3.0 m) of water, killing livestock, washing away buildings and ruining crops just as the harvest season began. "I don't think I have ever seen anything on this scale here in New York", remarked Darrel Aubertine, the state's Commissioner of Agriculture and Markets.

Downstream of that reach, the Esopus did not cause the damage it had in 2005, which has been attributed to the reservoir holding the waters back; only near the Saw Kill and Plattekill Creek confluences was flooding severe. The stream remained extremely muddy for several months afterwards as the city again released water from the reservoir, muddy enough for its bright orange color to be visible in satellite photos used by Google Maps. Ulster County and Riverkeeper, whose complaints about similarly turbid releases earlier that year had led DEC to fine the city $2.6 million, again petitioned for the city to be required to either use the reservoir's release channel or add alum to the water, which it had stopped doing in 2007 due to negative environmental effects. The DEP commissioner said that the county had a choice between "mud or flood", a dichotomy local officials saw as false.

The city's local opposition threatened litigation. Ulster County Executive Michael P. Hein, the first elected to the position when it was created in 2008, was particularly vocal, likening the city to a colonial power in the region. "They have their own police force, their own rules and regulations. They're extracting a natural resource at below-market rates and they use their powers indiscriminately,"

An early version of the city's federal Filtration Avoidance Determination (FAD) in 2013 showed that $2 million had been allocated to deal with the muddying of the lower Esopus, but it was taken out before the final version was approved. The city promised a consent order later that year would separately address the issue; since the FAD only applies to water meant for drinking. It has, but Ulster County would still prefer it be included in the FAD.

In 2017 the city released its draft FAD renewal applications. Some comments on it suggested that major discharges from the reservoir should be prohibited; the city replied that the consent order addressed this issue, which was beyond the scope of the FAD. It also responded to a suggestion that it keep the reservoir below capacity to prevent flooding of the lower Esopus by saying that its water supply needs require the reservoir be at or close to full around June 1 each year.

At the end of that year the state Department of Health granted the FAD through 2027. As a condition of that renewal the city had to build a new wastewater treatment plant for the hamlet of Shokan, in the town of Olive just north of the reservoir. It was also required to continue existing programs that provided for streamside land conservation, best-management practices on agricultural lands, and septic tank installations and replacements at local businesses.

== Recreation ==
=== Angling ===
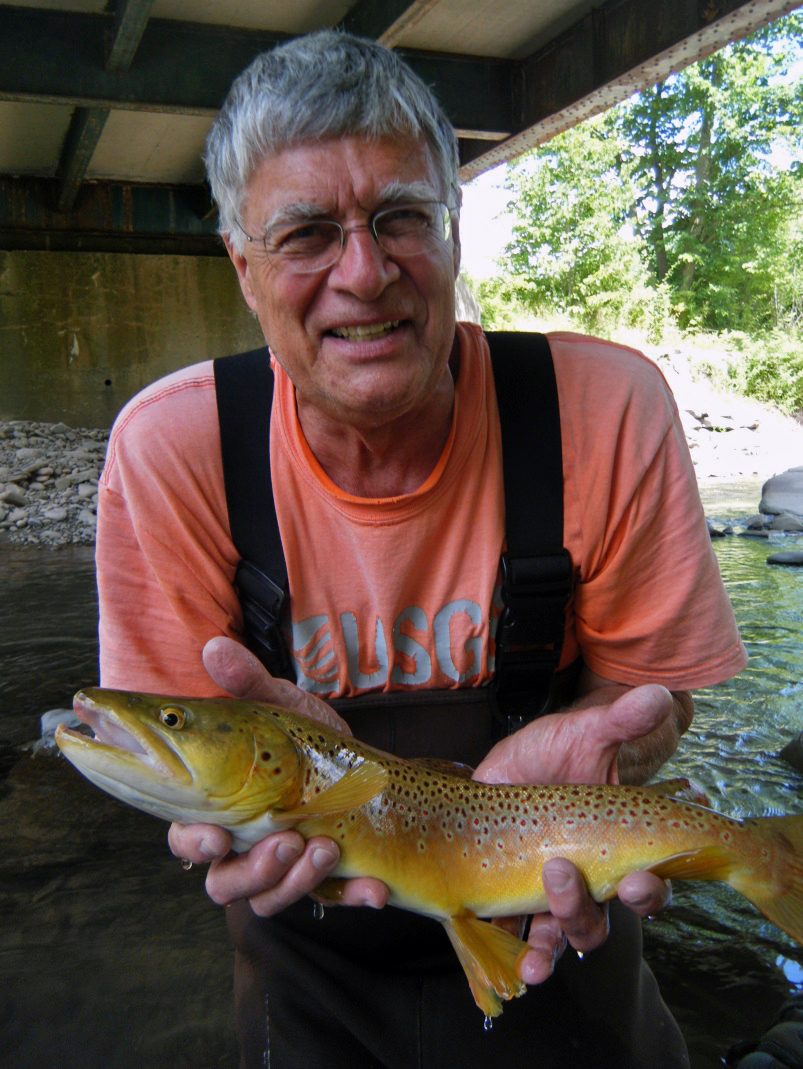
Large brown trout taken from the Esopus during a study

Trout from local streams had been a dietary staple since the earliest days of settlement in the Catskills. The farmers used every means they could, including bait, nets, and even sledgehammers, to catch enough to make sure their families had plenty to eat whatever the outcome of their harvests. By the 1840s the Esopus's trout fishery was beginning to attract anglers from outside the region. Many stayed at Milo Barber's Inn in Shandaken.

Theodore Gordon, considered the father of American dry-fly fishing, did most of his angling in the Beaver Kill, Willowemoc Creek, the Neversink River and other streams of Sullivan County, south of the Esopus watershed. But in 1913, he wrote the construction of the reservoir would give the Esopus "the finest trout fishing in America, if properly treated ... It will be stocked naturally from the Esopus with the rainbow and European trout of the finest quality."

Today the upper Esopus still attracts many anglers who fly-fish for trout, particularly because the state land around it in the Slide Mountain and Big Indian-Beaverkill wilderness areas makes it more accessible than other streams in the region, with a number of public parking areas and stretches where DEC has negotiated public fishing rights on private property. In the late 19th century it became the first place in the Catskills where rainbow trout were successfully stocked, and the population of that fish has since become indigenous to the point that it is considered one of the most productive wild-trout streams in the Northeast. The state augments it with regular stockings of brown trout as well. Because of that species' preference for later spawning dates in the fall, trout season along the Esopus extends until November 30, a month and a half later than most other streams in the state.

The Esopus is the only stream in the county with no minimum size restriction; up to five may be taken per day. Most fish taken are thus less than 12 inches (30 cm) in length, but in 1923 a brown trout was taken at Chimney Hole just above the reservoir that weighed 19 pounds 4 ounces (8.7 kg), a state record that stood for three decades.

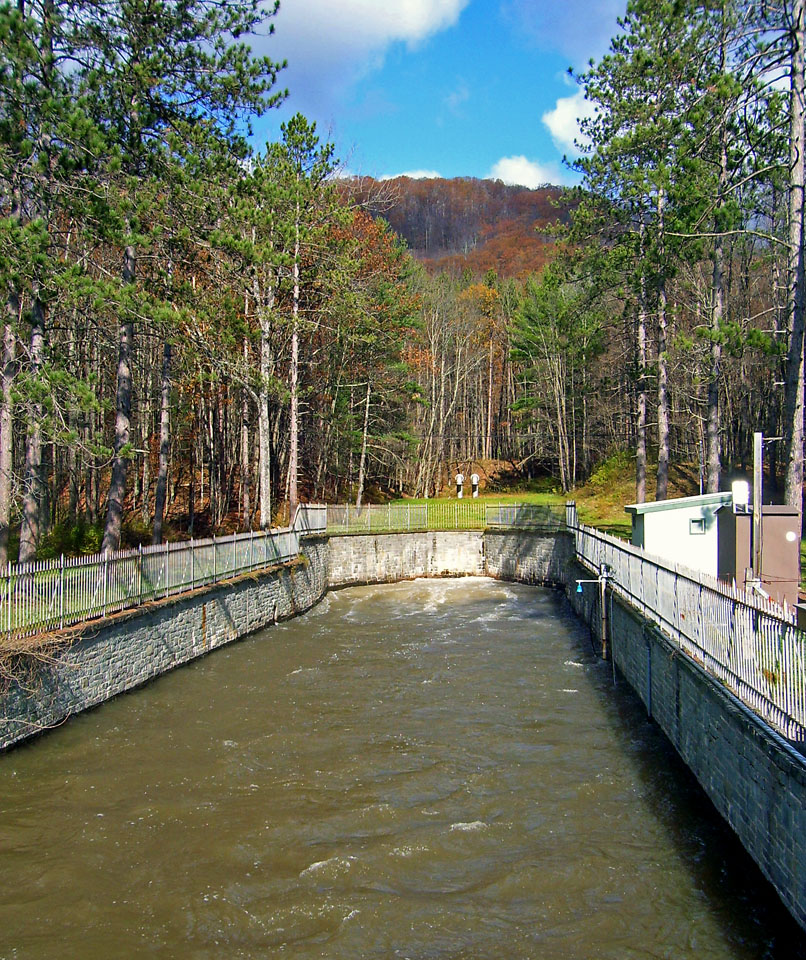
The Portal

Anglers subdivide the upper Esopus into four sections: the small Esopus, from Winnisook Lake to Big Indian, and the three sections of the big Esopus. These are from Big Indian to the Portal, from the Portal to Phoenicia, and from Phoenicia to the reservoir.

Trout, along with walleye, bass and crappie are also taken in the reservoir, where anglers must have a permit from the New York City Department of Environmental Protection (DEP) as well as a state license. They must use unpowered boats stored at designated areas along the shoreline and used only in the reservoir. Here there is a 12-inch minimum with a limit of three per day.

The creek's estuary below the dam at Saugerties has also become a popular spot for bass fishing. Several tournaments are held for both largemouth and smallmouths. Striped bass from the Hudson also spawn in the estuarine Esopus, making it a popular spot for them as well.

=== Boating ===
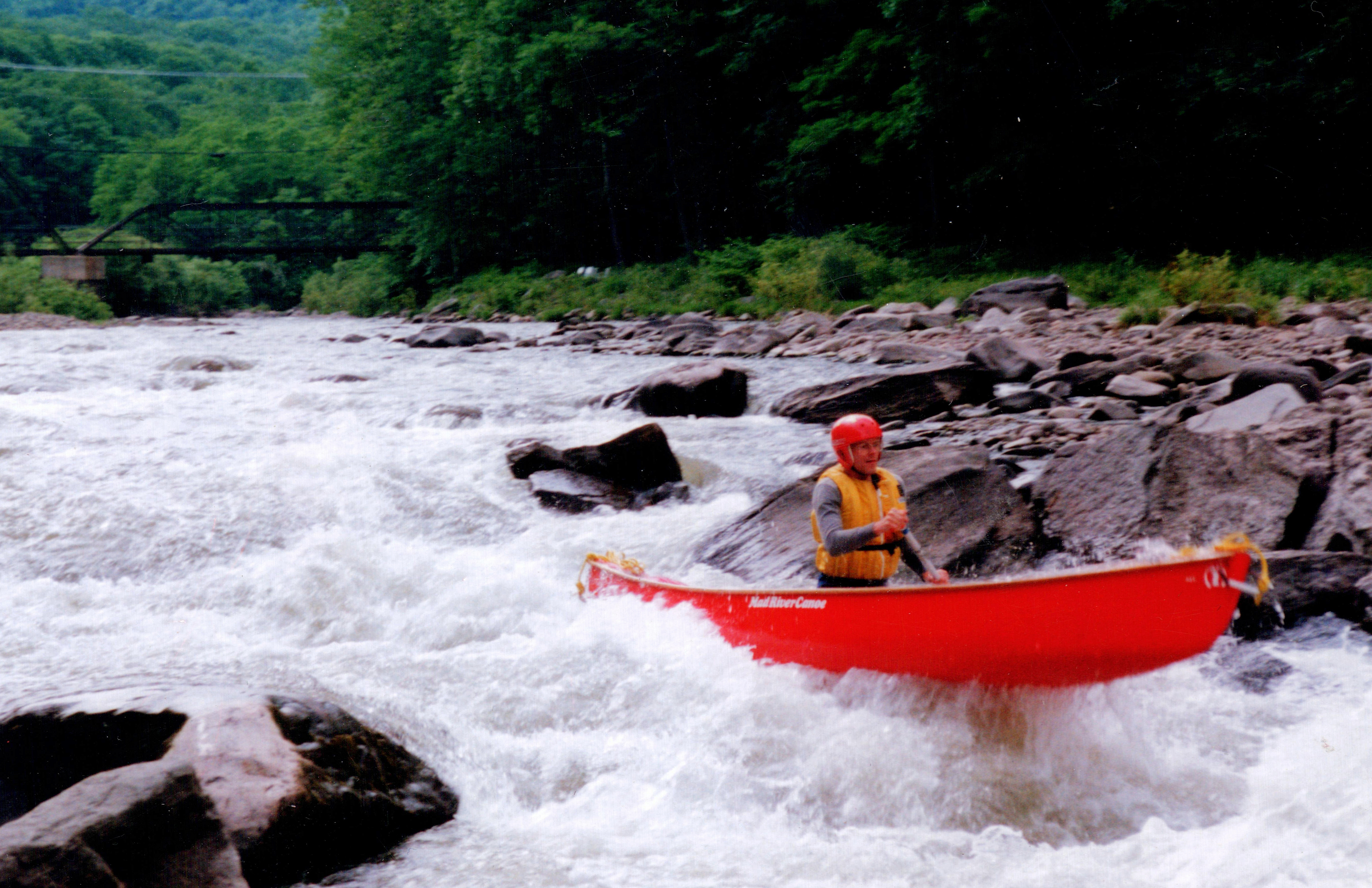
Whitewater canoeist Marty Plante paddling on Esopus Creek.

Canoeists and kayakers use the stretch from just above the Portal at Allaben to just above the reservoir at Boiceville. They only run the Esopus when the Coldbrook gauge records discharge above 800 cubic feet per second (23 m^{3}/s), or water levels between 5–6 feet (1.5–1.8 m), which usually occurs after major releases from the Portal or heavy rains. When it does, the whitewater is sufficient for the stream to reach Class II or III on the International scale of river difficulty; the 11-mile (18 km) stretch accounts for nearly 30 percent of the dam-controlled whitewater in New York, ideal for both experienced and beginning canoeists and kayakers.

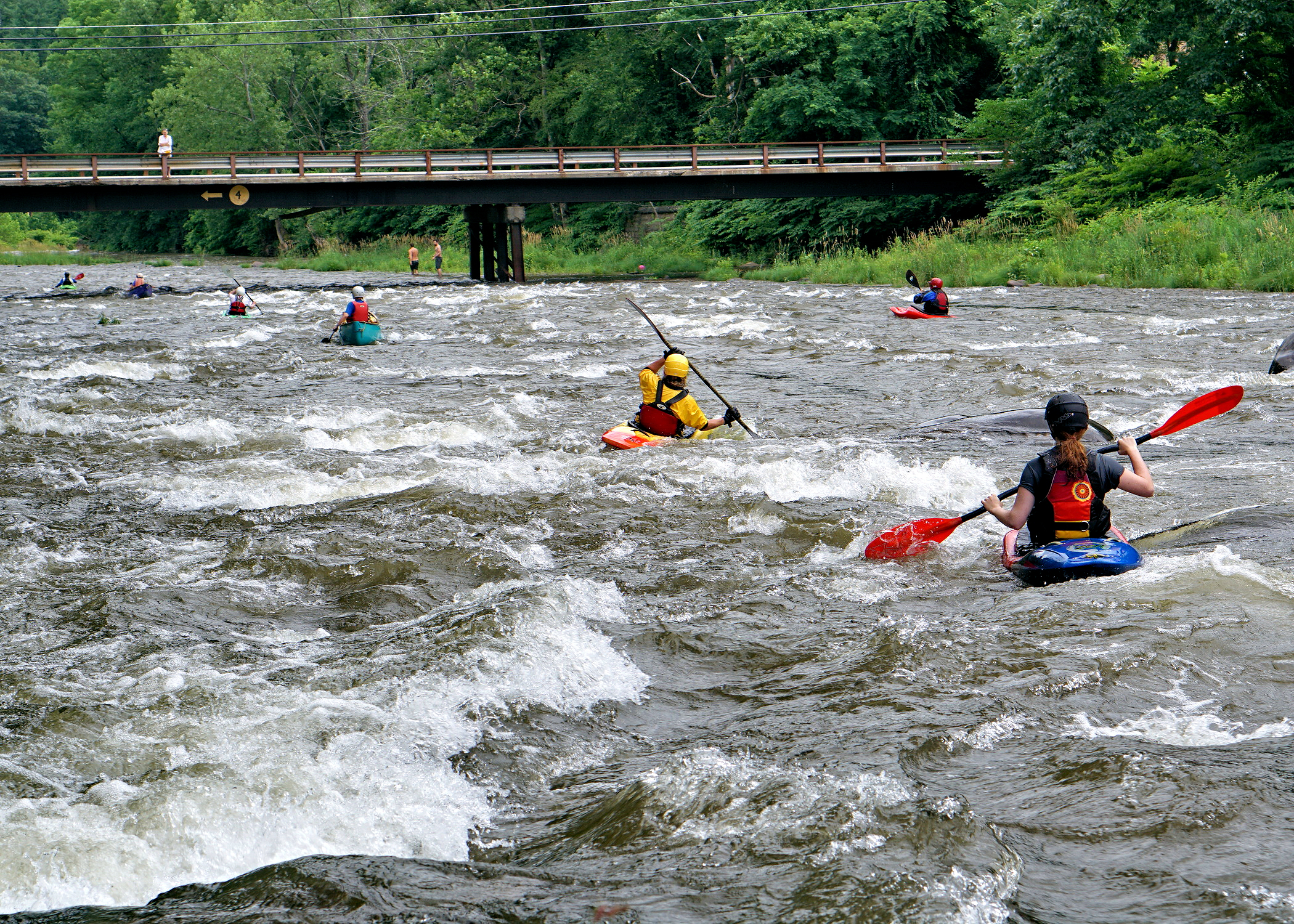
Paddlers on Esopus Creek

More regional whitewater enthusiasts have been paddling the upper Esopus since the Federal Energy Regulatory Commission stopped dam releases on Western Connecticut's Housatonic River in 2006, limiting whitewater opportunities there. The Appalachian Mountain Club and the Adirondack Mountain Club each conduct organized whitewater trips during the four release weekends. The KCCNY has its annual 400-meter (1,300 ft) whitewater slalom race in early June after one of the former. The American Canoe Association has also held its Atlantic Division Championships there every fall since 1979, and the stream hosted the 1980 U.S. Open Canoe Championship.

The lower Esopus is also attractive to boating enthusiasts who prefer flatwater. Much of it outside the Esopus Bend Nature Preserve is private property; the portion near Saugerties has been open to the public only once a year when the Esopus Creek Conservancy held its annual Decks and Docks on the Esopus fundraiser. Marinas on the estuary in Saugerties shelter craft used on the Hudson.

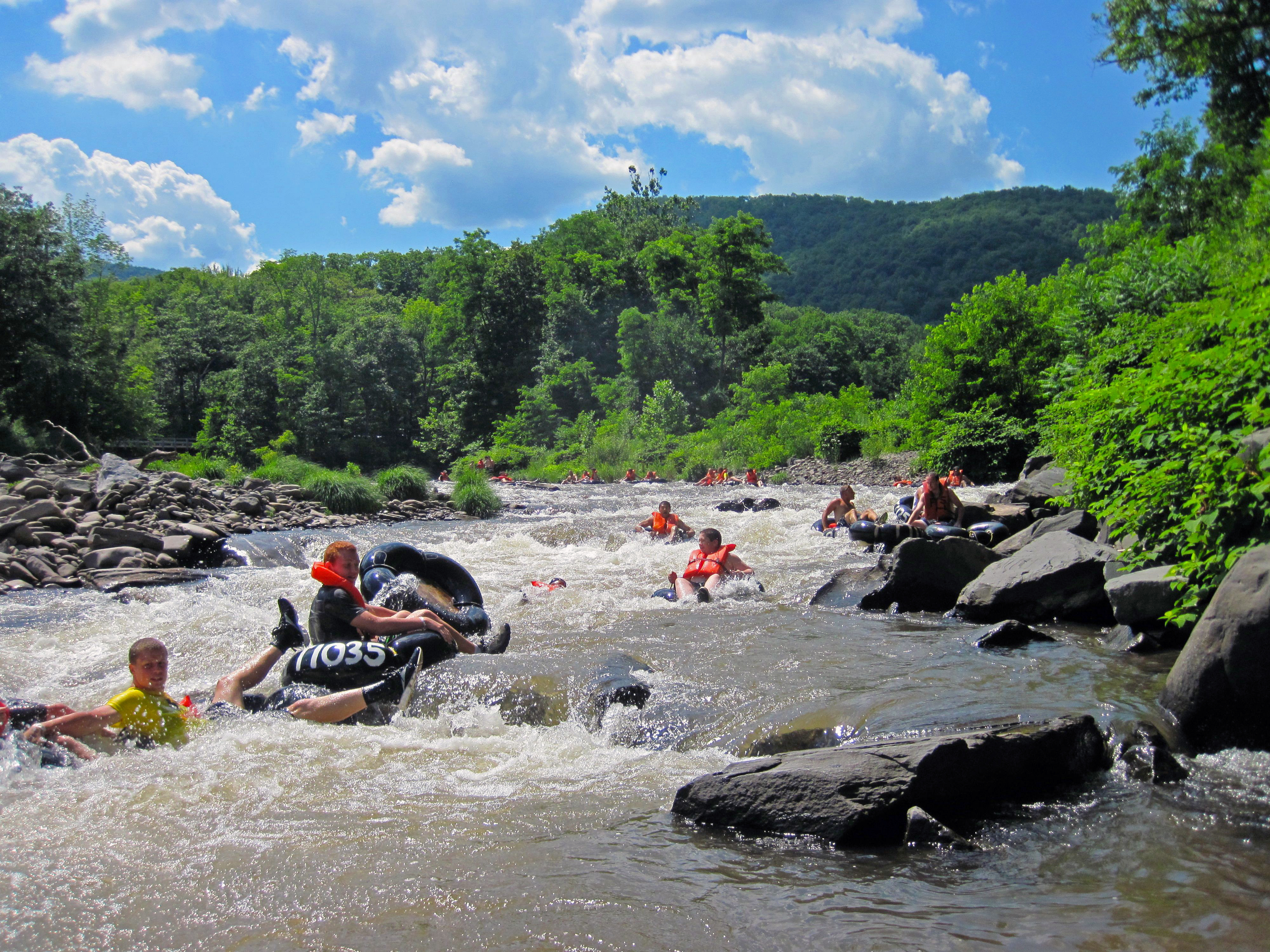
Tubers on the creek

Tubing the Esopus above and below Phoenicia has long been popular, with about 15,000 people a year taking the float. Since the 1970s, local businesses have rented tubes to visitors, and it has become a major draw to the Catskills in summertime. Some residents complained about its local impact and its negative effect on fishing. Other anglers are not as bothered by tubers, pointing out most tubing takes place during daylight hours rather than the crepuscular times at which trout are most active. The Shandaken Town Board proposed a law in 1983 that would have limited tubing to the lower stretch during prescribed hours, required bathroom facilities and levied a 10-cent surcharge on each rented tube to cover the expenses to the town. It was not adopted, but later the town required a special use permit under its zoning code. That requirement was dropped after one of the tube-rental businesses challenged it in court.

Currently, two companies in the area rent to visitors, who can choose between the wilder but more dangerous stretch north of the hamlet (not recommended for children) or the calmer stretch below it. Tubes are rented only when the stream gauge at Coldbrook indicates a level of 4–6 feet (1.2–1.8 m).

== Hydrology ==
=== Water quality ===
New York's Department of Environmental Conservation (DEC) rates the water quality of Esopus Creek in different sections. Most of the lowermost 12.7 miles (20.4 km) of the stream, from Cantine Dam in Saugerties to the Tannery Brook confluence near Kingston, is rated Class B, suitable for primary and secondary contact recreation and fishing. Weed growth along the banks between the mouth and the dam has led DEC to downgrade that reach to Class C, with limited recreational prospects.

From Tannery Brook to the Ashokan Reservoir dam, the Esopus remains Class B, albeit slightly impacted, with equivalent weed growth in many portions. The releases from the reservoir, and the stream's low gradient, are also seen as factors. The reservoir itself is considered impacted, due to pollution from atmospheric mercury, but not to levels that affect its use for drinking water, since mercury does not dissolve much in water. Phosphorus is also present, but within acceptable levels. Those pollutants have resulted in the state's Department of Health issuing an advisory to anglers that they should eat no more than one smallmouth bass over 16 inches (41 cm) long taken from the reservoir per month.

The stretch of the upper stream from the reservoir to the Portal at Allaben is rated Class A by DEC due to its use as a trout fishery. It is also considered impacted due to the turbidity of the waters released from the tunnel as well as Stony Clove Creek and Broadstreet Hollow Brook. From Allaben to Winnisook Lake the upper Esopus is class C water due to emissions from Pine Hill's wastewater treatment plant via Birch Creek. DEC's assessments found that the stream does have thriving aquatic life.

=== Discharge ===
Graph from Coldbrook USGS stream gauge showing record discharge after Hurricane Irene

The United States Geological Survey (USGS) maintains five stream gauges along Esopus Creek. The station in Coldbrook, 1.5 miles (2.4 km) upstream from Ashokan Reservoir, had a maximum discharge of 75,800 cubic feet (2,150 m^{3}) per second on August 28, 2011, as Hurricane Irene passed through the area. Minimum discharge has not been recorded. In 2019 it averaged 680.8 cu ft (19.28 m^{3}) per second.

Two more stations are further upstream. The one in Allaben, in operation since 1963 between Fox Hollow and Peck Hollow creeks, had a maximum discharge of 29,300 cubic feet (830 m^{3}) per second on August 28, 2011, during Irene and a minimum discharge of 2.1 cubic feet (0.059 m^{3}) per second in September 1983. It recorded an average flow of 204 cu ft (5.8 m^{3}) in 2019. A station at the Lost Clove Road bridge near Big Indian has been in operation since 2016. It recorded a maximum discharge of 2,190 cubic feet (62 m^{3}) per second in August 2018, and a minimum of 2 cubic feet (0.057 m^{3}) per second in October 2016; average discharge in 2019 was 82 cu ft (2.3 m^{3}) per second.

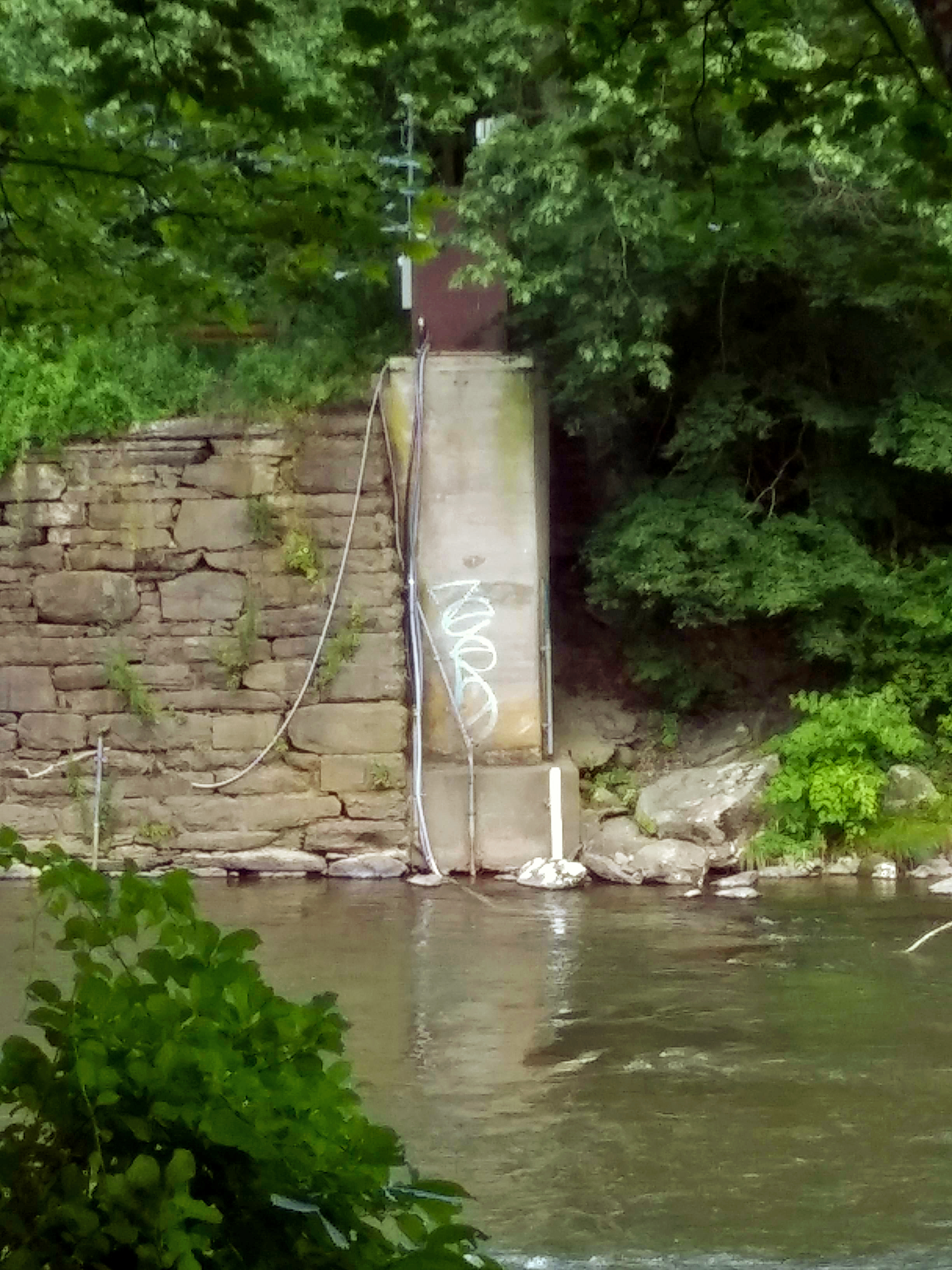
The Coldbrook gauge

Downstream, there are two more stations. Lomontville, in operation since 2013, 5.6 miles (9.0 km) below the spillway, had a maximum discharge of 4,300 cubic feet (120 m^{3}) per second in September 2015 and a minimum discharge of 2.4 cubic feet (0.068 m^{3}) per second in October 2014. Its 2019 average flow was 428.8 cu ft (12.14 m^{3}) per second. Mount Marion, at the Glasco Turnpike Bridge between Kingston and Saugerties, recorded its 30,500 cu ft/s (860 m^{3}/s) maximum during the 2005 flood, with a minimum of 5.3 cu ft (0.15 m^{3}) coming in 1999. Average flow for 2019 was 775.4 cu ft (21.96 m^{3}) per second.

During Irene, up to 16 inches (410 mm) of rain fell in some locations of the watershed over a 12-hour period. Streamflows on the creek met or surpassed the 100-year flood levels. On the upper Esopus, floodwaters filled the streets of Boiceville and Phoenicia, destroyed homes in Mount Tremper, and washed out numerous roads and bridges in Oliverea. In the 2005 flood, 2 inches (5.1 cm) to almost 6 inches (150 mm) fell in some locations, including 4.83 inches (123 mm) at the Slide Mountain station near Winnisook Lake. This along with 1 to 2 inches (25 to 51 mm) that fell a few days before produced extensive flooding on the Esopus. The DEP recorded over 3.3 inches (84 mm) of rainfall at Ashokan Reservoir. The Federal Emergency Management Agency studied 25 sites along the Esopus, and found that most sites were near the 50-year flood level. The peak level at Bushnellsville Creek in Shandaken surpassed 100-year levels.

=== Turbidity ===
In 2014 the USGS released a report on turbidity in the upper Esopus, both above and below the Portal, in light of the ongoing controversy between the city's DEP and local communities over it. The study took in data both from in situ instruments on the creek and the analysis of samples in the laboratory over the three years prior, the former of which it found better at measuring suspended sediment concentrations (SSC) in the water. Instruments were placed both on the Esopus and several tributaries above the reservoir.

The study sought to determine if it was possible to discern what the sources of turbidity in the Esopus might be, and if possible what those sources were. It found that Stony Clove Creek was the largest source of turbidity and suspended-sediment concentration, accounting for more turbidity than the rest of the upper Esopus watershed combined, with those two quantities varying directly with each other and also correlating with discharge. Those loads were markedly higher in 2012, which the authors attributed to the work done to channelize that stream near its mouth in Phoenicia that year in the wake of the flooding caused by Irene. Woodland Creek, which also empties into the Esopus at Phoenicia, was the second-largest source.

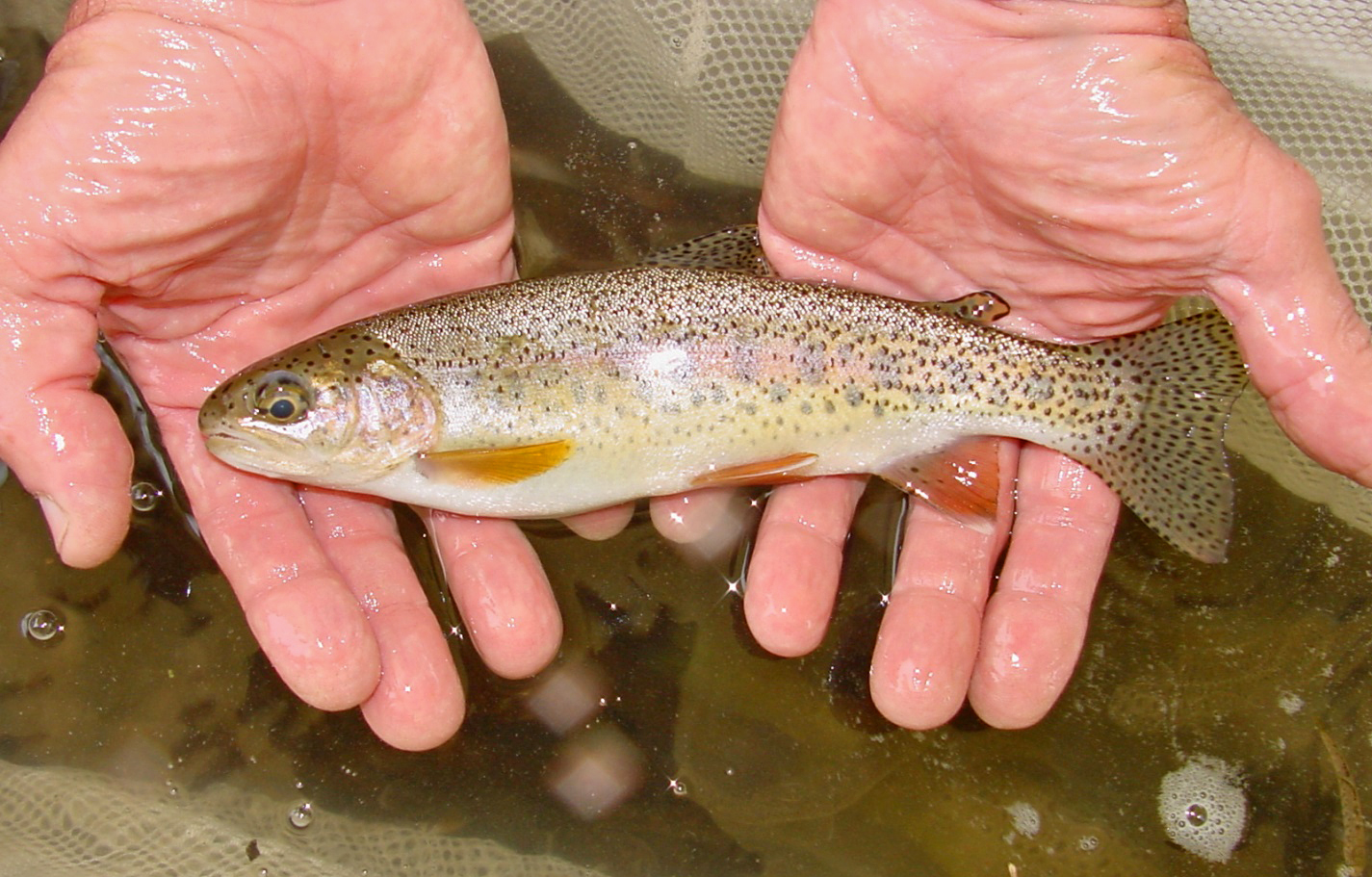
Small rainbow trout taken from the Esopus during study

Another USGS study, in 2015, considered what effect the turbidity might be having on fish populations in the upper Esopus. The authors collected data from 18 100-metre (330 ft) reaches, 10 on tributaries from the Birch to the Little Beaver Kill, and the others on the main stem from Oliverea to Boiceville annually between 2009 and 2011, primarily counting the brown trout, rainbow trout, slimy sculpin and cutlips minnow. They found some effects downstream of the portal, such as lowered density and biomass, but none significant and none that they considered negative. Another 2015 study, that took in the effect of the Irene-induced floods found that rainbow trout were the only species in the stream to have been negatively affected by them, for at least two years after the storm, although populations had been trending down for two years before. A fourth study that year which also considered that species population found that that species' density and biomass were higher in the upper Esopus than they had been since before 2010.

The USGS station along the creek near Mount Marion, between Kingston and Saugerties, collects turbidity data every 15 minutes. The maximum daily SSC mean was 439 mg/L in July 2014, and the minimum was 1 mg/L over four days seven months later. In September 2015 the maximum and minimum daily suspended sediment discharge was recorded: 6,200 tons (5,600 t) on September 30, and 0.23 tons (0.21 t) on September 8–9, respectively. Since 2013 the Lomontville station, above Kingston along the lower stream, has also been collecting turbidity data. Its maximum daily mean for SSC was 210 mg/L in March 2014, and the minimum was less than 1 mg/L on many days from 2014 to 2015. Maximum daily suspended sediment discharge was 770 tons (700,000 kg) on September 30, 2015, and the minimum was .01 ton (9.1 kg) in October 2014 and May 2015, respectively.

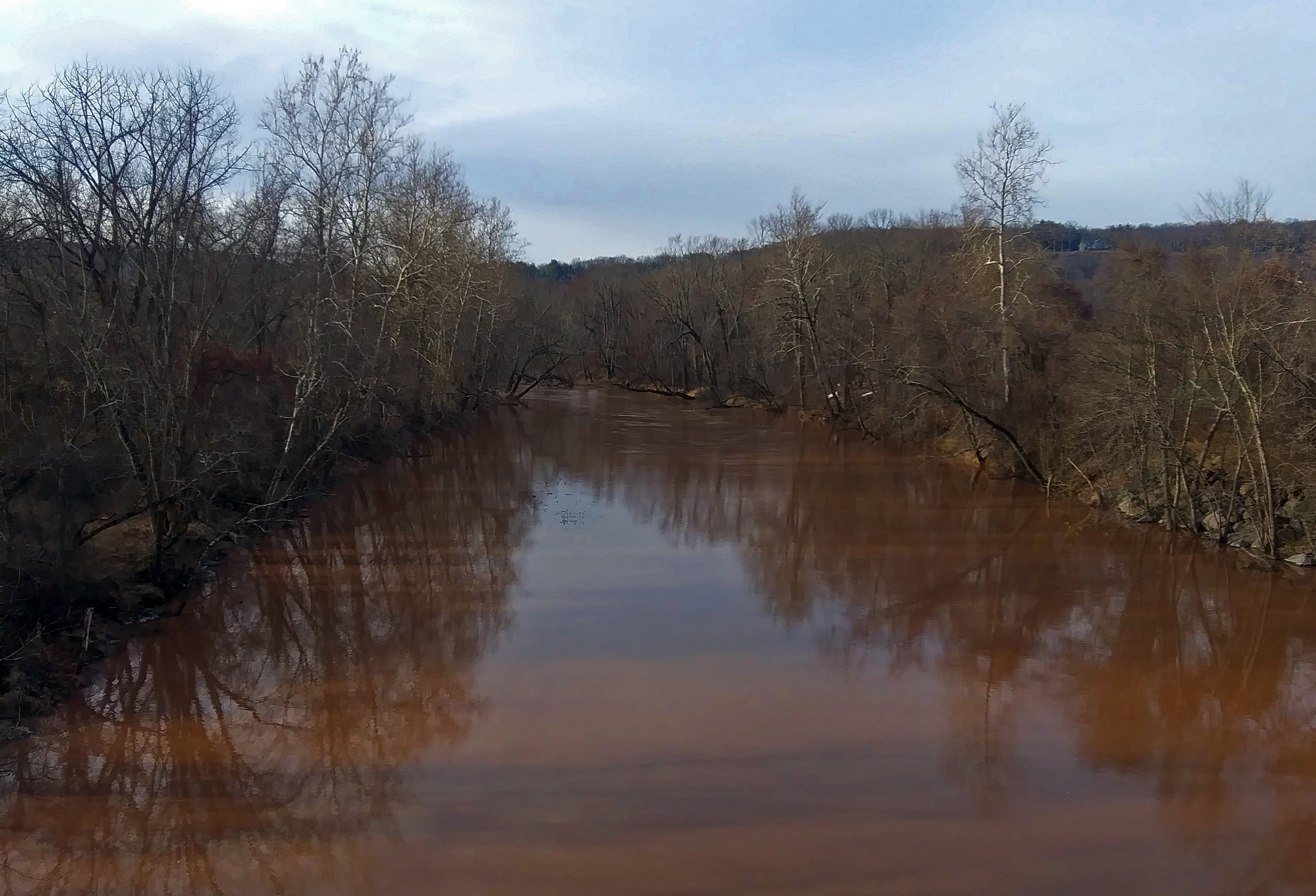
Lower Esopus turbid after heavy rains in 2021

In 2011 a study of the lower Esopus found no significant effect on benthic macroinvertebrates (BMI) at several points in the stream over the previous four years, the period when complaints about the turbidity caused by the reservoir releases began. Samples were taken both under normal flow conditions and storm discharges. In addition to BMI, they showed no effect on other metrics such as turbidity, total dissolved solids or dissolved oxygen that correlated to distance from the reservoir. A 2019 study of the BMI population in the upper Esopus found that although it had declined severely after the floods from Irene and Lee, it had mostly recovered within a year.

== Geology ==
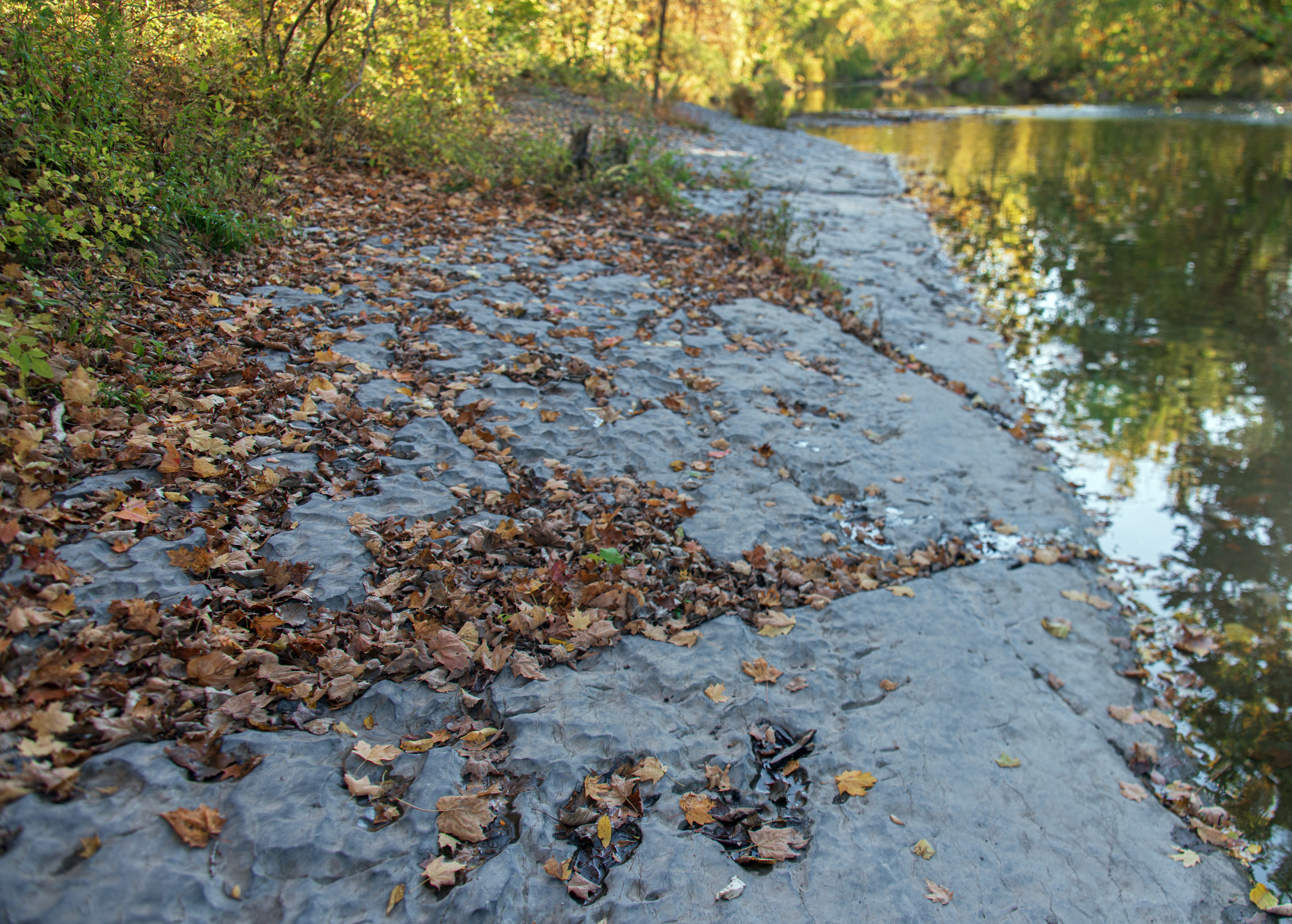
Limestone bedrock shelf as the river bank south of Hurley

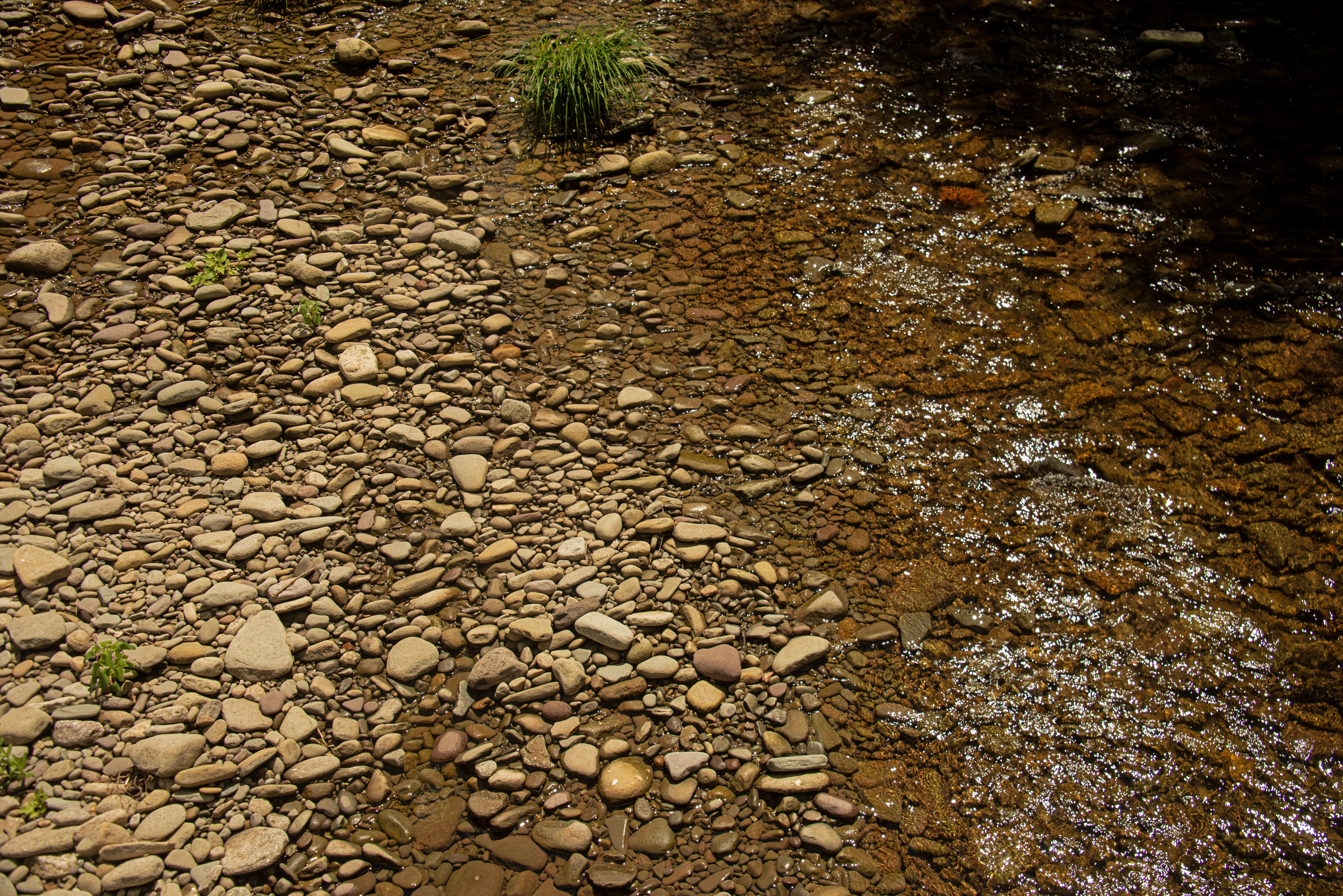
Imbrication of rocks in the stream's headwaters

Bedrock of the upper Esopus is generally sedimentary rock of the middle to late Devonian period, deposited when today's Catskills were a river delta and alluvial plain 360-390 million years ago. The stream's uppermost headwaters are underlain by bedrock of the Slide Mountain Formation, a Frasnian cross-bedded yellowish-gray conglomerate layer with quartz pebbles found at the uppermost 2,000 feet (610 m) in the Catskills. It is the youngest of the sediment layers in the mountains, deposited shortly before the entire region uplifted to form the dissected plateau it is today.

Not far below Winnisook Lake, the Slide Mountain formation gradually gives way to the Upper Walton Formation, characterized by gray and greenish-gray fine-grained sandstone with some pebbles like those seen in the stratum above. The Upper Walton soon gives way, by the point the creek receives Giant Ledge Stream, to the Lower Walton, with fine-grained sandstone and some gray shale. This layer remains the Esopus's bedrock all the way to the Bushnellsville Creek confluence.

At that point the Oneonta Formation takes over for the rest of the upper Esopus. The Oneonta's bedrock is more coarse-grained cross-bedded lighter gray sandstone with some red shale beds. Siltstones and claystones are also present.

Below the Ashokan Reservoir, the Catskill sediments continue to underlie the lower Esopus, this time in the form of the region's lowest and oldest layer, the Givetian Plattekill Formation. It is characterized by grayish-red claystone and shale interbedded with medium dark gray shale and cross-bedded sandstone.

Just above its bend to the northeast at Marbletown, the Catskill sediments end, giving way to the limestone underneath the broad flood plains to Kingston. This reach continues north of the city, with oxbow lakes and meander scroll indicating the occurrence of many active floods in the recent past. North of Leggs Mill Road the bedrock changes again to tightly folded shale as the Esopus drops through a fault at Glenerie Falls and into the narrow valley, itself a fault between shale and the limestone layers on the adjoining ridges, that takes it to its mouth at Saugerties.

The Esopus's surficial geology reflects the effect of past glaciations on the Catskills. It begins with glacial till covering the bedrock at the stream's steep uppermost reaches, giving way to kame deposits on the north bank for another short stretch and then till again. At Allaben outwash sand and gravel takes over. The streambed rocks are generally imbricated, keeping them stable except in heavy floods.

Below the reservoir, the outwash gives way in some areas to sand barrens. The fertile soils of the many farms alongside the creek characterize the surface of the floodplain reach. The lower reach, once part of the glacial Lake Albany, still has the clays and silt from its days as a lake bottom.

== Conservation and management ==
The upper and lower Esopus have different conservation and management issues as a result of the reservoir's intervention. Management of the upper stream is more hands-on due to its major role in New York City's water supply system, its importance as a recreational resource and its location amid the Forest Preserve. Below the reservoir it is not a source of drinking water, and its surrounding land is more heavily farmed. Conservation efforts on that stretch primarily focus on its aesthetic and ecological role.

=== Upper Esopus ===
The upper Esopus, located within both the Catskill Park and the New York City watershed, is closely monitored by both the state DEC and the city DEP. Between the DEC's Forest Preserve holdings, city-owned buffer lands and privately held forested parcels, 99 percent of the land in the upper watershed is forested. Trout fishermen are also active through groups like Trout Unlimited in working to keep the creek's water clean, although their interests sometimes clash with the city's.

According to the 2007 Upper Esopus management plan compiled by DEP, the Cornell Cooperative Extension and the U.S. Army Corps of Engineers for the Ashokan Watershed Stream Management Program, a joint program run by DEP, Cornell and the Ulster County Soil and Water Conservation District, water quality in that part of the stream is generally good. Property owners and other stakeholders in the stream expressed concern about flooding risks and attendant erosion problems. The plan did not find any evidence that floods have become more common in the last century (before Hurricane Irene four years after the report, the record flood for the stream occurred in 1980, with discharges of 65,300 cubic feet per second (1,850 m^{3}/s) recorded above the reservoir and was calculated to be a 40-year flood), despite two heavy floods in the preceding decade. It recommends that new construction on the creek's flood plain be avoided wherever possible and that flood control measures and warning systems be improved along the length of the upper creek.

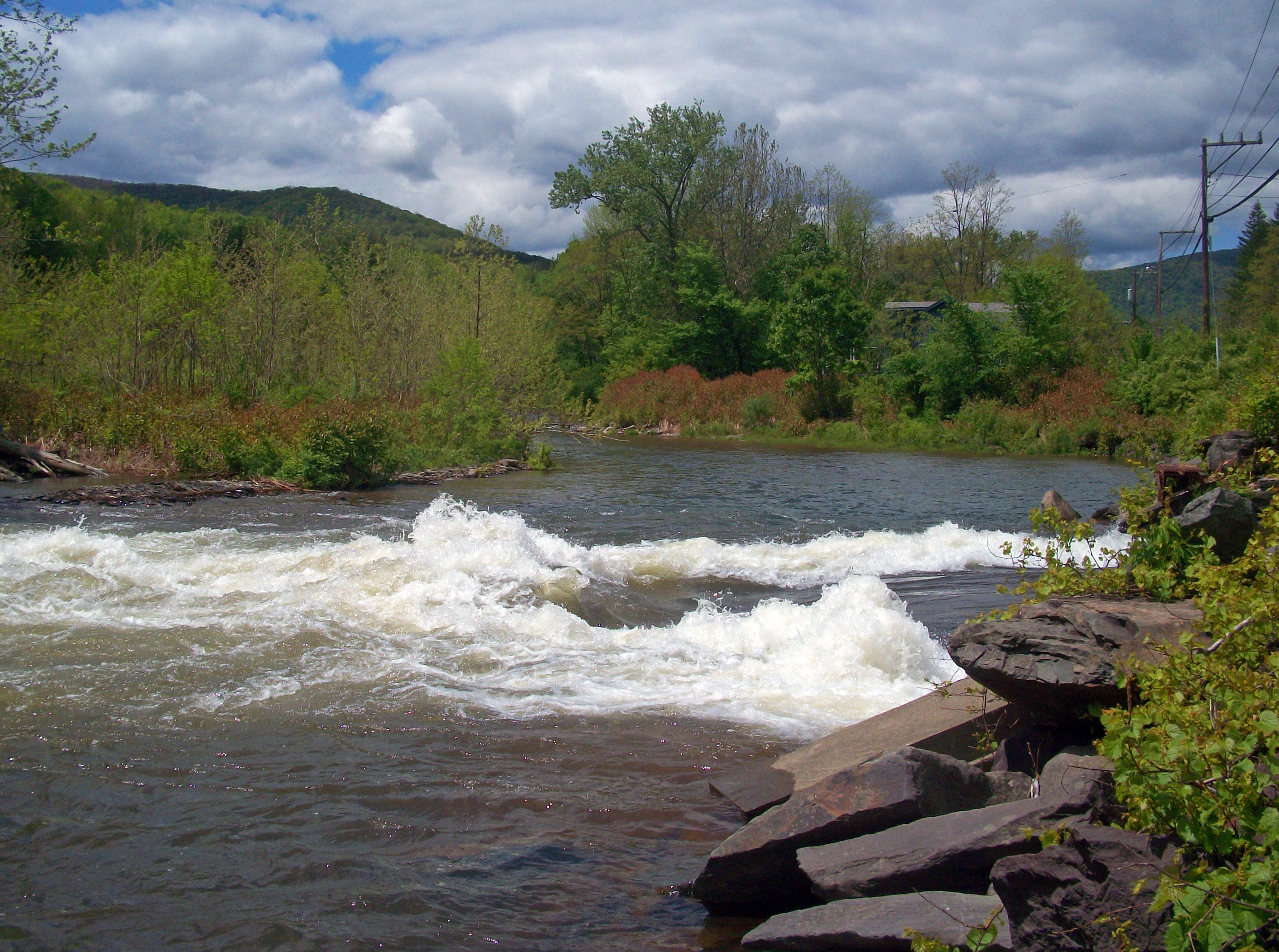
Portal discharge in spring

The Portal's effect on the creek's fishery is a continuing source of friction. For a long time after its construction it was believed to have a positive effect on the trout, but after the floods of 1996 some fishermen began complaining that the waters from Schoharie have been too turbid and warm (some calling it "Yoo Hoo Creek"), with the rainbow trout population declining as a consequence. New York's Department of Environmental Conservation (DEC) says it has found no sign of that, but in 2000 the Catskills chapter of Trout Unlimited, Riverkeeper and some other groups sued the city, arguing the Portal releases into the creek violated the federal Clean Water Act. After lengthy litigation the city was eventually required to get a state permit for the discharges. Environmental groups have said the problems would be solved if the Schoharie, like all the other city reservoirs, had a multi-level discharge structure, allowing water to be taken from the less turbid surface as well as the cooler depths.

Boater and tuber user groups depend on releases from the Portal, which can add up to 900 cubic feet per second (25 m^{3}/s) to the creek's flow, to make those activities possible. Their interests also sometimes differ with the stream's angling community on the question of large woody debris (LWD), such as trees or limbs loosened from the banks during floods. Those usually come to rest in the stream, sometimes at bridge abutments, creating habitat for trout and other aquatic life but creating navigational hazards. In 2002 a kayaker and tuber were killed in separate instances as a result of LWD in the stream; both deaths led to lawsuits against property owners. The management plan has recommended clarifying the liability issues.

Riparian buffers are another issue to be addressed. Most of the upper Esopus has at least 100 feet (30 m) of buffer on either side, but there are portions with 25 feet (7.6 m) or less and 6.25 miles (10.06 km) have no buffer at all, with revetments shoring up the sides next to the highway or the railroad. The buffers are mostly closed-canopy floodplain forests, with mowed lawns making up the remainder.

==== Invasive species ====
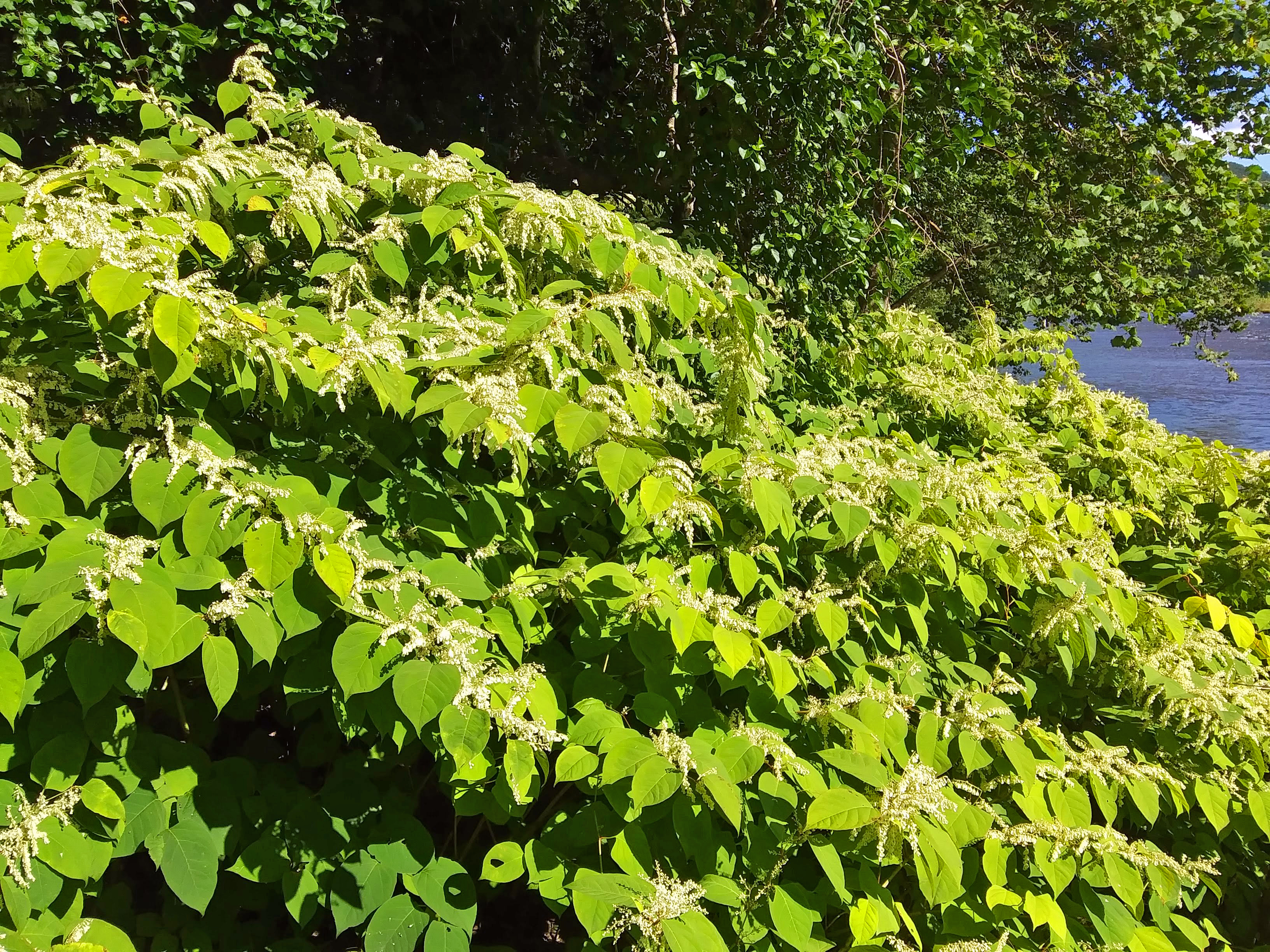
Japanese knotweed on the creek bank near Boiceville.

In recent years colonies of Japanese knotweed, an invasive species, have been observed along the banks and in buffer areas. They are considered detrimental to the stream's health since they do not provide shade, are less effective at controlling erosion and, since they grow in thick clusters, impede access to the stream.

Oriental bittersweet, a vine which kills the trees in buffer forests by wrapping itself tightly around them, has also been observed in some areas. The stream management plan recommends that a comprehensive plan be developed for controlling and eradicating both species, and any others that may be found in the future.

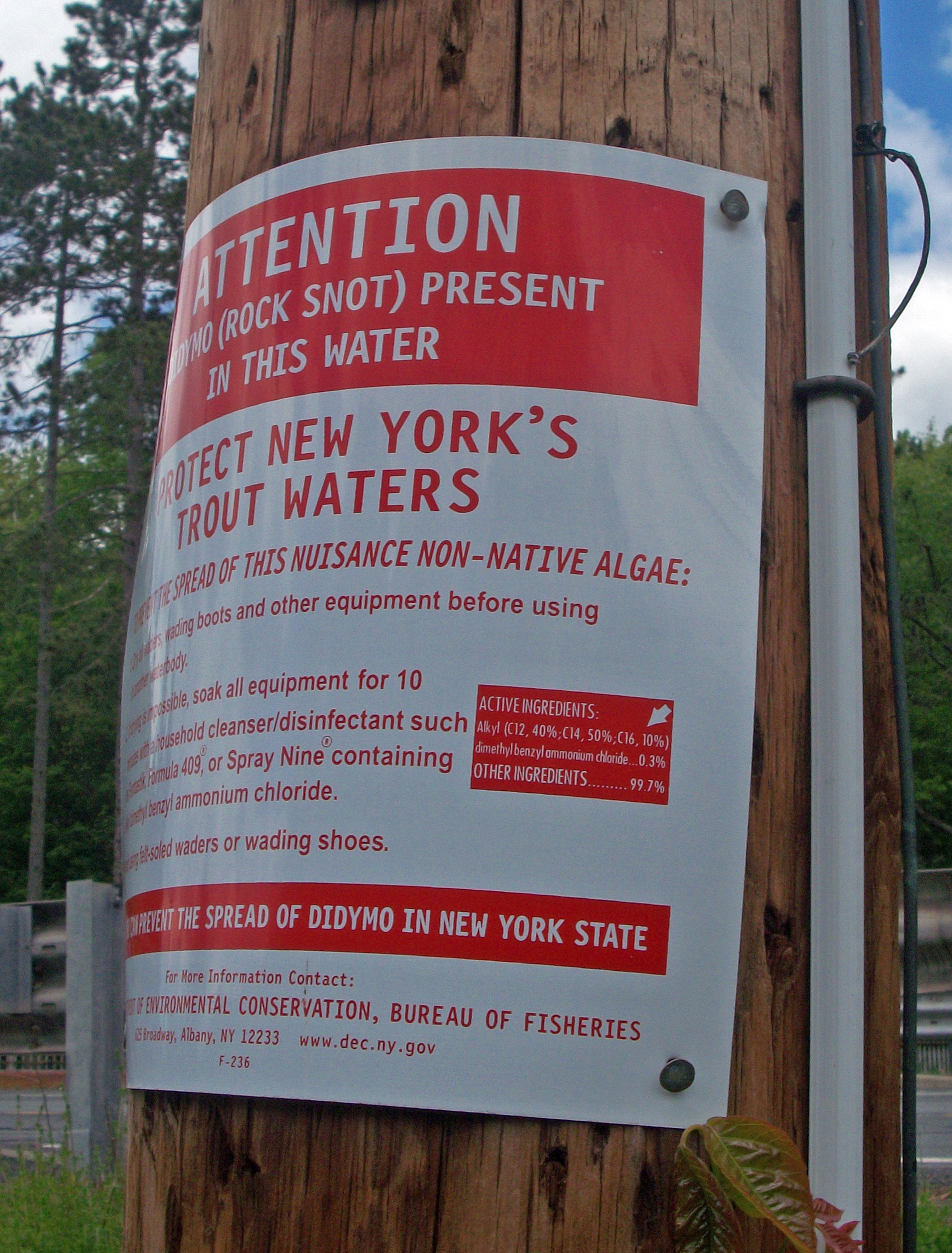
"Rock snot" advisory sign

In 2009, the invasive species problem in the buffers was complicated further by the confirmed arrival of Didymosphenia geminata, an algae species commonly referred to as "rock snot", in the creek's waters between Shandaken and the reservoir. It was the third stream in the state where it has been found, after Batten Kill in Washington County and the East and West branches of the Delaware River in Delaware County, just to the west of the Esopus valley. The species can clog water intakes but poses no threat to human life. Trout are more at risk because it often grows over river bottoms, smothering the insect hatches they depend on as a food source. There is no way at present to eradicate the species; the state has instead advised fishermen to thoroughly clean and disinfect their waders after trips in order to slow its growth and prevent it from reaching other streams.

Research done by the USGS's New York Water Science Center in 2015 found that D. geminata had not appeared to impair the creek's fishery and aquatic life in general significantly, based on periphyton samples taken from 6–20 locations along the upper Esopus on five occasions during 2009–10. The algae was most abundant during that period at sites just downstream from the Portal. The authors speculated that the suspended sediment and phosphates in the water may limit blooms.

=== Lower Esopus ===
Conservation and management efforts in the lower Esopus are not as coordinated as they are in the upper stream, and there is no stream management plan. Most efforts have been spearheaded by local municipalities. In the wake of the 2005 flood, the towns of the lower Esopus and the city of Kingston began holding an annual Esopus Creek Lower Basin Watershed Conference. One of its chief concerns was the effects of that flood on the region: it took some farmers several months to recover.

Much of the farmland affected by the flood was located in the town of Marbletown, first along the stream's lower course. Silt and other eroded materials piled up on the land and had to be removed, and some of the farmland was lost permanently. Marbletown has planned to work with its farmers to acquire development rights to at least 750 acres (300 ha) outside the creek's flood plain, which cannot be developed, and further protect the rare plant and animal communities along the creek in addition to minimizing the effect of any future floods.

Flooding concerns in the lower Esopus have also led to criticism of the DEP for maintaining the reservoir at capacity levels that may be higher than necessary, requiring releases during periods of heavy rain that aggravate flooding. In 2010 the city began implementing new computer software that more closely monitors water levels in all its reservoirs as well as data that allows it to estimate near term water availability. Local officials praised the move but said they would keep working for DEP to be more conscious of its impact on downstream property owners.

Further downstream, in the Saugerties area, conservation efforts have been led by the Esopus Creek Conservancy, a non-profit organization that works to conserve the landscapes and ecosystems around the creek. It was created in 1999 from a local citizen's efforts to protect a section of creekside property from development. Five years later, with the help of the Catskill Center for Conservation and Development, the land was purchased and the conservancy formed. It is now the 161-acre (65 ha) Esopus Bend Nature Preserve, just outside the village of Saugerties, that protects a long stretch of crucial habitat along the south shore of the creek. Trails within it lead to views over the creek to the Catskill Escarpment beyond. Nevertheless, in January 2013 the EPA directed the state to act on the muddy lower Esopus, which it classified as "impaired".

In 2007, the Lower Esopus Watershed Partnership (LEWP), a coalition of several municipalities, was founded "to foster appreciation and stewardship of the Lower Esopus Watershed."

== Tributaries ==
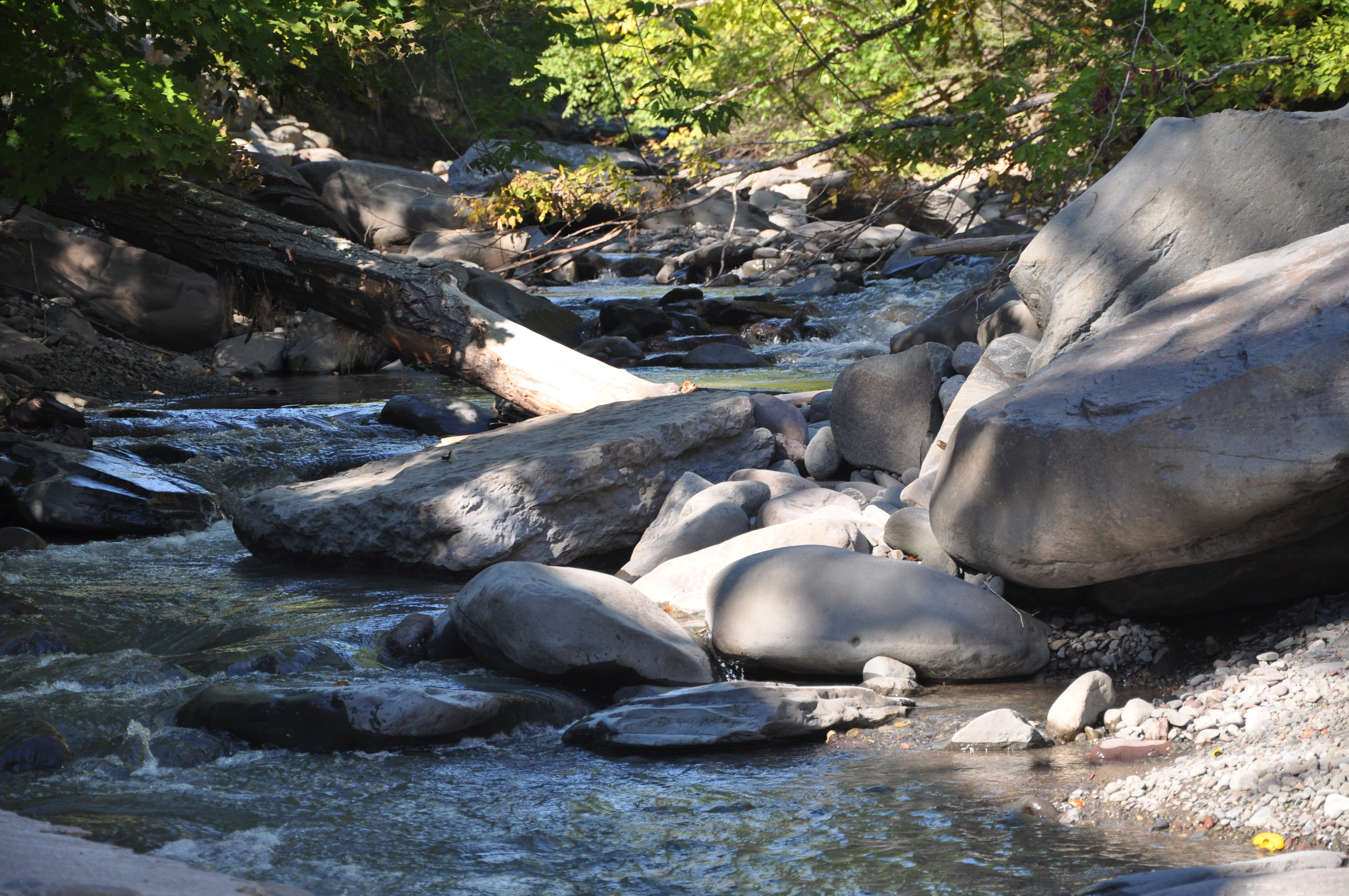
The Saw Kill

- Birch Creek
- Bushnellsville Creek
- Elk Bushkill
- Fox Hollow Brook
- Giant Ledge Stream
- Hanging Birds Nest Brook
- Hatchery Hollow Brook
- Seneca Hollow Stream
- Maben Hollow Brook
- McKenley Hollow Brook
- Lost Clove Creek
- Shandaken Tunnel
- Peck Hollow Creek
- Broadstreet Hollow Creek
- Woodland Creek
- Stony Clove Creek
- Beaver Kill
- Little Beaver Kill
- Bush Kill
- Saw Kill
- Plattekill Creek
- Tannery Brook (Saugerties)
- Tannery Brook (Kingston)
- Stony Creek

== See also ==
- List of fly fishing waters in North America
- List of rivers of New York
