= List of Ulster and Delaware Railroad stations =

This is a list of railroad stations on the former Ulster and Delaware Railroad and their present-day condition. For more information, see the main article.

== Main Line stations ==
Station	Place Served	Image	Opened	Closed	Notes
Kingston Point	Kingston Point		1895	1924	Constructed for easier access to steamboats on Hudson River.
Rondout	Rondout		1868	1979	Headquarters of the U&D. Received considerable business from the Delaware & Hudson Canal.
Kingston	Kingston		1883	March 31, 1954	Replaced original "Fair Street Station". Torn down in the 1960s.
Stony Hollow	Stony Hollow	none present	1868	1920s	Served as flagstop for most of its later life.
West Hurley	West Hurley		1869	March 31, 1954	Original wood station demolished after construction of the Ashokan Reservoir. New station constructed of cement bricks. Located on West Hurley Dike of the Ashokan Reservoir.
Olive Branch	Olive Branch		1869	June 8, 1913	Demolished after construction of Ashokan Reservoir.
Brown's Station	Brown's Station		1869	June 8, 1913	Relocated to town of Ashokan to make way for Ashokan Reservoir. Currently in Woodstock, New York.
Ashokan	Ashokan	none present	June 8, 1913	March 31, 1954	Formerly Brown's Station. Moved six miles uphill during construction of Ashokan Reservoir. Moved to Woodstock, New York in the 1970s.
Brodhead's Bridge	Brodhead's Bridge		1869	June 8, 1913	Demolished after construction of Ashokan Reservoir.
Shokan	Shokan		1869	June 8, 1913	Demolished after construction of Ashokan Reservoir.
Boiceville	Boiceville		1870	June 8, 1913	Demolished after construction of Ashokan Reservoir.
Cold Brook	Cold Brook	none present	1870; 2005	March 31, 1954	Original station replaced by pre-fabricated version in 1899. Current version being used as hunting club and the Catskill Mountain Railroad.
Mount Pleasant	Mount Pleasant		1870; 1983	March 31, 1954	New Mount Pleasant station built at Route 28 grade crossing in 1983; currently used by Catskill Mountain Railroad.
Phoenicia	Phoenicia		1870; 1983	March 31, 1954	Original station built by Rondout & Oswego made of cement; replaced by pre-fabricated station in 1899. Junction with Stony Clove & Kaaterskill branch line. Current headquarters of the Empire State Railway Museum & Railbikes Catskill Division. On National Register of Historic Places.
Shandaken	Allaben	none present	1870	March 31, 1954	Pre-fabricated station replaced previous bluestone-made "Allaben Station" in 1899.
Big Indian	Big Indian		1870	March 31, 1954	Intentionally razed by State of New York in 1960s.
Pine Hill	Pine Hill	none present	1871	March 31, 1954	Station halfway up the Pine Hill Grade.
Grand Hotel	Highmount	none present	1871	March 31, 1954	Station also served Grand Hotel on Monka Hill, hence its name. Former site of station is current eastern terminus of the Delaware & Ulster Railride.
Fleischmann's	Fleischmann's	none present	1871; 1983	March 31, 1954	Originally called Griffin's Corners station until the town it served was renamed. Freight house currently used by Delaware & Ulster Railride.
Arkville	Arkville		1871; 1983	March 31, 1954	Junction with Delaware and Northern Railroad. Originally known as Dean's Corners station until town received name change. Destroyed by runaway milktruck in 1960s. Arkville freight house currently used as headquarters of the Delaware & Ulster Railide.
Kelly's Corners	Kelly's Corners	none present	1871	March 31, 1954	Originally a flagstop. Shut down and became a flagstop again in 1923.
Halcottville	Halcottville		1871	March 31, 1954	Split in half after disuse. One half located a few hundred feet from original location; used as privately owned shed. Other half in Arkville, New York; used as a tool shed for Delaware & Ulster Railride.
Roxbury	Roxbury		1872	March 31, 1954	Currently serves as northern terminus of Delaware & Ulster Railride. Under restoration by Ulster & Delaware Railroad Historical Society.
Grand Gorge	Grand Gorge	none present	1872; 1983	March 31, 1954	Originally known as Moresville station until town received name change. Original station burnt down in 1895.New station torn down by Penn Central in the 1970s.
South Gilboa	South Gilboa	none present	1872	March 31, 1954	Original station replaced with pre-fabricated version in 1900. Current plans for restoration by Town of Gilboa Historical Society. On National Register of Historic Places.
Stamford	Stamford	none present	1872	March 31, 1954	Restored by Catskill Revitalization Corporation.
Hobart	Hobart	none present	1884	March 31, 1954	Burnt down in the 1970s.
South Kortright	South Kortright	none present	1885	March 31, 1954	Currently being used as a house.
Bloomville	Bloomville	none present	1887	March 31, 1954	Temporarily served as western terminus of U&D until 1895.
Kortright	Kortright	none present	1890	1920s	Shut down in 1920s and used as flagstop.
East Meredith	East Meredith	none present	1895	March 31, 1954	Shut down in 1954 and used as tool shed until the 1990s. Currently used as house.
Davenport Center	Davenport Center	none present	1897	March 31, 1954	Currently used as house.
West Davenport	West Davenport	none present	1899	1923	Junction with Cooperstown and Charlotte Valley Railroad. Original station burnt down in 1903. Cooperstown and Charlotte Valley station moved and used until it was shut down in 1923. It burnt down in 1933.
Oneonta	Oneonta	none present	1900	March 31, 1954	Largest station on U&D except one at Kingston. Currently a restaurant/pub called "The Depot".

== Branch stations ==
=== Stony Clove and Kaaterskill Branch ===
Station	Place Served	Image	Opened	Closed	Notes
Phoenicia	Phoenicia		1870; 1983	March 31, 1954	Original station built by Rondout & Oswego made of cement; replaced by pre-fabricated station in 1899. Junction with Stony Clove & Kaaterskill branch line. Current headquarters of the Catskill Mountain Railroad. On National Register of Historic Places.
Chichester	Chichester	none present	1881	January 22, 1940	Burnt down in 1903. Replaced with shelter. Run as flagstop by New York Central until branches were abandoned in 1939.
Lanesville	Lanesville		1883	January 22, 1940	Run as flagstop by New York Central. Burnt down in the 1960s.
Edgewood	Edgewood	none present	1881	January 22, 1940	Smallest station on railroad. Run as flagstop by New York Central.
Stony Clove Notch	none	none present	1881	January 22, 1940	Flagstop for its entire life. Completely shut down by New York Central.
Kaaterskill Junction	none		1882	January 22, 1940	Junction with Hunter branch line. Extremely busy under U&D ownership. Run as flagstop by New York Central. Transformed into home, but burnt down in the 1980s.
Tannersville	Tannersvile		June 25, 1883	January 22, 1940	Original station replaced with pre-fabricated designed station. One of only two branch line stations left open by New York Central. Converted to Town Center/snow plow garage. Burnt down in the 1970s.
Haines Falls	Haines Falls		June 25, 1883	January 22, 1940	Formerly known as Haines Corners Station until town received name change. Run as flagstop by New York Central. Currently the headquarters of the Mountain Top Historical Society.
Laurel House	none	none present	June 25, 1883	January 22, 1940	Formerly a platform. Converted to pre-fabricated station in 1900. Run as flagstop by New York Central. Burnt down by State of New York in the 1960s.
Kaaterskill	Kaaterskill	none present	June 25, 1883	January 22, 1940	Burnt down in the 1960s.

=== Hunter Branch ===
Station	Place Served	Image	Opened	Closed	Notes
Hunter	Hunter		1882	January 22, 1940	One of only two branch line stations left open by New York Central. Currently a private dwelling.

== Bibliography ==
- Interstate Commerce Commission (1940). Decisions of the Interstate Commerce Commission of the United States (Finance Reports). Washington D.C.: Government Printing Office.
