= Rondout =

Rondout may refer to some places and buildings in the United States:

In Illinois:

- Rondout, Illinois

In New York:

- Rondout, New York, a village located on the north side of Rondout Creek near its mouth on the Hudson River in Ulster County
- Rondout Creek, a tributary of the Hudson River
- Rondout Railroad Station, the first station built on the Ulster and Delaware Railroad
- Rondout Reservoir, a New York City Reservoir in Ulster and Sullivan Counties
- Rondout Valley High School, a public high school in Accord
