= South Gilboa station =

South Gilboa
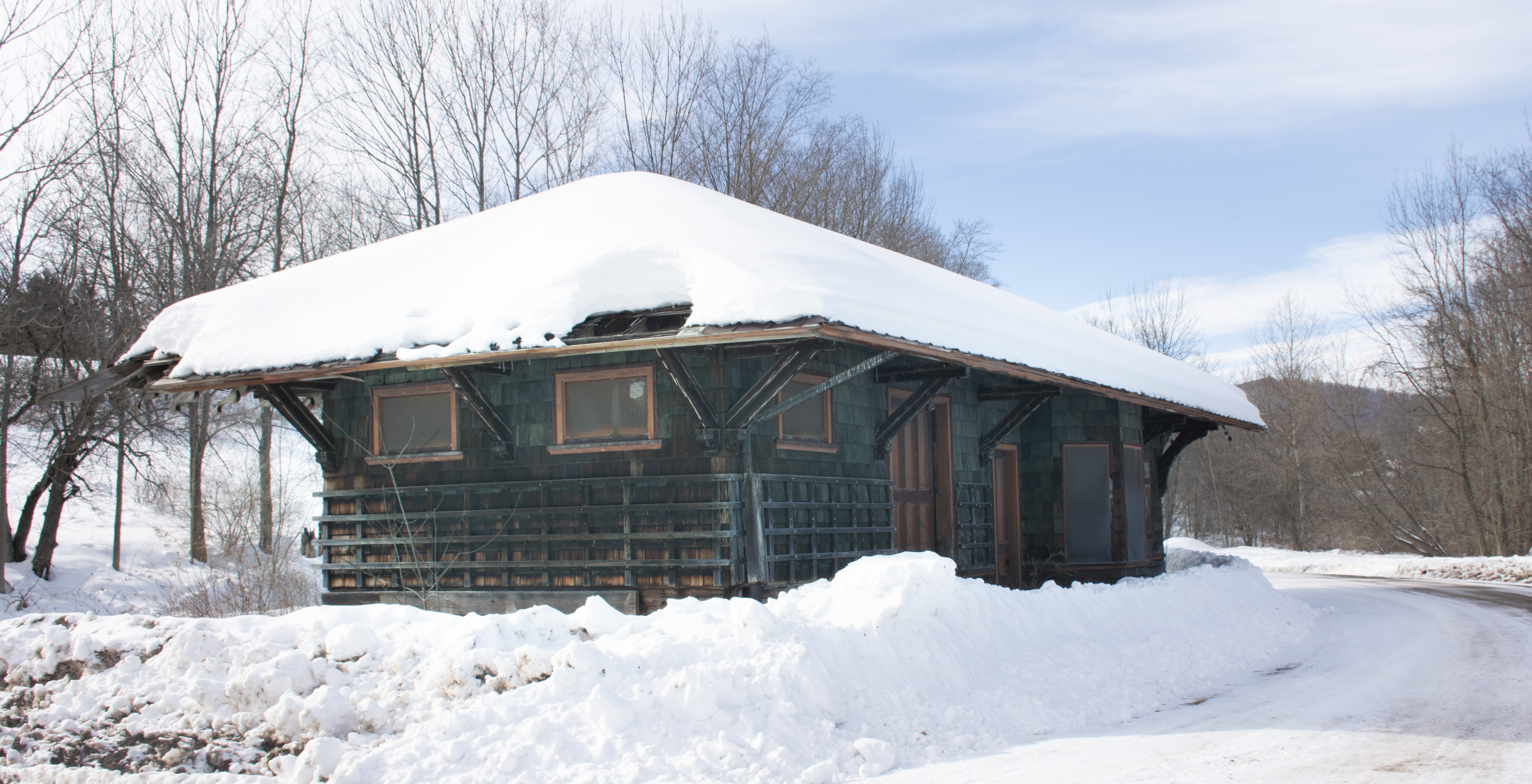

General information
- Location: Bailey Spur Road, South Gilboa, Schoharie County, New York
- Tracks: 1

History
- Closed: March 31, 1954

Services
Preceding station	New York Central Railroad	Following station
Stamford toward Oneonta	Catskill Mountain Branch	Grand Gorge toward Kingston Point
- South Gilboa Railroad Station
- U.S. National Register of Historic Places
- Location within New York Location within the United States
- Location: Bailey Spur Rd., South Gilboa, New York
- Coordinates: 42°24′36″N 74°33′30″W
- Area: 2.7 acres (1.1 ha)
- Built: 1905
- Architectural style: Stick/eastlake
- NRHP reference No.: 00000090
- Added to NRHP: February 25, 2000
Location

South Gilboa station is a disused train station in South Gilboa, New York. The original station, at MP 70.4, was a spartan facility with a long platform on the end for ice from Mayham Pond, near the station, to be loaded onto freight cars. The ice would then be shipped to ice houses in Kingston, New York. However, this building was torn down by the Ulster and Delaware Railroad, and replaced with a new one in the early 1900s.

The new South Gilboa station, MP 70.6, was one of the U&D's new pre-fabricated stations that were set up in the early 1900s. It was about a quarter of a mile east of the original station, and was a good freight stop, with many farms around for vegetables, fruit, dairy, etc. to be loaded onto freight cars for shipment.

This station was abandoned on March 31, 1954, with the end of passenger service on the U&D, and was left to deteriorate. However, this station is planned to be restored by the Town of Gilboa Historical Society. It was listed on the National Register of Historic Places in 2000 as the South Gilboa Railroad Station.
