= Catskill Mountain Railroad =

Railroad in New York

Coordinates: 41.935354°N 74.015094°W

- Terminus: Kingston-Stony Hollow, New York

Commercial operations
- Built by: Ulster & Delaware Railroad
- Original gauge: 4 ft 8 1/2 in (1,435 mm)

Preserved operations
- Owned by: Ulster County, New York
- Operated by: Catskill Mountain Railroad
- Reporting mark: CMRR
- Preserved gauge: 4 ft 8 1/2 in (1,435 mm)

Commercial history
- Closed: 1976

Preservation history
- August 9, 1982: CMRR begins operations
- Headquarters: Kingston, New York

Website
- catskillmountainrailroad.com/

The Catskill Mountain Railroad (reporting mark CMRR) is a heritage tourist railroad based in Kingston, New York, that began operations in 1982. The railroad leases a 4.7-mile portion (MP 3.6 to MP 8.3) of the former New York Central Railroad Catskill Mountain branch from Kingston to Stony Hollow, New York. The tracks are owned by Ulster County, New York, which bought them in 1979 from the bankruptcy estate of the Penn Central Railroad. The railroad's current permit with Ulster County expires on December 31, 2028.

The CMRR is employee-owned with over 60 stockholders who are current or former employees. No single stockholder owns more than 18% of the CMRR. All operating profits have been reinvested in the CMRR's equipment and Ulster County's track since the railroad was founded in 1983.

== Operations ==
CMRR operates on a 4.7-mile (7.6 km) section of track of the former Ulster and Delaware Railroad from Kingston to Stony Hollow, New York. CMRR's Kingston station is at Westbrook Lane, near the Kingston Plaza Shopping Center, and ends just east of the New York State Route 28A (NY 28A) crossing in Stony Hollow, New York. The station is a short walk from the Kingston Stockade District along Westbrook Lane or from Midtown Kingston along the Kingston Midtown Linear Park.

CMRR operates a variety of themed trains as of 2025. The season begins with the Easter Bunny Express in the spring, with regular runs until Christmas of each year. In the summer, CMRR runs its Catskill Mountain Flyer, Dinosaur Express, Twilight Limited and Ice Cream Sundays Train, and in the fall, Fall Foliage and Pumpkin Express trains. From Thanksgiving to Christmas it runs Polar Express trains.

Trains are powered by Alco RS-1 401 (ex-GMRC 401), and consist of six flatcars converted to passenger use; a refurbished caboose 675 (ex-PRR 477672); five ex-LIRR P72 coaches and former Norfolk and Western PM coach 1727.

Ulster County leaders are reviewing a railroad proposal to extend the line from Stony Hollow (MP 8.33) to the current end of track at Basin Road (MP 10.01) to facilitate a western station and event center at this location. This would enable regular shuttle service to the Ashokan Rail Trail, which continues along the former U&D right-of-way west of Basin Road, in addition to the current themed services. In May 2024, Ulster County approved the reactivation of a committee to review this proposal:

== Sustainability ==
=== Biodiesel ===
In March 2024 the CMRR started using 100% biodiesel in both of its locomotives in Kingston to reduce emissions.

=== Clean Diesel Locomotive ===
In March 2024, the New York State Department of Transportation awarded the CMRR a $2.3 million New York State Passenger and Freight Rail grant for a clean diesel upgrade to at least EPA Tier 3 locomotive for one of its existing locomotives.

== Ridership ==
Ridership levels have varied with service changes and the 2016 termination of service from Phoenicia. The CMRR saw record ridership in 2023 and then again in 2024.

Year	Kingston			Phoenicia	Total
	General	Polar Express / Christmas	Subtotal		
2008	N/A	884	884	7,155	8,039
2009	594	952	1,546	6,767	8,313
2010	1,006	1,038	2,044	10,211	12,255
2011	1,375	1,243	2,618	6,684	9,302
2012	1,699	1,366	3,065	8,463	11,528
2013	2,804	1,771	4,575	10,248	14,823
2014	14,888	16,401	31,289	8,981	40,270
2015	6,014	21,216	27,230	12,129	39,359
2016	4,952	24,196	29,148	9,595	38,743
2017	12,290	24,223	36,513	N/A	36,513
2018	10,988	1,791	37,619	N/A	37,619
2019	11,483	29,632	41,115	N/A	41,115
2020	11,216	1,791	13,007	N/A	13,007
2021	18,991	4,761	23,752	N/A	23,752
2022	17,900	28,845	46,745	N/A	46,745
2023	20,021	31,589	51,610	N/A	51,610
2024	26,481	34,172	60,563	N/A	60,653
2025	25,481	36,196	61,677	N/A	61,677

Over 80% of passengers in 2024 were from outside Ulster County, with 21% of riders from New York City and Long Island.

== History ==
=== Catskill Mountain Railroad ===
In 1973, the Catskill Mountain Transportation Corp. "CMCT" was formed with the goal of purchasing the former Ulster and Delaware Railroad for freight and passenger service.

On October 2, 1976, freight service ceased on the Catskill Mountain Branch.

In 1979, Ulster County purchased the portion of the former Ulster and Delaware Railroad from MP 2.9 to MP 41.4, a total of 38.6 miles (62.1 km), for $1.5 million, with the goal of resuming freight service and initiating a tourist train. The line had ceased passenger operations on March 31, 1954, and freight operations on October 2, 1976.

In 1980 and 1981, members of the Kingston Model Railroad club cleared brush on the line.

In 1982 members of the CMCT and the Kingston Model Railroad club formed the Catskill Mountain Railroad "CMRR", with the purpose of operating freight and passenger service on the former Ulster and Delaware Railroad from Kingston to Highmount, NY, a total of 38.6 miles of track.

In 1982, Ulster County leased its entire 38.6-mile (62.1 km) portion of the line to the CMRR. On August 9, 1982, CMRR initially began operations in Phoenicia, using track cars and trailers to haul tourists and tubers three miles along Esopus Creek to Mt. Pleasant station. The railroad was incorporated on March 7, 1983, as a railroad corporation in the state of New York. William Haysom was its first President.

In 1985, the CMRR began running full-sized equipment consisting of CMRR No.1, "The Duck", a flat car and caboose. Earl Pardini became president to help guide them through the transition. Pardini was with the D&U at its startup, helping to train its engineers and conductors. He agreed to come aboard, and the CMRR embarked on a period of serious expansion. Pardini had been a member of the former CMCT, and was brakeman on the last freight train on October 2, 1976.

In 1986, Ulster County reconnected the line with Conrail at Kingston. The railroad purchased a variety of second-hand locomotives, coaches and freight cars which were shipped by rail to Kingston. Some of the equipment was refurbished and used immediately, while the rest sat in storage until needed. Also in 1986, the CMRR signed its first multi-year lease with Ulster County, for five years, and began switching freight for the Kingston Recycling Center as well as operating tourist train service from Phoenicia to Mt. Tremper, New York.

In 1987, a devastating flood washed out Campground Curve, between Phoenicia and Mt. Tremper. In conjunction with NYSDOT and Ulster County, this damage was repaired and service restored in 1988. Operations focused on Phoenicia to Mt. Tremper, with limited operations in Kingston.

=== Expansion and Setbacks 1991-2005 ===
The railroad entered into a 25-year lease with Ulster County in 1991. Railroad operations ended at busy Route 28 in Mt. Pleasant. The crossing had been out of service for many years, and the railroad needed to replace it if it was to continue east toward Kingston. The project received approval and after about ten years, public funding was provided to complete reconstruction of the crossing and installation of warning lights and gates. The new crossing was put into service in October 2004, offering the railroad its first significant expansion.

Then tragedy struck CMRR. On April 1, 2005, a devastating flood nearly wiped out the railroad, and caused much damage to the tracks and equipment in Phoenicia. After several weeks of volunteer effort, the line was reopened in summer 2005. Around this time, interest increased in using some segments of the rail corridor in Ulster County for a recreational trail.

=== Volunteer Resurgence ===
During the winter of 2006, the railroad reorganized its efforts as new volunteers came forward. A group from the nearby Ulster & Delaware Railroad Historical Society were among the first to offer assistance. Brush-cutting and clearing the right of way took first priority. A high-profile activity with immediate results, the cleanup effort motivated more volunteers to join. By the end of 2006, the volunteer force had increased to 45 full members and 30 provisional members. They cleared nearly 20 miles of brush from the mainline.

=== Kingston Operations Resume ===
In 2007 the railroad began track repairs in Kingston in line with the "ski lift" concept recommended in the ALTA Engineering study for railroad operation from Kingston to West Hurley. The railroad restored tracks in Kingston, with service opening to Washington Avenue in December 2008. In late 2009, the railroad opened more track west of Washington Avenue and offered additional seasonal service throughout that year. From 2007 to 2009, close to two miles of track had been rebuilt in Kingston, from Cornell Street to the foot of Bridge C9.

For three years, the CMRR worked to complete the rehabilitation of Bridge C9 over Esopus Creek in Kingston. The bridge was opened for service on December 7, 2012, enabling track rehabilitation westward with Route 209 being the first destination. Route 209, MP 5.42, was reached on September 21, 2013, and MP 6.16, was reached on November 16, 2014. MP 6.45 was reached in November 2015 and MP 8.33 was reached in Stony Hollow in September, 2019. The first passenger train to Route 209 ran on October 19, 2013, and the first to Hurley Mountain Road on November 21, 2014.

=== West End Expansion ===
Through 2007 and 2008, work also continued on opening the .6 mile Cold Brook Extension. The first train arrived at Cold Brook Station on July 4, 2008: the first regularly scheduled passenger train to arrive at the station since March 31, 1954. Because Cold Brook station remains privately owned, the railroad maintained no agency there and there are no facilities to board or discharge passengers. In 2009, the CMRR repaired track another .8 miles to the Boiceville Bridge at MP 21.3, for work trains only.

By 2010, the physical limit of track restoration was reached on the "western" end of the operable railroad. To the west of Bridge Street in Phoenicia is a major washout preventing any serious restoration work without outside funding. To the east, the railroad rebuilt tracks up to the limit of Bridge C30 (Boiceville Trestle). This was a total of 6.4 miles of operable track at its greatest extent.

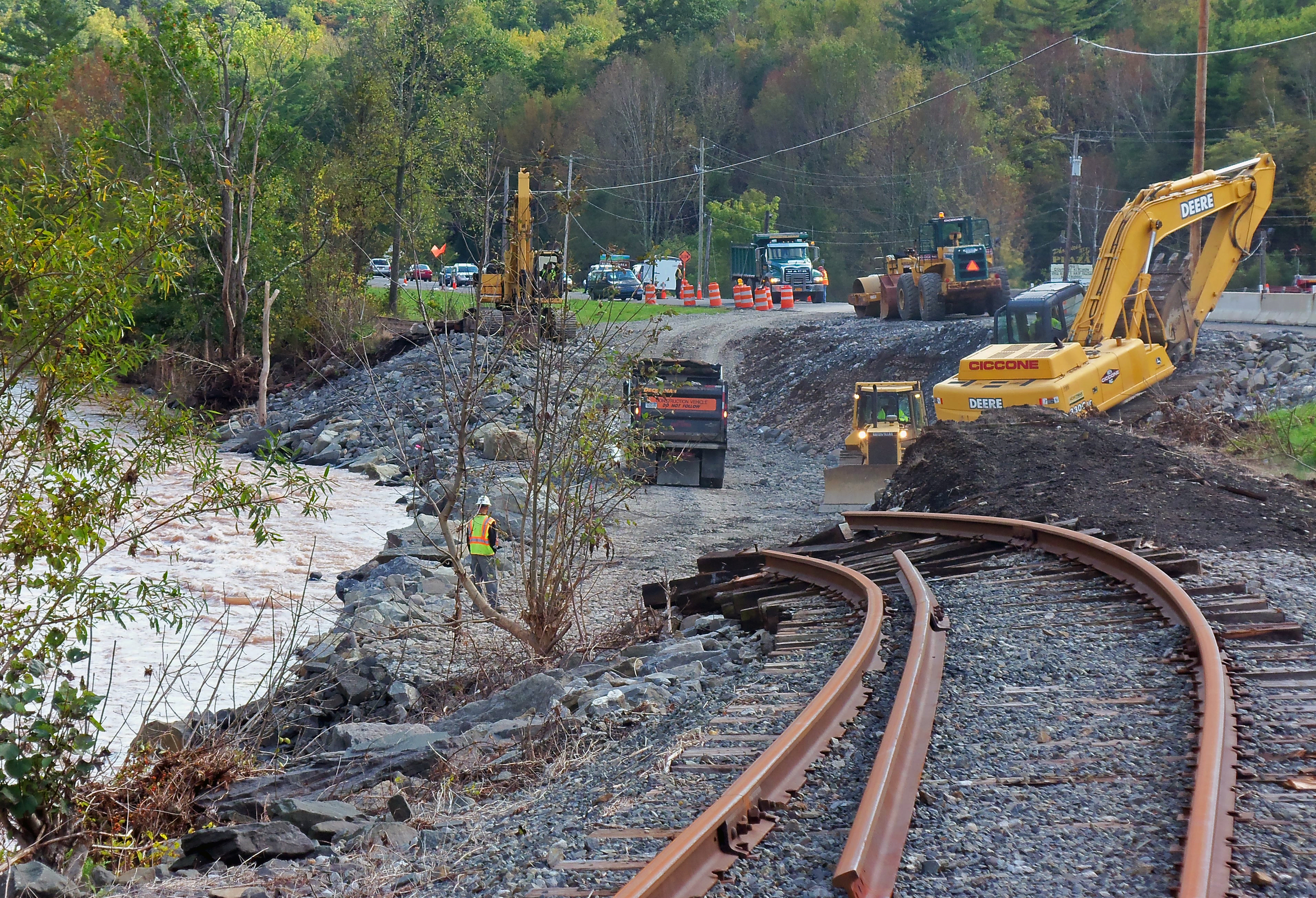
Tracks being repaired after damage from Hurricane Irene

=== Hurricane Irene ===
On August 28, 2011, CMRR was devastated by flooding as a result of Hurricane Irene. Flood waters inundated the yard at Phoenicia, scouring the right of way and threatening the depot. A significant washout occurred at Campground Curve, similar to the one in 1987. All operating equipment had been moved to safe ground at Mt. Tremper, east of Campground Curve. Additional damage had been incurred where damage from a previous washout was already underway. In the non-operating segment east of Cold Brook station, the most significant damage was the loss of three of the four spans of Boiceville Trestle (Bridge C30) to rising flood waters. There was no significant damage to the restored tracks in the Kingston area.

The CMRR resumed operations on September 10, 2011, on a shortened length of track near Mount Tremper. The washout at Campground Curve was repaired in late 2011, except for reinstallation of track. Operations west of Mt. Tremper commenced on August 5, 2012. In November 2012, the County informed the CMRR that several repair projects had been approved by FEMA. Seven projects, including restoration of the Boiceville Trestle, were approved for $2.3 million. However, the County informed CMRR that it would not begin the projects unless CMRR agreed to terminate its lease from Kingston to the Ashokan Reservoir.

On August 3, 2013, the CMRR started reconstruction work of track on Campground Curve as part of returning to Phoenicia. This was done assuming that the county would not initiate a FEMA-funded project for this repair. The CMRR completed repairs to Phoenicia on August 7, 2015. Ironically, these repairs made possible the future new railbiking use for this segment of the railroad.

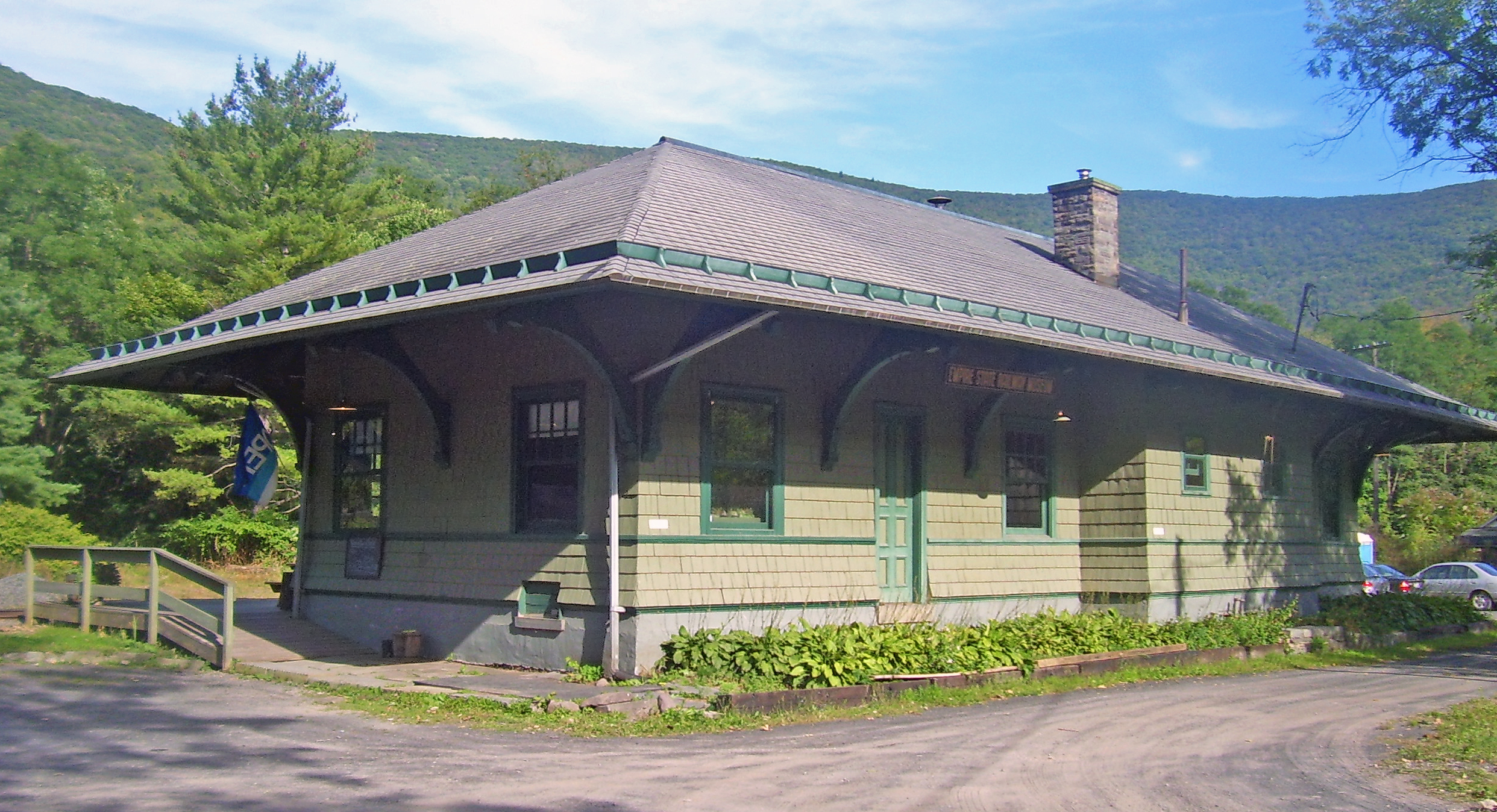
Phoenicia Station, site of the Empire State Railway Museum

At the end of its 25-year lease with Ulster County on May 31, 2016, the CMRR ran from Phoenicia at MP 27.5 to the washout at MP 23.3, as the FEMA funds were never released for the trestle and washout repairs.

=== Litigation with Ulster County ===
In 2013, Ulster County attempted to terminate the CMRR's lease three years before its expiration. The CMRR successfully litigated the attempt to terminate its lease at a cost of $700,000. The litigation was settled in April 2016, and the CMRR was allowed to continue its former lease through its natural expiration on May 31, 2016.

=== Permit Extensions and Growth ===
In August 2016, the CMRR signed a new permit with Ulster County for a five-mile segment from MP 3.6 at Chandler Drive in Kingston to MP 8.3 in Stony Hollow. It was extended on a short-term basis until 2023 when it was subsequently renewed to December 31, 2028.

Before its lease expired in 2016, the line was reopened for work trains to MP 11 on the Glenford Dike at the Ashokan Reservoir. The track from MP 10 to MP 11 was removed in 2018 for the Ashokan Rail Trail.

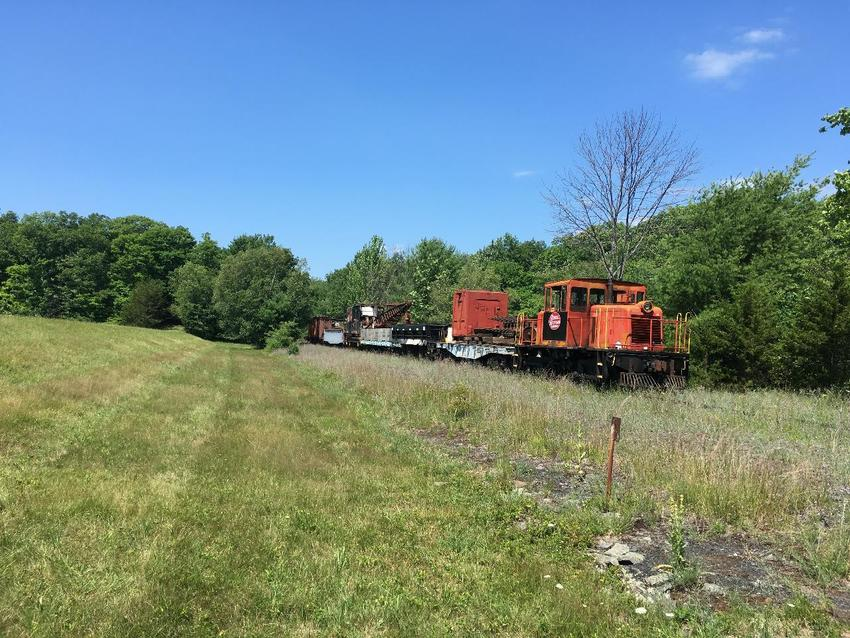
CMRR's work train leaves the Woodstock Dike on July 22, 2016

In 2023, the CMRR signed a lease with the owner of a 5-acre parcel at Basin Road for the purpose of building a permanent terminal there. The CMRR lease included 1000 feet of track from MP 9.8 to MP 10.01, and the right to build a trail parallel to the tracks on this property.

Also in 2023, the CMRR signed a Letter of Intent and later a lease for a property adjacent to its permit area for a permanent equipment storage and maintenance yard.

- CMRR Inspection Train to Glenford Dike April 24, 2016

== Operating history ==
=== Kingston-West Hurley ===
Since November 2006, the CMRR has re-opened track in Kingston. The passenger operable section stretches from Chandler Drive at MP 3.6 to Stony Hollow at MP 8.3.

On December 6, 2008, the railroad inaugurated seasonal tourist runs between Downs Street (MP 3.2) and Washington Avenue (MP 4.37). A small ticket office and loading platform was constructed off Westbrook Lane (MP 3.78) opposite Kingston Plaza to support tourist operations in 2008. The critical Washington Avenue crossing was reopened for limited use in 2008, and the track was opened to Bridge C-9 (MP 5) on November 15, 2009, for the 2009 Kingston Holiday Train. Repairs to Bridge C9 started in September 2011, and were completed on December 3, 2012. The bridge was certified on December 7, 2012, and the first passenger train ran across the bridge on December 8. On September 21, 2013, CMRR workers completed track rehabilitation up to NYS Route 209 (MP 5.42). The next day, work began on the next extension past 209 to Hurley Mountain Road (MP 5.94). In late 2014 track was expanded to MP 6.13, and in late 2015 to MP 6.45, over 1/2 mile west of Hurley Mountain Road. The operable section was extended to MP 6.67 in 2018 and to MP 8.33 in Stony Hollow in 2019.

CMRR also had a yard in Kingston, referred to as "Cornell Street Yard." In 2009, a new siding was constructed to expand the yard facilities to allow for the storage and restoration of passenger cars for expanded tourist train operations. The CMRR was forced to vacate the yard by the County on May 1, 2016.

=== Phoenicia-Cold Brook ===
The CMRR operated a tourist excursion train from Phoenicia Railroad Station, Phoenicia, MP 27.5 to Cold Brook Railroad Station, MP 22.1 until October 31, 2016. Its trains originated from the former U&D station in Phoenicia, which is also home to the Empire State Railway Museum. Passengers boarded trains at Phoenicia or Mount Tremper Railroad Station, MP 25.2.

Initially, service was provided by track cars hauling trailers between Phoenicia and Mount Tremper. Realizing that the future lies in conventional railroad equipment hauled by locomotives, two flatcars were rebuilt as open air bench cars to accommodate passengers. A Porter 50-ton switcher was enlisted to haul the expanded consist. A 1922-vintage wooden caboose often (ex-D&H 35952) brought up the rear, and offered additional capacity.

In early 2004 the caboose was taken out of service and replaced with a restored coach of Lackawanna heritage. This coach greatly increased the capacity of each train, and also helped offer "all-weather" service. In late 2004, service was extended to MP 22.7. It was extended further to Cold Brook Station, MP 22.1, on July 4, 2008.

On May 6, 2010, Phoenicia operations acquired a new locomotive, former LIRR/SIRY Alco S1 407, which was placed in service on May 7, 2010. It was the workhorse engine for Phoenicia operations since the start of the 2010 season. A second coach was put into service on October 2, 2010, just in time for the Fall Foliage trains.

In 2011, construction of a new switch and siding began at MP 24.75, to park maintenance equipment and give the work train a place to alight. It was completed on May 25, 2012.

For the 2012 season, the train ran initially from Mt. Tremper west to MP 23.3 where subgrade repairs are necessary due to Hurricane Irene. On August 5, 2012, after repairs were made at MP 25.5, the passenger train began running west to the next damaged section at MP 25.8, one half mile west of Mt. Tremper. On August 6, 2015, service was restored to Phoenicia Station after extensive track repairs were completed by the CMRR.

Work trains generally consisted of transfer caboose 697 (ex-CR 18015) and "The Duck," a small Davenport switcher. Equipment restoration and maintenance takes place at the railroad's open-air facilities. The original Phoenicia section house is used by the railroad to store tools and supplies for the track crew.

On August 4, 2016, CMRR was granted a permit to resume operations on this segment of the U&D Corridor through October 31, 2016. However, the county has elected to use a rail bike (www.railexplorers.net) company as the operator for this segment starting in 2017. The CMRR moved all its equipment to its adjacent property in Phoenicia in January, 2017.

In May, 2017 Rail Explorers announced it would not be operating on the western section of the line in 2017; however, it opened for operations in 2018.

=== Shokan ===
Under its prior lease, the CMRR's third base of operations was at MP 16.4 at Shokan, New York, at the site of the former Ashokan Railroad Station. The operating equipment there consisted of a self-powered crane, flat car, and an ex-Susquehanna caboose (privately owned). Shokan also served as a base for the CMRR's track car crews, who were charged with maintenance of the section of the line inaccessible to full-sized equipment, from MP 11 to bridge C30 at MP 21.3. The CMRR removed all its equipment in Shokan by rail on July 21, 2016. All tracks at Shokan were removed in 2018 to make way for the Ashokan Rail Trail.

== Other segments ==
=== Phoenicia Station to Bridge Street (MP 27.5 to 27.85) ===
These tracks are currently leased to the Empire State Railway Museum. The CMRR hopes to eventually share this trackage with the ESRM in Phoenicia.

=== Boiceville-Phoenicia Station (MP 21.59 to 27.5) ===
The tracks from Boiceville to Phoenicia have been left in place and are leased to Rail Explorers, a rail-bike tourism company. The CMRR continues to store rail equipment on its land opposite the Phoenicia Station. This segment is divided by a severe washout at MP 23.3 from Hurricane Irene in 2011, that prohibits rail service (rail bikes or trains) from MP 21.59 to MP 23.3. It is hoped that once the washout is repaired at MP 23.3 rail operations can be extended to the new trailhead for the Ashokan Rail Trail at Boiceville to allow rail passengers to continue on the trail.

=== Kingston-Phoenicia (MP 2.9 to 27.85) ===
The CMRR's former long-term goal was to run tourist trains on the entire 25-mile run from Kingston to Phoenicia. The goal was negated on November 14, 2017, when the Ulster County legislature voted to remove 11.6 miles of tracks from alongside Ashokan Reservoir for a rail trail. The tracks from MP 10.01 to MP 21.59 were removed in 2018.

=== West of Phoenicia (MP 27.85 to 41.4) ===
The CMRR has never had plans to reopen this section of the line to service. However, the neighboring DURR in Delaware County has expressed interest in resuming service possibly all the way to Big Indian (MP 36.4). It currently leases a run-around from Ulster County from MP 41.2 to 41.4.

Ulster County leaders plan to convert the tracks from MP 36.4 at Big Indian to MP 41.4 to trail use, leaving a runaround in place from MP 41.2 to 41.4 for use by the Delaware and Ulster Railroad.{{cn}}

== 2020s proposed expansion ==
=== Basin Road Station ===
As of 2024, CMRR operates service from Kington to MP 8.33 in Stony Hollow with plans to extend train service to Basin Road at MP 10.01 at the border of the NYCDEP easement. The tracks from MP 8.33 to MP 10.01 remain in place and CMRR is requesting permission to renovate and operate on this segment with a proposed terminal at MP 9.95 near Basin Road.

This proposed terminal could also be used by Ashokan Rail Trail (ART) users through access just west of MP 10.01. Proposed uses are: • ART information • Ulster County tourism information • Public indoor bathrooms • Commercial retail space (food and drink, bicycle repair and rental, or other convenience uses) • Covered area for events related to the ART and CMRR • A ticket office for CMRR. • A "north pole" for the Polar Express.

In March 2024, the New York State Department of Transportation awarded the CMRR a New York State Passenger and Freight Rail grant for $667,000 to develop a terminal at Basin Road adjacent to the Ashokan Rail Trail. It was suspended a year later after the Albany Times-Union discovered that the county had not signed off on the grant as the law required.

=== Secure storage yard and engine house ===
CMRR has lacked a secure area to maintain its equipment since a legal settlement with Ulster County forced it to vacate the Cornell Street yard on April 30, 2016, and its directors believe that an all-weather engine house is needed to maintain its equipment year-round, and has identified a location adjacent to its permit area in Kingston to be used for this purpose.

In March 2024, the New York State Department of Transportation awarded the CMRR a $1.5 million New York State Passenger and Freight Rail grant for an all-weather maintenance facility with connecting track.

=== Proposed track additions ===
CMRR operates 4.7 miles of single track with a single siding in Kingston, making operations and switching quite difficult. CMRR plans to install a run-around siding in Kingston and near the new Basin Road terminal to allow engine-first operation on the entire line.

== Roster of equipment ==
=== Locomotives ===
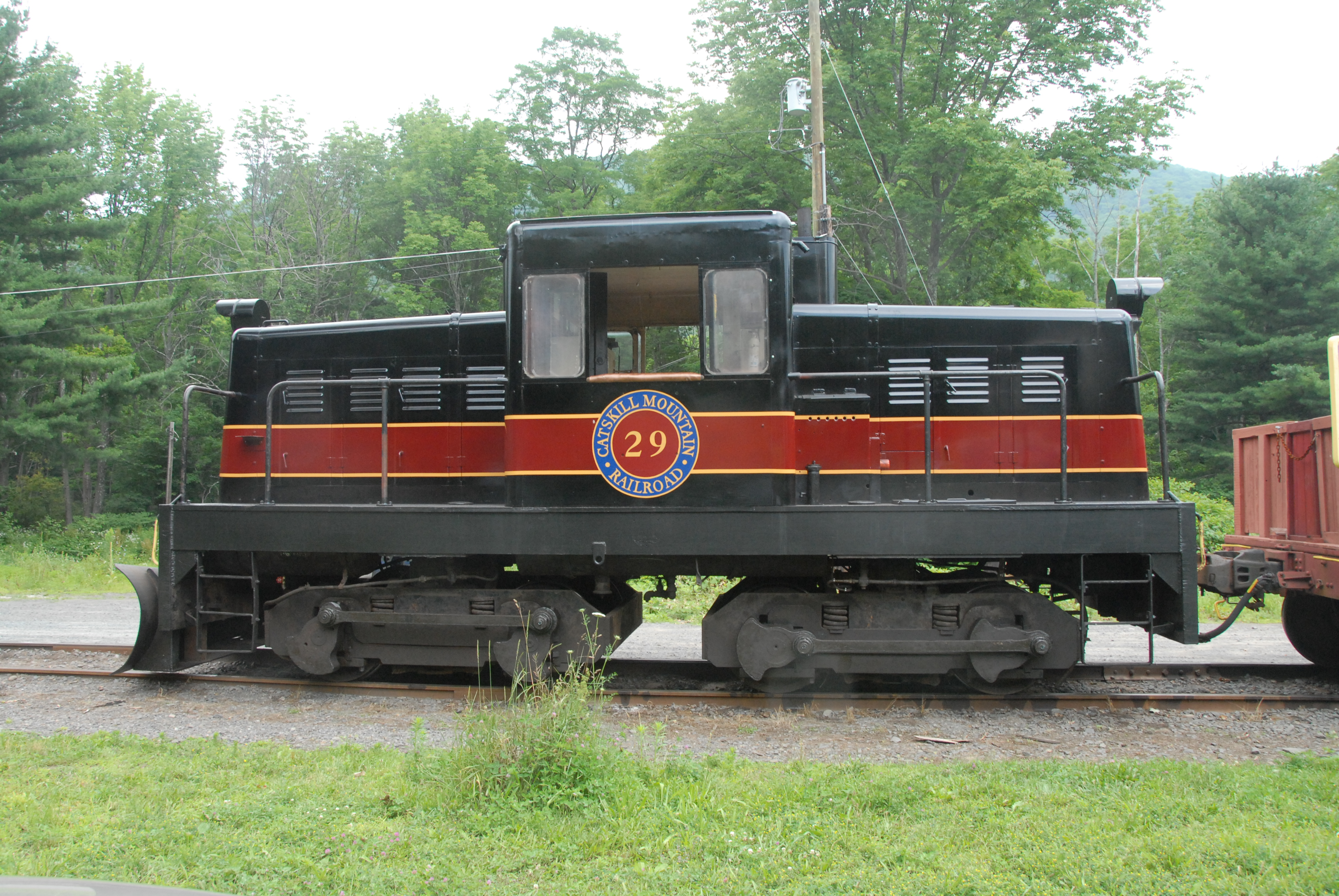
No. 29

CMRR owns two American Locomotive Company (ALCO) RS-1 locomotives, No. 401 (Ex-Green Mountain Railroad (GMRC) No. 401, Ex Gulf, Mobile and Ohio Railroad (GM&O) No. 1052, Ex Illinois Terminal Railroad No. 1056, née 756); and No. 2361 (former Alter Scrap No. 2361, Ex-Soo Line Railroad (SOO) 2361). Only 401 is operational at this time. In 2010, 2361 was repainted and evaluated for reactivation; it was given a new number, 400. In early 2026, 400 was lit on fire by a vandal and sustained major damage.

In May 2010, the CMRR acquired its latest locomotive, former Long Island Railroad/Staten Island Railway Alco S-1 407. This engine was the workhorse for operations out of Mt. Tremper and Phoenicia, but now remains in storage.

CMRR No. 29, "The Goat" is an Ex-Navy 50 ton H. K. Porter, Inc locomotive, which was a backup engine and main engine for work train service. It has a double-reduction gearing system in the trucks. The traction motors are mounted at 90 degrees to the axles and have bevel pinions on the armature shafts. These bevel pinions drive a larger bevel ring gear in a gear case. On one truck, the locking nut on the traction motor armature shaft came loose, and the bevel pinion jammed in the ring gear, locking up the truck. The bevel pinion jammed against the ring gear and bent it. #29 is currently for sale and remains in storage in Phoenicia.

CMRR No. 1, the "Duck", another work train locomotive, is an Ex-Army 38 ton Davenport Locomotive Works locomotive. The "Duck" is operational and is located currently in Phoenicia and is being used by the Empire State Railway Museum for switching.

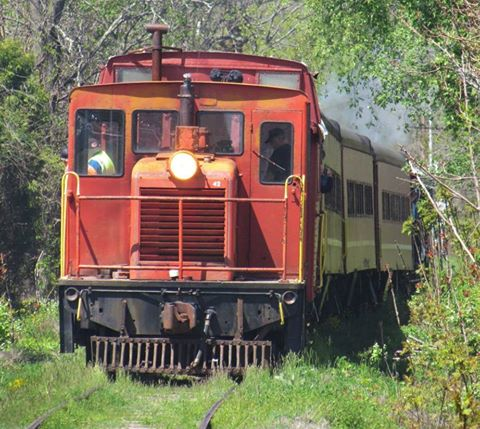
No. 42

In 2014, the CMRR acquired a 1942 GE 45-tonner, numbered 42, from the Railroad Museum of New England. The locomotive is currently located in Kingston and is used for work train service.

The CMRR also attempted to partner with the ESRM restore a steam locomotive for future use on their line: Ex-Lake Superior and Ishpeming (LS&I) 2-8-0 No. 23, which has been owned by the ESRM since it was sold at an auction in 1985 by the defunct Marquette and Huron Mountain Railroad in Michigan. The restoration project has been going on since it was first announced in February 1998, but it has been relegated to a cosmetic restoration.

=== Passenger equipment ===
Kingston passenger equipment consists of five flat cars, including two Ex-Navy 50-foot flatcars, No. 271 and 272 (ex-Navy 21028 and 21035), two Ex-Army 50-foot flatcars, No. 273 and 274 (ex-Army No. 35111 and 35112), and one 40-foot flat, CMRR No. 278 (ex-Lowville & Beaver River No. 26). All have been converted to open-air passenger service with the addition of side walls, benches, and a steel canopy frame suitable for tarp installation.

In 2021, 40 foot flat 291 (Ex-Army 35305) was converted from a crane tender to passenger use with benches and a canopy roof. With this conversion, the CMRR has six passenger flats available for service in Kingston.

The CMRR has five operable coaches in Kingston: four former Long Island Railroad commuter coaches, CMRR 2940, 2949, 2962, and 2911, The CMRR also owns Ontario Northern 832 (former Norfolk & Western PM coach No. 1727) and is renovating the car for first class service. A sixth coach, ex-LIRR No. 2918, is undergoing restoration.

The CMRR also uses an N5B Caboose, CMRR No. 675 (Ex-PRR 477672, PC 22800, CR 20003) on Kingston passenger trains for crew use.

Phoenicia passenger equipment consists of two former Erie Lackawanna Railway (EL) Multiple unit (MU) trailers that have been completely renovated: No. 4321 entered service as CMRR No. 701 in 2004, and No. 4332 entered service on October 2, 2010, as CMRR No. 702. Another third MU trailer, No. 4322, is undergoing restoration back to active service. It will most likely be numbered as CMRR No. 703 upon completion.

=== Other equipment ===
CMRR also rosters several pieces of freight equipment used in storage and work train service.

In Kingston, storage equipment includes two 50-foot boxcars, former D&H 26076 and former NYC 72462. Work train equipment includes: an ex-Army Difco dump car, a 40-foot flat car (CMRR 201 (Ex LBR No. 27)), a ballast hopper (former NYC No. 51467), a gondola (former PRR No. 518399) and a privately owned caboose CMRR 674 (ex-Susquehanna 117).

Additionally in Kingston the CMRR owns a self-powered ex-Navy crane, CMRR 991, and a 40-foot tender flat CMRR 291 (ex-Army 35305).

In Phoenicia, storage equipment consists of a 40-foot box car (Ex-LV 65100). Work Train equipment includes: a former Army Difco dump car, a 40-foot flatcar, CMRR 202 (Ex-CV 7704) and an N6A transfer caboose, CMRR 697 (Ex NYC/PC/CR 18015).

Phoenicia equipment also includes a privately owned N5G steel caboose, CMRR 673 (former Lehigh Valley 95041). This caboose was used as a gift shop at Mt. Tremper for many years before it was returned to the rails in 2010.

The frame and trucks of former LS&I caboose No. 6, which were bought by a CMRR volunteer in the 1980s, are in storage in Phoenicia.

== Ashokan Rail Trail conversion history ==
The removal of rail and conversion to trail for the CMRR's portion of the U&D Corridor from MP 10.01 to MP 21.59 for the Ashokan Rail Trail was a long and bitter fight between rail and trail advocates. A partial history follows below.

On January 24, 2006, when the Kingston Daily Freeman announced "Trail Plan Could Mark End of Line for Railroad", trail advocates began promoting a plan to convert segments of the county-owned railroad corridor into a recreational path, which would limit the length and location of the tourist train excursions. ALTA Engineering was hired to devise a rail-with-trail plan for the line in Ulster County. The final report stated the following:

The future vision of the Ulster & Delaware Rail + Trail is a significant opportunity for local communities, Ulster County, and the region. The combination of two historic tourist railroads, the trolley and railroad museums, restored historic sites, and a trail for multiple uses will complement the tourism and recreation economy of the Catskill Mountain Region. The project can become a model of sustainable transportation and cooperation between a wide range of public, private, and nonprofit partners.

On October 4, 2012, Ulster County Executive Michael P. Hein announced in his 2013 budget a plan to remove 32 miles of rails in Ulster County to be replaced by a trail, leaving the Phoenicia-Cold Brook segment, and ending Kingston operations. He planned to start removing rails in 2013, using $642,000 in scrapping revenues to provide revenue for his budget. The budget was adopted by the Ulster County Legislature on December 4, 2012. The CMRR's lease, however, remained in effect until May 31, 2016. There is no reference to scrapping the railroad in the proposed 2014 Ulster County Budget.

Three days after the 2013 budget was approved, the CMRR opened Bridge C9 in Kingston for passenger train service, and began bringing passengers across the bridge for the first time in over 58 years.

On February 19, 2013, CMRR published a rail-with-trail study for MP 3 to 11 in response to a request from the county made on October 15, 2012. The rail-with-trail plan was rejected without review by the county on March 7, 2013.

On June 5, 2013, Ulster County hired Andrea C. Ferster, Esq, who was also general counsel to the Rails to Trails Conservancy, to file an application to the Surface Transportation Board (STB) to "rail bank" the railroad for future trail use.

On June 12, 2013, CMRR was served with a Notice to Cure. In a meeting with the Ulster County Executive, held on June 24, 2013, the CMRR was asked to vacate the line from Kingston to the Ashokan Reservoir, and told that unless it complied, its lease would be terminated on July 12. CMRR filed a Yellowstone Injunction on July 9 and was granted a TRO prohibiting the county from terminating the lease pending the outcome of a court decision on August 6. The Yellowstone Injunction was granted on November 6, 2013. Ulster County issued a notice of appeal on December 17, 2013.

On December 11, 2013, the outgoing New York City DEP commissioner announced a plan to support a trail along the U&D right of way from MP 10 to MP 21.6.

On December 8, 2014, the Ulster county executive announced that, assuming certain requirements were met, a little more than two miles of tourist passenger train service could remain in Kingston, from the eastern end of Kingston Plaza, MP 3.6, to Hurley Mountain Road, MP 5.94.

On April 19, 2015, the Ulster County legislature passed a resolution to create a nine-member legislator-only committee to study the entire U&D corridor in Ulster County and make recommendations on long-term use, including rail, trail or rail with trail with recommendations due by November 30, 2015.

On May 15, 2015, the Ulster County legislature passed a resolution to sign a memorandum of agreement with the New York City Department of Environmental Protection to begin spending planning dollars on a future conversion of the 11.5 mile railroad easement owned by the county in the Ashokan Reservoir to trail use.

On December 15, 2015, Stone Consulting completed a report on the highest and best uses of the U&D corridor.

On December 15, 2015, the Ulster County legislature passed a resolution making rail-with-trail the official policy from Chandler Drive (MP 3.58) in Kingston to just past 28a in Stony Hollow (MP 8.33), allowing the railroad to continue operations in Kingston and for 4.75 miles west. The segment from 28a to MP 10 will be studied further "provided that trail connectivity co-located on the corridor shall be preserved". This gives the CMRR a potential long-term home in Kingston and could allow the railroad to expand west as far as MP 10. It also confirmed that rail will remain from the Route 28A bridge in Boiceville (MP 21.6) to Phoenicia (MP 27.9). Any further rail expansion along the north side of the Ashokan Reservoir would be dependent on consent from the NYCDEP and the Ulster County legislature. The Stone Consulting report found there were no physical restrictions to rail alongside trail from MP 10 to 11, with the only restriction to rail use being imposed by the agreement between Ulster County and NYCDEP. This resolution effectively ended the fight on rail vs. trail on the former U&D corridor, with rail and trail proponents pledging to work together.

On April 19, 2016, the county and the CMRR settled their lawsuit contingent on the CMRR vacating its yard at Cornell Street in Kingston on May 1, 2016, ceasing operations on May 31, 2016 (the end of its lease term), and removing its equipment from the railroad by July 30, 2016. The litigation cost the CMRR $700,000, but allowed the railroad to operate to the end of its lease with Ulster County on May 31, 2016.

On July 18, 2016, the Ulster county executive announced that permits had been signed for the CMRR to continue operating in Kingston from MP 3.6 to 8.33 until December 31, 2020, and from MP 23.3 to 27.8 until October 31, 2016. The permits were issued on August 4, 2016, and service resumed on August 6, 2016.

On December 14, 2017, the Ulster County legislature voted to remove all railroad tracks from MP 10.01 to MP 21.59, permanently severing the U&D corridor and eliminating the CMRR's plans to return to the Glenford Dike and Phoenicia with full-service passenger operations.

In July 2018, a state Supreme Court justice dismissed a claim against Ulster County over its plan to create a recreational trail along portions of the former Ulster & Delaware Railroad corridor. Ulster County removed 11.6 miles of track along Ashokan Reservoir in 2018, and is building a new rail trail there. This development should permanently foreclose any affordable restoration of through passenger train service from Kingston to a connection with the DURR at Highmount, and on to Roxbury.

In late 2018, rail removal began between milepost 10.01 and 21.59, severing the railroad line from Kingston to Phoenicia. This section was opened as the Ashokan Rail Trail in October 2019.

=== Fate of remaining track mileage ===
As of 2026 the county has not designated a use for the 1.7-mile (2.7 km) segment of the U&D corridor from the rail trail's current end at the Basin Road overpass to the intersection of the tracks with New York State Route 28A at Stony Hollow. Trail advocates would like that segment to be trail-only so that could better be connected to the Empire State Trail network planned to run parallel to the Hudson River through Kingston; the track would have to be widened for rail and trail. This, they say, cannot be done at a reasonable cost given the federally protected wetlands adjacent to part of the segment.

The CMRR has disputed this, arguing that if a boardwalk similar to the one already used by the rail trail were built in the wetlands area, there would be minimal additional cost. According to the railroad, Stony Hollow is a poor location for its terminal. Walkers seeking the views from the two dikes will drive to the West Hurley trailhead rather than climb the 2% grade on the segment. In 2025 the CMRR received a state grant to build a terminal complex on land it leases at Basin Road; it was later suspended after it was discovered the county had indicated its support of the project. The dispute between the two sides has become rancorous, with accusations of bad faith and subterfuge; the CMRR says it has had equipment vandalized on several occasions.

In April 2025 the state grant the railroad received to build the new terminal facility at Basin Road was suspended after it was discovered that the county had not cosigned the application as required. The railroad said that the county had not responded to a letter asking them to cosign, which was interpreted as indicating the county had no objections. But the county's planning director said it would never have approved it as the CMRR was applying for use of a section of track it did not have a permit for.

Local government meetings on the issue grew contentious. "I've never seen an issue divide the town that much," said Hurley's town supervisor, of a meeting where the town board considered whether to take a position. "I could see blood vessels popping out of people's heads." The Woodstock Land Conservancy received a threat of violence, resulting in increased security at its offices and a later meeting in the town. Later death threats were reported against the railroad's management.

The county legislature's U&D Corridor Advisory Committee decided late in 2025 to commission another study of the issue. But the next month another issue arose when the legislature's Housing and Transportation Committee brought up a resolution to remove the Basin Road bridge in order to facilitate New York City's Ashokan Century plan to upgrade the reservoir and its facilities. It is currently 19 inches (48 cm) too low for construction vehicles to pass below it, and without Basin Road the city says all its trucks will have to go around the Boiceville end of the reservoir. The railroad alleged that the county's real goal in removing the bridge was to undercut its plans to develop the West Hurley station by cutting off access to the rail trail's current eastern terminus, with perhaps the eventual idea of converting the entire rail corridor into a trail. It offered instead to have the bridge raised at its expense. The resolution was amended and the vote was postponed.

== Photo gallery ==
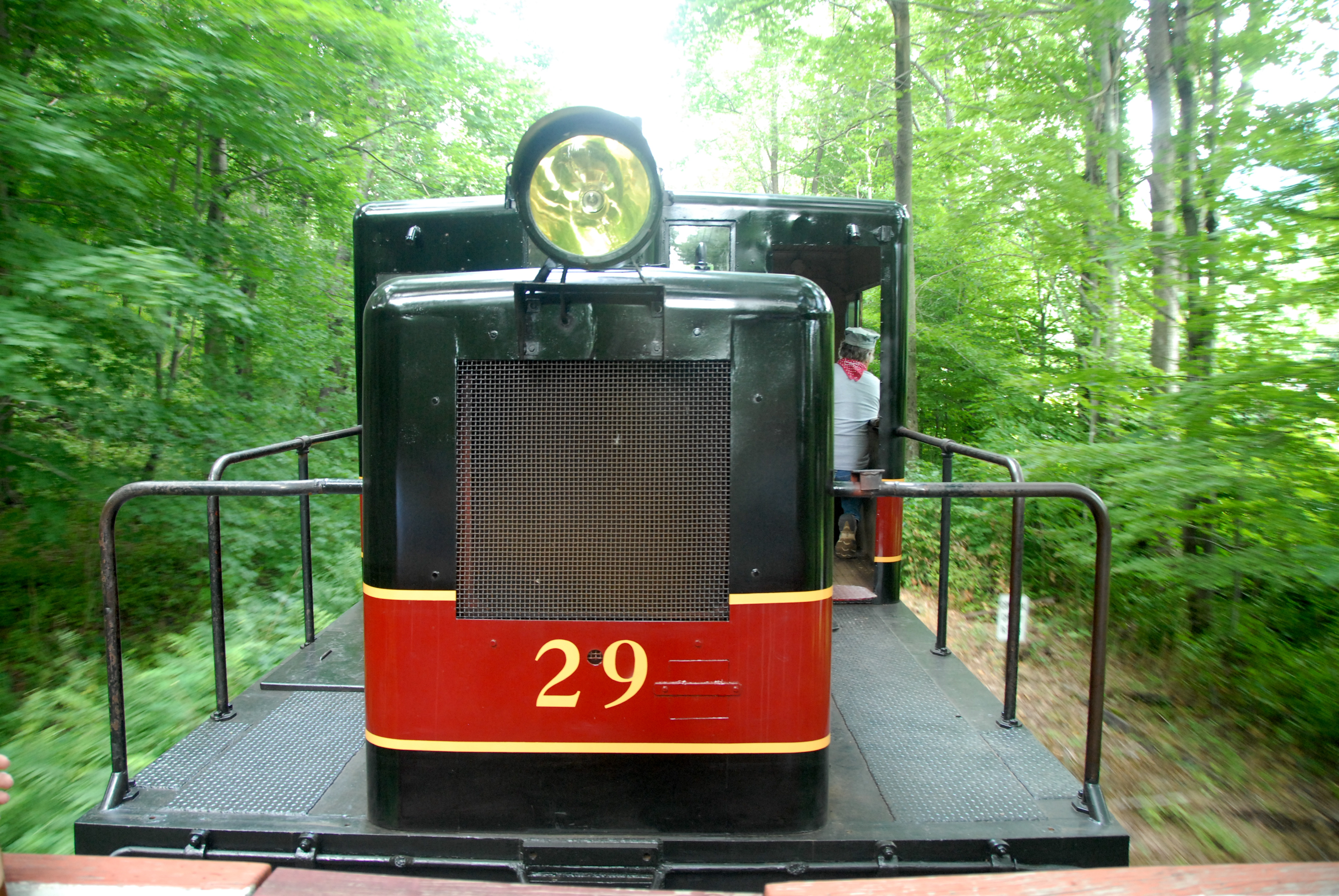
No. 29 in action

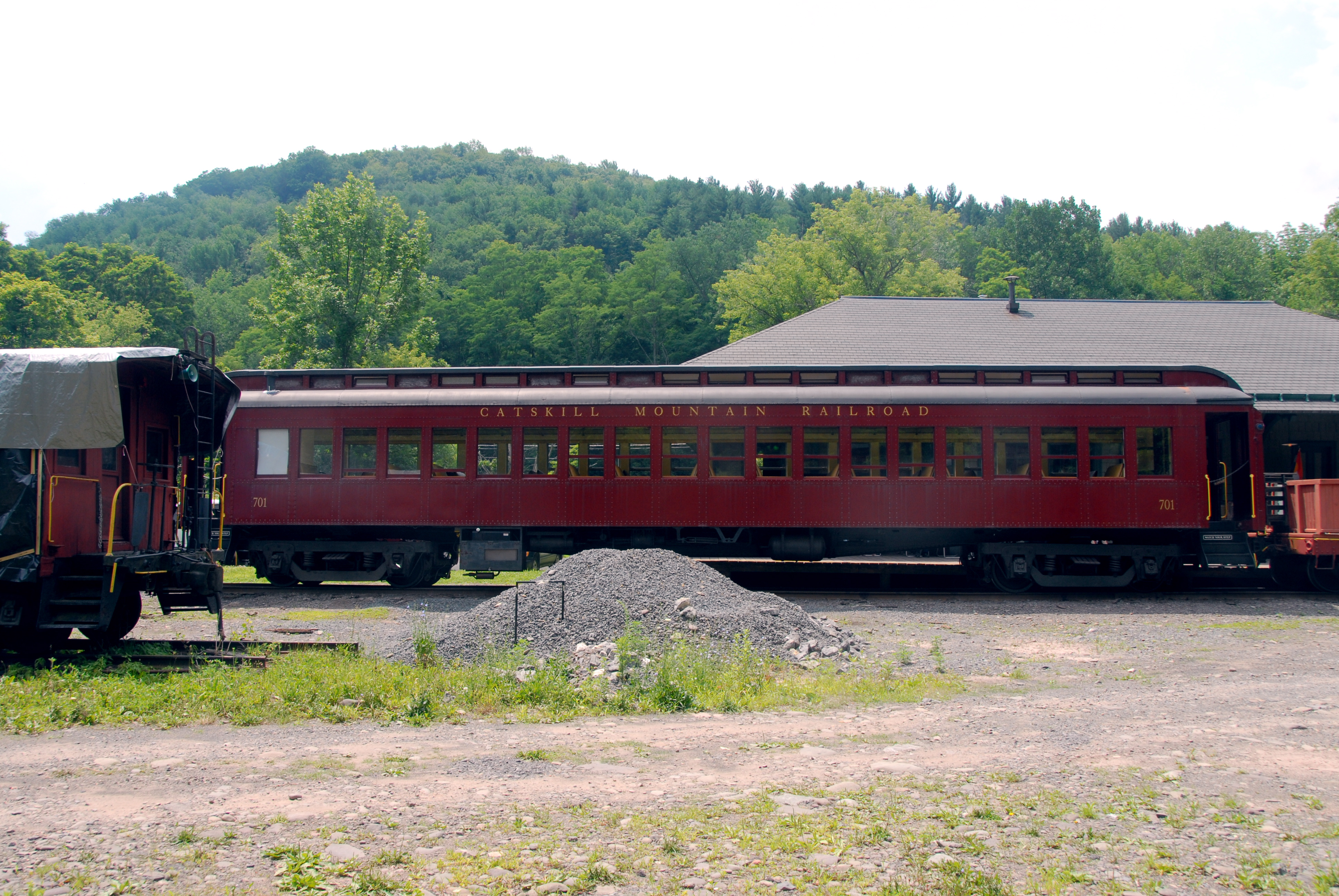
Car No. 701

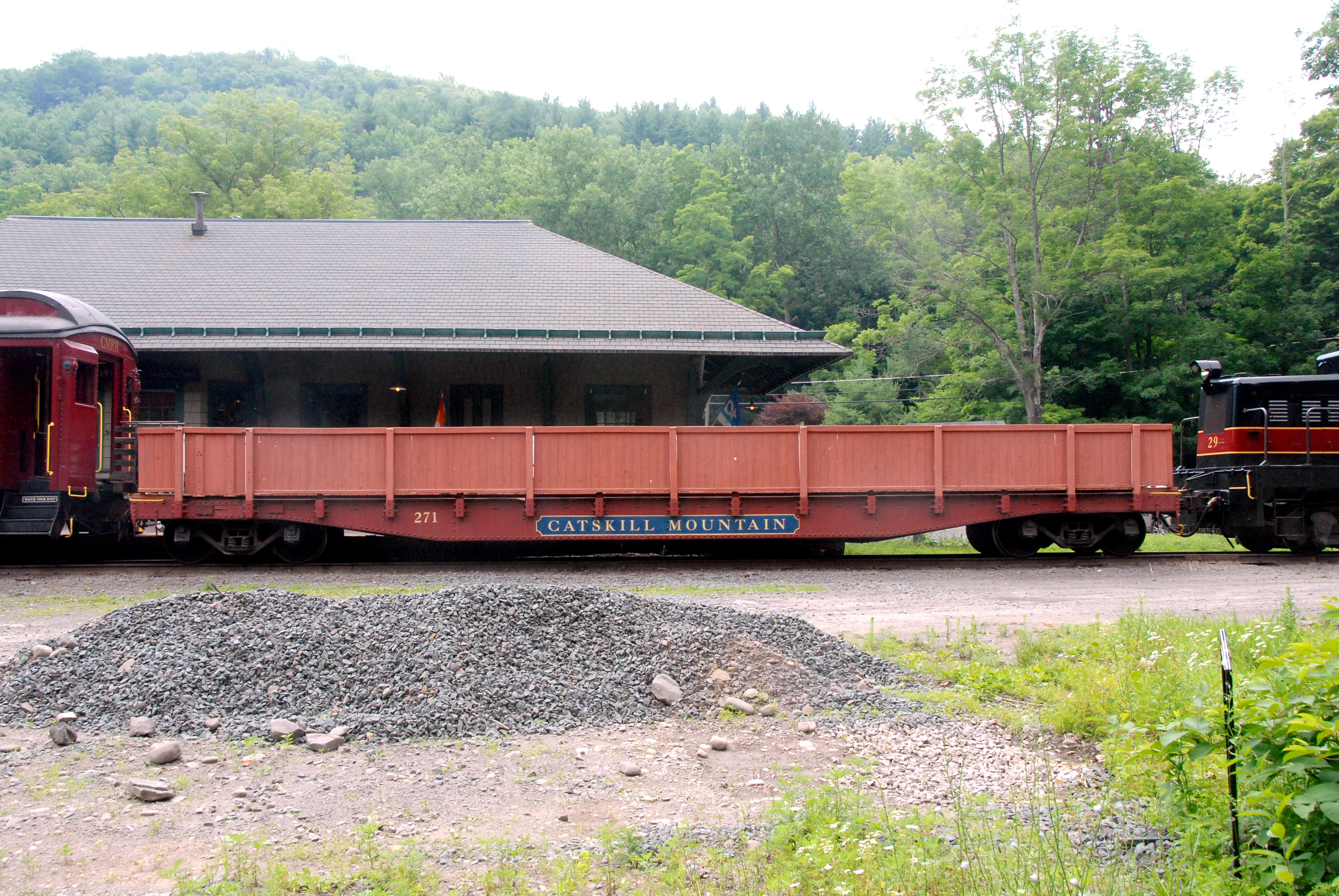
Car No. 271

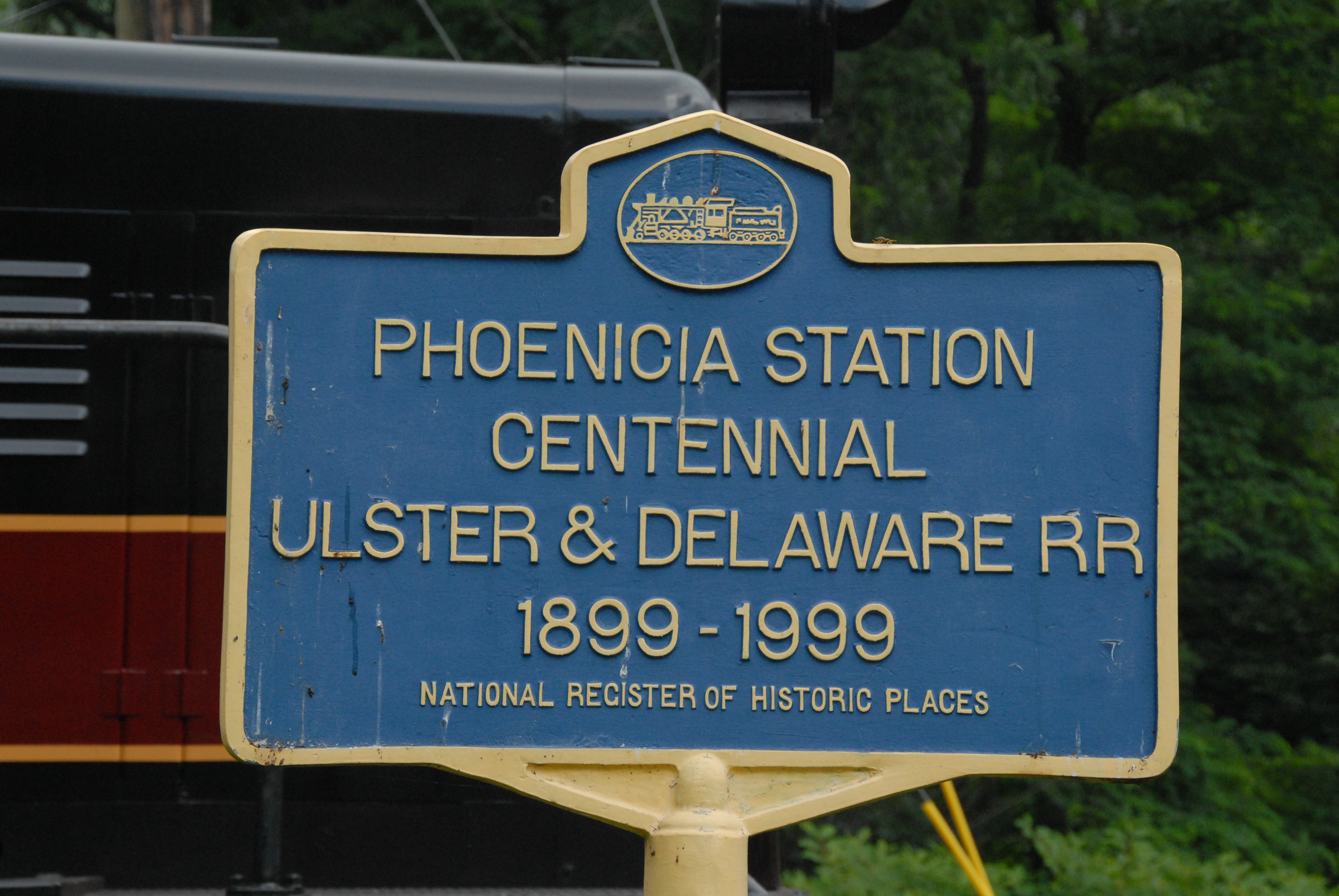
Phoenicia Station NRHP marker

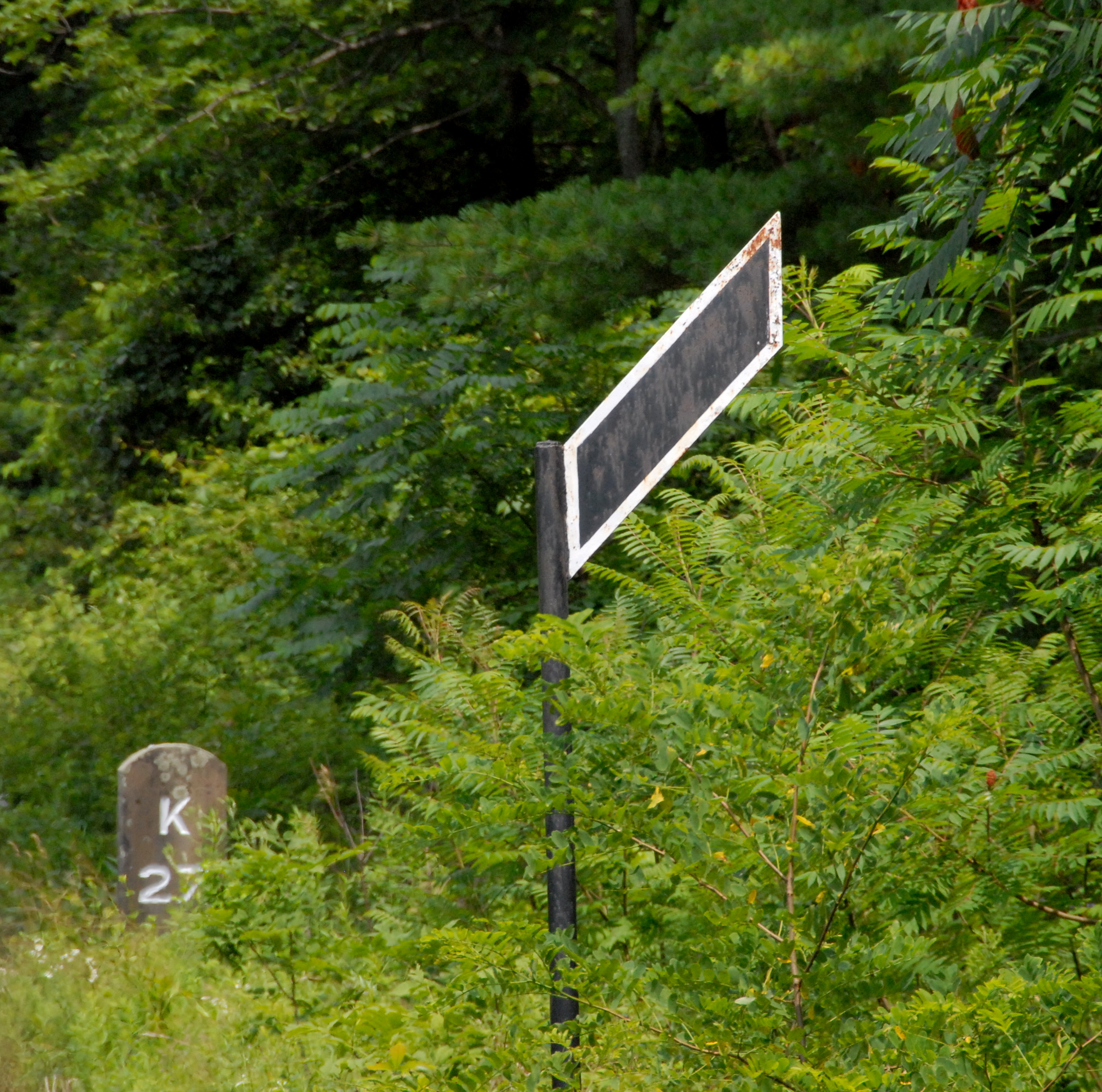
Flanger Sign

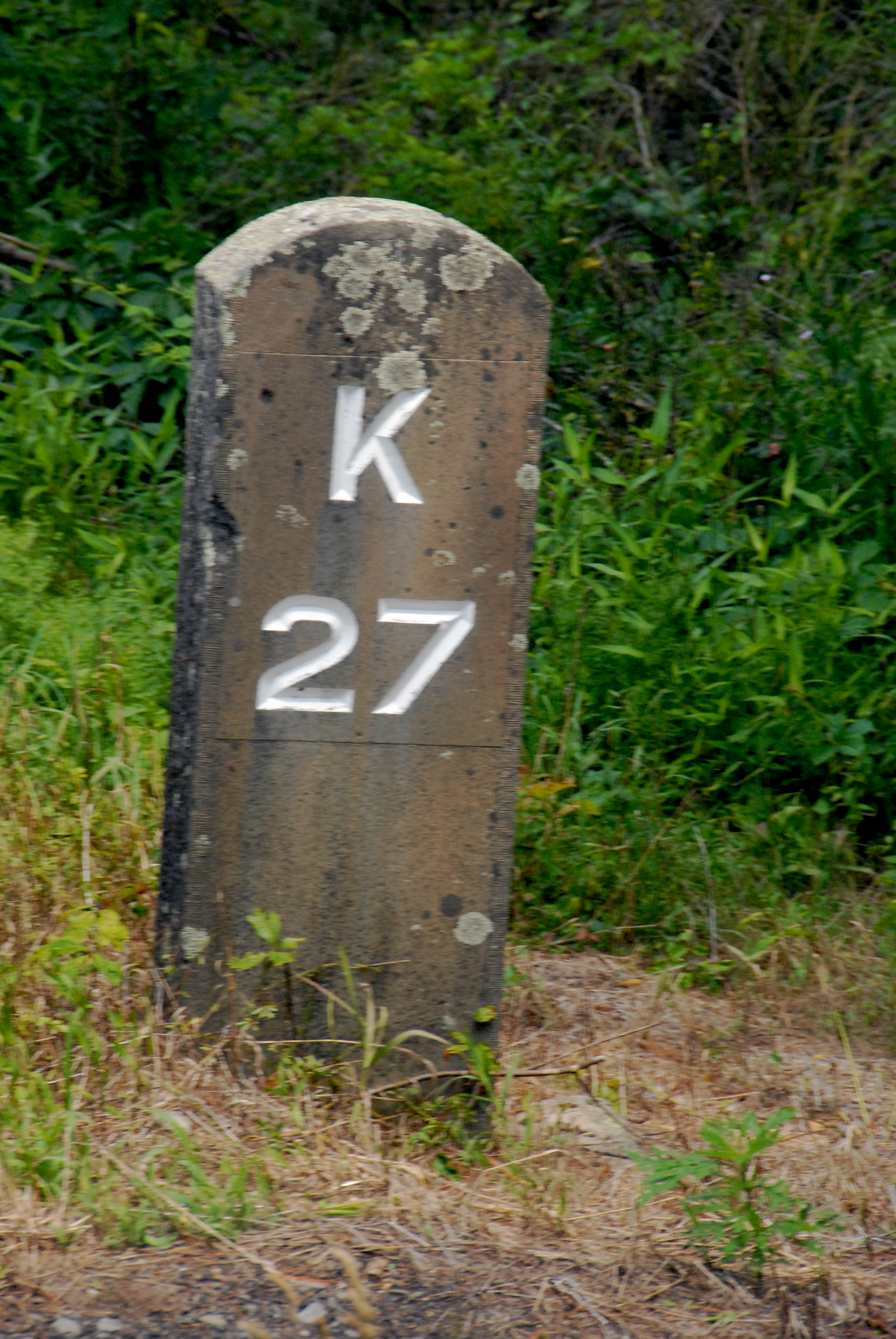
Mile marker

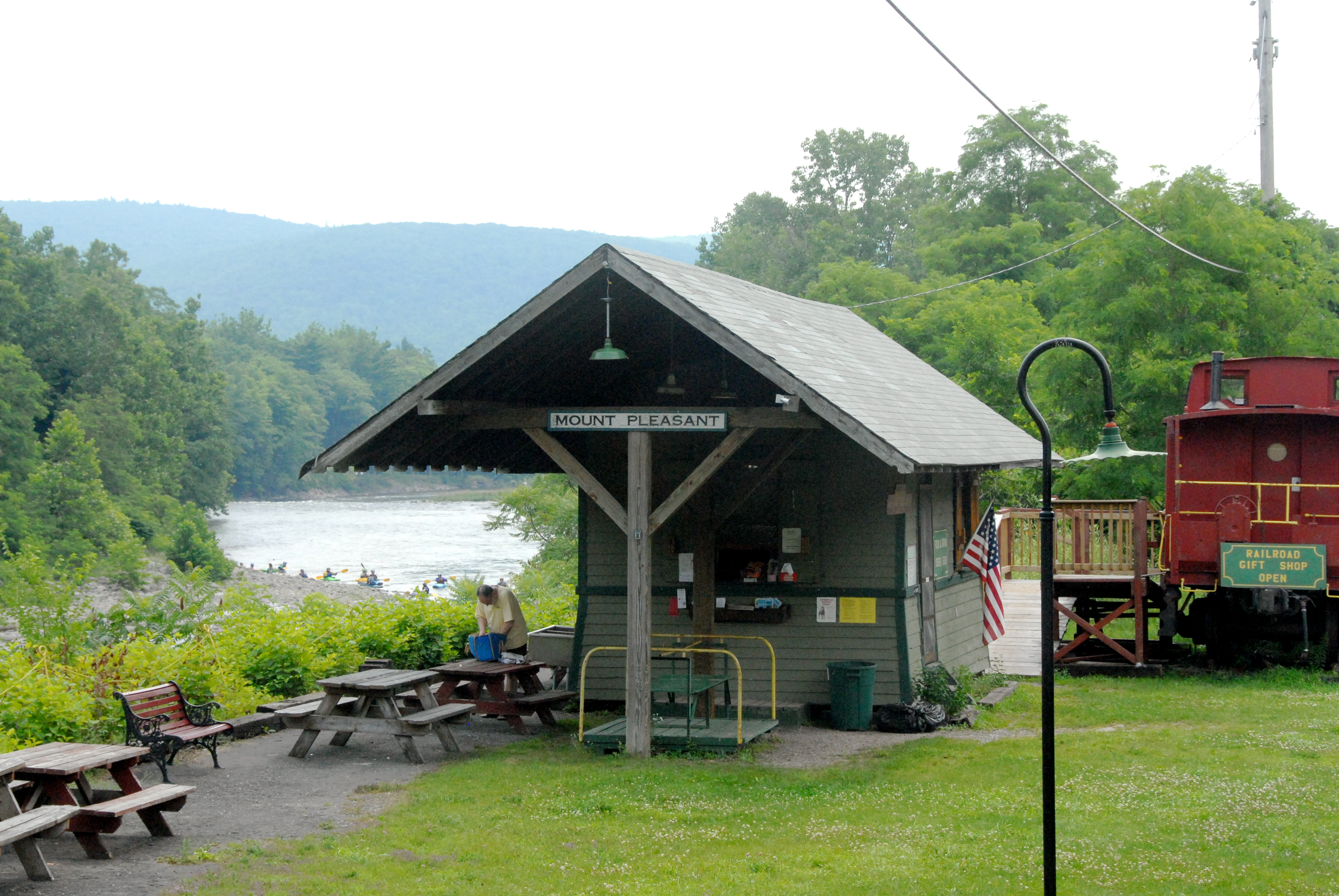
Mount Pleasant station

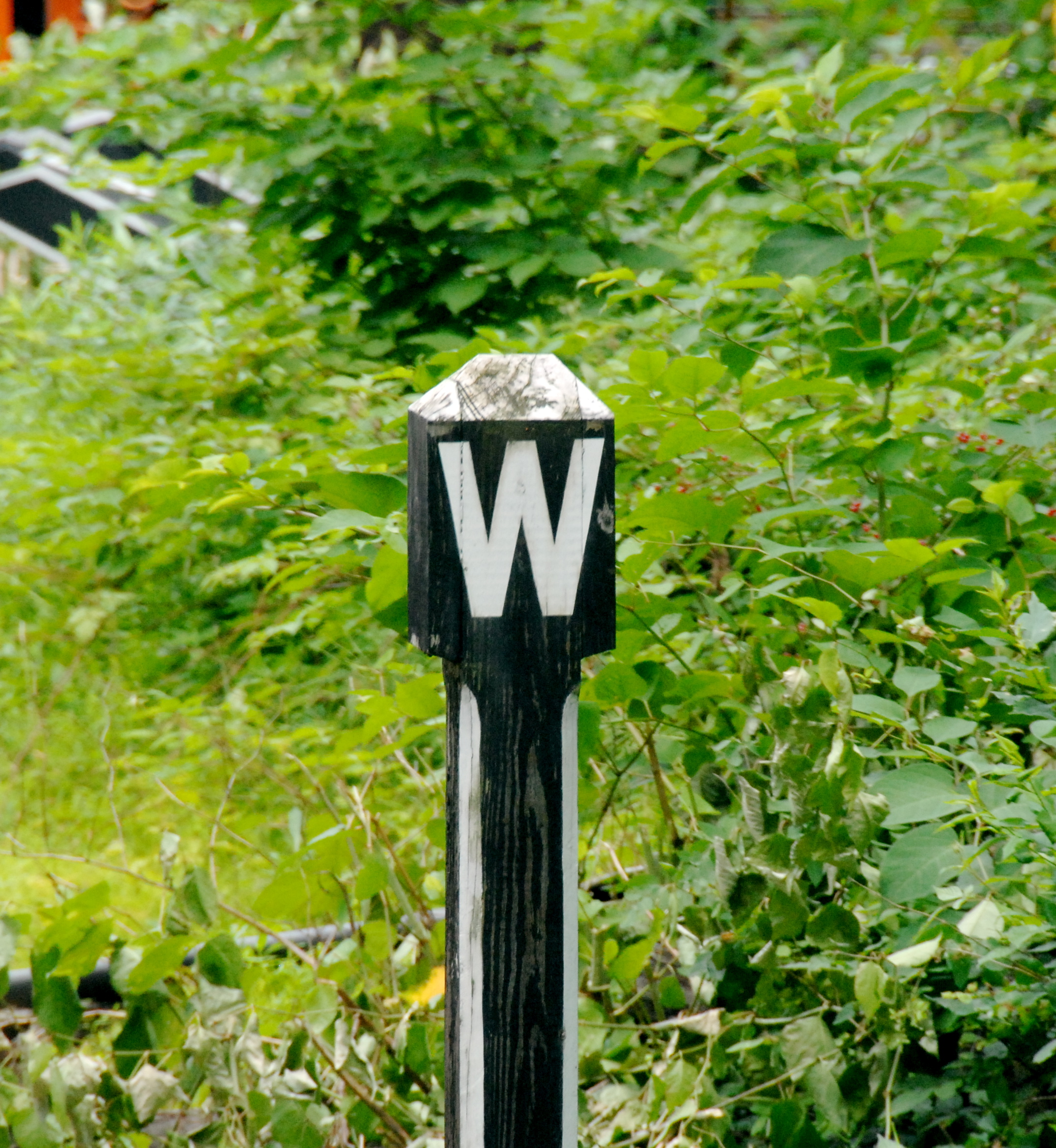
Whistle post

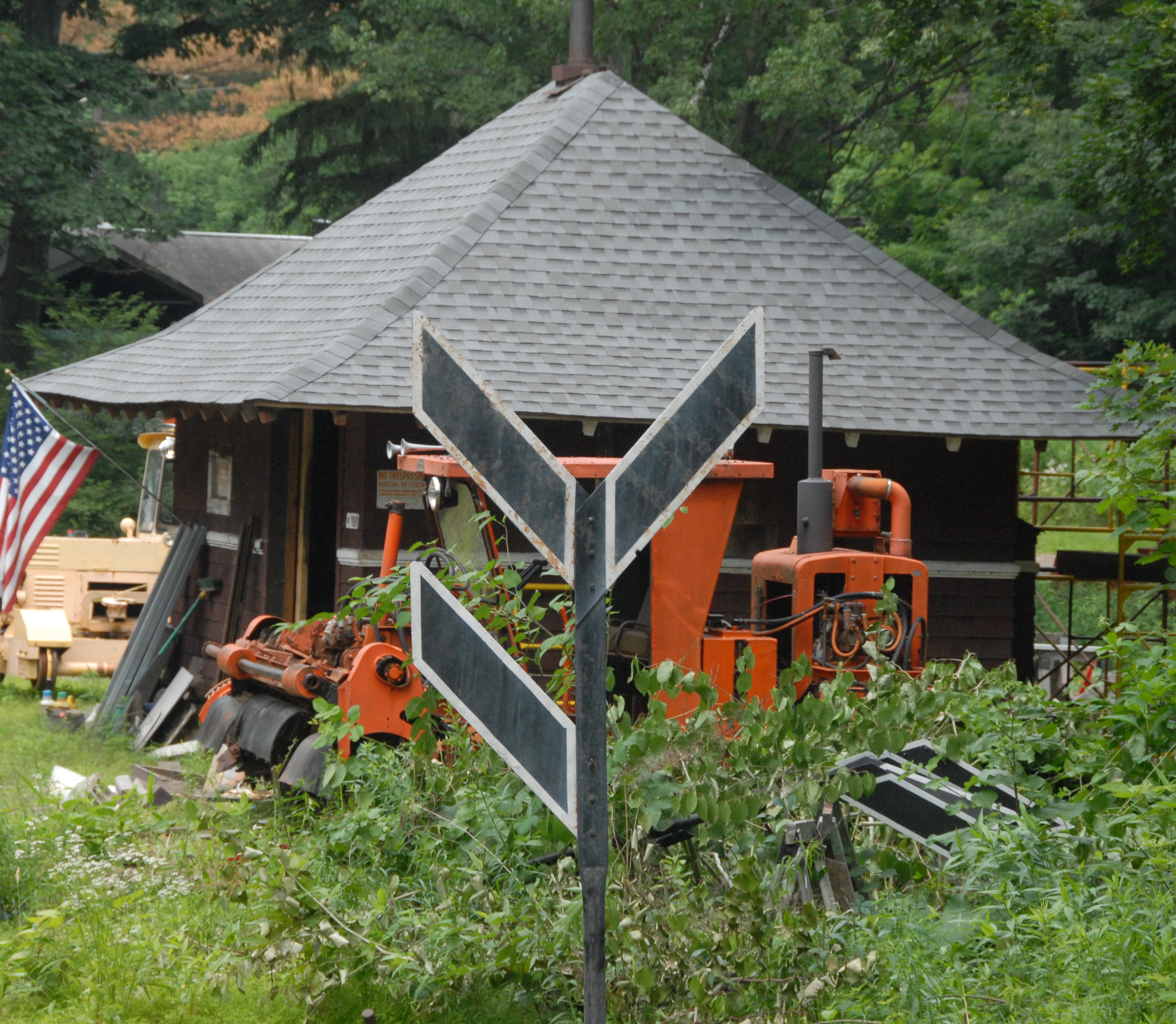
Flanger Sign

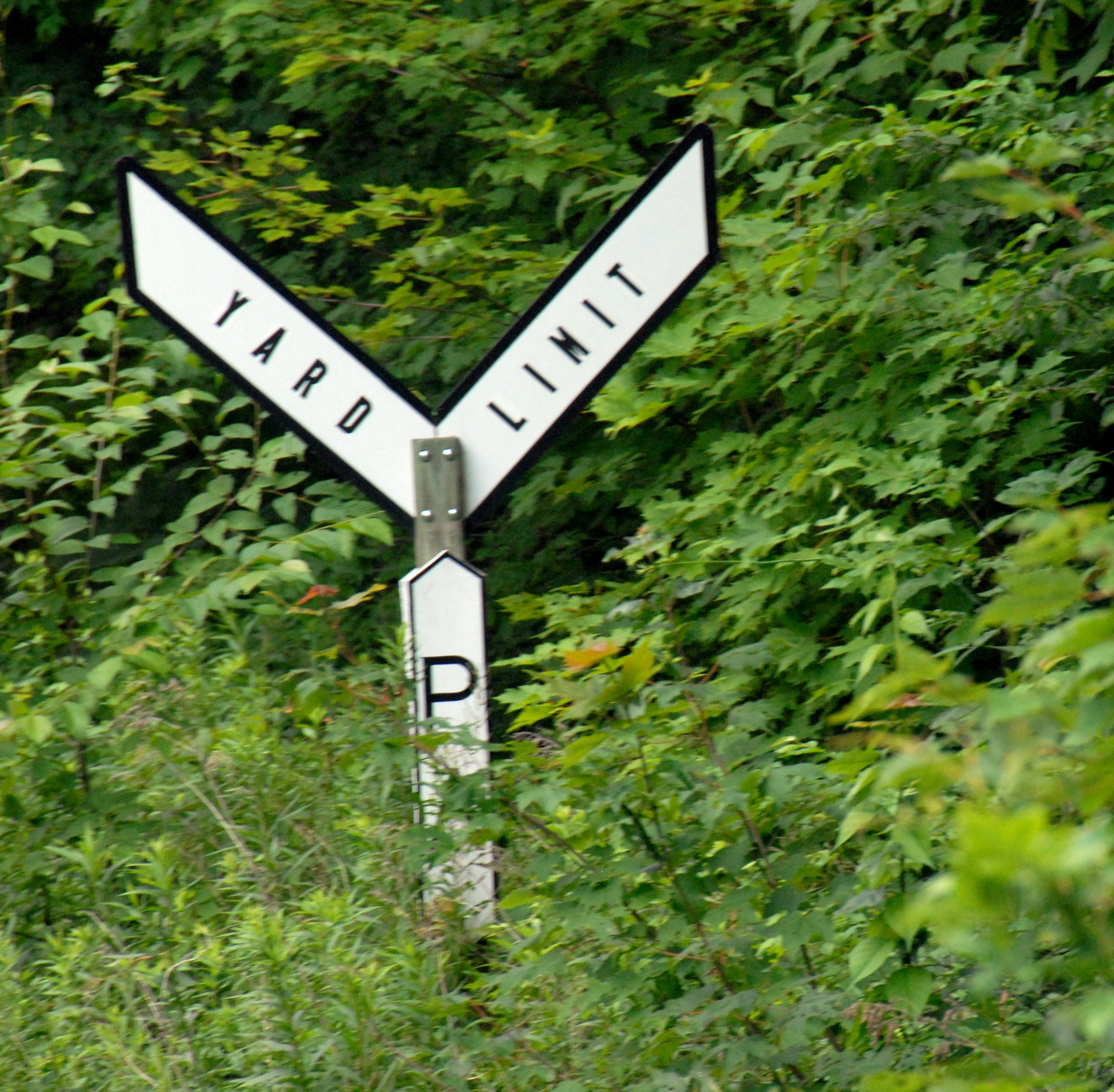
Yard limit marker

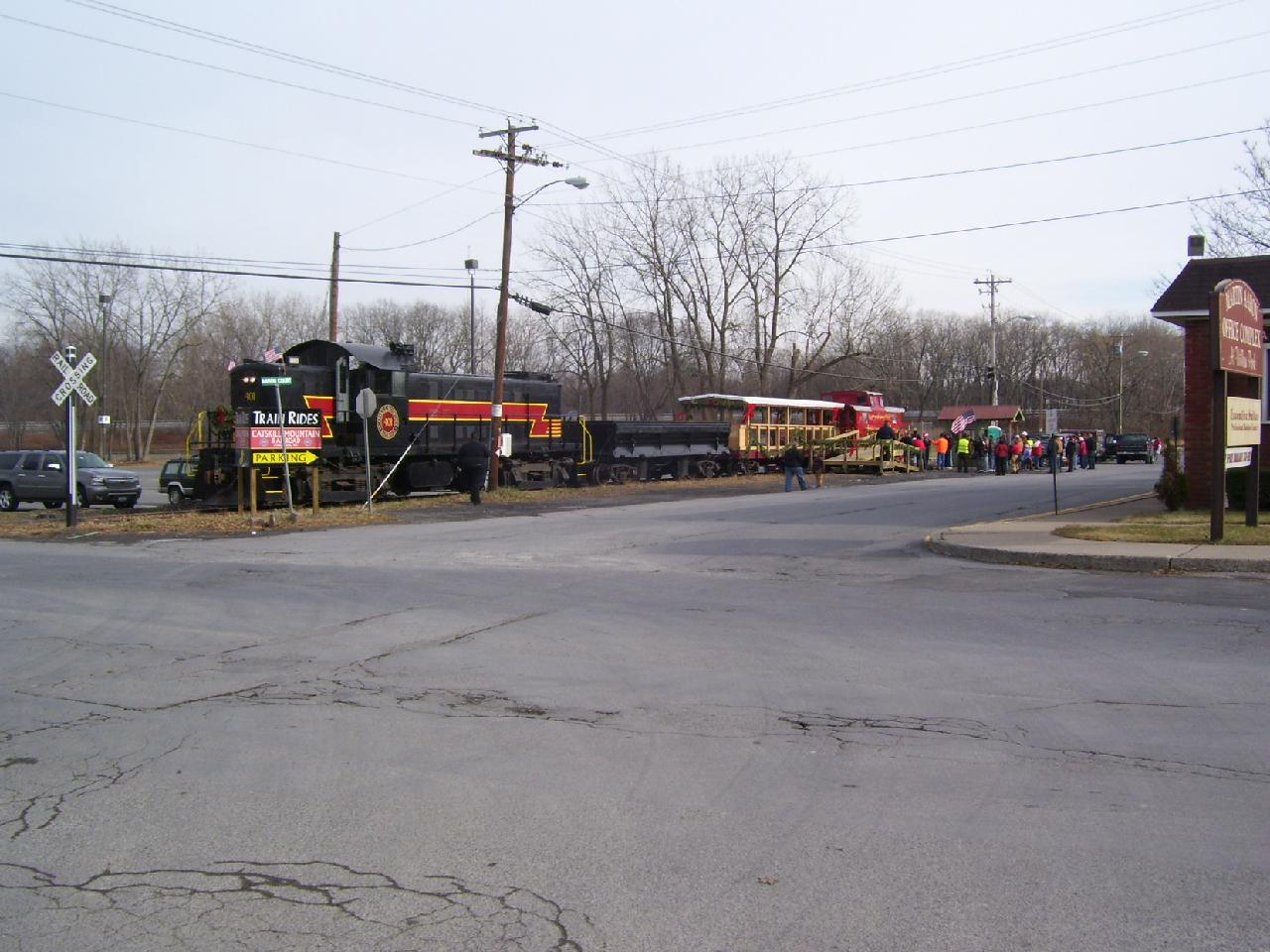
Kingston Holiday Shuttle at Westbrook Station

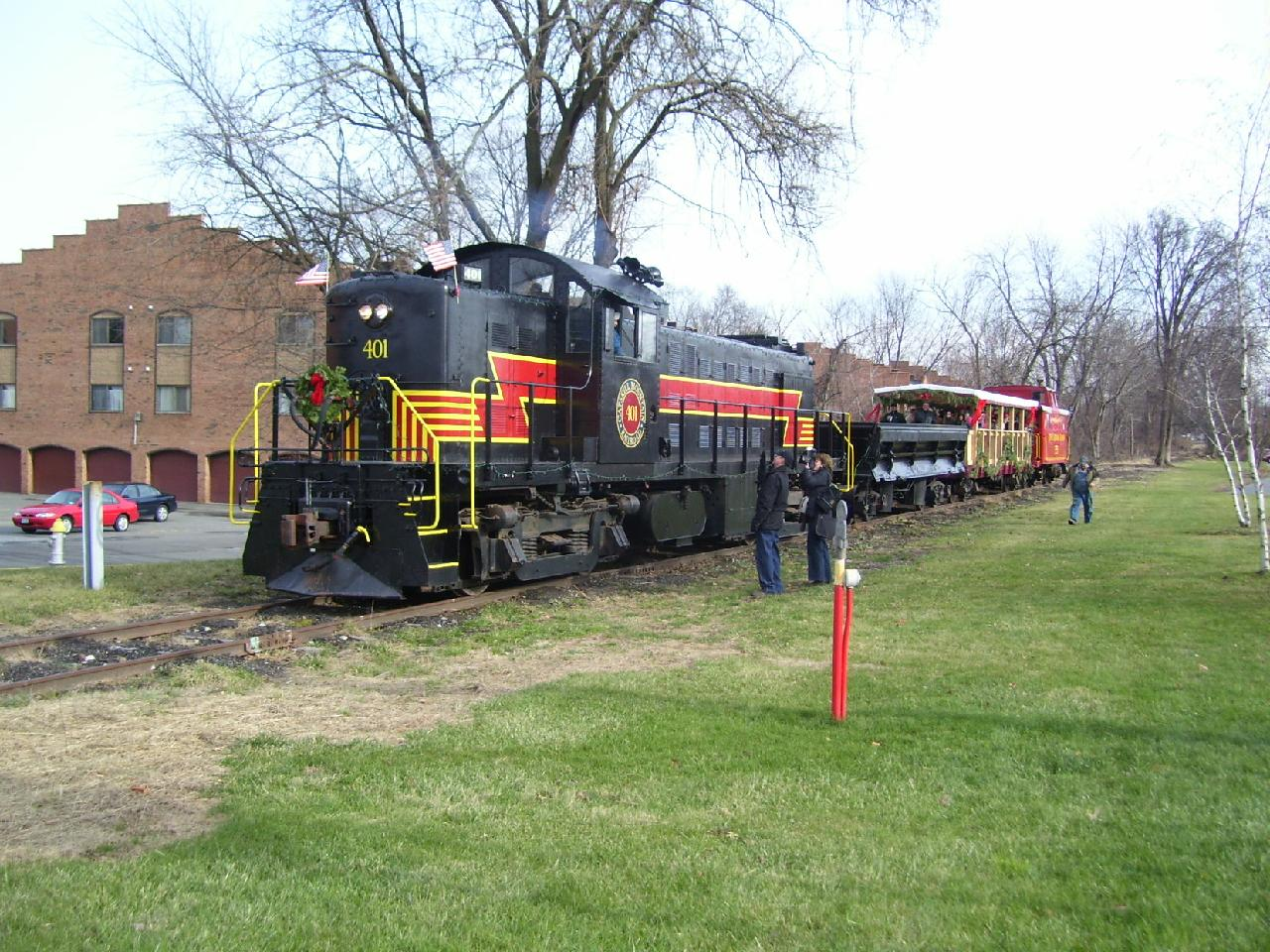
Kingston Holiday Shuttle at Washington Avenue

== See also ==
- Kingston, New York railroad stations
