= West Hurley station =

West Hurley
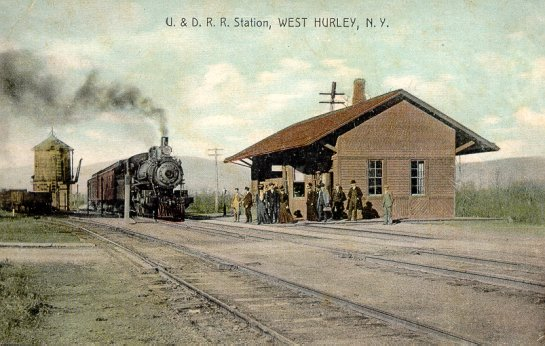
- Postcard view of the former West Hurley station

General information
- Location: West Hurley, Ulster County. New York
- Coordinates: 41°59′41.5″N 74°05′31.8″W
- Tracks: 1

History
- Closed: March 31, 1954

Services
Preceding station	New York Central Railroad	Following station
Ashokan toward Oneonta	Catskill Mountain Branch	Stony Hollow toward Kingston Point
Location

West Hurley, MP 9.8, later MP 10.2, was a railroad station on the Ulster and Delaware Railroad in West Hurley, New York that was constructed in the late nineteenth century and rebuilt during the construction of the Ashokan Reservoir. The original station was made of wood. It was later torn down and temporarily replaced with a board-and-batten shed close to Woodstock, which created much local indignation. A new brick station to replace it was constructed at the West Hurley Dike of the Ashokan Reservoir. The depot was torn down in 1967.

Water service was available for steam engines at this station. A water tower was located northwest of the station, which served water plugs located between the tracks.

== Present condition ==
The West Hurley station area retained a single, 750-foot-long (230 m) siding that was used by the railroad to store the first half of a train when it was necessary to break a train while coming up the 2% grade from Kingston until 2018, when both tracks were removed by Ulster County to create a new rail-trail.

The Catskill Mountain Railroad had planned to use the siding as a storage track for four passenger cars, a ballast hopper and a gondola, which were to be brought up from Kingston in 2007.

The foundations of the depot are still easily seen, and the CMRR planned to further clear out the area around the station and the siding in 2007.
