= Brodhead's Bridge station =

Brodhead's Bridge
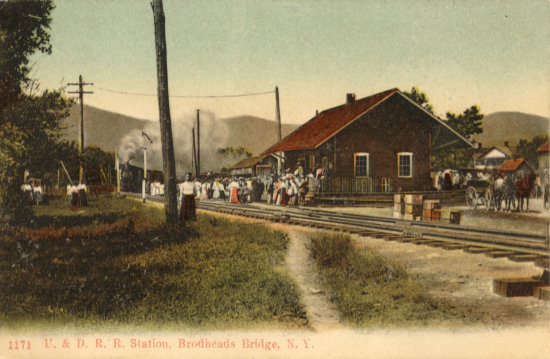
- The former Brodhead's Bridge station on a postcard.

General information
- Location: Brodhead's Bridge, Olive, Ulster County, New York
- Coordinates: 41°57′22″N 74°14′50″W
- Tracks: 1

History
- Closed: June 8, 1913

Services
| Preceding station | New York Central Railroad | Following station |
|---|---|---|
| Shokan toward Oneonta | Catskill Mountain Branch | Ashokan toward Kingston Point |
Location

The railway station of the hamlet of Brodhead's Bridge in Olive, New York was at milepost 18.1 on the Ulster and Delaware Railroad. It was a destination for tourists and vacationers from New York City who would stay at local resort homes (boarding houses) and use the nearby Esopus Creek to swim and fish. Similar resort villages named Atwood and Olive Bridge were also served by this station, which was abandoned in 1913 before it was submerged by the waters of the newly built Ashokan Reservoir.
