= Cold Brook station =

Former railroad station in New York, US

Coordinates: 42°0′17.2″N 74°16′14.1″W

Cold Brook
- Cold Brook station is now privately owned, used as a club house by a local hunting and fishing club.

General information
- Location: Cold Brook Road, Boiceville, Olive, New York 12412
- Tracks: 1

Other information
- Status: Privately owned by hunting and fishing club.

History
- Opened: 1900
- Closed: March 31, 1954
- Rebuilt: June 1915–c. September 1915

Services
| Preceding station | New York Central Railroad | Following station |
|---|---|---|
| Mount Pleasant toward Oneonta | Catskill Mountain Branch | Ashokan toward Kingston Point |
| Mount Pleasant toward Oneonta | Catskill Mountain Branch | Boiceville Closed 1913 toward Kingston Point |
Location

Cold Brook is a former railroad station in the Boiceville section of the town of Olive, Ulster County, New York, United States. Located on Cold Brook Road, just north of New York State Route 28A next to Esopus Creek, Cold Brook station served the New York Central Railroad's Catskill Mountain Branch, formerly the Ulster and Delaware Railroad. The station was located 22.1 miles (35.6 km) northwest of Kingston Point station in the city of Kingston.

The station replaced a flag stop at Cold Brook Bridge and became the primary station for Boiceville on June 8, 1913, when the railroad abandoned the alignment and station through Boiceville for construction of the Ashokan Reservoir. The Ulster and Delaware commenced construction on a new station depot in June 1915. Construction was completed c. September 1915.

The New York Central Railroad ended passenger service on the Catskill Mountain Branch on March 31, 1954, and despite being given permission to demolish the station in April 1955, the station continues to stand. The station is also an access point for the Ashokan Rail Trail, a rail trail runs from Cold Brook to West Hurley.

== Bibliography ==
- Ham, John M.; Bucenec, Robert K. (2003). The Old "Up and Down" Catskill Mountain Branch of the New York Central. Stony Clove & Catskill Mountain Press. ISBN 9780972070911.
