= Kingston, New York railroad stations =

There were four stations built to serve the city of Kingston, New York. The first station was known as "Higginsville Station" built by the Rondout & Oswego railroad company (later known as the Ulster & Delaware (U&D)). The second station was served by three different railroads, all of which eventually became part of the New York Central railroad company. The third station, known as "Fair Street Station", replaced the Higginsville Station in 1882. The fourth station was for the New York, Ontario and Western Railway.

== Higginsville station ==
Located near MP 4.4 on the U&D at the time of its construction in about 1869, Higginsville was the first station location for Kingston. It was situated just west of the current Washington Avenue. The Rondout & Oswego was Kingston's only railroad at the time.

== Union Station ==
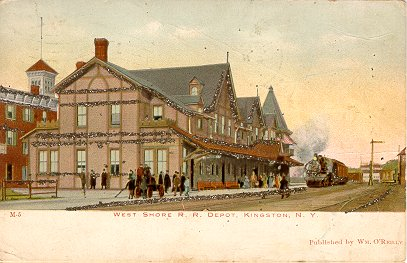
The Kingston Union Station

The next railroad to serve Kingston was the broad-gauge (6 ft) Wallkill Valley Railroad, an affiliate of the Erie system. Following soon afterward was the West Shore Railroad, which quickly bought up the Wallkill Valley. In 1883, at the junction of the West Shore Railroad, Wallkill Valley Railroad and U&D, Kingston Station, also known as "Union Station", was built by the West Shore Railroad. Operating costs were shared by New York Central and the U&D, which then discontinued use of the Fair Street Station. Passenger service on the Wallkill Valley RR ended in 1937.

There was also a nearby station for the Colonial City trolley line under the West Shore Railroad tracks.

Kingston Station, MP 2.8, became one of the busiest stations serving the U&D. The U&D went along the north side of the station while the Wallkill and West Shore ran in front (east) of it.

In 1885, the West Shore became a part of the NYC. On February 1, 1932, the U&D ceased to exist and became the Catskill Mountain Branch of the NYC; Kingston Station became a NYC station. In its latter years (the early 1950s), one morning train a day (except Sundays) ran on the route from Kingston to Oneonta and one afternoon train in the east-bound direction ran back to Kingston. Passenger service on the old U&D route ended on March 31, 1954.

NYC West Shore line service in the latter 1950s dwindled to one Kingston–Weehawken trip a day in each direction and one full-length Albany–Kingston–Weehawken trip a day in each direction; this last passenger service to Kingston ended in 1958. The station was then abandoned. It had deteriorated so badly that it was torn down in the 1960s, although some local groups tried to save it.

== Fair Street station ==
Located near MP 4.0 on the U&D at the time of its construction in 1882, Fair Street Station was near the central business district of Kingston. The change from Higginsville to Fair Street was the result of an agreement made in 1881 between Thomas Cornell, as president of the railroad company, and a committee of citizens. Fair Street station closed in 1898.

== New York, Ontario & Western station ==
In 1902, the New York, Ontario and Western (O&W) constructed a branch from Summitville to Kingston, and built a station west and slightly north of the site of the U&D's early Fair Street Station. Passenger service had already been terminated by 1950. This station survived until the railroad was shut down on March 30, 1957. The station was torn down in the 1960s.

== Catskill Mountain Railroad station ==
The Catskill Mountain Railroad, which leases the former Ulster and Delaware Railroad in Ulster County, New York started a special event shuttle in Kingston on December 6, 2008. A small ticket office and loading platform were placed just east of Westbrook Lane, MP 3.78. This ticket office is known as Westbrook Station. Its location is about 1/4 mile east of the former U&D Fair Street Station.

== See also ==
- List of Ulster and Delaware Railroad stations

Preceding station	New York Central Railroad	Following station
Albany toward Buffalo–Exchange Street	River Division	Milton toward Weehawken
Lake Katrine toward Buffalo–Exchange Street	River Division	Port Ewen toward Weehawken
Stony Hollow toward Oneonta	Catskill Mountain Branch	Rondout toward Kingston Point
Terminus	Wallkill Valley Branch	Whiteport toward Montgomery
