= Fleischmann's station =

Train station in New York

Fleischmann's
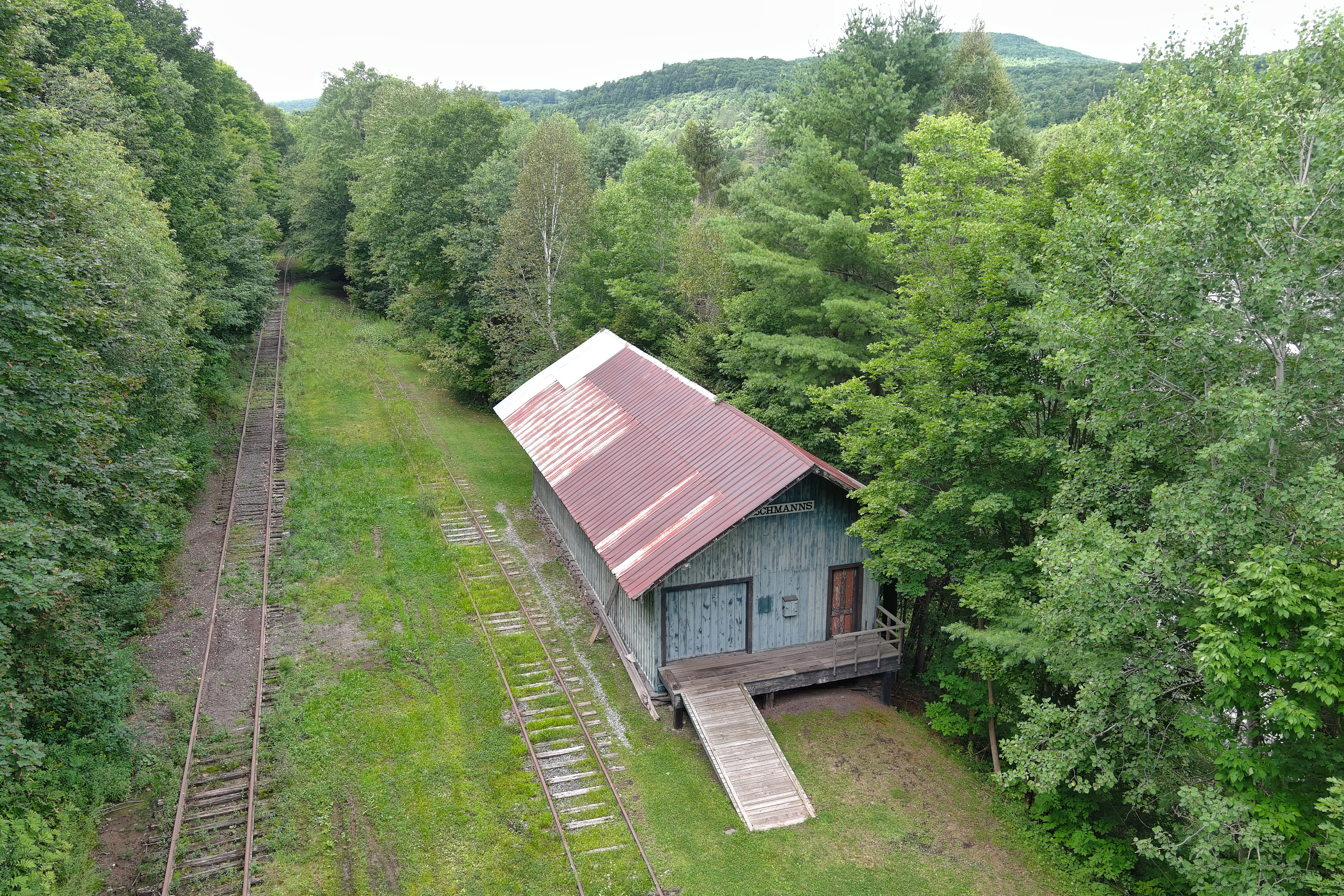
- The former freight house of Fleischmann's station in 2021.

General information
- Location: Fleischmanns Heights Road, Fleischmanns, New York
- Coordinates: 42°9′14.5″N 74°32′35″W
- Tracks: 1

History
- Closed: March 31, 1954

Services
Preceding station	New York Central Railroad	Following station
Arkville toward Oneonta	Catskill Mountain Branch	Grand Hotel toward Kingston Point
Location

Fleischmann's is a defunct commuter railroad station in the eponymous village of Fleischmanns, Delaware County, New York. Located at the junction of Fleischmanns Heights, Todd Mountain Roads and Depitts Lane, the station served trains of the New York Central Railroad's Catskill Mountain Branch from Kingston Point in Ulster County to Oneonta in Otsego County. Fleischmanns station had a single side platform with a station depot and serviced by only one track with a nearby freight siding. The station's freight depot remains standing next to the former siding.

Railroad service in the area began with the construction of the Rondout and Oswego Railroad from Phoenicia to Dean's Corners (modern-day Arkville) in 1871. A station was opened at Griffin's Corners, one of two hamlets in the area. The community became the summer home of Charles Louis Fleischmann when doctors requested that the yeast entrepreneur be outdoors on a more regular basis. His family purchased 60 acres (24 ha) near Griffin's Corners and built their own mansion near the station. The movement of the Fleischmann family to the area caused growth around the area. The station would also be the location where the Ulster and Delaware Railroad would take private railcars for the Fleischmann family to take home. At the station, a family-owned marching band would greet them. In 1913, the hamlet of Griffin's Corners became a village and was renamed Fleischmanns in their honor.

Passenger railroad service through Fleischmanns continued until March 30, 1954.

== Bibliography ==
- Klieger, P. Christiaan (2004). Images of America: The Fleischmann Yeast Family. Charleston, South Carolina: Arcadia Publishing. ISBN 0738533416.
