= Arkville station =

Coordinates: 42.147408°N 74.615864°W

Arkville
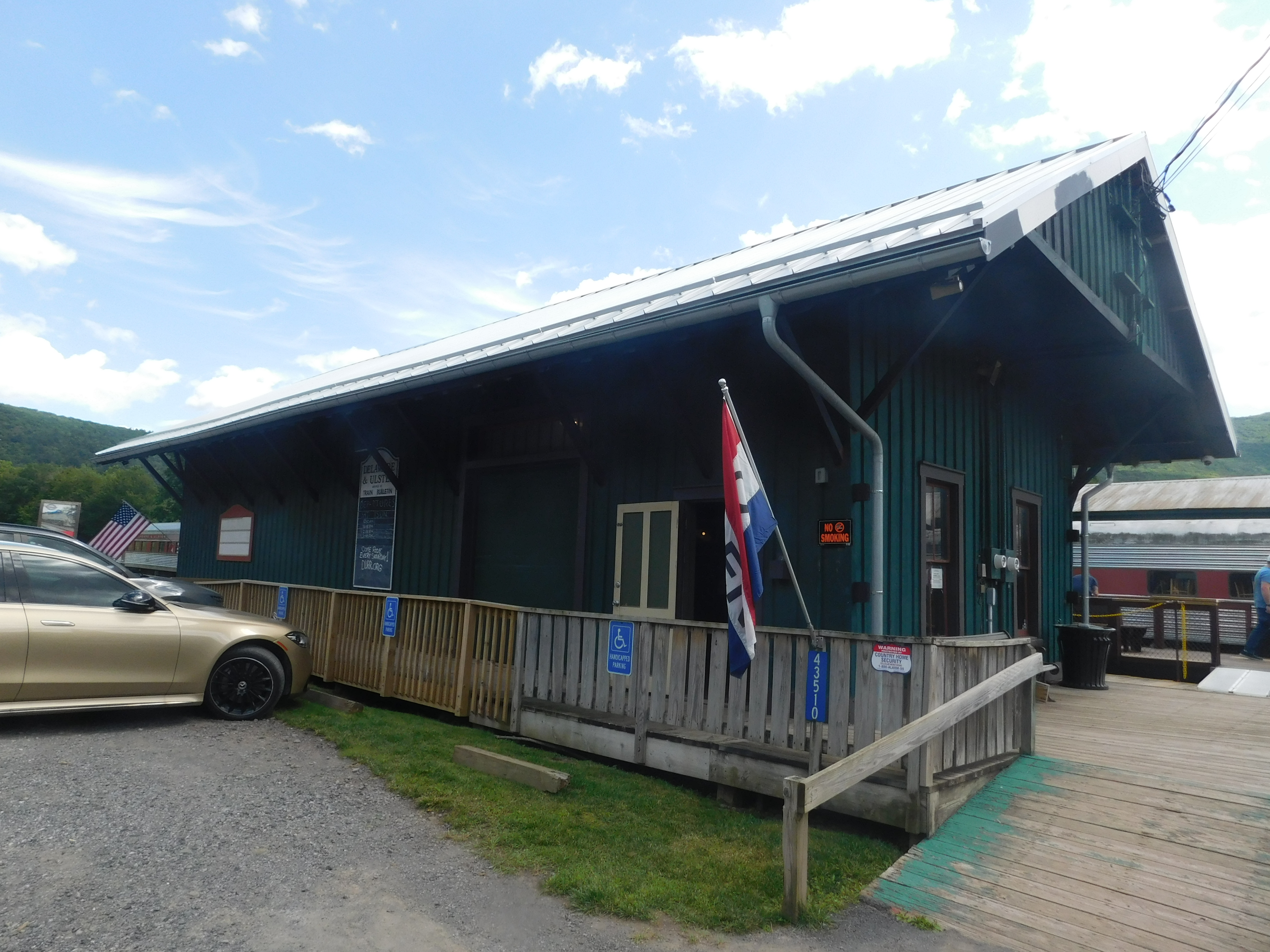
- Arkville's former freight station, now serving as home of the Delaware and Ulster Railroad, in August 2026.

General information
- Location: 43510 NY 28, Arkville, Delaware County. New York
- Tracks: 1

History
- Closed: March 31, 1954

Key dates
- January 22, 1973: Station depot demolished

Services
Preceding station	New York Central Railroad	Following station
Kelly's Corners toward Oneonta	Catskill Mountain Branch	Fleischmann's toward Kingston Point
Location

Arkville station is an active heritage railroad station in the Arkville section of the town of Middletown, Delaware County, New York. Located on State Route 28 (NY 28), the services as the hub of the Delaware and Ulster Railroad. Arkville station services three tracks in a small yard with a single side platform. The freight depot built by the Ulster and Delaware Railroad serves as a museum and ticket office.

Railroad service in modern-day Arkville began with the construction of the Rondout and Oswego Railroad extension from Phoenicia in Ulster County in 1871.

== Ulster and Delaware ==
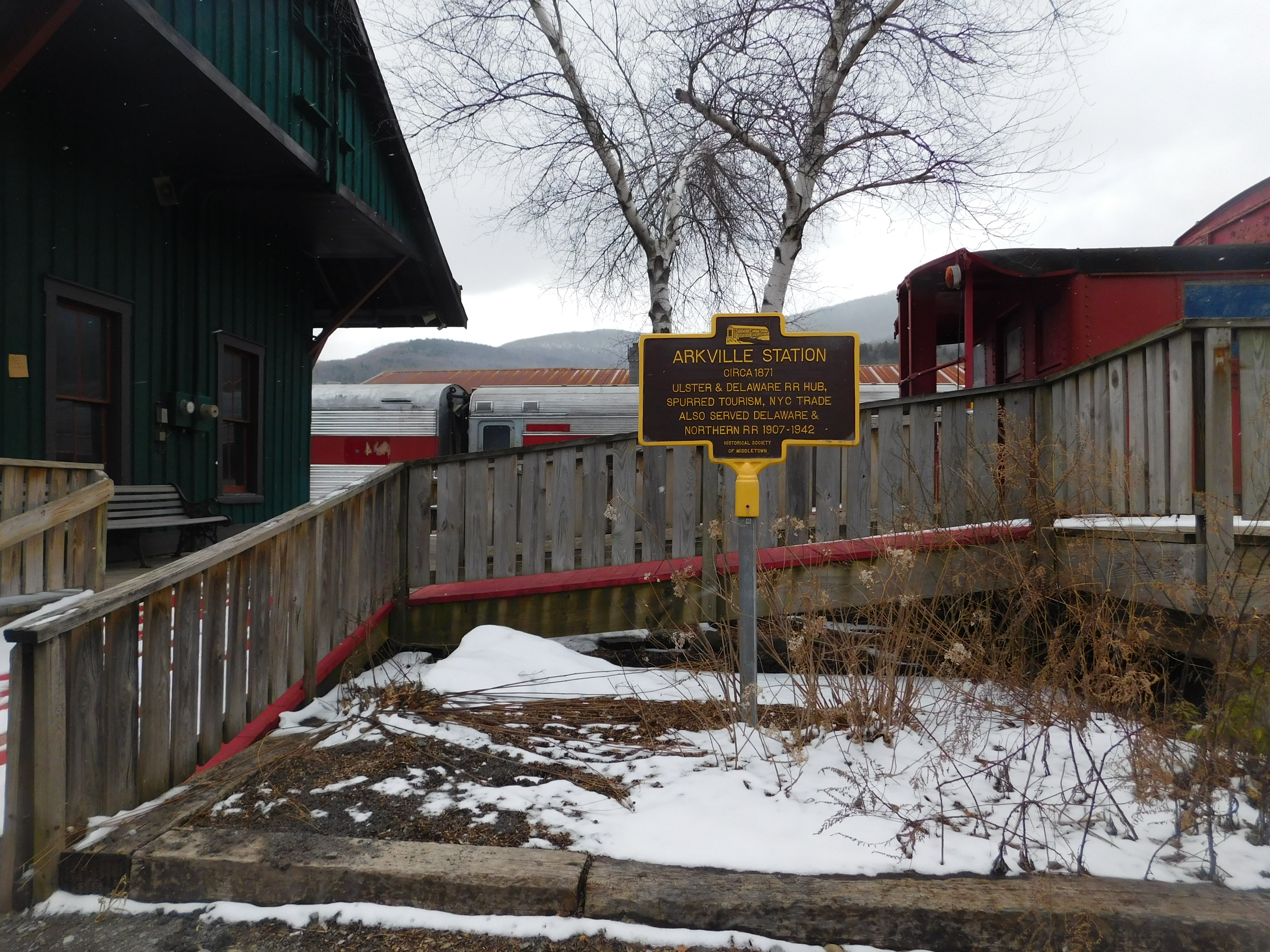
Signage talking about Arkville depot in April 2018

This station was built when the Rondout and Oswego Railroad got to Arkville (then called Dean's Corners) in 1871, covering the site of the ancient Tuscarora Indian headquarters. In addition to the station the U&D also constructed a freight house, engine house, water tower, coaling tower and turntable here. Helper engines were added to eastbound trains here to help on the steep grade to the summit at Grand Hotel station.

Major shippers here included the Luzerene Chemical Company and Callanan Industries. In the late 19th century and early 20th century, Luzerne operated a large wood acid factory located on the flats west of the U&D and north of the D&N. This factory was served by a long siding running south from the U&D. Calanan received large quantities of material used in highway construction up through the 1970s, processing them in a plant located on the flat south of the present Arkville yard. In the town of Arkville, there were several churches, stores, hotels, and even a local waterworks. This station survived until the end of passenger service on the U&D, on March 31, 1954, when the station was abandoned and left to deteriorate. It was hit by a runaway milk truck on January 21, 1973, and was so badly damaged that it was torn down for fear someone would get hurt. Now, the freight half of the Halcottville station and a group of benches are in its place. The U&D's Arkville freight house is now the Arkville station for the Delaware and Ulster Railroad.

== Delaware and Northern ==
Arkville was the eastern terminus of the Delaware and Northern. The D&N track ended at the switch just east of the Route 28 highway crossing, but its trains were allowed to enter the yard and use the turntable. West of New York State Route 28 the D&N had its own freight house, which still stands today as a laundromat, a pizza parlor and an apartment complex. The D&N ran this freight house and did business at the Arkville station until it went bankrupt in 1942. Its equipment was sold for scrap and the railroad was torn up, making way for the new Pepacton Reservoir, which submerged over two-thirds of its right-of-way. The New York Central acquired the portion of the D&N running past the D&N's old freight house and served a retail coal dealer located there until the line was abandoned, on October 3, 1976.
