= Shokan =

Shokan may refer to:

- Shokan, New York, a town in the United States
- Shokan Railroad Station, an abandoned railway station
- Shokan (archaeological site), a village from the late Meroitic period, excavated by the Rijksmuseum van Oudheden, Leiden, the Netherlands in 1962-1964 (named Shokan by the excavators after a contemporary but abandoned hamlet nearby)
