= Kaaterskill Junction station =

Kaaterskill Junction

General information
- Location: Tannersville, Greene County. New York
- Coordinates: 42.1895°N 74.1856°W
- Tracks: 1

History
- Opened: June 25, 1883
- Closed: January 22, 1940

Services
Preceding station	New York Central Railroad	Following station
Tannersville toward Kaaterskill	Kaaterskill Branch	Stony Clove Notch toward Phoenicia
Hunter Terminus	Hunter Branch	Terminus
Location

Kaaterskill Junction station, branch MP 11.8, was one of the smallest stations on the Ulster & Delaware, and served as the station at the junction between the Stony Clove and Kaaterskill Branch and the Hunter Branch, hence the word "junction" in its name. The station was originally known as the Tannersville Junction station, but its name was changed soon after it was made.

Despite its small size, it had more trains than any other station on the branch, and stayed that way until it was abandoned in 1939. Soon after, it was purchased by Harry L'Hommadeu, a land agent for the New York Central, and expanded into a private dwelling. The station burned down on a winter day in the late 1980s.

== Bibliography ==
- Interstate Commerce Commission (1940). Decisions of the Interstate Commerce Commission of the United States (Finance Reports). Washington D.C.: Government Printing Office.
