= Hobart station (New York) =

Former railroad station in Hobart, New York, U.S.

Hobart

General information
- Location: Railroad Avenue and Maple Avenue, Hobart, Delaware County, New York 13788
- Coordinates: 42.3701°N 74.6686°W
- Tracks: 1

History
- Opened: December 1, 1884
- Closed: March 31, 1954

Services
Preceding station	New York Central Railroad	Following station
South Kortright toward Oneonta	Catskill Mountain Branch	Stamford toward Kingston Point
Location

Hobart was a former railroad station in the village of Hobart, Delaware County, New York, United States. The station was run by the New York Central Railroad as part of their Catskill Mountain Branch and located 77.5 miles (124.7 km) from the eastern terminus at Kingston Point station in the city of Kingston. Railroad service in Hobart began on December 1, 1884, when the Hobart Branch Railroad opened for service from nearby Stamford station, an extension of 3.61 miles (5.81 km). The station closed when the railroad discontinued service on the branch on March 31, 1954.

== Bibliography ==
- Poor, Henry Varnum (1886). Poor's Manual of Railroads. New York, New York: H.V. & H.W. Poor.
