= Boiceville station =

Coordinates: 42°0′17.2″N 74°16′14.1″W

Boiceville
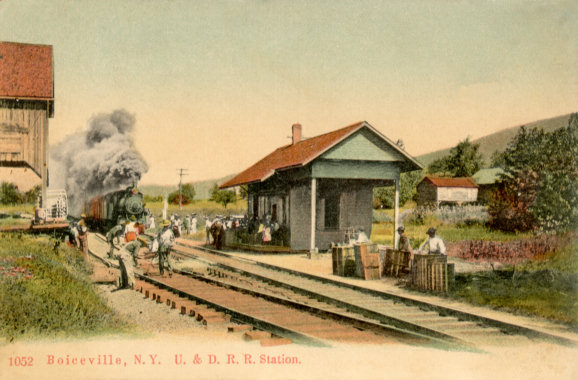
- Postcard view of Boiceville station

General information
- Tracks: 1

History
- Closed: June 8, 1913

Services
Preceding station	New York Central Railroad	Following station
Cold Brook toward Oneonta	Catskill Mountain Branch	Shokan toward Kingston Point
Location

Boiceville Railroad Station was built by the Ulster and Delaware Railroad to serve the community of Boiceville, New York. Located at MP 21.3, Boiceville was the westernmost depot to be removed as a result of the construction of the Ashokan Reservoir. Although the community of Boiceville was submerged, the station site remains above the reservoir level, at a point just west of where the old railroad right of way slips under the waters of the reservoir, and just east of where it diverges from the new line.

In total, 12 miles of railroad were relocated away from the Ashokan Reservoir in 1913. The station stop was replaced by the new Cold Brook station.
