= Stamford station (New York) =

Stamford

General information
- Location: Stamford, Delaware County. New York
- Coordinates: 42°24′25.04″N 74°37′7.1″W
- Tracks: 1

History
- Closed: March 31, 1954

Services
Preceding station	New York Central Railroad	Following station
Hobart toward Oneonta	Catskill Mountain Branch	South Gilboa toward Kingston Point

Stamford station, MP 74.0, was another important railroad station on the mainline of the Ulster and Delaware Railroad. The town it served, Stamford, New York, was home to the Stamford Country Club and the elegant Churchill Hall, and was, not surprisingly, a popular tourist stop, especially for people coming up from New York City. There were more hotels, apart from the Churchill Hall, along with many boarding houses.

The New York Central Railroad acquired the railroad line on February 1, 1932, under pressure by the Interstate Commerce Commission. The company continued passenger service passenger service on the mainline of the U&D until March 31, 1954. This station, like many others, was left to fall-apart after passenger service ended. It was in sorry shape until the Catskill Revitalization Corporation came and restored it. It is now in perfect condition and is used as the headquarters of the CRC.
