= Shokan station =

Coordinates: 41.966°N 74.258°W

Shokan

General information
- Location: West Shokan, Ulster County, New York
- Tracks: 1

History
- Closed: June 8, 1913

Services
Preceding station	New York Central Railroad	Following station
Boiceville toward Oneonta	Catskill Mountain Branch	Brodhead's Bridge toward Kingston Point
Location

This Ulster and Delaware train station, MP 19.2, was a busy station, serving an even busier town. This station was actually located in the village of West Shokan, with the actual town of Shokan being a mile east of the station itself. This station was the stop for summer residents staying at boarding houses, and a stop for local people going to church or school. The station was abandoned on June 8, 1913, and the site is now underwater, as the Ashokan Reservoir was built where 12.45 miles (20.04 km) of U&D trackage used to be.
