= Hunter station (New York Central Railroad) =

Former station on the Ulster and Delaware Railroad

Hunter
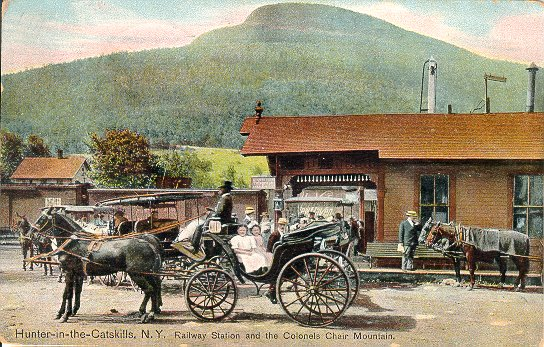
- A postcard of the former Hunter station

General information
- Location: Hunter, Greene County. New York
- Coordinates: 42.2127°N 74.2212°W
- Tracks: 1

History
- Opened: June 24, 1882
- Closed: January 22, 1940

Key dates
- February 21, 1940: Station agent eliminated

Services
| Preceding station | New York Central Railroad | Following station |
|---|---|---|
| Terminus | Hunter Branch | Kaaterskill Junction Terminus |
Location

Hunter station was a train station on the Hunter Branch of the Ulster and Delaware Railroad (U&D) and was the busiest station on the branch lines of the U&D. Within several yards of the station were the Standard Oil Co. and the Otto Gordon Coal Co. The village of Hunter, which the station serviced, was also home to several popular resorts.

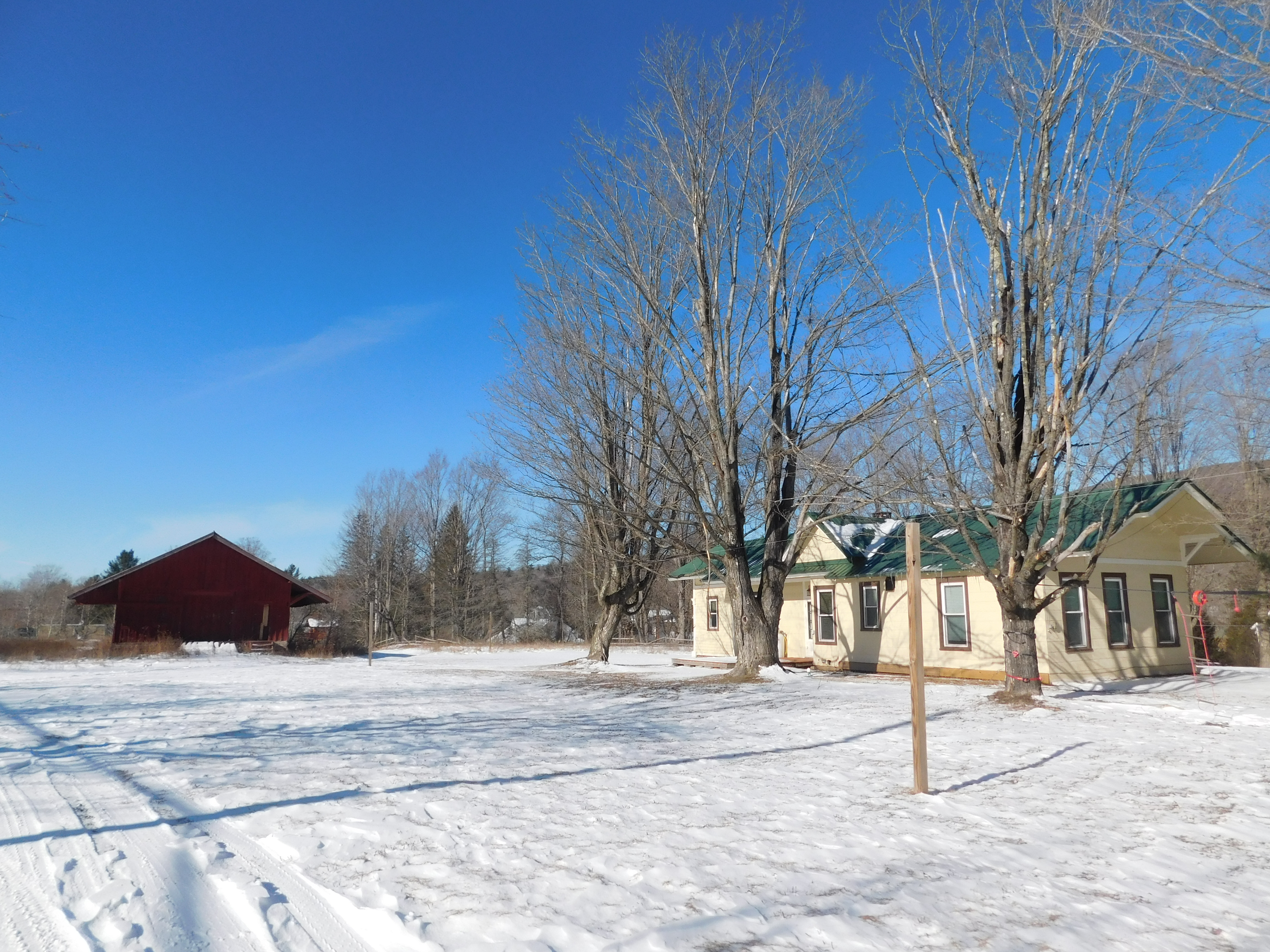
The former station and freight depot at Hunter in January 2026

The station was built in 1882, and was the last station to be built by the narrow-gauge Stony Clove & Catskill Mountain Railroad. The U&D incorporated the smaller railroad in 1899. The station was expanded in 1900.

The U&D was taken over by the New York Central Railroad in 1932, and Hunter station was one of only two stations on the branch lines. However, the branch lines of the U&D were abandoned in 1939, and scrapped in 1940.

The station is now a private dwelling and the freight house is a tool shed.

== Bibliography ==
- Interstate Commerce Commission (1940). Decisions of the Interstate Commerce Commission of the United States (Finance Reports). Washington D.C.: Government Printing Office.
- National Railroad Adjustment Board (1941). Awards 1451 to 1550 Interpretations Third Division. La Grange, Illinois: Suburban Printers and Publishers Inc.
- Poor, Henry Varnum (1886). Poor's Manual of Railroads. New York, New York: H.V. & H.W. Poor.
