= Rondout station =

Railway station in New York

Coordinates: 41°55′12.07″N 73°58′47.85″W

Rondout
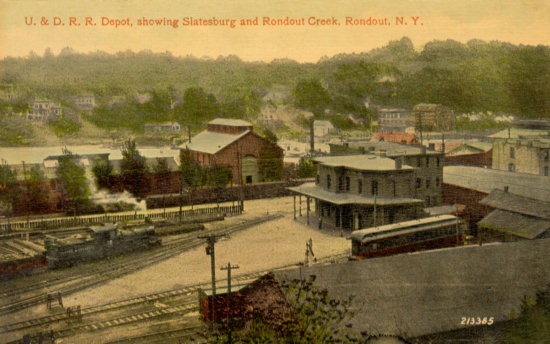
- Postcard view of the former Rondout station.

General information
- Location: East Strand Street, Kingston, Ulster County. New York
- Tracks: 1

History
- Opened: 1868

Services
Preceding station	New York Central Railroad	Following station
Kingston toward Oneonta	Catskill Mountain Branch	Kingston Point Terminus
Location

Rondout was the first station built on the Ulster and Delaware Railroad (U&D). The station was located on East Strand in Rondout, New York (now a section of Kingston), constructed in 1868, and demolished in the 1970s.

The station was on the site of the headquarters and maintenance facility of the U&D and was one of the busiest stations on the line. The roundhouse and locomotive repair shops portions of the site are now the location of the Kingston Water Treatment plant. The remainder of the site is currently used by the Trolley Museum of New York.
