= Ashokan station =

Former railroad station in Olive, New York, U.S.

Coordinates: 41°58′35″N 74°11′47″W

Ashokan
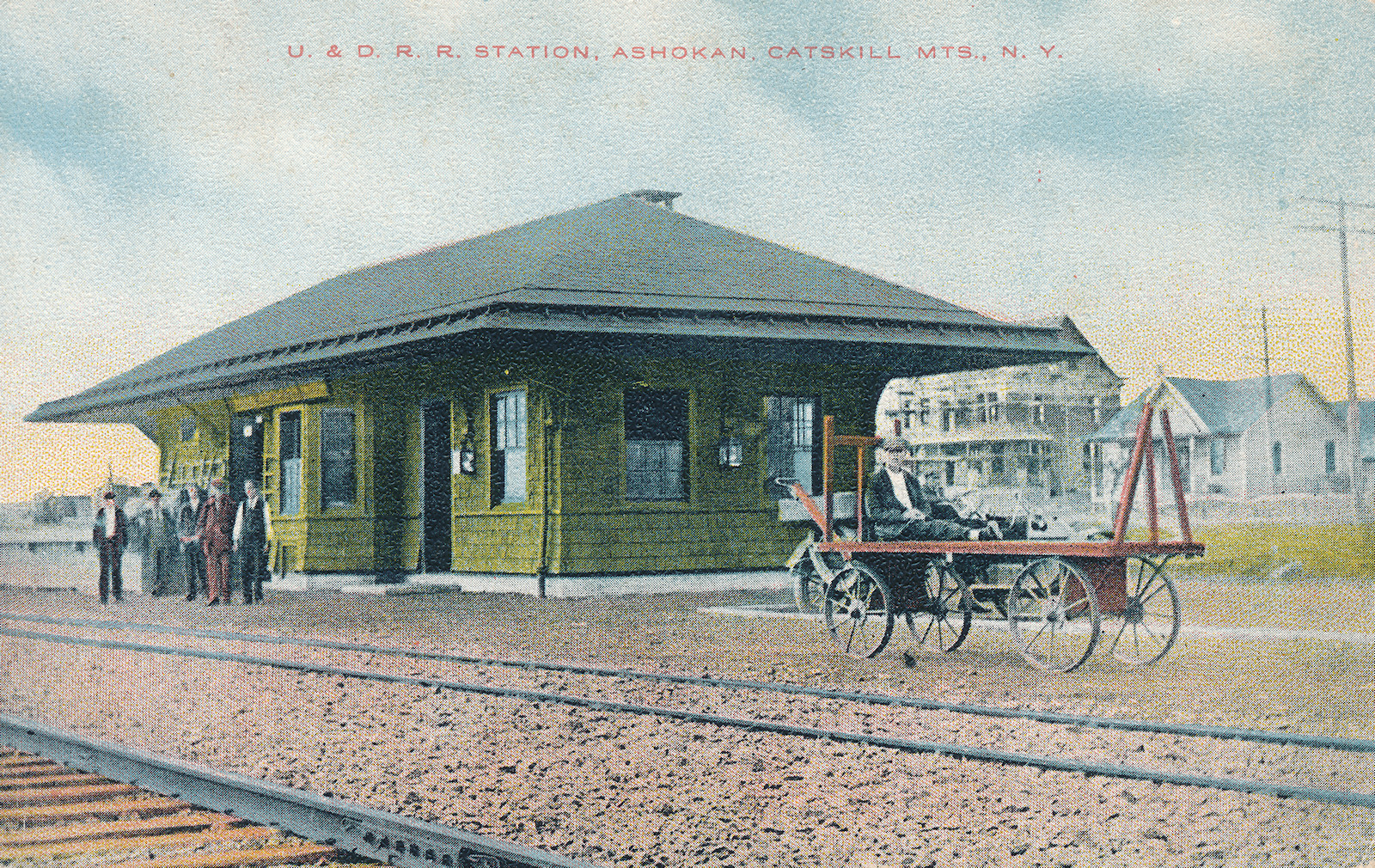
- Browns station was moved to new Ashokan site in 1913

General information
- Location: 3055 New York State Route 28, Shokan, Olive, New York 12481
- Tracks: 1

Other information
- Status: Relocated to Woodstock village

History
- Opened: June 8, 1913
- Closed: March 31, 1954

Services
Preceding station	New York Central Railroad	Following station
Cold Brook toward Oneonta	Catskill Mountain Branch	West Hurley toward Kingston Point
Location

Ashokan was a former railroad station located in the Shokan section of the town of Olive, Ulster County, New York, United States. Located 16.2 miles (26.1 km) from the terminus at Kingston Point in Kingston, it was located along the Ulster and Delaware Railroad, later the Catskill Mountain Branch of the New York Central Railroad. The station opened on June 8, 1913, when the railroad abandoned their former alignment due to the construction of the Ashokan Reservoir. The railroad moved the station depot at Brown's Station to Ashokan for service.

The New York Central Railroad discontinued passenger service on the line on March 31, 1954. The depot was moved to Woodstock, New York in May 1970. The station site and the right-of-way is now part of the 11.5-mile-long (18.5 km) Ashokan Rail Trail, connecting West Hurley with Boiceville.
