= Kingston Point station =

Kingston Point

General information
- Location: Kingston, New York
- Coordinates: 41°55′35.47″N 73°57′44.32″W
- Tracks: 1

History
- Opened: 1868
- Closed: 1924

Services
Preceding station	New York Central Railroad	Following station
Rondout toward Oneonta	Catskill Mountain Branch	Terminus
Location

Kingston Point station, was one of the last stations built on the Ulster and Delaware Railroad (U&D). It was built in Kingston, New York, to permit passengers and cargo to be transferred between the U&D and boats transiting the Hudson River between Albany and New York. It was also adjacent to Kingston Point Park, which was an attraction in itself, and there was a nearby trolley depot.

== History ==
Ferry service across the river between Kingston and Rhinebeck began early in the 1700s. The initial location of the west dock is unclear, but by the end of the century it was located at Kingston Point, with stagecoach connection to Kingston proper. The road across the swamp to Kingston Point was frequently in poor condition. On November 11, 1852, Rondout replaced Kingston Point as the main western terminal, while a new terminal replaced two separate older docks in Rhinebeck. An older boat continued to run between Kingston Point and one of the old Rhinebeck docks for the remainder of the year, but did not resume the route when ice cleared in the spring of 1853.

Originally, U&D passengers transferred between train and ferry at Rondout station next to Rondout Creek. As boats became larger, they could no longer easily navigate the shallow and narrow waters of the Rondout Creek. In order to facilitate the connection with the larger boats, the U&D extended its rail line approximately one mile east on fill over a tidal swamp to deep water on the Hudson River.

The U&D stopped passenger service to the station in 1924. The day-liner service stopped shortly after the Great Depression. Most of the buildings in the park, including the station, were demolished. Only the trolley depot survived, though it has since been rebuilt.

The tracks to the Point were also the tail of a switchback that remained in freight service until 1977. Today the Trolley Museum of New York operates a trolley on the former U&D tracks to Kingston Point.
