= 1892 in rail transport =

This article lists events related to rail transport that occurred in 1892.

== Events ==
=== January events ===
- January 28 – California Southern Railroad abandons the section of railroad through Temecula Canyon connecting to Fallbrook.

=== February events ===
- February 4 – Strahan–Zeehan Railway in Tasmania opens.

=== March events ===
- March 1 – Japan's Mito Railway is consolidated into the Japanese National Railways.

=== April events ===
- April 17 – Canada Atlantic Railway leases the Central Counties Railway, which connected Glen Robertson and Hawkesbury, Ontario.
- April 25 – Mount Dundas – Zeehan Railway in Tasmania opens.

=== May events ===
- May 20 – The last broad gauge train runs on the Great Western Railway main line out of London Paddington station. Over the following two days 177 route miles (285 km) of its line are converted to standard gauge.

=== June events ===
- June 6 – The Chicago 'L' begins operations. The South Side Elevated Railroad opens for service between Old Congress terminal in downtown Chicago and 39th Street (Pershing Road), a distance of 3.6 miles. Originally, this pioneering "High Line" used 46 small 0-4-4T Forney steam locomotives built by Baldwin Locomotive Works of Philadelphia, Pennsylvania hauling 180 wooden trailers built by Jackson and Sharp Company of Wilmington, Delaware.
- June 7 – Homer Plessy is arrested when he refuses to move from a seat reserved for whites on a train in New Orleans. The case will lead to the U.S. Supreme Court's landmark "separate but equal" decision in Plessy v. Ferguson in 1896.
- June 9 – Two trains collide at Esholt Junction in West Yorkshire, England, on what is now the Wharfedale Line. Five passengers are killed, twenty-six more and three crew are injured. The cause is unsafe procedures and a signal obscured by vegetation.
- June 17 – Brienz Rothorn Bahn, in Switzerland, opens.

=== July events ===
- July 2 – the Chemin de fer Glion-Rochers-de-Naye opens the first section of the Montreux–Glion–Rochers-de-Naye railway line in Switzerland.
- July 18 – The Pine Bluff, Monroe and New Orleans Railroad is reorganized as the Pine Bluff and Eastern Railroad (a Cotton Belt predecessor).
- July 25 – Tramway de Pithiviers à Toury opened in France.

=== August events ===
- August 4 – Narrow gauge funicular Otis Elevating Railway opens to carry passengers from Catskill Mountain Railway trains connecting with Hudson River steamboats to the Catskill Mountain House destination resort and the Catskill and Tannersville Railway.
- August 29 – The South Side Elevated Railroad in Chicago is extended south of 39th Street and reaches Garfield Boulevard in Washington Park.

=== September events ===
- September – Hotchkiss Bicycle Railroad opens from Mount Holly to Smithville, New Jersey.
- September 12 – Western Maryland Railroad's line from Hagerstown, Maryland, over the Chesapeake and Ohio Canal and the Potomac River to Cherry Run, West Virginia, opens.
- September 26 – Jaffa–Jerusalem railway opened in the Ottoman Mutasarrifate of Jerusalem.

=== November events ===
- November 24 – First section of Philippine National Railways opens.
- November 27 – The Atchison, Topeka and Santa Fe Railway inaugurates the California Limited passenger train between Chicago, Illinois, and Los Angeles, with the first departure from Chicago.

=== December events ===
- December 1 – The first California Limited passenger train arrives in Chicago, Illinois, after a round trip to Los Angeles.
- December 30 – Canadian Pacific Railway opens the line between Payne and Eganville, Ontario; the first trains on the line are excursions from Renfrew.

=== Unknown date events ===
- Charles L. Heisler receives a patent for the Heisler locomotive.
- Klien-Lindner axle patented.
- Construction of first petrol-engined locomotive, designed by Gottlieb Daimler and built in Esslingen, Germany.
- Oliver Robert Hawke Bury is appointed as chief mechanical engineer of the Great Western Railway of Brazil.
- Michigan-Peninsular Car Company, later to become part of American Car and Foundry, is founded in Detroit, Michigan.
- Muroran Main Line on Hokkaido begins life as a colliery railway.
- The Lake Superior & Ishpeming Railway Company, later to become the Lake Superior and Ishpeming Railroad, is founded.
- The Richmond and Danville Railroad enters receivership.
- Rebuilt stations opened
  - Madrid Atocha railway station, Spain, designed by Alberto Palacio with Gustave Eiffel.
  - Ramses Station, Cairo, Egypt.

== Births ==
=== October births ===
- October 26 – André Chapelon, French steam locomotive designer (d. 1978).

== Deaths ==
=== July deaths ===
- July 24 – Thomas Nickerson, president of the Atchison, Topeka and Santa Fe Railway 1874–1880 (b. 1810).

=== September deaths ===
- September 7 – Joseph R. Anderson, owner of American steam locomotive manufacturing company Tredegar Iron Works (b. 1813).

=== December deaths ===
- December 2 – Jay Gould, American financier who, with Jim Fisk, took control of the Erie Railroad (b. 1836).
- December 28 – Isaac Dripps, mechanical engineer for the Camden and Amboy Railroad who assembled the John Bull (b. 1810).
