= Historic preservation in New York =

Historic preservation in New York is activity undertaken to conserve forests, buildings, ships, sacred burial grounds, water purity and other objects of cultural importance in New York in ways that allow them to communicate meaningfully about past practices, events, and people.

Governmental programs for historic preservation range from Federal ownership and active operation of sites (such as the Statue of Liberty and Ellis Island in New York Harbor) to grants and subsidies provided by state government, municipal support of museums and interpretative displays (such as roadside plaques and town-history websites). Nonprofit programs include activities of statewide and local historical associations and museums, and activities of historical societies and museums at the national level. Quasi-governmental organizations, such as the New York State Thruway Authority and Thousand Islands Bridge Authority (which have historic sites on their property), play a role as well. Private endeavors, such as investment and other choices made by private landowners to conserve historical features of their properties, are significant but less visible and include groups such as the Historic Districts Council, The New York Landmarks Conservancy and the Preservation League of New York State.

== Federal programs ==
Federal programs include National Park Service areas, the National Register of Historic Places (including its tax subsidies) and the National Historic Landmark program.

=== National Park Service areas ===
New York has no National Parks, but there are 20 other National Park Service areas that primarily protect historical sites. These provide the highest degree of conservation provided by the Federal government.

There are five National Monuments:

- African Burial Ground National Monument, declared February 27, 2006, (also a National Historic Landmark)
- Castle Clinton National Monument, declared August 12, 1946 (also an NHL)
- Fort Stanwix National Monument, declared August 21, 1935 (also an NHL)
- Governors Island National Monument, declared January 19, 2001 (also an NHL)
- Statue of Liberty National Monument, declared October 15, 1924 (shared with New Jersey)

There are two National Historical Parks:

- Saratoga National Historical Park
- Women's Rights National Historical Park

There are eight National Historic Sites:

- Eleanor Roosevelt National Historic Site
- Home of Franklin D. Roosevelt National Historic Site
- Martin Van Buren National Historic Site
- Sagamore Hill National Historic Site
- Saint Paul's Church National Historic Site
- Theodore Roosevelt Birthplace National Historic Site
- Theodore Roosevelt Inaugural National Historic Site
- Vanderbilt Mansion National Historic Site

There are three National Memorials:

- Federal Hall National Memorial
- General Grant National Memorial
- Hamilton Grange National Memorial (also an NHL)

There are also two National Historic Site "associated areas", which receive National Park Service support but are not administered by the NPS:

- Lower East Side Tenement National Historic Site (also an NHL)
- Thomas Cole National Historic Site (also an NHL)

=== National Historic Landmarks ===
The National Historic Landmark program has designated 257 landmarks in New York, which is more than 10% of all NHLs in the United States. Seven of these are also National Park Service areas.

=== Registered Historic Places ===
There are over 5,000 properties and districts listed on the National Register of Historic Places in New York. These include all of the historic NPS areas listed above, and all of the NHLs.

== State programs ==
New York State programs include State Historic Sites and state-listed historic sites.

=== State Historic Sites ===
There are 38 State Historic Sites; 23 of these are also NHLs. All the NHLs (and some of the others) are also NRHP-listed. The state historic sites are:

- Bennington Battlefield State Historic Site (Bennington Battlefield NHL)
- Caumsett State Historic Park
- Clermont State Historic Site (Clermont Manor NHL)
- Clinton House State Historic Site
- Crailo State Historic Site (Fort Crailo NHL)
- Crown Point State Historic Site (Fort Crown Point NHL and Fort Frederic NHL)
- Darwin Martin House State Historic Site (Darwin D. Martin House NHL)
- Fort Montgomery State Historic Site (Fort Montgomery NHL)
- Fort Ontario State Historic Site
- Ganondagan State Historic Site (Boughton Hill NHL)
- Grant Cottage State Historic Site
- Herkimer Home State Historic Site
- Hyde Hall State Historic (Hyde Hall NHL)
- Jay Heritage Center
- John Brown Farm State Historic Site (John Brown Farm and Gravesite NHL)
- John Burroughs Memorial State Historic Site (Woodchuck Lodge NHL)
- John Jay State Historic Site (John Jay House NHL)
- Johnson Hall State Historic Site (Johnson Hall NHL)
- Knox's Headquarters State Historic Site (Knox Headquarters NHL)
- Lorenzo State Historic Site
- New Windsor Cantonment State Historic Site
- Olana State Historic Site (Frederic Church House NHL)
- Old Croton Aqueduct State Historic Park (Old Croton Aqueduct NHL)
- Old Erie Canal State Historic Park
- Old Fort Niagara State Historic Site (Fort Niagara NHL)
- Oriskany Battlefield State Historic Site (Oriskany Battlefield NHL)
- Philipse Manor State Historic Site (Philipse Manor NHL)
- Planting Fields Arboretum State Historic Park -- Coe Hall Historic House Museum
- Sackets Harbor Battlefield State Historic Site
- Schoharie Crossing State Historic Site (Erie Canal NHL)
- Schuyler Mansion State Historic Site (Schuyler Mansion NHL)
- Senate House State Historic Site
- Sonnenberg Gardens & Mansion State Historic Park
- Staatsburgh State Historic Site
- Steuben Memorial State Historic Site
- Stony Point Battlefield State Historic Site (Stony Point Battlefield NHL)
- Walt Whitman Birthplace State Historic Site
- Washington's Headquarters State Historic Site (Washington's Headquarters NHL)

=== State-listed historic sites ===
The state Department of Historic Preservation – within the New York State Office of Parks and Recreation—Historical Preservation (NYSOPRHP) – is heavily involved in evaluating candidates for NRHP listings. Sites are given a state listing first, and some are then nominated for a Federal listing; thus, sites may receive a state but not a Federal listing. Owners of sites may opt out of a Federal listing, but may not be able to opt out of state listing.

== New York City programs ==
The New York City Landmarks Preservation Commission was founded (after the demolition of the original Penn Station building) to identify and preserve landmarks in New York City.

== Quasi-governmental organizations ==
The Thousand Islands Bridge Authority acquired Boldt Castle on Heart Island and its nearby yacht house for one dollar in 1977, under an agreement that all revenue obtained would be used to preserve the castle. The George C. Boldt Yacht House is on the National Register of Historic Places. The New York State Thruway Authority subsidizes the preservation of the New York State Barge Canal.

== Archeological investigations ==
The African Burial Ground (the latest National Monument in New York) was discovered during construction activities in downtown New York City. Road-construction projects are required to have subcontractors who investigate sites for archeological importance (Indian remains, for example). Archeological sites are sometimes preserved in secrecy, although some are pilfered by amateur archeologists. It is National Park Service policy to conceal the location of sensitive archeological sites by withholding location information on NRHP documents (or withholding NRHP documents altogether from the public).

== Historical societies ==
- New York State Historical Association: Reported assets of $53.237 million on June 30, 2005, and took in revenues of $6.216 million in FY 2005
- American Irish Historical Society: located on Fifth Avenue in New York City, opposite Metropolitan Museum of Art
- American Jewish Historical Society: 15 West 16th Street, New York, NY
- Briarcliff Manor-Scarborough Historical Society: Briarcliff Manor Public Library at 1 Library Road, Briarcliff Manor, NY
- Brooklyn Historical Society: Reported assets of $21.783 million on June 30, 2006, and took in revenues of $1.889 million in FY 2006
- Broome County Historical Society: focus on industrial development
- Bronx County Historical Society: Reported assets of $1.187 million on June 30, 2006, and took in revenues of $655 thousand in FY 2006
- Brunswick Historical Society: Town of Brunswick and Rensselaer County
- Buffalo History Museum: one of the oldest regional historical societies in the U.S.; its first president was U.S. President Millard Fillmore.
- Camillus Historical Society: located in an NRHP site, the Wilcox Octagon House
- Canal Society of New York State
- Cayuga-Owasco Lakes Historical Society: founded in 1966 to preserve the history of the 12 towns south of Auburn
- Preservation Association of Central New York
- Clinton Historical Society: Town of Clinton (in Oneida County) and surrounding area
- Cohocton Historical Society: Town of Cohocton (Steuben County) and vicinity
- Columbia County Historical Society: owns and operates three historic properties (open to the public during the summer season) and a museum (open year-round)
- Dewitt Historical Society of Tompkins County: collections from prehistory to present
- Franklin County Historical and Museum Society: Victorian furnishings, early craft exhibits, genealogy service
- Fort Brewerton Historical Society: French and Indian War site with reconstructed post-Revolutionary War blockhouse museum
- Geneva Historical Society: operates several historical houses, including Rose Hill and the Prouty-Chew House. Has 1,300 cubic feet (37 m^{3}) of archives, 30,000 photographic images, furniture, decorative art, costumes, textiles, fine art, tools and equipment, and four historic properties
- Goshen Public Library and Historical Society: Elizabeth Sharts Historical and Genealogical Reference Room houses over 40,000 manuscripts and documents, newspapers, maps, books and pamphlets
- Greene County Historical Society: Catskills heritage, preservation of local historical structures and sites
- Greene County Mountain Top Historical Society: focus on "Mountain Top" portion of Catskills through art, literature, history, culture, folklore, legends and environment
- Herkimer County Historical Society
- Hispanic Society of America: Spanish, Portuguese, and Latin American art and artifacts and rare-books and manuscripts-research libraries. Founded in 1904 by Archer Milton Huntington, the museum is free and open to the public in a Beaux Arts building on Audubon Terrace at 155th Street in Washington Heights, Manhattan.
- Historic Albany Foundation: focus on restoration and rehabilitation of historic buildings; includes architectural-parts warehouse and online catalogue
- Historical Society For the Preservation of the Underground Railroad
- Huguenot Historical Society (New Paltz): owns and operates National Historic Landmark District, Huguenot Street, a collection of house museums with construction dates ranging from 1690 to 1894
- Huntington Historical Society: maintains three National Register historic properties (as two house museums), resource center and archive
- Italian Historical Society of America (Brooklyn): preserves biographical and other material relating to people of Italian lineage, publishes documents and reports, maintains cultural center, administers scholarships and fellowships
- Irvington Historical Society: 131 Main Street, Irvington, NY
- Jordan Historical Society: operates Jordan Canal Museum
- Klyne Esopus Historical Society Museum (Ulster Park): local history from 1608–present; collection includes family genealogies, cemetery records, church records, census records, house and locality records and maps
- Lancaster New York Historical Society: membership application and copies of newsletter (The Lancaster Legend) from 40 Clark Street, Lancaster, NY 14088, (716) 681-7718
- Livingston County Historical Society
- Lynbrook Historical and Preservation Society: education and preserving the history of Lynbrook (formerly Pearsall's Corners)
- Manlius Historical Society: operates a museum; dedicated to preserve history and heritage of Central New York, emphasizing Manlius
- Marcellus Historical Society: since 1960 has preserved artifacts, history and records of town and village, displaying its collection in a historic mansion
- Medina Historical Society: newsletter, holiday open house, school tours, historic home and garden tour, book on Medina history
- Minisink Valley Historical Society: information about Minisink region
- Mohawk and Hudson Chapter of the National Railway Historical Society
- Morningside Heights Historic District Committee, New York City dedicated to advocating for and protecting the architectures of Morningside Heights, Manhattanville, and Hamilton Heights in Upper Manhattan.
- Nanticoke Valley Historical Society (Maine: collects valley history; Nanticoke Creek flows south through a valley that extends from near Whitney Point to the Susquehanna River in Union. Nanticoke Creek and valley were named after an American Indian tribe that once lived in the area.
- National Maritime Historical Society: covers maritime history and seafaring (including art, literature, and culture of the sea), sail training, ship saving, maritime museums and events
- Newark Valley Historical Society: operates Bement-Billings Farmstead and Newark Valley Railroad Depot; P. O. Box 222, Newark Valley, NY 13811 tel (607) 642-9516
- New Castle Historical Society
- New York Central Historical Society: membership includes former NYC and subsidiary-line employees, rail historians, students of railroad engineering and railroad modelers
- New York Correction History Society: histories of DOC institutions and their role in New York State and American history
- New York Covered Bridge Society: founded in 1966 to preserve historic covered spans, to work with local communities interested in saving bridges, to collect information on New York State covered bridges and to make historical information available to its members
- New-York Historical Society: museum collections and exhibitions, research library, archive and print room, programs and store
- Newstead Historical Society: 145 Main Street, Akron, NY 14004
- Niagara County Historical Society: maintains Outwater Memorial Building, Niagara County Genealogical Society, Pioneer and Transportation Building, Firehouse, Yates Farm Barn, Washington Hunt Building, Colonel William Bond House and Hille House
- Northport Historical Society and Museum: museum events and programs, a "kids' corner", teacher resources, timeline and other historical information on Northport and its environs (including East Northport, Fort Salonga, Asharoken and Eatons Neck)
- Oneida County Historical Society: 1608 Genesee St, Utica, NY 13502
- Onondaga Historical Association (Syracuse): genealogy, architecture, industrial and transportation history
- Ontario County Historical Society: founded in Canandaigua in the late 1800s by Charles Miliken (editor of a local newspaper, the Ontario County Times)
- Ontario and Western Railway Historical Society: dedicated to preserving the heritage of the New York, Ontario and Western Railway
- Ossining Historical Society: organized in 1931 to educate the public in the history and traditions of Ossining-on-Hudson and vicinity
- Oswego Town Historical Society: website includes genealogical research application
- Oyster Bay Historical Society: provides craft exhibits, lectures, maps, photos, historical and genealogical documents; headquartered in the Earle-Wightman House museum and library
- Photographic Historical Society (Rochester): history of photography
- Town of Pompey Historical Society
- Queens Historical Society: museum and local history research center (library and archive), headquartered in historic site (Kingsland Homestead); colonial farmhouse history through exhibitions, house and walking tours, and educational programs
- Rensselaer County Historical Society: established in 1927 to connect local history and heritage with contemporary life
- Richmond Hill Historical Society: educational programs and historic house tours
- Rockland County Historical Society: operates Jacob Blauvelt House and History Museum Center
- Rome Historical Society: museum, William E. Scripture Memorial Library, archive and artifacts
- Roosevelt Island Historical Society: preserves the island's history through educational projects, lectures, tours, exhibits and community outreach; restores and preserves landmark structures on the island; collects and maintains archive of written material and memorabilia
- Roslyn Landmark Society: founded in 1961 and serves the Greater Roslyn area of Nassau County (anchored by Roslyn); maintains covenants on 36 properties and maintains extensive programming, museums, and infrastructure
- Rye Historical Society: operates two historical houses: The Square House (c. 1730), an interpretive tavern house and the Knapp House (c. 1670), with library and archive
- St. Lawrence County Historical Association: preserves county history and operates museum and archive in the country Greek-Revival house originally belonging to Silas Wright, Governor of New York from 1845 to 1846
- Sag Harbor Historical Society, Sag Harbor, New York houses a period Whaler's shop and 600 paintings of Annie Cooper Boyd.
- Saratoga Springs History Museum: permanent and temporary exhibits documenting the resort community's history; emphasis on spa, gambling, hotel and ethnic history
- Saratoga County Historical Society: operates Brookside Museum
- Schaghticoke Knickerbocker Historical Society
- Scarsdale Historical Society: exhibitions, lectures, meetings and educational programs
- Schenectady County Historical Society: history, genealogy, library and Jan Mabee Farm
- Schoharie County Historical Society: history and genealogy of Schoharie County
- Sharon Historical Society: founded 1971; dedicated to preserving Sharon's history, operating Sharon Historical Museum and Chestnut Street School
- Shelter Island Historical Society
- Skaneateles Historical Society: museum and nonprofit volunteer organization dedicated to preserving Skaneateles' history. Website has data from St. Mary's gravestones, Lakeview Cemetery, 19th-century newspapers and family files from Society archives
- Smithfield Community Association: not-for-profit organization preserving historic buildings and properties in Peterboro
- Solvay-Geddes Historical Society: founded 2005
- Spafford Area Historical Society
- Staten Island Historical Society: operates Historic Richmond Town – an authentic village, museum complex and archive. Many buildings have been restored and are open to the public.
- Sullivan County Historical Society: history and genealogy
- Three Village Area: focus on the North Shore of Long Island
- Tioga County Historical Society: collects and preserves artifacts, operates a museum, educational programs and publishing
- Thomas Paine National Historical Association: founded January 29, 1884, in New York City to commemorate life and works of Thomas Paine and ensure Paine's place in history as a founder of the United States
- Tonawanda Kenmore Historical Society: founded 1849
- Tully Area Historical Society: organized in 1977 to preserve two historic churches; features bookstore and exhibit hall
- Ulster & Delaware Railroad Historical Society: focuses on Catskills and Hudson Valley railroad history (including the U&D and Delaware and Northern Railroads and the Catskill Mountain, Catskill and Tannersville and Otis Elevating Railways)
- Underground Railroad History Project of the Capital Region, Inc.: an effort to research, identify, celebrate and preserve Underground Railroad history in the Capital District
- Vestal Historical Society and Museum: discovers and collects material illustrating history of Vestal and surrounding areas
- Westchester County Historical Society: library and research center founded in 1874
- Western New York Railway Historical Society: preserving Western New York's railroad heritage through restoration projects and other events
- White Plains Historical Society
- Yates County Genealogical & Historical Society (Oliver House, Penn Yan): museum to discover, preserve and interpret county history, to collect materials and objects relating to county history, and to plan exhibits relating to local history
- Yorktown Historical Society

In addition, state and university libraries preserve books, papers, and other artifacts.

=== Town historians and histories ===
Many towns have history websites - for example, the village of Elbridge. The Village of North Syracuse history website claims a U.S. first in its town: "The first plank road in the United States was finished and ready for travel on July 18, 1846. The road cost $23,000, was 16½ miles long and planked its entire length".

The Onondaga County Sheriff's Office history (unusual for an organization "proudly serving since 1794") traces its history back to 450-650 AD, when Saxon sheriffs ruled in England.

== History museums ==
History museums may be independent of other entities or operated by historical societies, municipalities, or the state. For an example of the independent type, the Erie Canal Museum "is a private, nonprofit corporation founded in 1962. It is housed in the 1850 Weighlock Building, where canal boats were weighed during the days when they traveled through the center of Syracuse on the Erie Canal." The Weighlock building is listed on the National Register of Historic Places.

There is a museum operated by a town inside a covered bridge in Washington County, New York.

== Notable preservationists ==
Notable New York preservationists include:

- Michael Henry Adams (American activist, Harlem historian, writer)
- James Marston Fitch (1909–2000) American activist, architect, teacher)
- Margot Gayle (1908–2008) American activist, journalist)
- Jane Jacobs (1916–2006) American-Canadian activist, writer)
- Sergio Rossetti Morosini (1953 ) Brazilian-American Landmark Preservationist)
- Jacqueline Kennedy Onassis (1929–1994) American activist, writer)
- Halina Rosenthal (1918–1991) American activist, Upper East Side of Manhattan)
- Arlene Simon (American activist, Upper West Side of Manhattan)
- Barbaralee Diamonstein-Spielvogel (American activist, writer)
- Nancy (Boyd) Willey Sag Harbor Historian and village preservationist.
- Joan K. Davidson (1927-2023) (American activist, philanthropist)

== Theatres and other nonprofits interested in preservation ==
The Landmark Theatre (Syracuse, New York) building in Syracuse is a historic building, listed on the National Register. It is operated by a nonprofit theatre company, part of whose mission is to preserve the theatre.

== Genealogical histories ==
Some genealogical histories contain material of interest to historical preservationists.

== Bed and breakfast inns ==
A number of bed and breakfast inns are advertised as being in historic homes; some are on the NRHP. Although renovated, many preserve aspects of historic homes which would otherwise be lost. Accessibility by paying guests communicates history on a local scale, and may educate visitors to the area.

== Private homes ==
The historic character of many neighborhoods is maintained by individual homeowners.

== See also ==
- List of museums in New York
- Historic Preservation
- New York State Register of Historic Places
- New York State Historic Markers
