= Haines Falls station (disambiguation) =

Haines Falls station could refer to:

- Haines Falls station, a disused railway station in Haines Falls, New York, which was part of the Ulster and Delaware Railroad
- a railway station in Haines Falls, New York, operated by the Catskill and Tannersville Railway, which was closed in 1918
- a bus station in Tannersville, New York operated by Trailways of New York
