= Haines Falls station =

Haines Falls
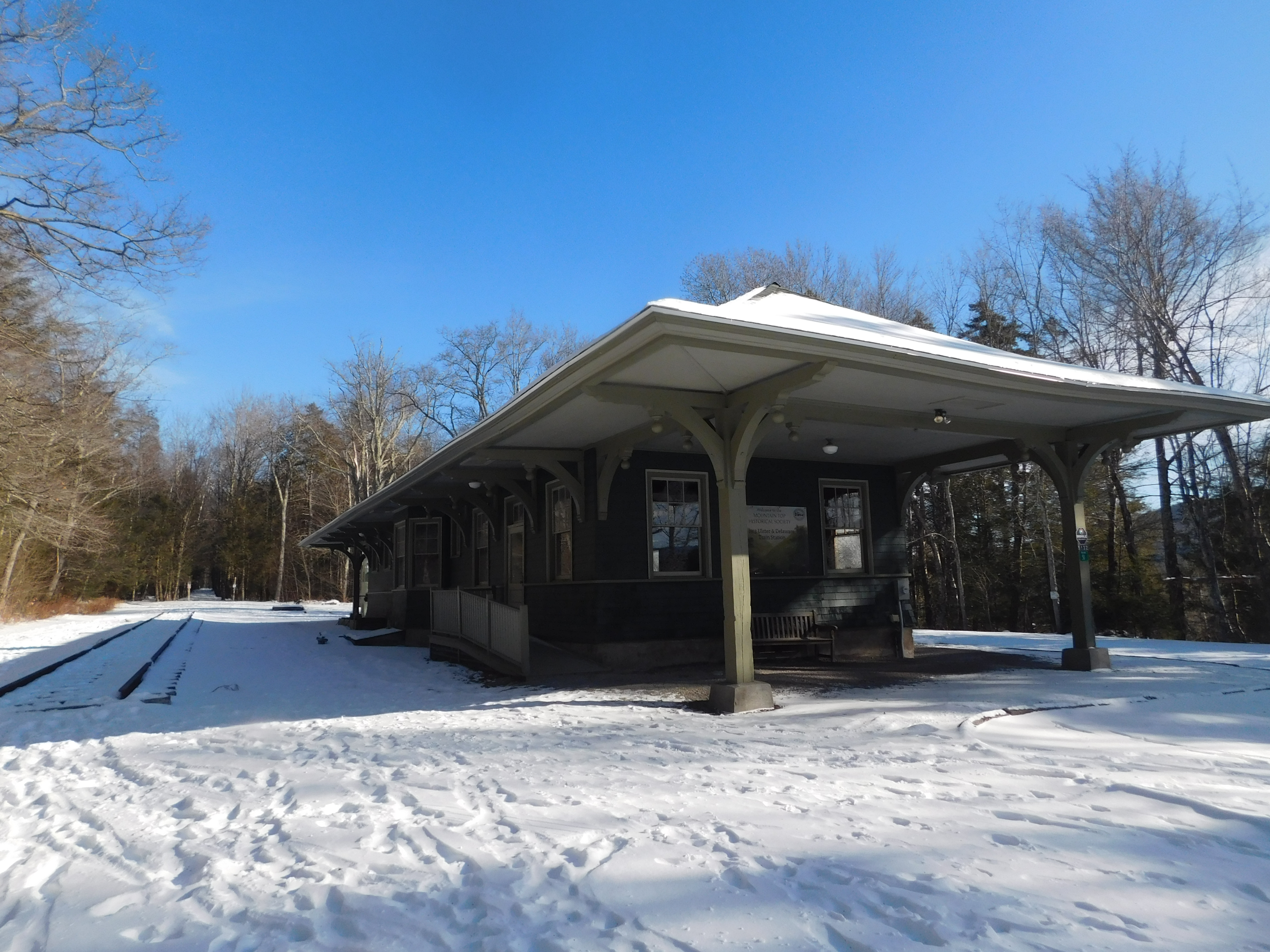
- Haines Falls station in January 2026.

General information
- Location: Railroad Station Road, Haines Falls, Greene County. New York
- Tracks: 1

History
- Opened: June 25, 1883
- Closed: January 22, 1940

Services
Preceding station	New York Central Railroad	Following station
Laurel House toward Kaaterskill	Kaaterskill Branch	Tannersville toward Phoenicia
- Ulster and Delaware Railroad Station
- U.S. National Register of Historic Places
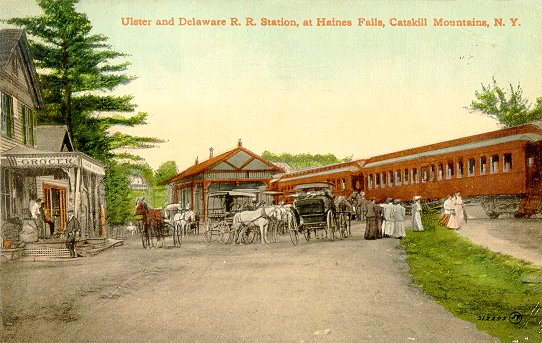
- Postcard of the former Haines Falls station

- Location within New York Location within the United States
- Location: NY 23A, Hamlet of Haines Falls, Hunter, New York
- Coordinates: 42°11′45″N 74°5′29″W
- Area: 1.5 acres (0.61 ha)
- Built: 1913
- NRHP reference No.: 96000861
- Added to NRHP: August 08, 1996
Location

Haines Falls is a defunct railroad station in the eponymous hamlet of Haines Falls, town of Hunter, Greene County, New York. Located at the end of Railroad Station Road in Haines Falls, the station served trains of the Ulster and Delaware Railroad's Kaaterskill Branch, a division of the New York Central Railroad. The station had one side platform and a wooden station depot which currently stands and serves as the headquarters of the Mountain Top Historical Society. The Kaaterskill Rail Trail passes through the station.

Railroad service on the Kaaterskill Branch began in June 25, 1883 and closed on January 22, 1940. The station depot was placed on the National Register of Historical Places in 1996.

== History ==
=== Kaaterskill Railroad ===
The station was owned by the narrow-gauge Kaaterskill Railroad, MP 6.6, and was one of the busiest stations on the line. It was called Haines Corners Station, as the town's original name was Haines Corners. It was very busy and was across from a boarding house. It was near a six-span bridge, called the Girder Deck Bridge, which was the largest structure on the railroad. It was right across from another station that was owned by another narrow-gauge railroad. The KRR station soon became a station that belonged to a standard-gauge railroad called the Ulster and Delaware, which turned the Kaaterskill Railroad into a branch, and combined it with a portion of another narrow-gauge railroad, called the Stony Clove and Catskill Mountain Railway.

=== Ulster and Delaware Railroad ===
The station, located at branch MP 18.4, wasn't changed during the period that pre-fabricated stations being erected in between the years of 1900 and 1901. However, the station was causing problems; as passenger trains grew the early 1910s, the State of New York was sending complaints that the station was too small for the town it was serving. In 1913, U&D finally gave in and tore the old station down, making way for a new one, a few hundred feet away.

This new station, branch MP 18.5, looked like the Tannersville station, but it didn't have the portico sticking out of the back. It was a full season passenger station until the New York Central purchased the U&D in 1932. This was when it became a summer-only station, with it being a flagstop in the other seasons. If a passenger were to get picked up at the station in another season, the business and income would be handled by the station agent at Tannersville.

But when the NYC was granted permission by the ICC to abandon the branches in 1939, and to scrap it in 1940, the station was abandoned. It is, at present, the headquarters of the Mountain Top Historical Society, and one of only two surviving U&D branch stations.

In 2012, the Ulster & Delaware Railroad Historical Society donated 132 feet (40 m) of 105-pound (48 kg) rail to the Mountain Top Historical Society so that a display track could be built on the former railroad right-of-way besides the station.

It was listed on the National Register of Historic Places in 1996 as the Ulster and Delaware Railroad Station.

=== Kaaterskill Rail Trail ===
In 2013, a hiking track called the Kaaterskill Rail Trail was completed. The first phase was a 1.5-mile (2.4 km) section between the Mountain Top Historical Society property and DEC land at the end of Laurel House Road. In 2016, further improvements were completed allowing visitors to travel from Haines Falls station to the North–South Lake Campground via the Rail Trail and the Escarpment Trail, with multiple views of Kaaterskill Falls accessible to the public. These upgrades also sought to improve safety at the falls, as a number of falling deaths have occurred in recent years.

== Bibliography ==
- Interstate Commerce Commission (1940). Decisions of the Interstate Commerce Commission of the United States (Finance Reports). Washington D.C.: Government Printing Office.
