= Garfield Mountain (New York) =

Mountain in New York, United States

- Location within New York Location within the United States

Highest point
- Elevation: 2,582 feet (787 m)
- Coordinates: 42°05′28″N 74°22′00″W

Geography
- Location: Allaben, New York, U.S.
- Topo map: USGS Phoenicia

Garfield Mountain is a mountain located in the Catskill Mountains of New York south of Allaben. Fork Ridge is located south, Sheridan Mountain is located east-northeast, and Romer Mountain is located southeast of Garfield Mountain.
