= Tannersville station =

Tannersville station may refer to:

- Tannersville station (New York), a disused station in Tannersville, New York, which was part of the Ulster and Delaware Railroad
- a station in Tannersville, New York, operated by the Catskill and Tannersville Railway, which was closed in 1918
- Tannersville station (Pennsylvania), a disused station in Tannersville, Pennsylvania
