= Samuels Point =

Mountain in New York, United States

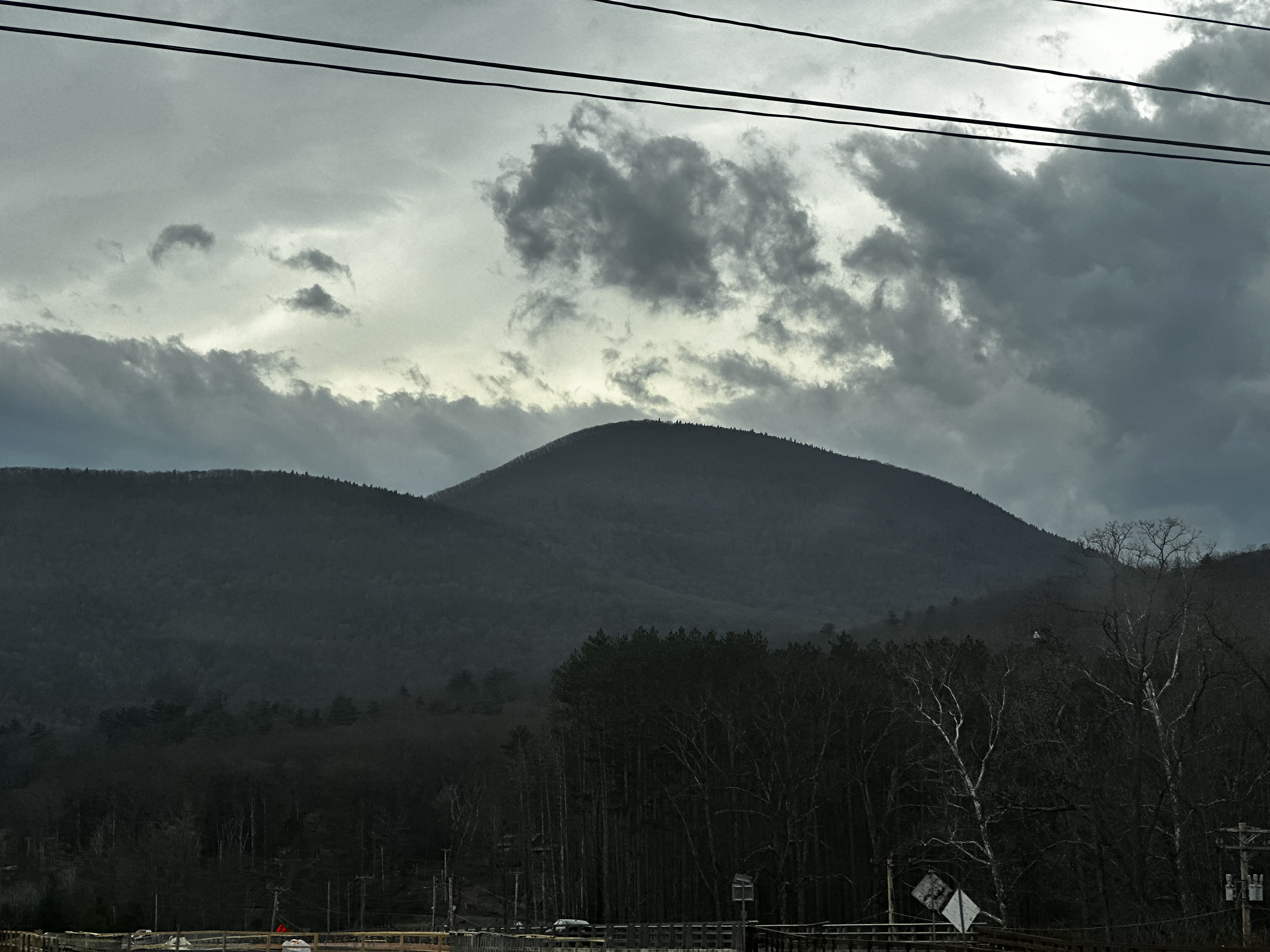
- Samuels Point from New York State Route 28

Highest point
- Elevation: 2,457 feet (749 m)
- Coordinates: 41°59′46″N 74°18′30″W

Geography
- Location within New York Location within the United States
- Location: Olivebridge, New York, U.S.
- Topo map: USGS West Shokan

Samuels Point is a cliff located in the Catskill Mountains of New York west-northwest of Olivebridge. Mount Pleasant is located north, and South Mountain is located south-southeast of Samuels Point.
