= Ulster & Delaware Railroad Historical Society =

Chapter of National Railway Historical Society focusing on Catskill and Hudson Valley

Coordinates: 42°17′41″N 74°34′30″W

The Ulster & Delaware Railroad Historical Society is a chapter of the National Railway Historical Society (NRHS). It focuses on the history of the railroads and related social, economic, and cultural institutions of the Catskill and Hudson Valley regions. That history, which began with the charter of the Catskill & Ithaca Railroad in 1828, encompasses numerous proposed and built railroads and trolley lines within Ulster, Delaware, Greene, Schoharie, Albany and Otsego counties.

== Historical focus ==
- Ulster and Delaware Railroad
- Delaware and Eastern Railroad/Delaware and Northern Railroad
- Wallkill Valley Railroad
- Catskill Mountain Railway
- Rondout and Oswego Railroad
- New York, Kingston and Syracuse Railroad
- Stony Clove & Catskill Mountain Railroad
- Kaaterskill Railroad
- Hobart Branch Railroad
- Delaware and Otsego Railroad
- Catskill Mountain Branch of the New York Central and of Penn Central
- Canajoharie and Catskill Railroad
- Cairo Railroad
- Catskill and Tannersville Railway
- Otis Elevating Railway
- Cooperstown and Charlotte Valley Railroad
- Middleburgh and Schoharie Railroad
- Schoharie Valley Railroad
- Rhinebeck and Connecticut Railroad
- Delaware and Hudson Railroad at and around Oneonta
- New York Central Railroad/West Shore Railroad at Kingston

== Preservation activities ==
In Roxbury, New York, the Roxbury Railroad Station is owned by the Society and is being restored. The society has opened the Roxbury Depot Museum in the depot, showcasing many artifacts and displays from the railroads mentioned above.

The society owns and is in the process of restoring: former NYO&W "Bobber" Caboose #8206, built at the NYO&W Middletown Shops in 1906; and former Brooklyn East District Terminal #14, a H. K. Porter, Inc Locomotive Works 0-6-0T steam locomotive, built in August 1920 at their facility in Pittsburgh, Pennsylvania. Both are currently stored in the Delaware and Ulster Railroad yards in Arkville, New York.
