= Mount Pleasant (Ulster County, New York) =

Mountain in New York, United States

- Location within New York Location within the United States

Highest point
- Elevation: 2,812 feet (857 m)
- Coordinates: 42°02′03″N 74°18′30″W

Geography
- Location: Olivebridge, New York, U.S.
- Topo map: USGS Phoenicia

Mount Pleasant is a mountain located in the Catskill Mountains of New York state, USA, northwest of Olivebridge. Cross Mountain is located southwest and Romer Mountain is located north-northwest of Mount Pleasant.
