= Cross Mountain (Ulster County, New York) =

Mountain in New York, United States

- Location within New York Location within the United States

Highest point
- Elevation: 2,503 feet (763 m)
- Coordinates: 42°01′10″N 74°19′00″W

Geography
- Location: Phoenicia, New York, U.S.
- Topo map: USGS Phoenicia

Cross Mountain is a mountain located in the Catskill Mountains of New York south of Phoenicia. Sheridan Mountain is located north, Terrace Mountain is located west, and Romer Mountain is located north of Cross Mountain.
