= Terrace Mountain (New York) =

Mountain in New York, United States

- Location within New York Location within the United States

Highest point
- Elevation: 2,365 feet (721 m)
- Coordinates: 42°01′39″N 74°20′11″W

Geography
- Location: Phoenicia, New York, U.S.
- Topo map: USGS Phoenicia

Terrace Mountain is a mountain located in the Catskill Mountains of New York south-southwest of Phoenicia. Wittenberg Mountain is located southwest, Fork Ridge is located west-northwest, and Cross Mountain is located east of Terrace Mountain.
