= Mountain Top Arboretum =

Arboretum in Tannersville, New York, US

Coordinates: 42°13′21.2″N 74°08′01.2″W

- Interactive map of Mountain Top Arboretum
- Type: Arboretum
- Location: Tannersville, New York
- Area: 200 acres (81 ha)
- Elevation: 2,400 feet
- Website: www.mtarboretum.org

Mountain Top Arboretum (200 acres), located in the Catskill Mountains in Tannersville, New York, is a public garden dedicated to displaying and managing native plant communities of the northeastern United States, in addition to curating its collection of cold-hardy native and exotic trees.

Its mountain top elevation of 2,400 feet at the top of the New York City Watershed creates a unique environment for education, research and pure enjoyment of the spectacular and historic Catskills landscape. The Arboretum trails and boardwalks connect 200 acres of plant collections, meadows, wetlands, forest and Devonian bedrock—a natural sanctuary for visitors interested in horticulture, birding, geology, local craftsmanship, hiking and snowshoeing.

Its founders, the Ahrens family, designed and planted a seven-acre mountain top area starting in 1977, to display the range of native and exotic trees and shrubs that successfully adapt to the rigorous climate at 2,400 feet elevation. There are twenty three acres of displays in three distinct areas: the West Meadow, the Woodland Walk, and the East Meadow, and a 163-acre wild forest and wetland area called Spruce Glen which has trails along a fen, bogs, old growth hemlocks and mixed hardwood forest. The Arboretum is home to a wide range of mammals and amphibians. Over 70 species of birds can be seen and heard throughout the various habitats found throughout the Arboretum.

The Arboretum currently contains 50 species of conifers, and many species of oak, maple, rowan, hawthorn, Rhododendron, Kalmia, and wildflowers. Other plantings include Turkish Fir, weeping katsura, Japanese Larch, Dawn Redwood, Bald cypress, Incense-cedar, Rocky Mountains Bristlecone Pine, goldenseal, ginseng, maidenhair fern, Hepatica, blue cohosh, flowering crabapples, fantail pussy willows, ash, viburnum, lilac, fringe tree, Fothergilla, daylilies, Clethra, Stewartia, bottlebrush buckeye, American holly, beeches and bayberry.

== See also ==
- List of botanical gardens in the United States
