= Tannersville Main Street Historic District =

Historic district in New York, United States

- U.S. National Register of Historic Places
- U.S. Historic district
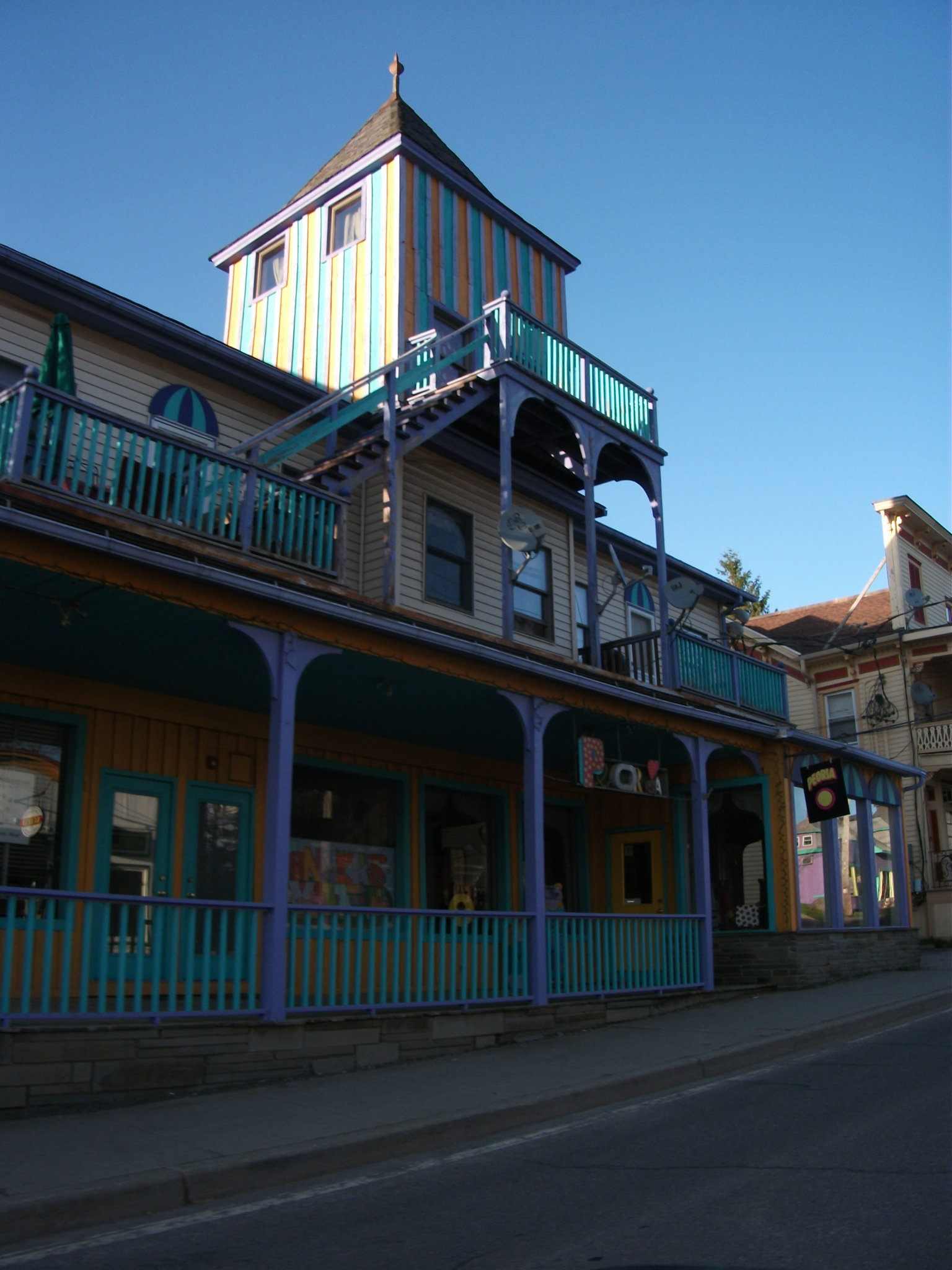
- Tannersville Main Street Historic District, May 2011

- Location within New York Location within the United States
- Location: 5898-6144 Main St., 10 Spring St., Tannersville, New York
- Coordinates: 42°11′44.66″N 74°7′39.69″W
- Area: 51 acres (21 ha)
- Built: 1870
- Architectural style: Late Victorian, Art Deco
- NRHP reference No.: 08001047
- Added to NRHP: November 14, 2008

Tannersville Main Street Historic District is a national historic district located at Tannersville in Greene County, New York. The district contains 70 contributing buildings.

It was listed on the National Register of Historic Places in 2008.
