= Michael P. Hein =

American politician

Commissioner of the New York State Office of Temporary and Disability Assistance
- In office June 4, 2019 – October 8, 2021; Acting: February 11, 2019 – June 4, 2019
- Governor: Andrew Cuomo; Kathy Hochul
- Preceded by: Samuel D. Roberts

1st County Executive of Ulster County
- In office January 1, 2009 – February 10, 2019
- Preceded by: Position established
- Succeeded by: Adele Reiter (acting); Pat Ryan

Ulster County Administrator
- In office June 14, 2006 – December 31, 2008
- Preceded by: Arthur Smith
- Succeeded by: Position abolished

Deputy Treasurer of Ulster County
- In office 2003–2006

Personal details
- Born: July 20, 1965 (age 61) Esopus, New York, U.S.
- Party: Democratic (2005–present)
- Other political affiliations: Republican (before 2005)
- Spouse: Christine Hein
- Education: Eckerd College (BA)

Michael P. Hein (born July 20, 1965) is an American politician who served as the first executive of Ulster County, serving until February 10, 2019 after having first been elected on November 4, 2008. Prior to the creation of this position, the 2008 ratification by referendum of the Ulster County Charter, Hein was the Ulster County Administrator.

== Early life, education and career ==
Hein was reared by his parents on their farm in Esopus, New York and attended school in New Pamltz. In 1987, he received a Bachelor of Arts in business administration with a special emphasis in anagement from Eckerd College.

== Political career ==
Hein became the deputy treasurer of Ulster County in 2003, and was appointed as county administrator in 2006. The duties of that position have since been shifted to the purview of the county executive, a position which came into being in 2006 due to the passage of the first county charter. Hein was elected to the position and assumed office in January 2009.

Hein cut spending by $6 million, through attrition and privatization, and provided a 0% tax increase for 2011 He has also promoted tourism initiatives in the county.

=== Clash with New York City officials ===
In the fall of 2010, the New York City Department of Environment Protection began releasing turbid water from the Ashokan Reservoir via a waste channel which feeds into Ulster County's Esopus Creek, which became contaminated with turbid water causing major problems to local farmers and residents as well as potentially damaging the aquatic ecosystem. This action by the agency which oversees the watershed feeding New York City's drinking water drew the attention of environmental groups and Ulster County residents, as well as that of Hein and many other local leaders.

On Tuesday January 12, 2010, after 97 days of contaminated releases into the Esopus Creek, Hein announced the intention to file a lawsuit against New York City DEP on behalf of the county. After enlisting the help of the New York State Department of Environmental Conservation and the New York State Attorney General's office, Hein brought an end to these releases and forced New York City DEP to pay for an independent damage assessment in order to evaluate the impact of the releases.

=== Catskill Mountain Railroad ===
In October 2013, Hein included in his budget an amount totaling $642,000 that was to be earned by taking up tracks in an unused section of an almost 40-mile-long corridor leased to a local tourist train company, the Catskill Mountain Railroad. Later, Hein suggested that much of the corridor be converted to a rail trail while preserving segments for continued tourist train operations In response, the railroad volunteers created a plan calling for both rail and trail throughout in the former Ulster and Delaware Railroad. In 2013, Ulster County issued the tourism train a notice to cure, citing lease violations. The lease with the tourism train was supposed to end in May 2016, and Hein was working with the Ulster County legislature and other entities to prepare for future uses of the corridor.

In the summer of 2016, it was announced that the Catskill Mountain Railroad would be allowed to continue its operations between Kingston and Hurley, as well as Phoenicia and Boiceville. In late 2016, Hein denied the railroad the right to operate out of Phoenicia, and county officials made that portion of the line available to the highest bidder shortly thereafter. The railroad bid for another lease on the line but Rail Explorers Inc. came in higher and was allowed to restore and operate the line with their rail-based bicycle system.

Rail Explorers had put very little effort into restoring the line early on and missed their 2017 opening date, reportedly they will begin operating the line after Memorial Day 2018. Many local communities were in disagreement the actions of county and Rail Explorers officials. One point of argument was the proposed parking lot and bus turn around in the small residential village of Cold Brook. Many residents feared that riders may wonder throughout the neighborhood, trespass and damage private property, while waiting for a bus to arrive and pick them up to return them to Phoenicia, the Rail Explorer's base of operations.

The Catskill Mountain Railroad had a large amount of its equipment stored in Phoenicia, much of it on county-owned rail, reportedly leading to a lawsuit for not removing the equipment. In January 2018, county officials oversaw the removal of a large portion of the line along the Ashokan Reservoir. According to local sources, they removed the rail, but have not completely removed the contaminated ties, which raises an environmental issue due to the adjacent Ashokan Reservoir, which supplies drinking water to New York City, and Esopus Creek, both of which provide habitat for much wildlife, including a large population of bald eagles.
