= Fork Ridge =

Mountain in New York, United States

- Location within New York Location within the United States

Highest point
- Elevation: 2,054 feet (626 m)
- Coordinates: 42°02′26″N 74°22′05″W, 42°02′42″N 74°22′45″W

Geography
- Location: Phoenicia, New York, U.S.
- Topo map: USGS Phoenicia

Fork Ridge is a ridge located in the Catskill Mountains of New York south-southwest of Phoenicia. Wittenberg Mountain is located southeast, Terrace Mountain is located east-southeast, and Garfield Mountain is located north of Fork Ridge.
