= Empire State Railway Museum =

Coordinates: 42°04′49″N 74°18′30″W

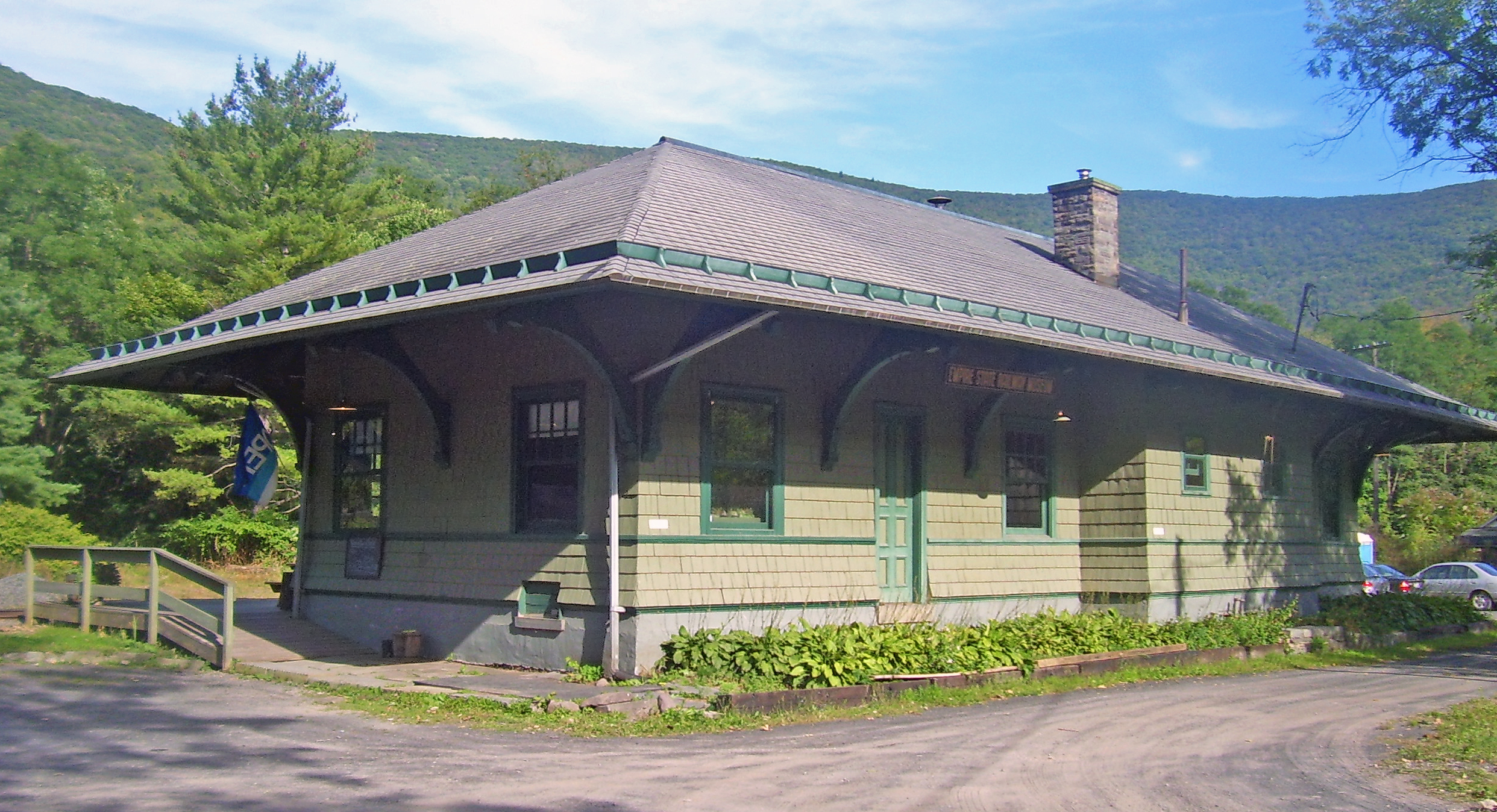
- Phoenicia Railroad Station, home of ESRM
- Established: 1960
- Location: Phoenicia Railroad Station
- Type: Railway museum
- President: Dakin Moorehouse
- Website: http://www.esrm.com/

Established in 1960, the Empire State Railway Museum is a non-profit railroad museum currently located in the historic Ulster & Delaware Phoenicia Railroad Station, Phoenicia, New York. The station was built in 1899 by the U&D, and is one of the few surviving examples left along the line. The museum owns a small collection of historic railroad equipment. The museum was formerly the publisher of the annual Steam Railroad Directory until the 2006 edition, when the title was taken over by Kalmbach Publishing and now released as the Tourist Trains Guidebook.

== ESRM in Middletown (1960-1970) ==
The museum was established by railroad enthusiasts from the New York metropolitan area in 1960. The organization sponsored many steam excursions and other railfan activities throughout the region, but was working towards the goal of establishing a permanent home. The possibility of purchasing a segment of the New York Central Putnam Division was considered, as the middle portion of the line was abandoned in 1962. Member Jay Wulfson took ownership of the Middletown and New Jersey Railroad, and ESRM equipment began to gather in Middletown, New York. Member Stephen D. Bogen purchased Baldwin Locomotive Works 2-6-2 #103 from the Sumter and Choctaw Railway in Alabama and had the engine shipped to New York on a flatcar. Additional equipment including coaches and a caboose were purchased and excursions began operating under the name Middletown & Orange Railroad.

In 1964, Wulfson moved on to launch the Vermont Railway, and the M&NJ was acquired by ESRM member Peter Rasmussen. In 1965, ESRM began publishing the Steam Passenger Service Directory, an annual listing of tourist railroads and museums around the country. Regular excursions on the M&NJ ended in 1966 due to deteriorating track conditions and vandalism, and the equipment was stored. The search for a permanent home to run steam excursions began again.

Around the same time, efforts to launch a steam tourist railroad in Connecticut were gaining momentum. The collection of equipment that was housed in Middletown was moved to Essex, Connecticut, between 1970 and 1971, finding a new home on the Valley Railroad. Many former ESRM members began to volunteer on the Valley Railroad, and went on to form a group that would become the basis for the Railroad Museum of New England. As a result, membership in ESRM diminished.

== Move to Phoenicia (1971-1985) ==
The remaining members of ESRM continued to meet, but steam excursions were no longer operated on the M&NJ. Looking for a new home, the organization considered relocating to Ulster County, along tracks to be operated by the newly-formed Catskill Mountain Railroad. In 1985, the station in Phoenicia, New York, was purchased by ESRM and a local community redevelopment organization. Built in 1899 by the Ulster and Delaware Railroad, it is one of only two surviving examples located along the line in its original location. The structure was restored and renovated by volunteers to serve as the new home of the museum.

Former Lake Superior & Ishpeming 2-8-0 No. 23 was purchased from the bankrupt Marquette and Huron Mountain Railroad and moved to Kingston, New York, in 1985. Members of ESRM had planned to operate the steam locomotive on tracks leased by Catskill Mountain Railroad to create an attraction similar to the Strasburg Railroad.

At the same time, a number of ESRM members joined the Connecticut Valley Railroad Museum and negotiated the release of several pieces of equipment from the Valley Railroad for return to New York State. It was anticipated that the tracks would be in regular operation to bring visitors from Kingston up to the new museum in Phoenicia.

== ESRM Today ==
The museum has seasonal exhibits in the station related to the history of the railroads in the Catskill Mountain region. The station was the western terminal of the Catskill Mountain Railroad until the end of 2016. Without the trains to bring a steady stream of visitors, museum attendance is down.

The museum is the owner of several pieces of vintage railway equipment, including former LS&I No. 23, a 2-8-0 steam locomotive that has been the subject of restoration efforts over the last 20 years. A rebuilding and extension of the tender was completed in 2002. When CMRR was forced to vacate its storage yard in Kingston, New York in 2016, the steam locomotive was moved to Phoenicia, and placed inside a new barn constructed on museum property.

== Roster of Equipment ==
The Empire State Railway Museum owns a small collection of historic railroad equipment, currently none are on display to the public. Some items have been placed inside the barn for possible future restoration and display.

- Lake Superior & Ishpeming 2-8-0 No. 23
- Delaware & Hudson Railway baggage car
- Boston & Maine Railroad baggage car
- Central Vermont Railroad automobile boxcar
- New Haven caboose
- Delaware & Hudson Railway caboose No. 35952
