= All Souls Church (Tannersville, New York) =

Historic church in New York, United States

- U.S. National Register of Historic Places
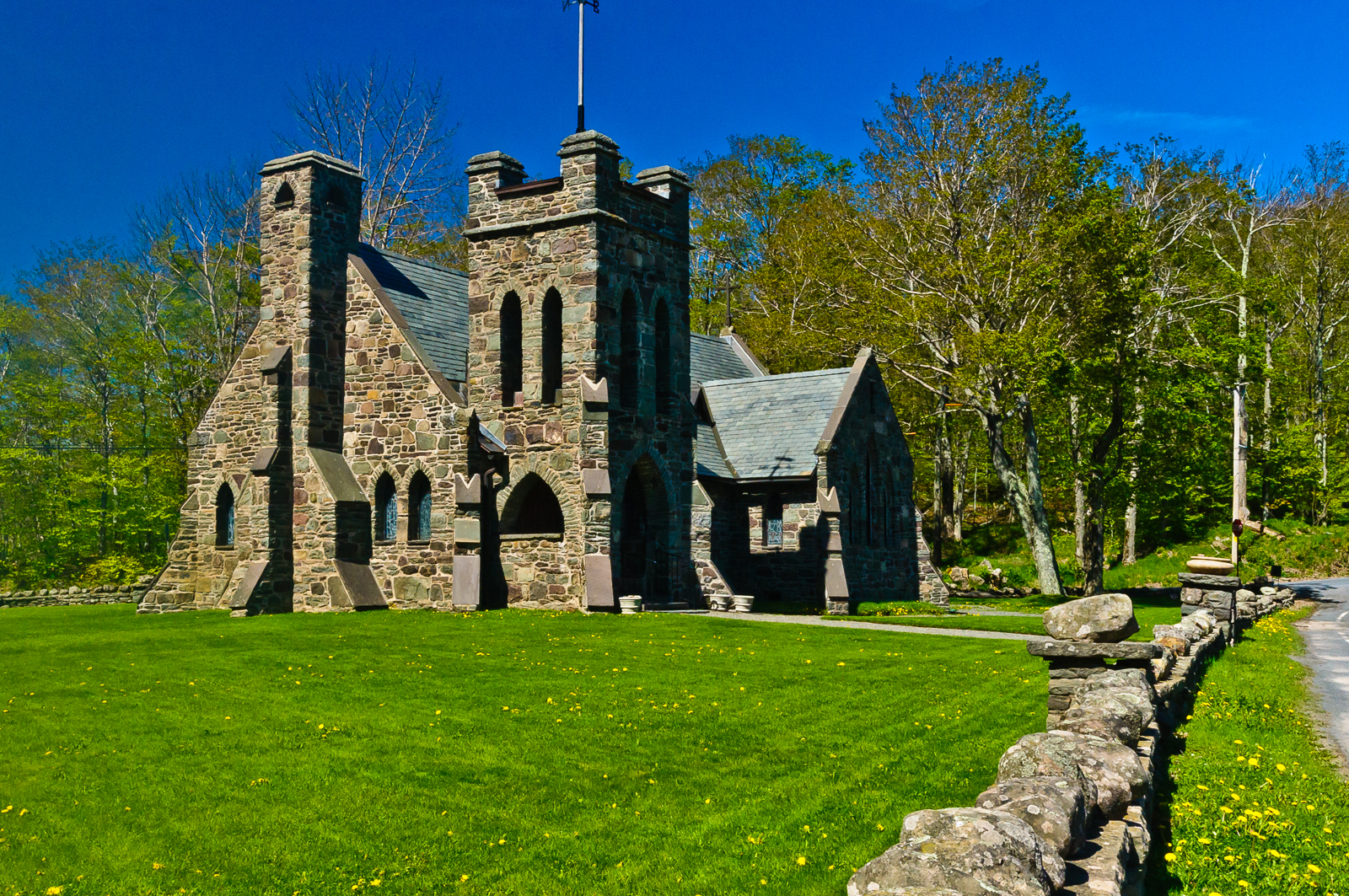

- Location within New York Location within the United States
- Nearest city: Tannersville, New York
- Coordinates: 42°13′29″N 74°8′5″W
- Area: less than one acre
- Built: 1894
- Architect: Reid, George Agnew
- Architectural style: Late Gothic Revival
- NRHP reference No.: 93001223
- Added to NRHP: November 24, 1993

All Souls Church is an historic Episcopal church located at Tannersville in Greene County, New York. It was erected in 1894 as a small stone chapel in the Gothic Revival style. It was subsequently enlarged in the 1910s with the enlargement of the chancel and addition of transepts. It features a large square bell tower at the southwest corner that also serves as the principal entrance.

It was added to the National Register of Historic Places in 1993.

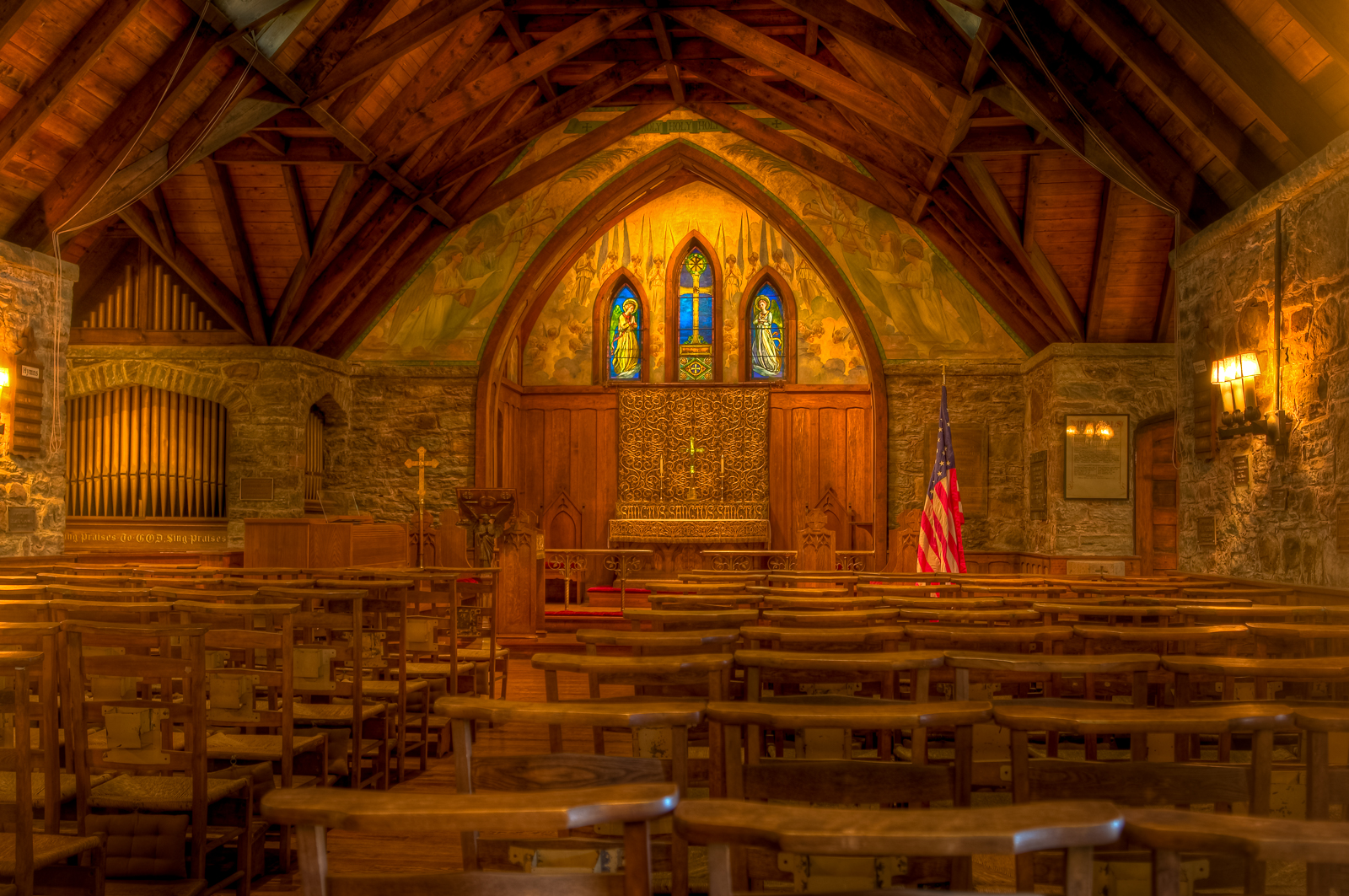
Inside the church

== See also ==
- National Register of Historic Places listings in Greene County, New York
