= Tannersville station (New York) =

Tannersville

General information
- Location: Tannersville, Greene County. New York
- Coordinates: 42.1912°N 74.1336°W
- Tracks: 1

History
- Opened: June 25, 1883
- Closed: January 22, 1940

Key dates
- February 21, 1940: Station agent eliminated
- March 2, 1966: Station depot burned

Services
Preceding station	New York Central Railroad	Following station
Haines Falls toward Kaaterskill	Kaaterskill Branch	Kaaterskill Junction toward Phoenicia
Location

Tannersville was a train station in Tannersville, New York operated by the Ulster and Delaware Railroad. It ceased operation in 1940 and was burned down on March 2, 1966.

== History ==
The original station at Tannersvile, New York, branch MP 14.6, was architecturally similar to the Lanesville station; a small building with a platform on each end, was also torn down in 1899, after the Kaaterskill Railroad was standard-gauged by the U&D in 1899.

The new Tannersville station was a fabricated station made for the U&D in the early 1900s. This station had the typical frame of a U&D pre-fab station, but had three platforms; one on the left, one on the right, and another as an extension at the back of the station.

Tannersville was considered to be a successful year-round station, although branches of the U&D later became summer-only operations.

Tannersville's terminal was still standing after U&D's branches were abandoned in 1939 and scrapped in 1940. The terminal was then purchased by the town of Hunter in order to function as town offices and a snowplow garage.

The terminal was razed by a fire on March 2, 1966, along with three trucks and power equipment.

== Bibliography ==
- Interstate Commerce Commission (1940). Decisions of the Interstate Commerce Commission of the United States (Finance Reports). Washington D.C.: Government Printing Office.
- National Railroad Adjustment Board (1941). Awards 1451 to 1550 Interpretations Third Division. La Grange, Illinois: Suburban Printers and Publishers Inc.
