= Oliver Robert Hawke Bury =

English railway engineer (1861-1946)

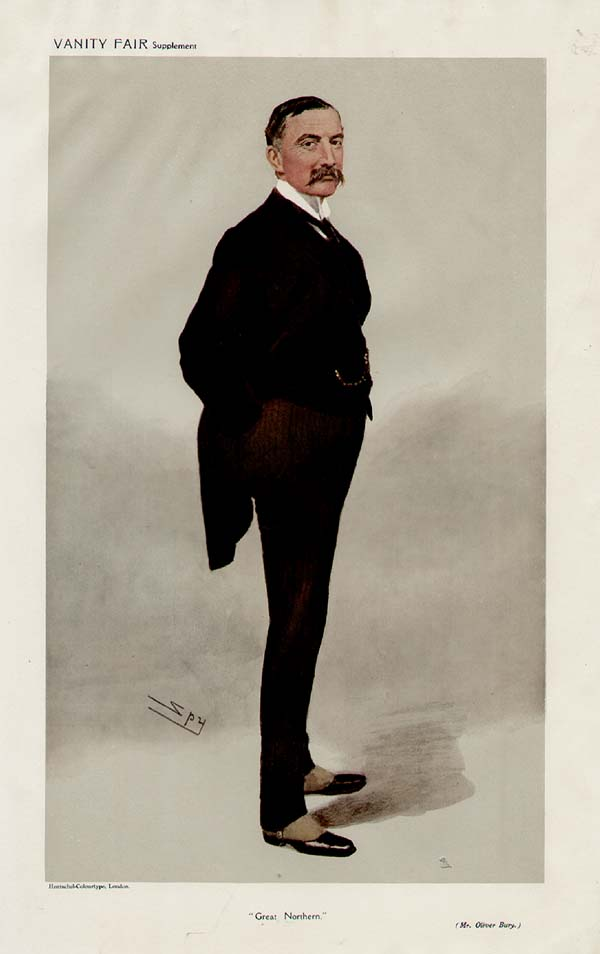
Oliver Robert Hawke Bury by Leslie Ward c.1900

Oliver Robert Hawke Bury (3 November 1861 – 21 March 1946) was an English railway engineer, chief mechanical engineer on the Great Western Railway of Brazil, General Manager of the Great Northern Railway in England and Director of the London and North Eastern Railway.

Bury, the son of a barrister, was born in London and educated at Westminster School. The first manager of the Great Northern Railway in 1847 had been his great-uncle. In 1879 he was apprenticed to William Adams, locomotive engineer on the London and South Western Railway.

At Hunter and English of Bow, steam engine manufacturers from 1791 to 1921, he worked on the construction of both a floating crane and of a distillery in 1881. From there he joined the Coleford Railway in 1884 and became resident engineer of the Great Western Railway of Brazil under Ailsa Janson, becoming locomotive superintendent in 1885.

His appointment as Chief Engineer and Manager of the Great Western Railway of Brazil followed in 1892. Thereafter he joined the Entre Rios Railway in Argentina and went on to the Buenos Aires and Rosario Railway. He returned to England in 1902 to become General Manager of the Great Northern Railway, joining the GNR Board in 1912. He was a Director of the London and North Eastern Railway until 1945. His business interests extended to South America.

He was married to Annie Eliza. His daughter, Sybil Maude Haigh Bury, married Harold Manston Ommanney, of Hatfield, Hertfordshire (1885–1964) in 1913 and divorced him in 1927. Mary Edith Haigh Bury was born in Belgrano on 3 February 1895.

Bury died, aged 84, in London.
