= Kaaterskill station =

Kaaterskill

General information
- Location: Kaaterskill, Greene County. New York
- Coordinates: 42.1968°N 74.0360°W
- Tracks: 1

History
- Opened: June 25, 1883
- Closed: January 22, 1940

Services
Preceding station	New York Central Railroad	Following station
Terminus	Kaaterskill Branch	Laurel House toward Phoenicia
Location

Kaaterskill station, branch MP 19.1, was one of the busiest railroad stations on the branch lines of the Ulster and Delaware Railroad (U&D). It was near the banks of South Lake in Kaaterskill, New York, and was a major stop for people who wished to stay at the Hotel Kaaterskill or the Catskill Mountain House, which was 0.93 miles from the station.

It was also where ice that had been harvested from South Lake would be loaded into freight cars to be shipped around. Lumber was also shipped from the surrounding area and loaded here, making it only one of many stops on the Ulster & Delaware where lumber would be loaded.

This station became only a flagstop (except for the summertime) when the New York Central had purchased the U&D in 1932, and any business that was generated at the station in fall, winter or spring was handled by the station agent at Tannersville, New York. It was finally abandoned when the New York Central abandoned the branches in 1939 and scrapped them in 1940. It was left to fall apart until it was consumed by fire in the 1960s.

== Bibliography ==
- Interstate Commerce Commission (1940). Decisions of the Interstate Commerce Commission of the United States (Finance Reports). Washington D.C.: Government Printing Office.
