= Sheridan Mountain =

Mountain in New York, United States

- Location within New York Location within the United States

Highest point
- Elevation: 2,221 feet (677 m)
- Coordinates: 42°06′14″N 74°19′41″W

Geography
- Location: Phoenicia, New York, U.S.
- Topo map: USGS Phoenicia

Sheridan Mountain is a mountain located in the Catskill Mountains of New York north-northwest of Phoenicia. Fork Ridge is located southwest, and Romer Mountain is located south of Sheridan Mountain.
