= Catskill and Tannersville Railway =

Historic railroad in New York, US

Map

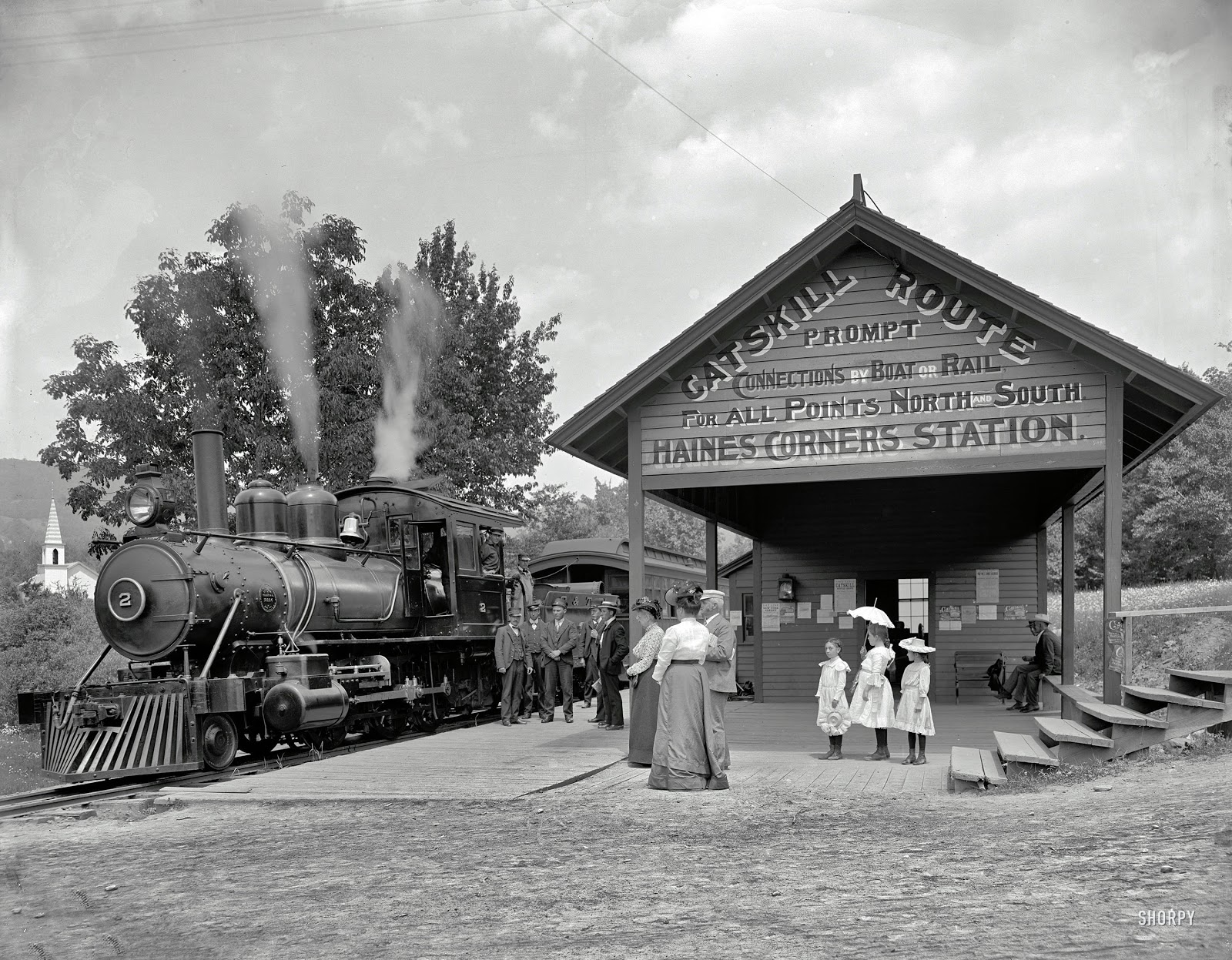
Catskill & Tannersville Railway's 2-6-0 Baldwin locomotive No. 2 built in April 1901

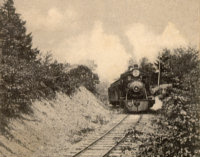
The 'Huckleberry Express' of the Catskill & Tannersville Railway on its daily trip from Tannersville to Otis Summit in Kaaterskill

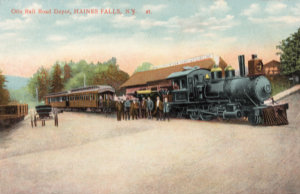
Catskill & Tannersville Railway's No 2 resting at Haines Falls Station

The Catskill and Tannersville Railway was a historic 3 ft (914 mm) narrow gauge railroad operating in New York.

Also known as "The Huckleberry", the C&T operated tracks that were laid to a 3 ft (914 mm) narrow gauge. The railroad commenced at the Otis Summit station in Kaaterskill at the top of the Wall of Manitou, which was the terminus of the Otis Elevating Railway, and ended 5.2 miles (8.4 km) away at its headquarters in Tannersville. The C&T faced competition from the parallel Stony Clove and Kaaterskill branch of the Ulster and Delaware Railroad.

== History ==
The Catskill Mountain Railway didn't always have the Catskill & Tannersville to connect the Otis Elevating Railway to Tannersville. Instead, the Kaaterskill Railroad served that purpose, as it was the same 3 ft (914 mm) narrow gauge as the Otis Elevating and the Catskill Mountain Railway, and connected by a shorter C&T from the Otis Summit Station, too. But the C&T was also present in the area, and was very close to the Kaaterskill. In fact, the two lines were so close that the C&T ran trains on the KRR from 1893-1898. This stopped when the Ulster and Delaware converted the Kaaterskill Railroad to 4 ft 8 1/2 in (1,435 mm) standard gauge in 1899, and the connection was no more. So the CMR president solved that problem by lengthening the C&T to Tannersville in 1899.

It was built on a tight budget, and used 3 ft (914 mm) narrow gauge track so it could interchange freight cars with the Otis, and because it was cheaper. It only had two locomotives in its roster, both eventually being replaced by outside-frame engines. This railroad was the Ulster & Delaware's narrow gauge competitor; it did offer an alternative route, but this "alternative route" was right next to the U&D, and most of the C&T stations were right across from the U&D stations. There were downfalls to using this railroad, and that included the fact that it's Trains barely ever ran on time. This was probably due to the frequent stops to let passengers get out and see the Kaaterskill Falls, the mountain laurel in full bloom, and even to pick blueberries, which the locals called "huckleberries", hence the railroad's nickname, and was probably enjoyed by the fellow passengers.

The railroad was somewhat profitable, and managed to survive for quite a while, but it couldn't stave off bankruptcy. It went bankrupt in 1918, and was torn up and sold for scrap, along with the rest of the Catskill Mountain Railway system in 1919. The two locomotives that were previously owned by the C&T were shipped to the Bellevue and Cascade Railroad in the State of Iowa.

== Stations ==
- Tannersville Station
- Clum Road Station
- The Antlers Hotel
- Haines Falls Station
- Laurel House Station
- Otis Summit Station

== Locomotives ==
Number	Name	Builder	Type	Date	Shop No.	Remarks
1st #1		Brooks Locomotive Works	2-6-0	Sep. 1882	783	Ex-Colorado & Southern Ry. #20, previously Denver, Leadville & Gunnison Ry. #165, originally Denver, South Park & Pacific R.R. #38. Purchased in June 1899. (The transfer from the C.&S. Ry. to the Otis Co. may have been via F. M. Hicks & Co. The photo of 1st #1 at Otis Summit, reproduced in the Helmer (1970) reference, identifies it as one of the D.S.P.&P. R.R. ##29-38 / 156-165 series locos, particularly the driver axle spacing, the location of the right boiler check valve, and the shape of the tops of the cab windows. C.&S. Ry. #20 was the only ex-D.S.P.&P. R.R. ##29-38 / 156-165 series loco to have left Colorado before July 1899.) Retired in 1907.
1st #2		Dickson Manufacturing Co.	2-6-0	Feb. 1883	411	Originally Chateaugay Ore & Iron Co. #8 (Dannemora). Purchased by the Kaaterskill R.R. from New York Equipment Co. in July 1893 (#3). Redesignated U.&D. R.R. # 4 in 1894. Resold to F. M. Hicks & Co. in August 1899. Acquired by the Otis Co. for C.&T. Ry. later in August 1899. Became stationary boiler at Otis Summit, New York between July 1, 1901 and June 30, 1902.
2nd #1	Isaac Pruyn	Baldwin Locomotive Works	2-6-0	Feb. 1908	32715	Purchased new. Sold to Chicago, Milwaukee, St. Paul & Pacific R.R. in March 1926 (CMStP&P #2). Became Bellevue and Cascade Railroad #2 in July 1933. Scrapped in 1934.
2nd #2	Alfred V. S. Olcott	Baldwin Locomotive Works	2-6-0	Apr. 1901	18884	Purchased new. Sold to Chicago, Milwaukee, St. Paul & Pacific R.R. in July 1928 (CMStP&P #3). Became Bellevue and Cascade Railroad #3 in July 1933. Scrapped in 1934.

== Rolling stock ==
Number	Type	Capacity	Remarks
1	combine car	38 seats	Ex-Worcester & Shrewsbury R.R. Purchased in 1899. Sold to a South American in September 1919.
2	coach	58 seats	Ex-Worcester & Shrewsbury R.R. Purchased in 1899. Sold to a South American in September 1919.
	coach	58 seats	Purchased used in 1909 or 1910. Sold to a South American in September 1919.
3	freight car	10 tons	Obtained as a flat car in 1899. Converted to boxcar in 1904 or 1905.
	flat car	10 tons	Obtained in 1901 or 1902. One of the two C.&T. Ry. freight cars may have been temporarily configured as an open observation car.

== Freight Car Interchange ==
In 1904, a freight car interchange was installed between the C.&T. Ry. and the Otis Ry. at Otis Summit. The Catskill Mountain Ry. built the following freight cars for use through this interchange, and through the interchange with the C.M. Ry. at the foot of the Otis Ry.

Owner & Car No.	Type	Capacity	Remarks
Otis Ry. 1	boxcar	8 short tons (7.1 long tons; 7.3 t)	Built in 1904
Otis Ry. 2	boxcar	8 tons	Built in 1904
Otis Ry. 3	gondola	8 tons	Built in 1904
Otis Ry. 4	gondola	8 tons	Built in 1904
C.M. Ry. 15	gondola	8 tons	Built in 1906 or 1907
C.M. Ry. 16	gondola	8 tons	Built in 1906 or 1907
C.M. Ry. 17	boxcar	8 tons	Built in 1907 or 1908
C.M. Ry. 18	boxcar	8 tons	Built in 1907 or 1908
