= Phoenicia station =

Defunct railroad station

Phoenicia
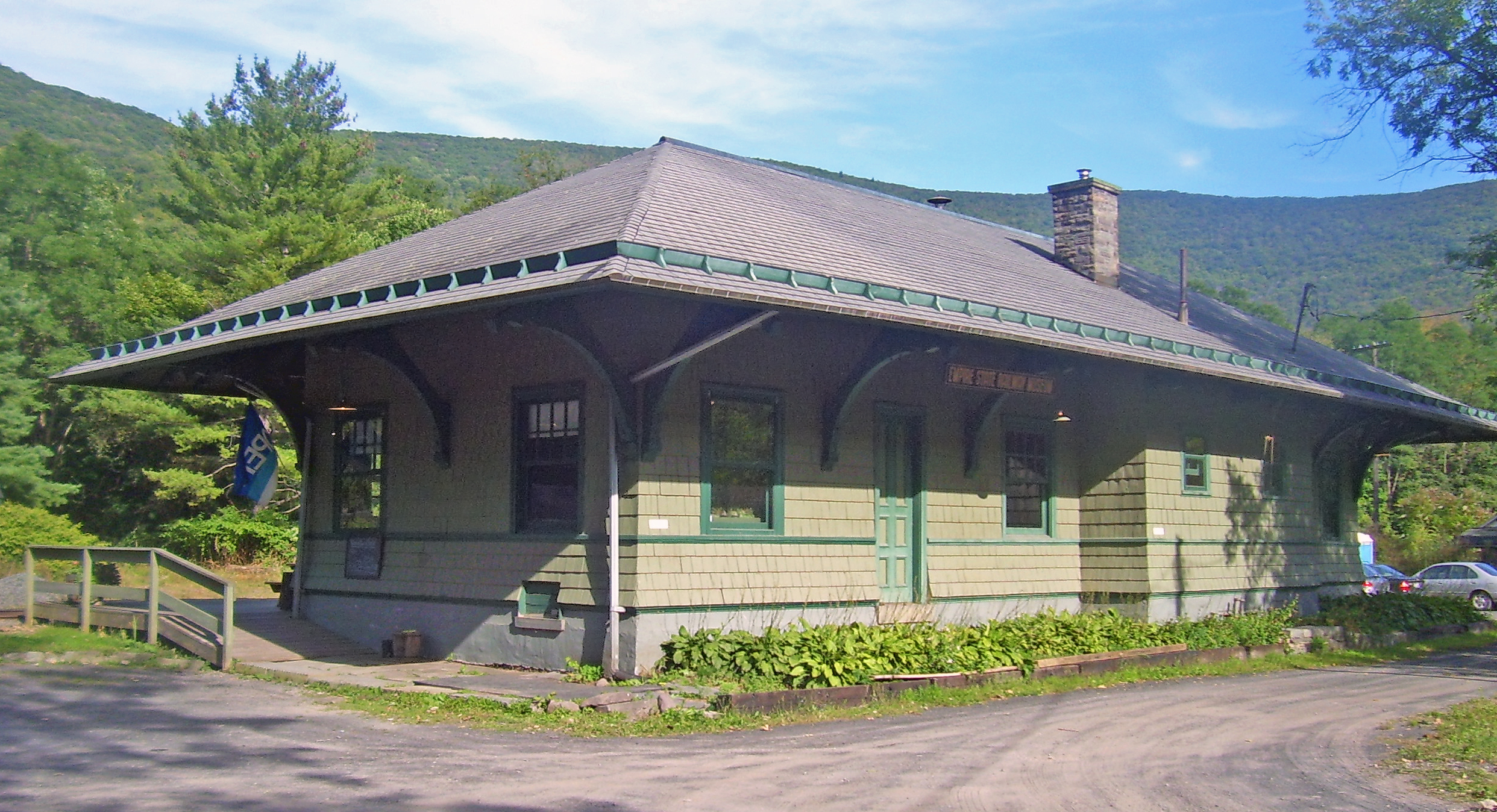
- West elevation and north profile of Phoenicia station in 2008

General information
- Location: 70 Lower High Street, Phoenicia, New York 12464
- Tracks: 1

History
- Opened: May 23, 1870
- Closed: March 31, 1954
- Rebuilt: 1899

Services
Preceding station	New York Central Railroad	Following station
Shandaken toward Oneonta	Catskill Mountain Branch	Mount Pleasant toward Kingston Point
Chichester toward Kaaterskill	Kaaterskill Branch	Terminus
- Phoenicia Railroad Station
- U.S. National Register of Historic Places
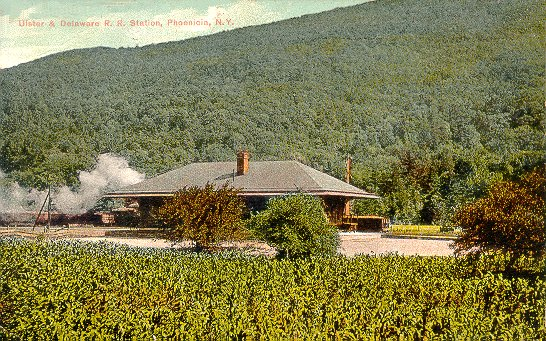
- Postcard view of Phoenicia station.

- Location within New York Location within the United States
- Location: Phoenicia, NY
- Nearest city: Kingston
- Coordinates: 42°04′49″N 74°18′30″W
- Area: less than one acre
- Built: 1899
- Architectural style: Shingle Style
- NRHP reference No.: 95000474
- Added to NRHP: April 20, 1995
Location

Phoenicia is a defunct commuter railroad station in the eponymous hamlet of Phoenicia, located in the town of Shandaken, Ulster County, New York. Located on Lower High Street, the station serviced trains of New York Central Railroad's Catskill Mountain and Kaaterskill Branches. Trains on the Catskill Mountain Branch went between Oneonta in Otsego County and Kingston Point. Phoenicia marked the beginning of the Kaaterskill Branch, which would take train riders to the namesake Kaaterskill station. The station consisted of a single side platform but with two through tracks and a yard track, along with a wooden frame station depot which remains standing.

Service through Phoenicia began on May 23, 1870 with the opening of the Rondout and Oswego Railroad to Phoenicia. Service on the Kaaterskill Branch began on June 25, 1883. The current station depot at Phoenicia opened in 1899. The last train to Kaaterskill ran on January 22, 1940 and passenger service at Phoenicia ended entirely on March 31, 1954. Phoenicia station became home of the Empire State Railway Museum in 1983 and was placed on National Register of Historic Places on April 20, 1995 as Phoenicia Railroad Station.

== Station design ==
The station is located just south of High Street, a road that leads into Phoenicia from the NY 28 state highway. It is situated in an open area on the flood plain of nearby Esopus Creek across from the southwestern foot of Mount Tremper. There is a parking lot to the south, and a kiosk to the north, but no other buildings in the area save a small sandwich shop.

The building itself is a one-story rectangular frame structure on a stone foundation sided in wood shingles. Its peaked roof, shingled in asphalt, is pierced by a stone chimney on the west side.

Continuous wooden molding runs around the building where the foundation, of bluestone in an ashlar pattern, gives way to the shingles. The wall flares outward slightly between it and another molded course below the windows. The roof has a deep overhang, with exposed eaves and decorative brackets. It shelters a wooden platform, raised so that boarding stools would not be needed, at trackside.

Inside, the station retains its original layout except for one closet that was built for electrical control equipment. Both the waiting room and the baggage room are now given over to museum displays. They are sided in narrow beadboard yellow pine, laid both horizontally and vertically, up to the vaulted ceiling. The floors have three-inch (7.5 cm) tongue and groove planking.

Between the two rooms on the track side is the ticket agent's office, which retains its brass window bars and coffee-glass windows. The original benches, water fountain and sink are still in the waiting room along with an original heating grate. A cast iron air distribution pedestal was moved slightly from its original location to make room for a new electrical outlet.

The track next to the station is standard gauge. It is the only one of five that were once here.

== History ==
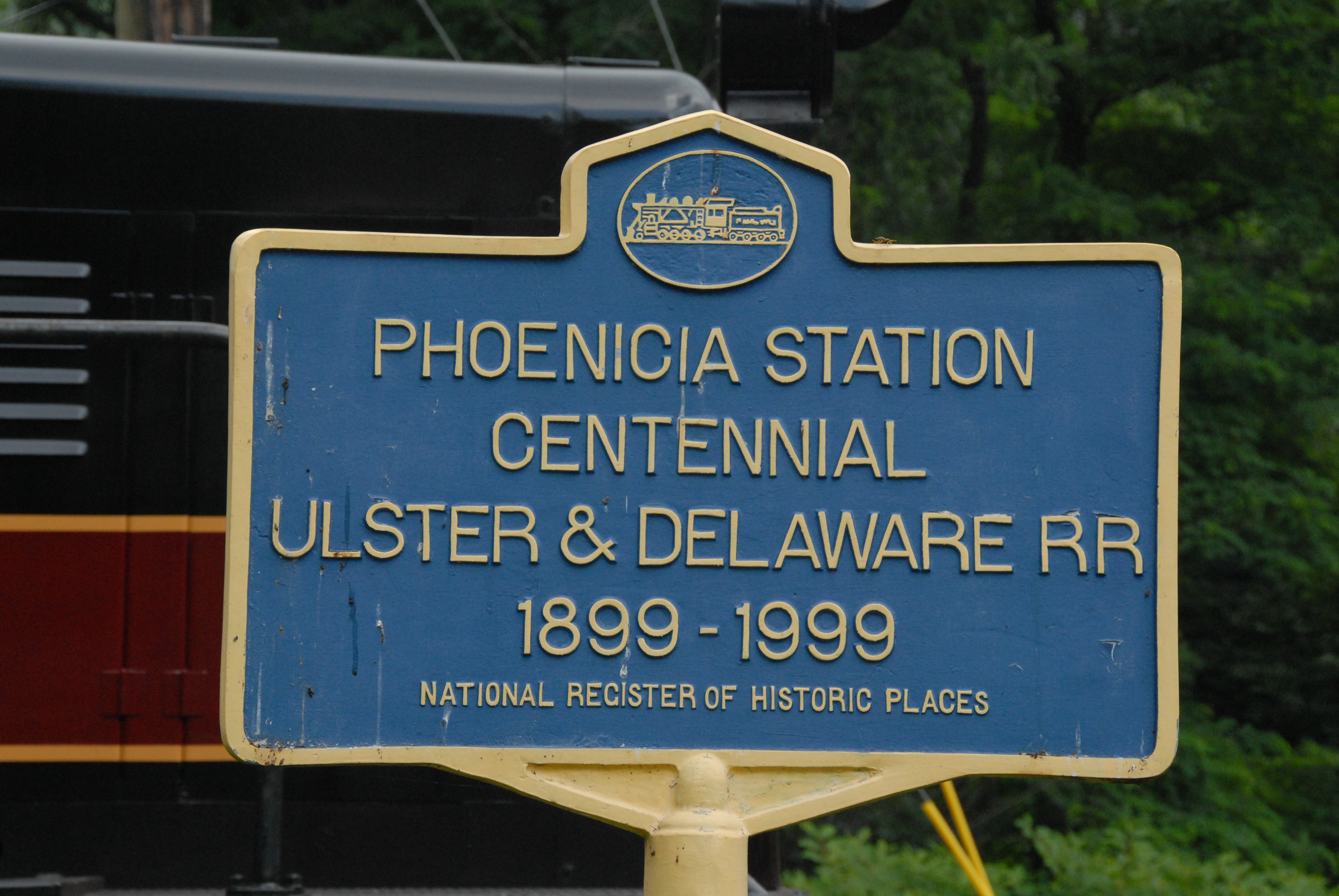
Sign at Phoenicia station

Thomas Cornell started the Ulster and Delaware's predecessor, the Rondout and Oswego, in 1866 to get goods from Central New York to what is now Kingston: already the terminus of the Delaware and Hudson Canal, which had established itself as the main route carrying coal from Northeast Pennsylvania to New York City via the Hudson River. Phoenicia would be, for a long time, the southern terminus of its narrow-gauge lines, with a branch, the Stony Clove and Catskill Mountain Railroad, opened through Stony Clove Notch to Hunter in 1882.

The first Phoenicia station was an 1870 masonry building located near the present intersection of Plank Road and Lower High Street in Phoenicia. The station's business increased when the branch was built in 1882; this led to two porticos being added, one on each side. Eventually, in 1900, the Ulster and Delaware would reach Oneonta. In 1899, the branch line was converted to standard-gauge due to steady growth in its passenger service to mountain resorts.

This new pre-fabricated structure (a near duplicate of the still-extant Oneonta station, now a local bar and restaurant named "The Depot") was now the busiest station on the line, serving both the main line and the branch. In 1913, its busiest year, 676,000 passengers passed through. Its five tracks and relocation prevented the backups that had been caused by the trains stopped at Phoenicia to load and unload passengers, since trains extended onto the nearby Esopus Creek bridge.

It also had a freight house which served both the main line and the branches, just like the passenger station. In 1906, it was used as a location by Biograph for Holdup of the Rocky Mountain Express: an early nickelodeon film shot on paper, since transferred to film by the Library of Congress. Even after the Ulster and Delaware collapsed and was sold to the New York Central Railroad on February 1, 1932, the station remained busy. After passenger service was ended on March 30, 1954, the station was left to deteriorate. Penn Central Railroad discontinued freight service on September 30, 1976.

However, before it could be destroyed, John Ham, a local railroad buff, purchased the station from Penn Central. It is currently the home of the Empire State Railway Museum, which opened there in 1985.

After the Esopus flooded, following Hurricane Irene in 2011, the museum building suffered damage and closed indefinitely. The museum's staff later repaired and reopened it. It has been open for self-guided tours weekends and holidays Memorial Day through Columbus Day.

== See also ==
- National Register of Historic Places listings in Ulster County, New York
