= Tannersville, New York =

- Village
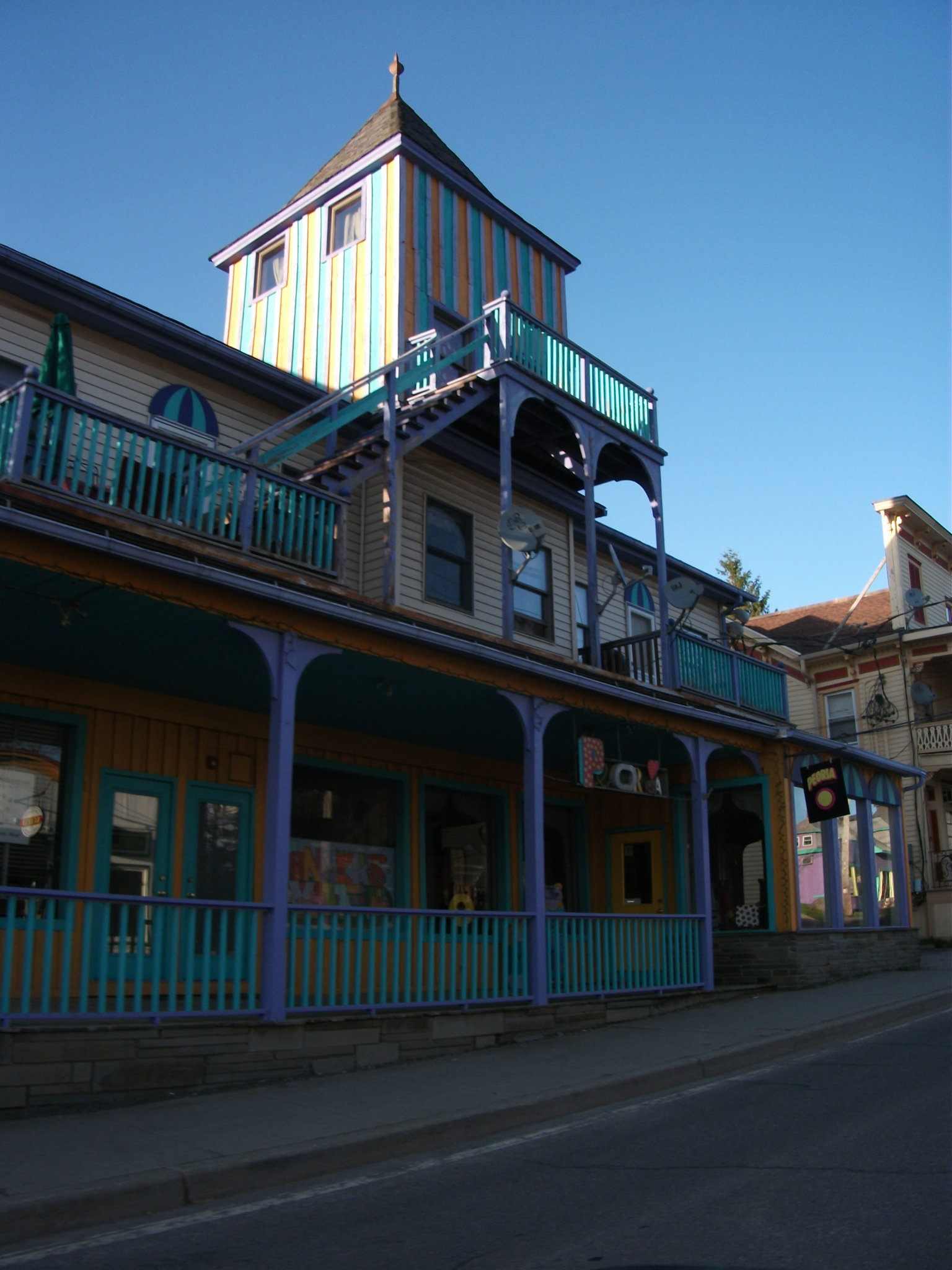

- Logo
- Motto: "The Painted Village in the Sky"
- Location within New York Location within the United States
- Coordinates: 42°11′37″N 74°8′20″W
- Country: United States
- State: New York
- County: Greene
- Town: Hunter

Government
  - Type: Incorporated Village
  - Mayor: Lee McGunnigle
  - Trustee: Gorge Kelly Gil Adler Rebecca Fitting Kody Leech

Area
  - Total: 1.15 sq mi (2.98 km^{2})
  - Land: 1.12 sq mi (2.90 km^{2})
  - Water: 0.031 sq mi (0.08 km^{2})
- Elevation: 1,900 ft (579 m)

Population (2020)
  - Total: 568
  - Density: 508/sq mi (196.1/km^{2})
- Time zone: UTC-5 (Eastern (EST))
  - Summer (DST): UTC-4 (EDT)
- ZIP Code: 12485
- Area code: 518
- FIPS code: 36-73143
- GNIS feature ID: 967045
- Website: www.tannersvilleny.org

Tannersville is a village in Greene County, New York, United States. The village is in the north-central part of the town of Hunter on Route 23A. The population was 568 at the 2020 census.

== History ==
The village was founded around lumber mills and tanneries. It was incorporated in 1895.

Tannersville's tanning business collapsed in the mid-19th century. It was gradually replaced by the summer resort trade, which reached its peak in 1882 when the railroad came to Tannersville. However, the rise of the automobile in the early 20th century led to a steady economic decline, as travelers were no longer rooted to one spot for an entire summer.

Due to its close proximity to Hunter Mountain ski area, it serves as the local commercial district, with inns, restaurants, and shopping.

Tannersville has experienced a revival in the 21st century. The Hunter Foundation has implemented the town-wide "Paint Program" — the vision of Elena Patterson, a local artist — with the help and support of Glenn Weyant who was the mayor at the time, corporate sponsors, and local residents. The Paint Project involves painting downtown buildings in multicolored pastels, often with cartoon-like pictures on the shutters. It has attracted waves of tourists who come to see the dramatic paint schemes. The project prompted much attention when it was publicized in The New York Times in 2003. The project was also featured on NBC's Today show, on CNBC, and on all three of the local Albany-based television networks. The village also received some attention for serving as the center of activities for the Catskill Jazz Factory artist development program.

Tannersville is experiencing an influx of tourists from both the New York and other areas, who are attracted to its abundant hiking trails and waterfalls.

The Tannersville Main Street Historic District was listed on the National Register of Historic Places (NRHP) in 2008. Other NRHP listed buildings are All Souls Church and Hathaway.

In November 2021, Tannersville was named the second Capital Region winner of the 5th round of the New York State Downtown Revitalization Initiative. The $10 million grant would enable the town to focus on economic development and improvements to enrichment. "With the impact COVID-19 has had on small businesses and communities, it is crucial that the state invest in their revitalization so we can come back better than before," Governor Kathy Hochul said. "This funding will help take Tannersville, a village rich with history, to the next level so that it may grow and flourish as an example of the best of what Upstate New York has to offer."

== Notable people ==
- Maude Adams, actress, first American to play Peter Pan
- Josephine Daskam Bacon, Author, poet and playwright
- Edward Coleman Delafield, president of Bank of America
- Slow Joe Doyle, Major League Baseball pitcher
- Gil Hanse, golf course architect
- Candace Thurber Wheeler, considered the Mother of American Interior Design

== Geography ==
Tannersville is located in southern Greene County at 42°11′37″N 74°8′20″W (42.193619, -74.139011), in the northern part of the town of Hunter. It is situated at an elevation of 1,900 feet (580 m) in the Catskill Mountains just west of the height of land on New York State Route 23A: Sawmill Creek flows southwest through the center of the village into Gooseberry Creek and thence into Schoharie Creek, a north-flowing tributary of the Mohawk River, while just 2 miles (3 km) to the east, at Haines Falls, Kaaterskill Creek drops east into Kaaterskill Clove and thence into the Hudson River valley.

NY 23A is Tannersville's Main Street, leading east 16 miles (26 km) to Catskill and west 4 miles (6 km) to Hunter village.

According to the United States Census Bureau, Tannersville has a total area of 1.2 square miles (3.1 km^{2}), of which 1.2 square miles (3.0 km^{2}) is land and 0.04 square miles (0.1 km^{2}), or 2.73%, is water.

== Demographics ==
Historical population
Census	Pop.	Note	%±
1900	593		—
1910	660		11.3%
1920	597		−9.5%
1930	656		9.9%
1940	640		−2.4%
1950	639		−0.2%
1960	580		−9.2%
1970	650		12.1%
1980	685		5.4%
1990	465		−32.1%
2000	448		−3.7%
2010	539		20.3%
2020	568		5.4%
U.S. Decennial Census

As of the census of 2000, there were 448 people, 216 households, and 114 families residing in the village. The population density was 402.4 inhabitants per square mile (155.4/km^{2}). There were 505 housing units at an average density of 453.6 per square mile (175.1/km^{2}). The racial makeup of the village was 95.09% White, 0.89% African American, 0.22% Asian, 0.67% from other races, and 3.12% from two or more races. Hispanic or Latino of any race were 2.90% of the population.

There were 216 households, out of which 20.8% had children under the age of 18 living with them, 39.4% were married couples living together, 7.9% had a female householder with no husband present, and 46.8% were non-families. 40.3% of all households were made up of individuals, and 16.2% had someone living alone who was 65 years of age or older. The average household size was 2.07 and the average family size was 2.80.

In the village, the population was spread out, with 19.4% under the age of 18, 6.0% from 18 to 24, 24.3% from 25 to 44, 29.5% from 45 to 64, and 20.8% who were 65 years of age or older. The median age was 45 years. For every 100 females, there were 99.1 males. For every 100 females age 18 and over, there were 99.4 males.

The median income for a household in the village was $28,500, and the median income for a family was $37,500. Males had a median income of $27,708 versus $27,000 for females. The per capita income for the village was $15,318. About 10.7% of families and 18.5% of the population were below the poverty line, including 26.2% of those under age 18 and 10.4% of those age 65 or over.

A summertime Jewish vacation population has been active in Tannersville since the end of the 19th century, marking it as one of the first Borscht Belt communities. It was the summer home of Rabbi Dr. Joseph Breuer and much of the Khal Adath Jeshurun kehilla. Allegra Goodman's debut novel, Kaaterskill Falls was based on Tannersville and the time she spent as a child with the Washington Heights German Jewish community.

== Points of interest ==
- Mountain Top Arboretum
- Huckleberry Rail Trail
- Mountain Top Library
