= Romer Mountain =

Mountain in New York, United States

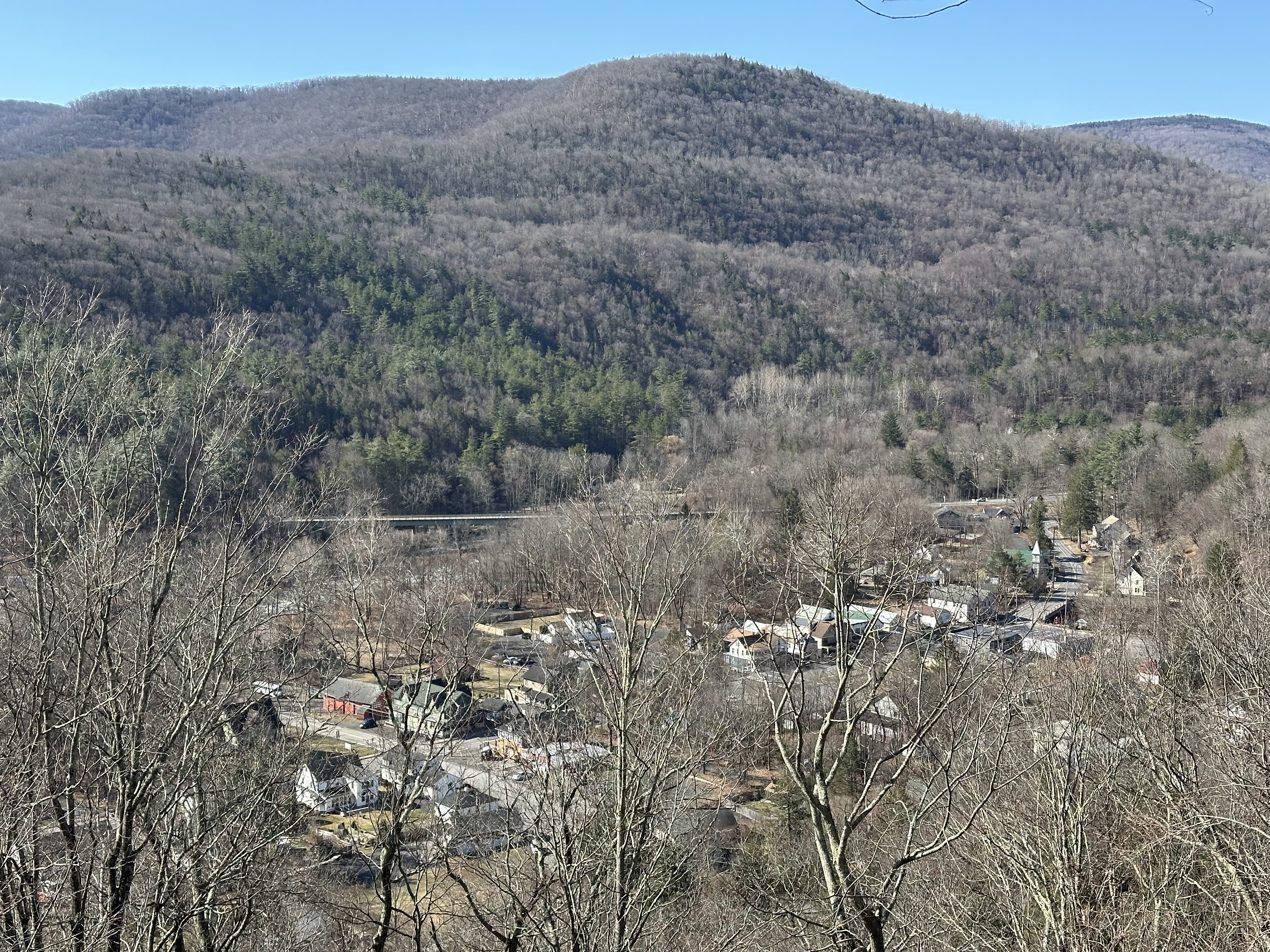
- Romer Mountain from Phoenicia Overlook, with Phoenicia, New York in the foreground

Highest point
- Elevation: 1,978 feet (603 m)
- Coordinates: 42°03′29″N 74°19′08″W

Geography
- Location within New York Location within the United States
- Location: Phoenicia, New York, U.S.
- Topo map: USGS Phoenicia

Romer Mountain is a mountain located in the Catskill Mountains of New York south of Phoenicia. Sheridan Mountain is located north, and Cross Mountain is located south of Romer Mountain.
