= Phoenicia, New York =

Phoenicia
- CDP and hamlet
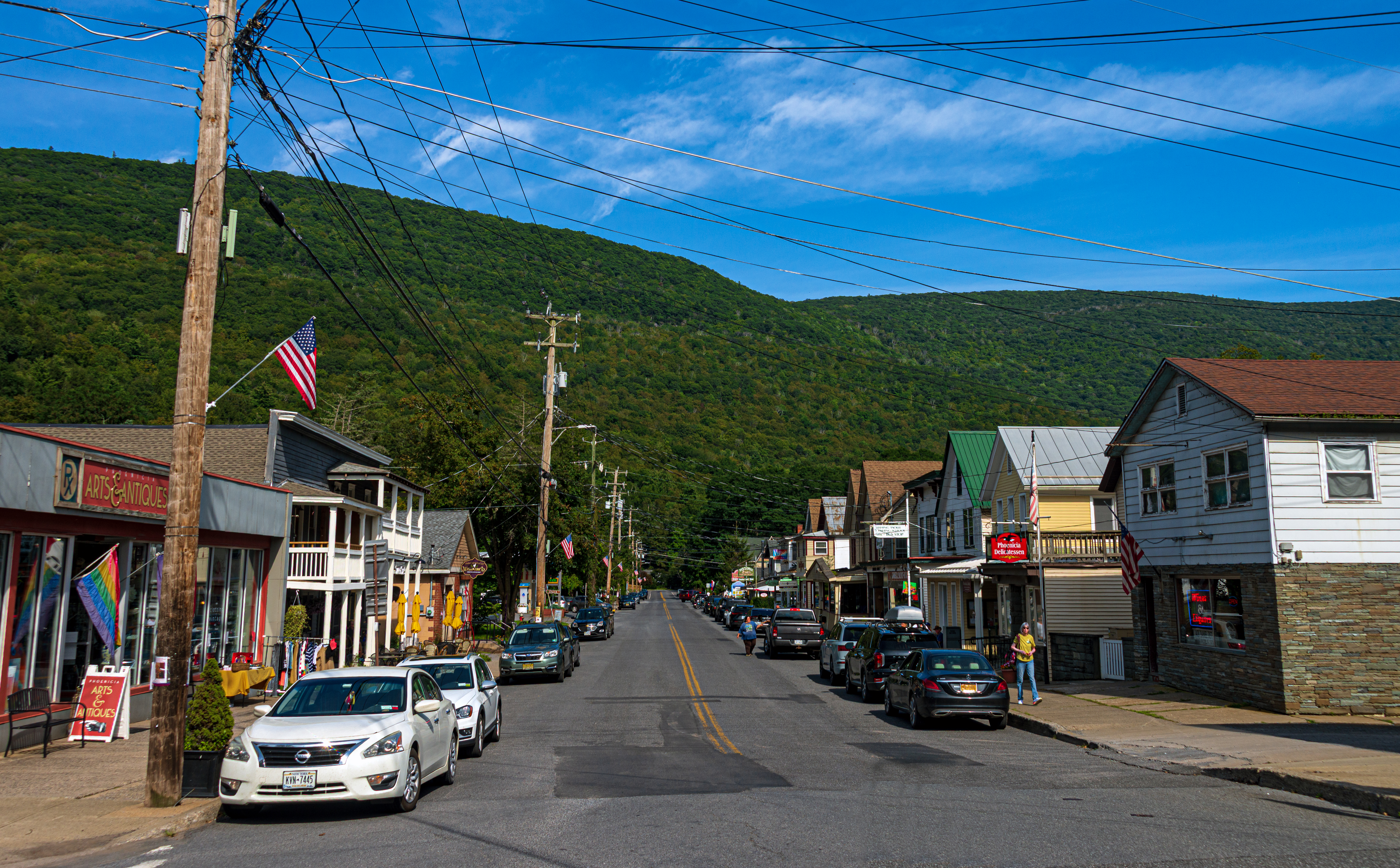
- View along Main Street
- Etymology: From Phoenix tannery
- Location in Ulster County and the state of New York.
- Coordinates: 42°4′53″N 74°18′47″W
- Country: United States
- State: New York
- Region: Catskills
- County: Ulster

Area
  - Total: 0.46 sq mi (1.18 km^{2})
  - Land: 0.46 sq mi (1.18 km^{2})
  - Water: 0 sq mi (0.00 km^{2})
- Elevation: 827 ft (252 m)

Population (2020)
  - Total: 268
  - Density: 588.7/sq mi (227.31/km^{2})
- Time zone: UTC-5 (EST)
  - Summer (DST): UTC-4 (EDT)
- ZIP Code: 12464
- Area code: 845
- Exchange: 688
- FIPS code: 36-57650
- GNIS feature ID: 0960320

Phoenicia is a hamlet (and census-designated place) of Shandaken in Ulster County, New York, United States. The population was 268 at the 2020 census, making it the second highest populated community in the town. The village center is located just off Route 28 at its junction with Route 214 and is nestled at the base of three peaks, Mount Tremper, Romer Mountain, and Sheridan Mountain. The community sits at the confluence of the Esopus Creek and Stony Clove Creek. A popular getaway for New Yorkers, the hamlet has frequented many tourism guides as among the best vacation towns in the greater New York City area.

== History ==
The geographic area that would eventually be named Phoenicia was fertile hunting and fishing land for the Mohawk, Mohican, and Lenape peoples for hundreds of years before European settlers arrived. Of particular note are the Esopus Lenape, who are believed to be the people who spent the most time in the area.

The first European settlement in the area is believed to be in the mid-18th century, as Ulster county as a whole began to see more European immigration and land access in the more fertile lower valleys became restricted. These access restrictions particularly began to push poorer subsistence farmers into the Catskill Mountains. Most of these early settlers were of Dutch, English, and Scottish origin, with Dutch being the most commonly spoken European language.

The 19th century saw industry move into the area, with tanning becoming the dominant employer early and eventually ceding to bluestone quarrying towards the latter half of the century. This era saw the decline of Dutch cultural dominance.

The hamlet housed the Phoenix Tannery from 1836 until it closed around 1870, eventually burning down in 1873. The Phoenix, along with most of the new industry in the area, primarily employed recent Irish immigrants and was at different times known as the Newkirk and Simpson Tannery, Simpson Tannery, Simpson's Tannery, and Edinburg Tannery. Many believe the Phoenix Tannery is the source of the hamlet's name.

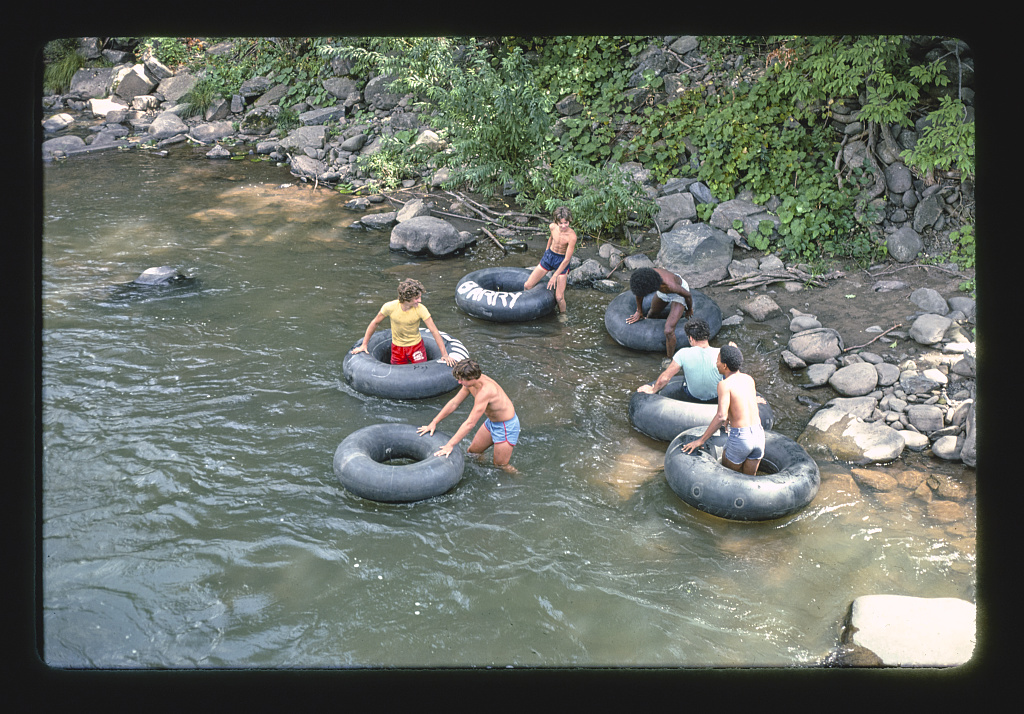
Tubing on the Esopus Creek in Phoenicia (1978)

As the extractive industries of tanning and quarrying began to wane in the region towards the latter half of the 1800s, tourism began to take off with Phoenicia a major center. An 1879 article from the New York Times, "In The Ulster Catskills: Attractions of Shandaken Valley", notes "many thousands of people will come [to the Catskills] annually to escape the heat of the pent-up cities, and spend some of their hard-earned money in gaining renewed strength and vigor of body and mind."

The Ulster and Delaware Railroad arrived at this community first, making it the first to develop the tourist industry which is still a major part of the local economy. The New York Central Railroad acquired the railroad on February 1, 1932. It continued passenger service through the development, albeit only once-daily except Sundays in its final years. That service ended on March 31, 1954.

In 1960, the Empire State Railway Museum opened in the historic Ulster & Delaware Phoenicia Railroad Station.

On August 23, 1986, Phoenicia became the home of The Shandaken Eagle, a two-ton cast-iron eagle with a 13 foot wingspan who originally lived atop New York City's Grand Central Depot.

The Phoenicia Railroad Station was listed on the National Register of Historic Places in 1995.

Beginning in 2010, the town hosted the Phoenicia International Festival of the Voice every August. It has moved to New Paltz.

== Geography ==
Phoenicia is located at 42°4′53″N 74°18′47″W (42.081266, -74.313019).

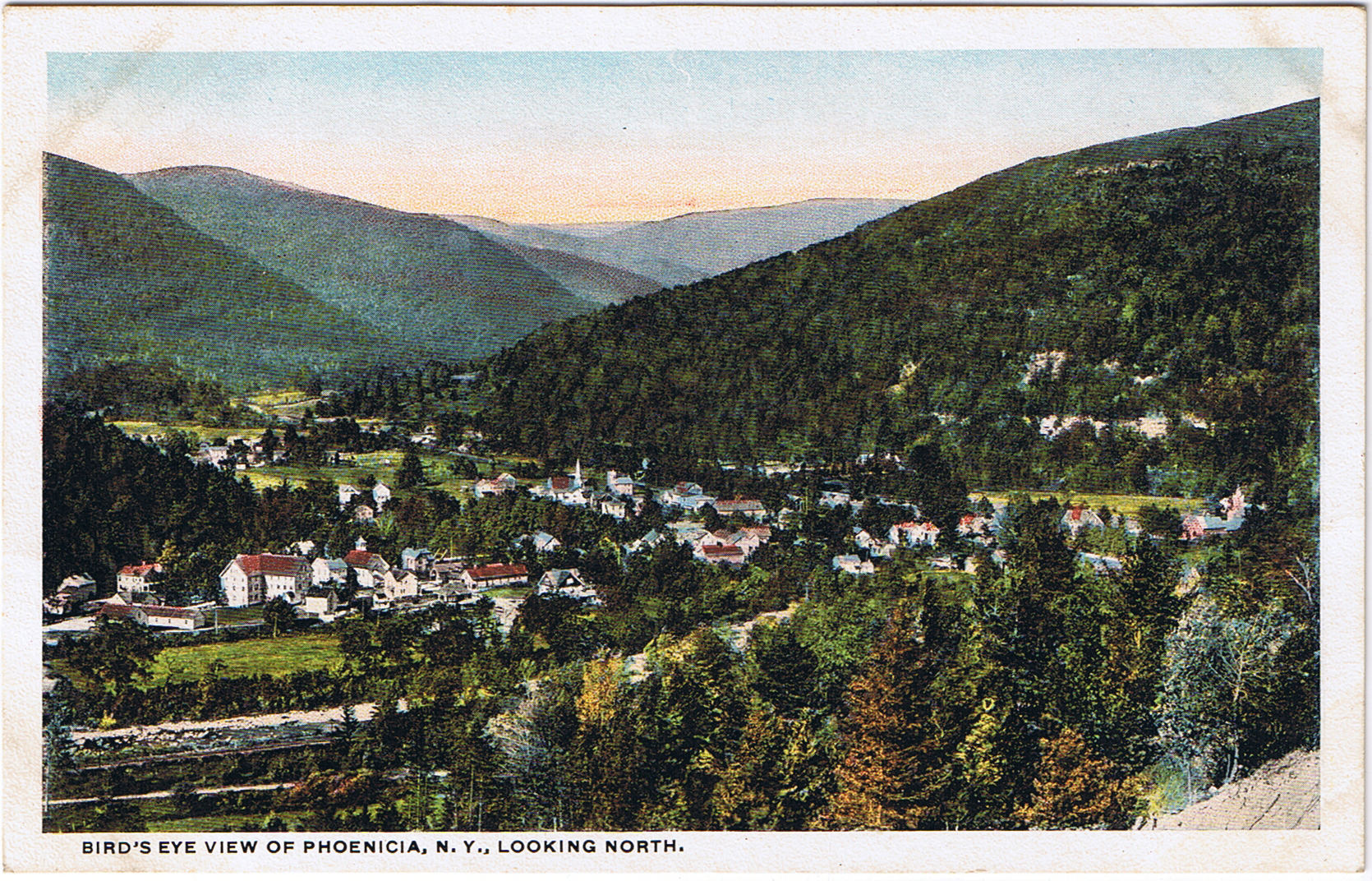
View of Phoenicia, 1910s

According to the United States Census Bureau, the CDP has a total area of 0.5 square miles (1.3 km^{2}), all land.

== Demographics ==
Historical population
Census	Pop.	Note	%±
2000	381		—
2010	309		−18.9%
2020	268		−13.3%
U.S. Decennial Census

As of the census of 2000, there were 381 people, 194 households, and 82 families residing in the CDP. The population density was 823.2 inhabitants per square mile (317.8/km^{2}). There were 246 housing units at an average density of 531.5 per square mile (205.2/km^{2}). The racial makeup of the CDP was 96.06% White, 0.26% African American, 0.52% Native American, 0.26% Asian, 0.26% Pacific Islander, and 2.62% from two or more races. Hispanic or Latino of any race were 2.62% of the population.

There were 194 households, out of which 20.1% had children under the age of 18 living with them, 26.8% were married couples living together, 10.3% had a female householder with no husband present, and 57.7% were non-families. 45.4% of all households were made up of individuals, and 23.7% had someone living alone who was 65 years of age or older. The average household size was 1.96 and the average family size was 2.88.

In the CDP, the population was spread out, with 18.1% under the age of 18, 5.8% from 18 to 24, 24.4% from 25 to 44, 28.6% from 45 to 64, and 23.1% who were 65 years of age or older. The median age was 46 years. For every 100 females, there were 87.7 males. For every 100 females age 18 and over, there were 85.7 males.

The median income for a household in the CDP was $22,159, and the median income for a family was $28,000. Males had a median income of $29,250 versus $21,750 for females. The per capita income for the CDP was $15,408. About 5.7% of families and 13.9% of the population were below the poverty line, including none of those under age 18 and 20.5% of those age 65 or over.

The Zip Code for Phoenicia is 12464, and the Area code is 845.

== Education ==
The school district is Onteora Central School District.

== Pop Culture ==
The 1992 music video for the B-52s song "Is that You, Mo-Dean?" was filmed in Phoenicia.
