= Otis Elevating Railway =

Narrow gauge cable funicular railroad

Map

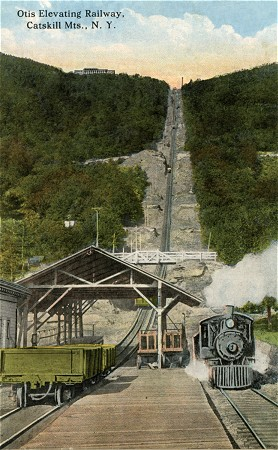
The Otis Junction Station after the railroad's reconstruction in 1904.

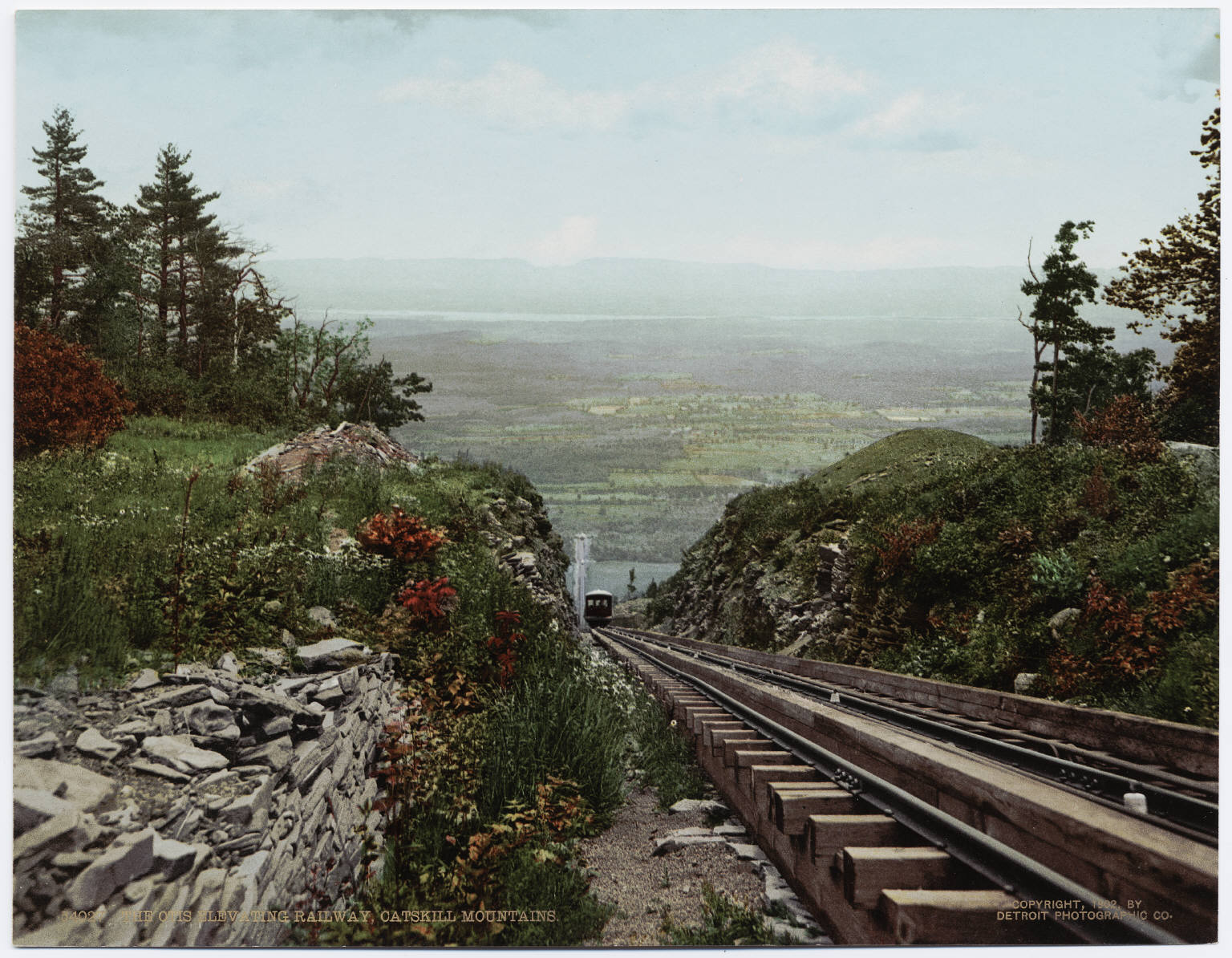
Otis Elevating Railway, ca. 1900

The Otis Elevating Railway was a 3 ft (914 mm) narrow gauge cable funicular railroad leading to the Catskill Mountain House in Palenville, New York. For the first 64 years of its existence, the Catskill Mountain House was accessible only by a long stagecoach from Catskill Landing on the Hudson.

== History ==
Faced with increased competition from the Hotel Kaaterskill (served by the Kaaterskill Railroad), Catskill Mountain House owner Charles Beach hired the Otis Elevator Company to build a cable funicular railroad straight up the Great Wall of Manitou. Opening on August 7, 1892, the line measured 7,000 ft (2,134 m) long with a rise of 1,630 ft (497 m), a maximum grade of 34%, and an average grade of 12%. In 1904, the line was shortened and the lower trestle eliminated. According to the New York Times in 1892, a trip from New York City which previously took 5 or 6 hours, took 3 hours and 12 minutes thanks to the railway.

A cable pulled the specially designed passenger cars up the mountain, hooking a mechanism from the car onto the cable. To balance the system there were two cars which could each seat 75 passengers. The cars were built by Jackson & Sharp Co. in 1892. The cars were named Rickerson and Van Santvoord. A small open-air baggage car was coupled to the downhill end of each passenger car.

In April, 1899, the Otis Elevating Railway was sold for $10,000 in a foreclosure proceeding. In August 1899, the owners of the Otis Elevating Railway announced plans to build an electric railroad from Saugerties, New York to the town of Catskill.

== Design ==
The cable was pulled by two Hamilton Corliss steam engines that spun a set of cogwheels that drove the cable. Each engine had a 12-inch (304.8 mm) diameter bore and a 30-inch (762 mm) stroke. Steam was supplied by two Manning Patent vertical tubular boilers. As one car went up from the bottom of the incline, the other car went down from the top of the incline. There was a passing track in the middle of the run where the track split in two and then rejoined. This was so the cars could pass each other without colliding, as they shared the center rail above and below the passing track.

The Otis Railway and the Catskill Mountain Railway had several freight cars interchangeable with both the Catskill and Tannersville Railway at Summit Station and the Catskill Mountain Railway at Junction Station. The freight cars were 22 feet (6.71 m) long and had a capacity of 5 or 8 short tons (4.46 or 7.14 long tons; 4.54 or 7.26 t). One car could be carried at a time coupled below the coach. Boxcars were Otis Ry. 1, Otis Ry. 2, C.M. Ry. 17 & C.M. Ry. 18. Gondolas were Otis Ry. 3, Otis Ry. 4, C.M. Ry. 15 & C.M. Ry. 16. In operation, a single freight car could be coupled to the downhill end of the open-air baggage car.

== Stations ==
The Otis Junction station (pictured right after the 1904 reconstruction) connected the Otis to the Catskill Mountain Railway, a 15-mile (24 km) railroad between Catskill Landing and Palenville, New York. At the Otis Summit station at the top, it connected to the Catskill and Tannersville Railway, that ran the 5.2 miles (8.4 km) to Tannersville. In 1918, all three railroads were closed and sold for scrap. The two cars survive to this day. Soon after the railroad was scrapped, the coaches were shipped to Chattanooga, Tennessee, where they served the Lookout Mountain Incline Railway.

== See also ==
- List of funicular railways
