= Catskill Mountain Railway =

Railroad in New York (1882–1918)

Map

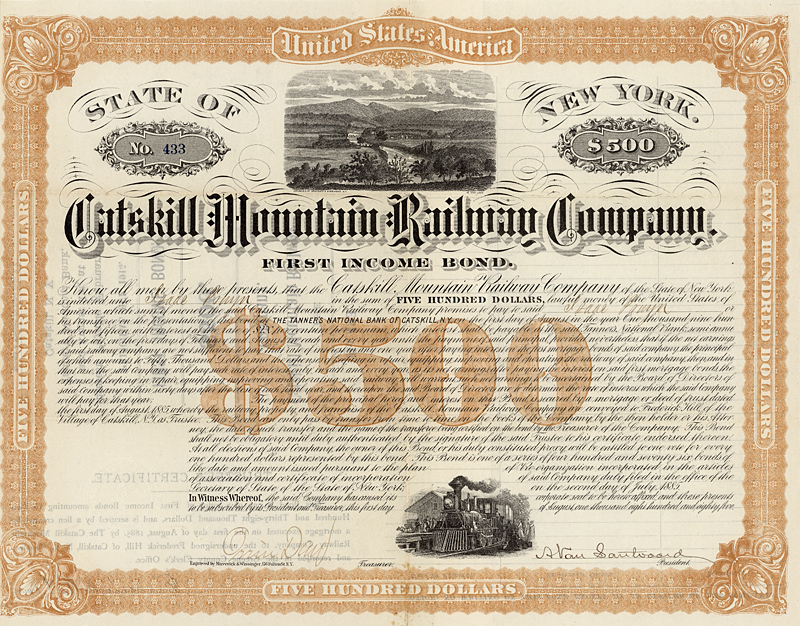
Bond of the Catskill Mountain Railway from the 2nd July 1885

The Catskill Mountain Railway (CMRy) was a 3 ft (914 mm) narrow gauge railroad, 15.73 miles (25.31 km) long, running from Catskill to Palenville in Greene County, New York. Organized as the Catskill Mountain Railroad (CMRR) in 1880, it was built in 1881 and 1882. The principals had interests in shipping on the Hudson and in hotels in the Catskill Mountains.

Unlike most railroads, the CMRR was built primarily for the purpose of transporting passengers and was intended to operate seasonally. Most people using the line were summer tourists who travelled by steamboat from points along the Hudson River. Their final destinations were hotels and boarding houses located high in the Catskill Mountains. While the railroad served its purpose of bringing passengers closer to the mountain top resorts, it still left them with an arduous hour-long stage trip up the face of the Catskill Escarpment (also known as the Wall of Manitou). In 1885 a branch was built in Cairo, New York, with the intent to carry bluestone, hay and fruit, and was run year round. That same year, the CMRR was reorganized as the Catskill Mountain Railway.

== Competition ==
Competition soon arose, in the form of the Stony Clove & Catskill Mountain and the Kaaterskill railroad companies, both controlled by the Ulster and Delaware Railroad. These narrow gauge railroads brought passengers much closer to their final destinations, saving them the difficult stage trip CMRR patrons had. To counter the competition, the Otis Elevating Railway was formed, hiring the company of Elisha Otis's sons to build a cable railroad. This railroad was completed in 1892. 7,000 feet (2,100 m) in length, it raised passengers 1,600 feet (490 m) in 10 minutes - saving a one-hour stage ride. At the summit, 1-mile (1.6 km) of track was laid to connect with the terminus of the Kaaterskill Railroad.

By 1897 connecting service on the Kaaterskill Railroad had become so bad, that a new railroad, the Catskill and Tannersville Railway was constructed to run from the Otis to Tannersville. This line paralleled the existing Katterskill one as far as Tannersville. Hastily built, this line had curves as sharp as 20 degrees and a maximum speed of 7 miles per hour. Locally, it was affectionately known as the "Huckleberry" for the fruit which grew along its way.

During a 1904 reconstruction of the Otis, a switch was installed to connect with the C&T permitting through freight to operate from Catskill to Tannersville. Because of the slanted seats necessary on the Otis, passengers still had to change cars.

A great boon to the CMRR was the development of the shale brick in 1888 by the Elmira Shale Brick Company. By 1898, raw material mined on the Cairo branch for the Catskill Shale brick company comprised, by tonnage, 95% of the freight carried.

The last trains were run in 1918.

== Route ==
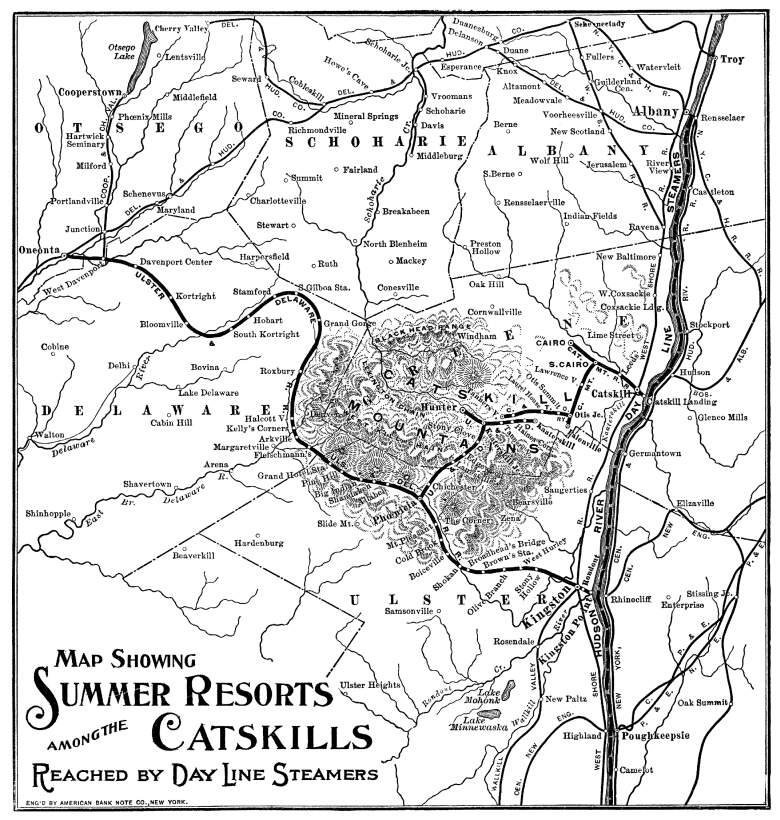
Catskill Mountain RR's route is on the northeast edge of the Catskills region on the map

The train route ran from Cairo, southeast to Catskill and then Catskill Landing. Catskill provided a connection to the New York Central's West Shore Railroad trains from Albany to Weehawken, New Jersey. The Catskill Landing location provided a connection for boats across the Hudson River to Hudson, New York. Service between Cairo Junction and Palenville and Otis Summit on the C&T Railway was available in the summer months only.

== Locomotives ==
Number	Name	Builder	Type	Date	Shop No.	Notes
1	S. Sherwood Day	Dickson Manufacturing Company	4-4-0	1882	335	
2	John T. Mann	Dickson Manufacturing Company	4-4-0	1882	336	
3	Charles T. Van Santvoord	Dickson Manufacturing Company	4-4-0	1885	522	Retired in 1911.
4	Charles L. Beach	Schenectady Locomotive Works	4-4-0	1895	4333	Burned in 1908. Boiler used on #2.
2nd #4	Charles L. Beach	ALCO Schenectady	4-4-0	1909	46645	Sold in 1920 to Oak Grove and Georgetown Railroad.
5	Alfred Van Santvoord	ALCO Rogers	4-4-0	1912	51126	Sold in 1920 to Oak Grove and Georgetown Railroad.

== Passenger Cars ==
Number	Builder	Type	Date	Capacity	Notes
1	Jackson & Sharp	baggage car	1882	12 tons	Sold in 1920 to Ferrocarriles Nacionales de México.
2	Jackson & Sharp	baggage car	1882	12 tons	Sold in 1920 to Ferrocarriles Nacionales de México.
3	Jackson & Sharp	baggage car	1882	12 tons	Sold in 1920 to Ferrocarriles Nacionales de México.
4	Jackson & Sharp	baggage car	1882	12 tons	Sold in 1920 to Ferrocarriles Nacionales de México.
5	Jackson & Sharp	coach	1882	50 seats	Sold in 1920 to Ferrocarriles Nacionales de México.
6	Jackson & Sharp	coach	1882	44 seats	Sold in 1920 to Ferrocarriles Nacionales de México.
7	Jackson & Sharp	coach	1882	44 seats	Sold in 1920 to Ferrocarriles Nacionales de México.
8	Jackson & Sharp	coach	1882	44 seats	Sold in 1920 to Ferrocarriles Nacionales de México.
9	Jackson & Sharp	coach	1882	52 seats	Sold in 1920 to Ferrocarriles Nacionales de México.
10	Jackson & Sharp	coach	1882	52 seats	Sold in 1920 to Ferrocarriles Nacionales de México.
11	Jackson & Sharp	coach	1882	52 seats	Sold in 1920 to Ferrocarriles Nacionales de México.
12	Jackson & Sharp	excursion car	1882	longitudinal bench seats	Sold in 1920 to Ferrocarriles Nacionales de México.
13	Jackson & Sharp	excursion car	1882	longitudinal bench seats	Sold in 1920 to Ferrocarriles Nacionales de México.
14	Jackson & Sharp	excursion car	1882	longitudinal bench seats	Sold in 1920 to Ferrocarriles Nacionales de México.
15	Jackson & Sharp	coach	1893	46 seats	Sold in 1920 to Ferrocarriles Nacionales de México.
16	Jackson & Sharp	coach	1893	46 seats	Sold in 1920 to Ferrocarriles Nacionales de México.

== Freight Cars ==
Number	Builder	Type	Date	Capacity	Notes
1	Jackson & Sharp	flatcar	1882	12 short tons (10.7 long tons; 10.9 t)	30 feet (9.14 m) long.
2	Jackson & Sharp	flatcar	1882	12 tons	30 feet long.
3	Jackson & Sharp	flatcar	1882	12 tons	30 feet long.
4	Jackson & Sharp	gondola	1882	12 tons	30 feet long.
5	Jackson & Sharp	flatcar	1882	12 tons	30 feet long.
6	Jackson & Sharp	flatcar	1882	12 tons	30 feet long.
7	Jackson & Sharp	gondola	1882	12 tons	31 feet (9.45 m) long.
8	Jackson & Sharp	gondola	1882	12 tons	31 feet long.
9	Jackson & Sharp	flatcar	1882	12 tons	31 feet long.
10	Jackson & Sharp	gondola	1882	12 tons	31 feet long.
11	Jackson & Sharp	boxcar	1882	12 tons	30 feet long.
12	Jackson & Sharp	boxcar	1882	12 tons	Converted to 24-foot (7.32 m) caboose by railroad.
13	Jackson & Sharp	boxcar	1893	12 tons	24 feet long.
14	Jackson & Sharp	boxcar	1893	12 tons	24 feet long.
15	Catskill Mountain Ry.	gondola	1906 or 1907	8 tons	22 feet (6.71 m) long. Built for interchange with Otis Ry. and Catskill & Tannersville Ry.
16	Catskill Mountain Ry.	gondola	1906 or 1907	8 tons	22 feet long. Built for interchange with Otis Ry. and Catskill & Tannersville Ry.
17	Catskill Mountain Ry.	boxcar	1908 or 1909	8 tons	22 feet long. Built for interchange with Otis Ry. and Catskill & Tannersville Ry.
18	Catskill Mountain Ry.	boxcar	1908 or 1909	8 tons	22 feet long. Built for interchange with Otis Ry. and Catskill & Tannersville Ry.
