= Pine Hill station =

Coordinates: 42°7′59″N 74°29′10″W

Pine Hill

General information
- Location: Pine Hill, Ulster County. New York
- Tracks: 1

History
- Closed: March 31, 1954

Services
Preceding station	New York Central Railroad	Following station
Grand Hotel toward Oneonta	Catskill Mountain Branch	Big Indian toward Kingston Point

Pine Hill station, MP 39.7 on the Ulster and Delaware Railroad (U&D), served the village of Pine Hill, New York. It was constructed on the slope of Belle Ayr Mountain 100 feet above the village along the steep grade running from Big Indian to the summit at Grand Hotel station. The famous double horseshoe curves on the U&D were located just west of the station.

Pine Hill has a large spring and for many years large quantities of bottled water were shipped from here. This station was abandoned after the end of passenger service on the U&D, which occurred on March 31, 1954, and was soon torn down because it was in such bad condition. It was on the same hill that now stands next to the artificial Pine Hill Lake.

The railroad tracks next to the former station site were once leased to the Catskill Mountain Railroad, and were cleared of brush and vegetation in June 2006. In July, the North American Railcar Operators Association sponsored a track-speeder meet on the Delaware and Ulster Railroad that was extended to Pine Hill: the first rail traffic to reach the station site in nearly 30 years. The former U&D/NYC tracks are now (2022) permanently out of service, with several major washouts along Esopus Creek, between the Ulster County line at Highmount and a point just east of West Hurley.
