= Railroad speeder =

Small railcar for inspectors and work crews

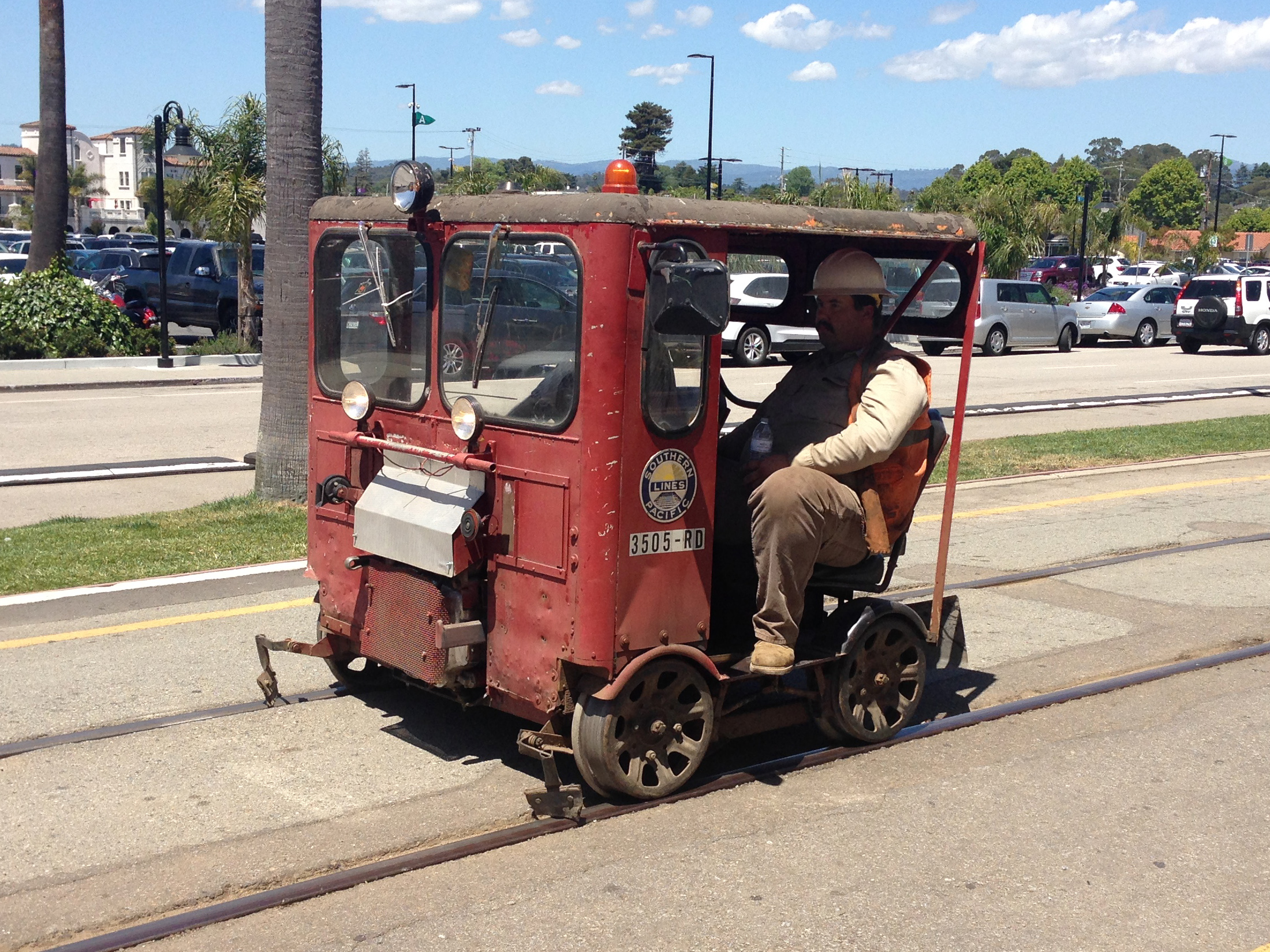
Speeder in use in Santa Cruz, California

A speeder (also known as a section car, railway motor car, putt-putt, track-maintenance car, crew car, jigger, trike, quad, personnel carrier, trolley, inspection car, or draisine) is a small railcar used around the world by track inspectors and work crews to move quickly to and from work sites. Although slow compared to a train or car, it is called speeder because it is faster than a human-powered vehicle such as a handcar. Motorized inspection cars date back to at least 1895, when the Kalamazoo Manufacturing Company started building gasoline-engined inspection cars.

In the 1990s, many speeders were replaced by pickup trucks or sport utility vehicles with additional flanged wheels that could be lowered for travelling on rails, called "road–rail vehicles" or hi-rails for "highway-railroad". Speeders are collected by hobbyists, who refurbish them for excursions organized by the North American Railcar Operators Association in the U.S. and Canada and the Australian Society of Section Car Operators, Inc. in Australia.

== Motorcar manufacturers and models ==
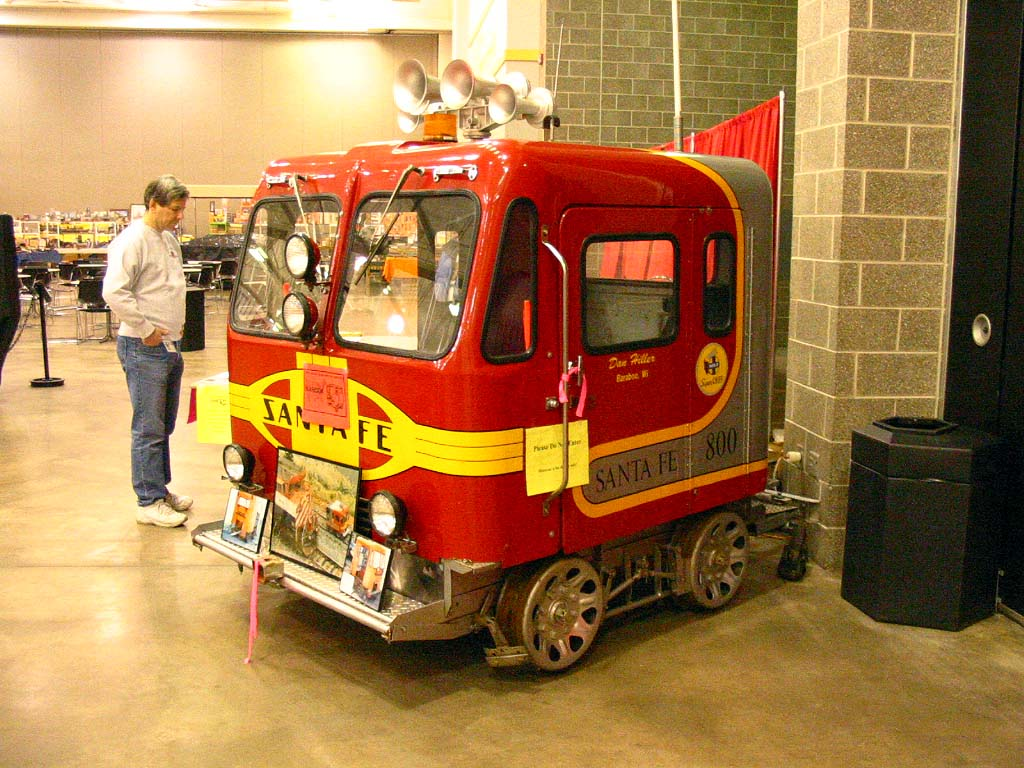
A privately owned Fairmont MT-14 speeder on display at a model railroad show in February 2004

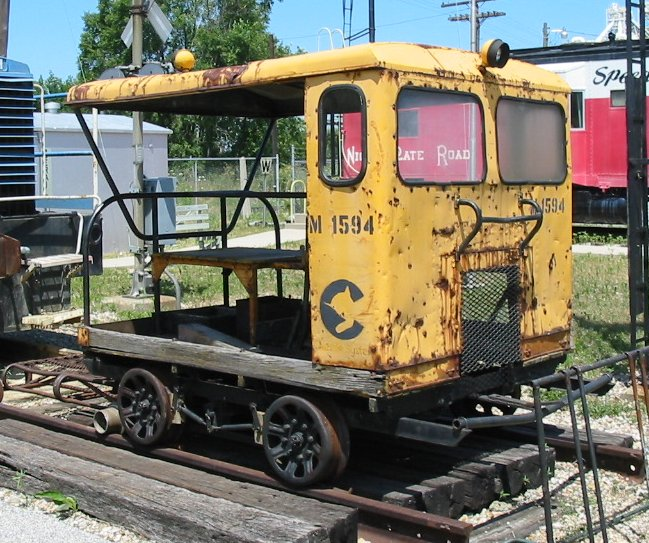
A former Chessie System speeder at the Linden Railroad Museum, Linden, Indiana

| United States | Canada |
|---|---|
| Beavercar (BMC-2m BMC-4m BMC-B); Buda; Casey Jones (531); Fairbanks-Morse (40-B, 101, 757); Fairmont Railway Motors Inc (Note: Fairmont used three letters to designate car types. "S" was a Standard Series" section car; "A" was an "Advanced Series" section car and "M" was the "Master Series" section car. They also used a "category" name for motorcars. "Light Inspection" or 1-2 men, were car models: M9 nicknamed "Safe Easy", MM9, MR9, 59, M17, and MM17. "Inspection" or 1-4 men, were models "Roadmaster", M12, M16, M19 nicknamed the Safety Quick", MT19, and the 150. "Light Section" or 1-6 men, the M1, and M14 also called the "Light Section Car". "Section" or 1-8 men, were models "Dreadnaught", M2, 75, and S2. "Heavy Duty Section" or 1-8 men, the A2. "Gang" or 1-12 men, MT2, ST2, A2, AT2 and A3. "Extra Gang" or "B & B" 1-12 men, MX3, MX30G, MT2, A4, AF4, and A6. Final group, "Large Extra Gang" or "Hump" 1-12 men, models A6, A7, A8.); S2, S2-A, S9, S9, S9-A, S9-B, S9-C S9-D; 1100 2100 3100 4100 5100 6100; A2-A8 Series; M2 M9 M14 MT14 M15 M17 M19 MT19; S2 ST2 C7 CD7 CK7 CR7; Gibson Manufacturing Corporation; Kalamazoo; 23 Series B, 23 Series T, 27, 560N; Portec; Sheffield; 40-B | Sylvester Steel Products; "21" section car with "120" engine (steel frame); "21E" section car with "KP" engine (aluminum frame); "K54" inspection car with "KP" engine (aluminum frame); Tamper; TMC-2, TMC-6, TMC-8, TMC-12; D Wickham & Co Ltd; Wickham trolley; Woodings; CBI, CBL; Railway Workshops |

Various railways and their workshops also manufactured speeders. Often these were a copy of commercially available cars, such as Wickham and Fairmont.

== Dimensions ==
Approximate dimensions of a common speeder car are given below. Due to the variety of base models and customization these are not fixed numbers. These values are from a Fairmont A4-D.

- Rail gauge: 1,435 mm (4 ft 8 1/2 in) standard gauge (56.5 inches)
- Weight: 3,500 pounds (1,588 kg)
- Width: 64 inches (1,626 mm)
- Height: 60 inches (1,524 mm)
- Length: 9 feet 2 inches (2,794 mm) (~110 inches)
- Wheel diameter: 16 inches (406 mm)
- Floor height: 80–120% of the wheel diameter; 11 inches (279 mm)-17 inches (432 mm)

== In popular culture ==
Sandy from Thomas & Friends: All Engines Go is an anthropomorphic rail speeder.

The 1965 Canadian comedy short film The Railrodder involves a cross-country journey by speeder.

== Gallery ==
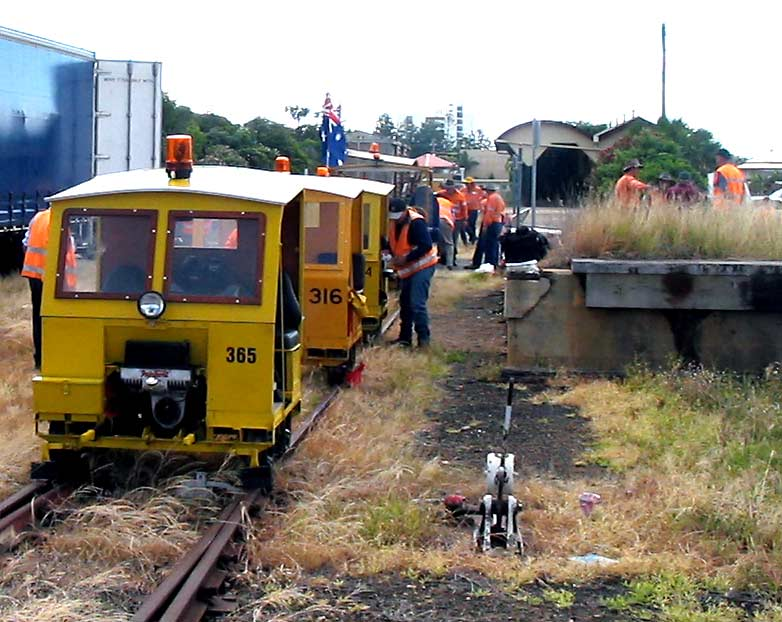
Former Queensland Rail (Australia) speeders

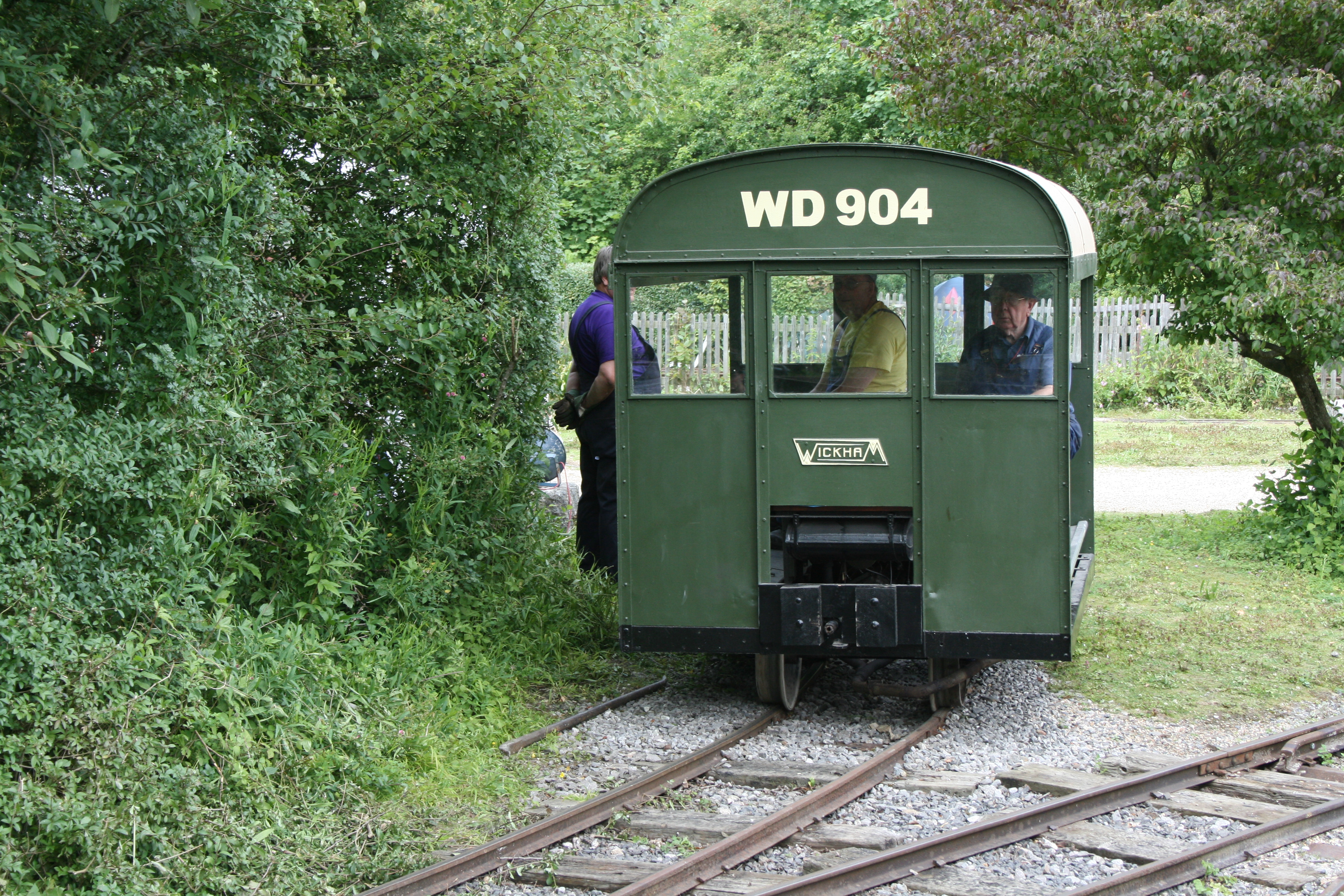
A former UK MOD railway engineering personnel carrier (Wickham trolley)

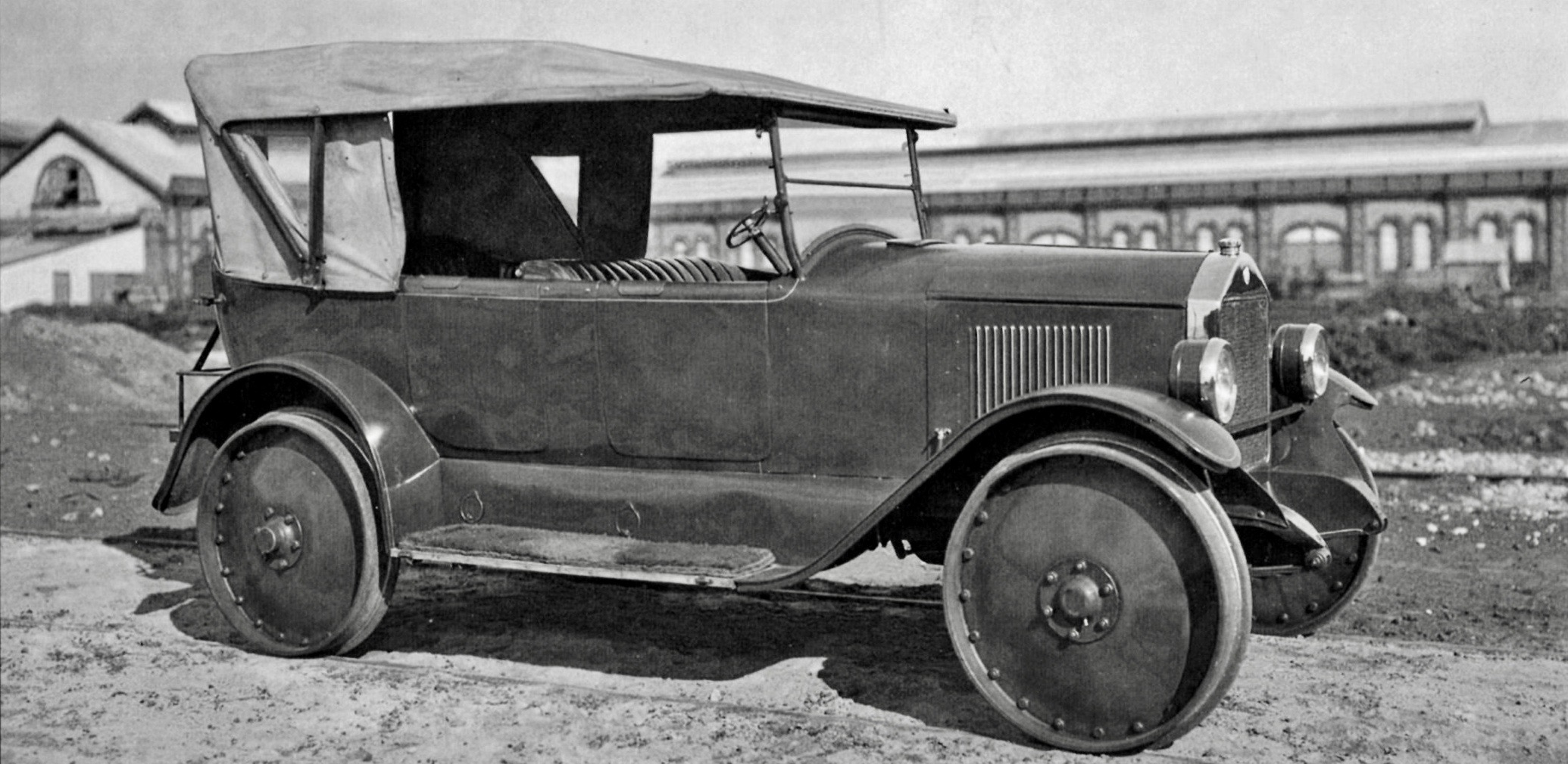
Dort tourer modified by the South Australian Railways in the 1920s to be a motor inspection car

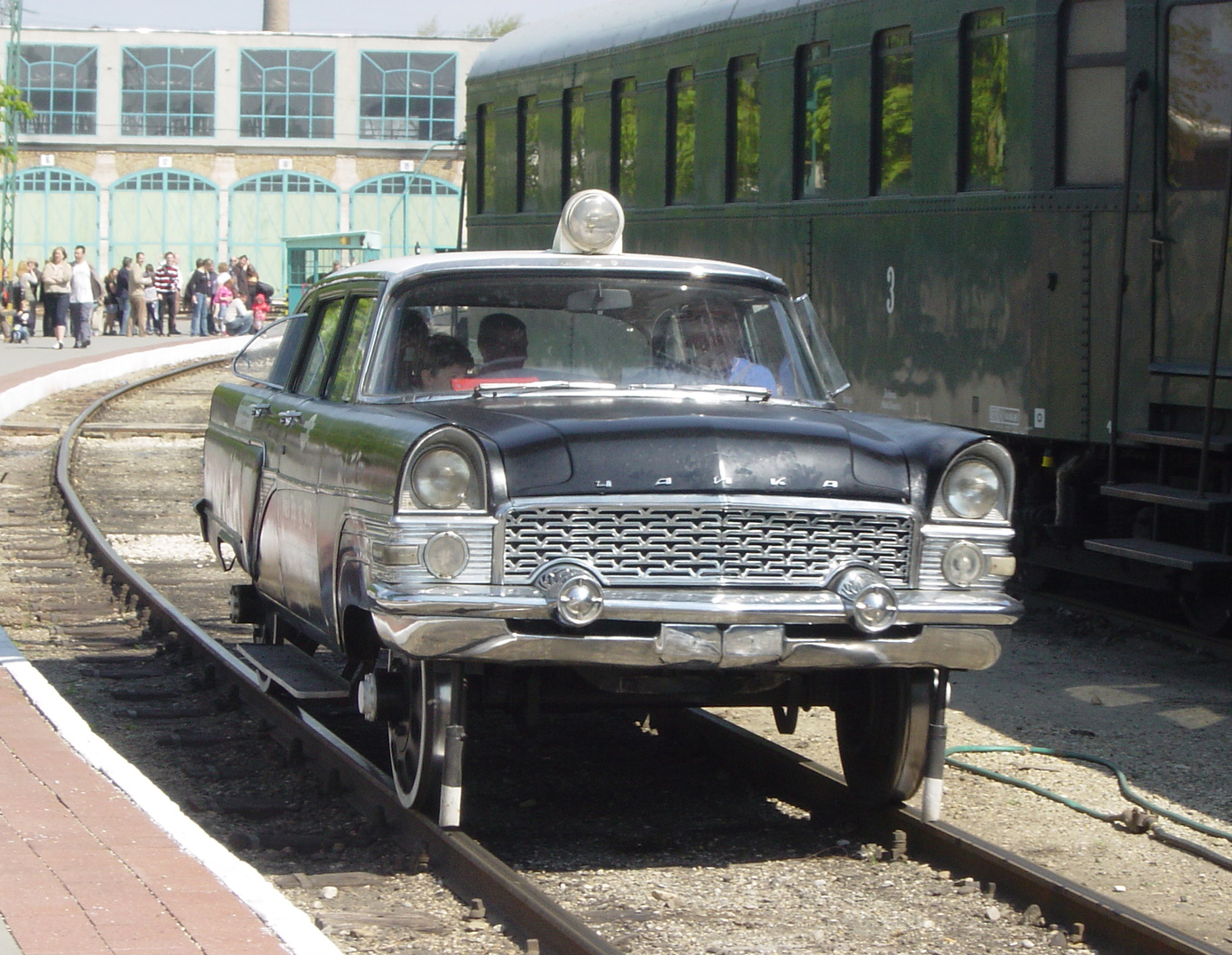
Russian GAZ-13 Chaika car converted to a speeder, preserved at the Hungarian Railway Museum

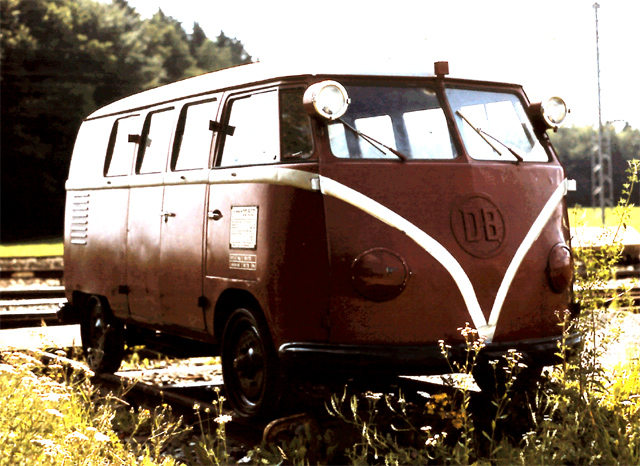
Deutsche Bundesbahn speeder based on the Volkswagen Type 2 light commercial vehicle

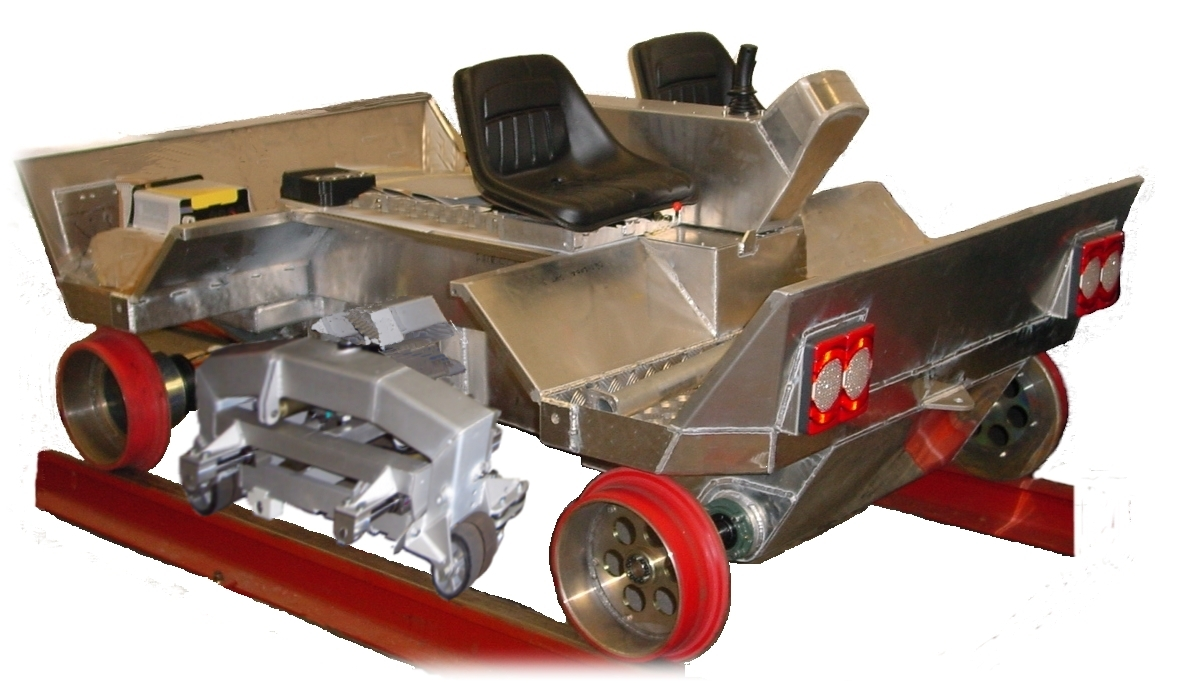
A battery-powered ultrasonic rail flaw detector trolley made at the Centre For Advanced Transport Engineering and Research, Western Australia

== See also ==
- Cater MetroTrolley
- Draisine
- Handcar
- North American Railcar Operators Association
- Railbus
- Railcar
- Road-rail vehicle
- The Railrodder
