= Big Indian station =

Coordinates: 42°06′09″N 074°26′43″W

Big Indian
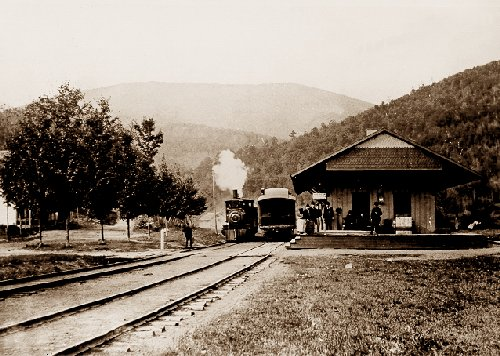
- The former station depot at Big Indian.

General information
- Location: Shandaken, Ulster County. New York
- Tracks: 1

History
- Closed: March 31, 1954

Services
Preceding station	New York Central Railroad	Following station
Pine Hill toward Oneonta	Catskill Mountain Branch	Shandaken toward Kingston Point
Location

The station at Big Indian, MP 36.4, was another Ulster and Delaware Railroad station. It served the town of Big Indian, New York, and was at the bottom of the Pine Hill Grade. At this stop, a second or third locomotive was coupled to the train to help it up the grade to Grand Hotel station. A water tower was located here along with a turntable for turning steam locomotives.

This station saw its last train in 1954, when the station was closed down and abandoned. This station survived until being razed by the State of New York during the reconstruction of Route 28 in the late 1960s. All that is left on the station grounds that shows that anything was there is a rather barren area next to the Big Indian Post Office. A careful observer can also locate the base of the old water tower south of the railroad and west of Route 28.

The tracks that run adjacent to the former station site are now leased to the Catskill Mountain Railroad.
