= Handcar =

Railroad car powered by its passengers

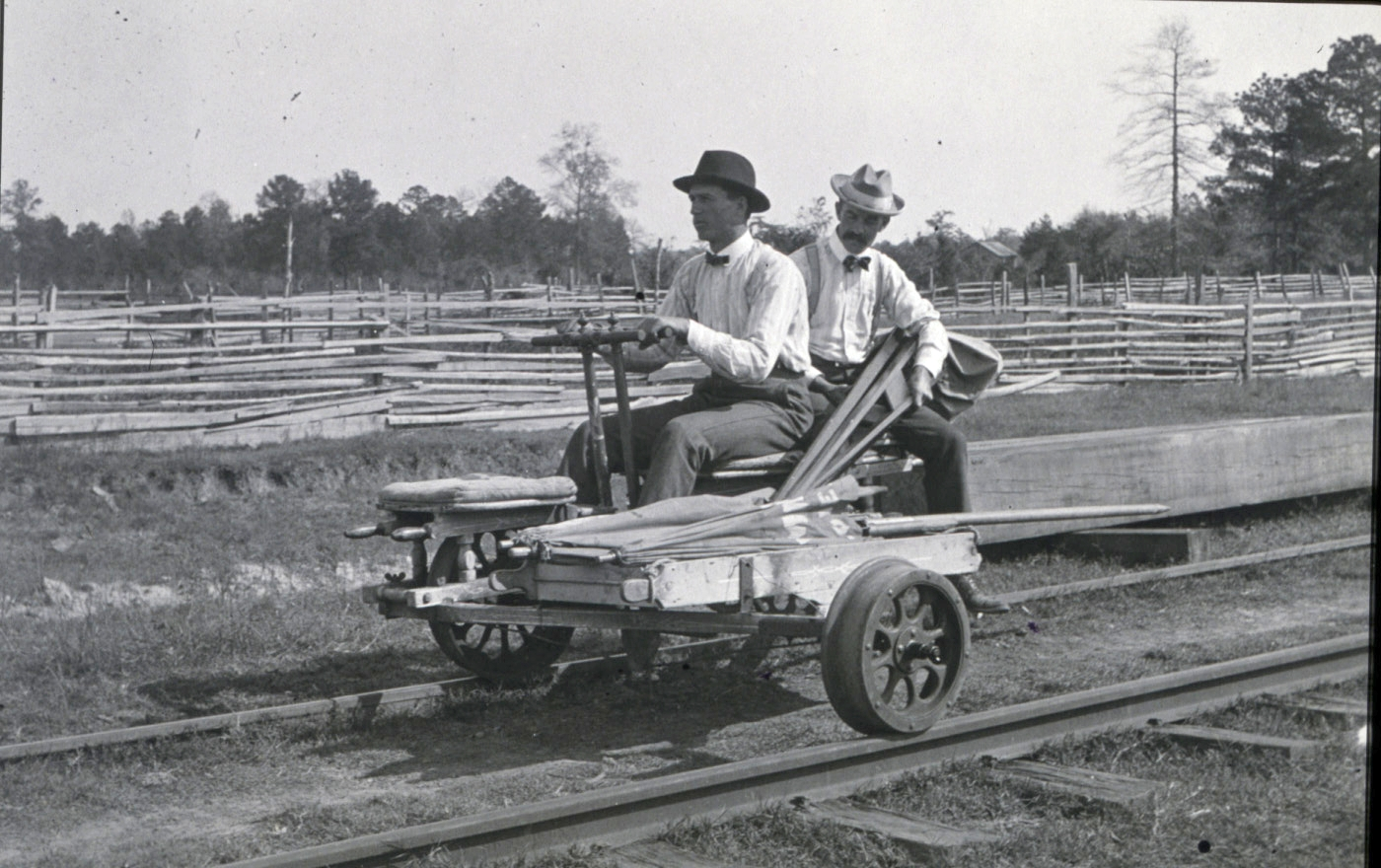
3-wheeled handcar or velocipede on a railroad track

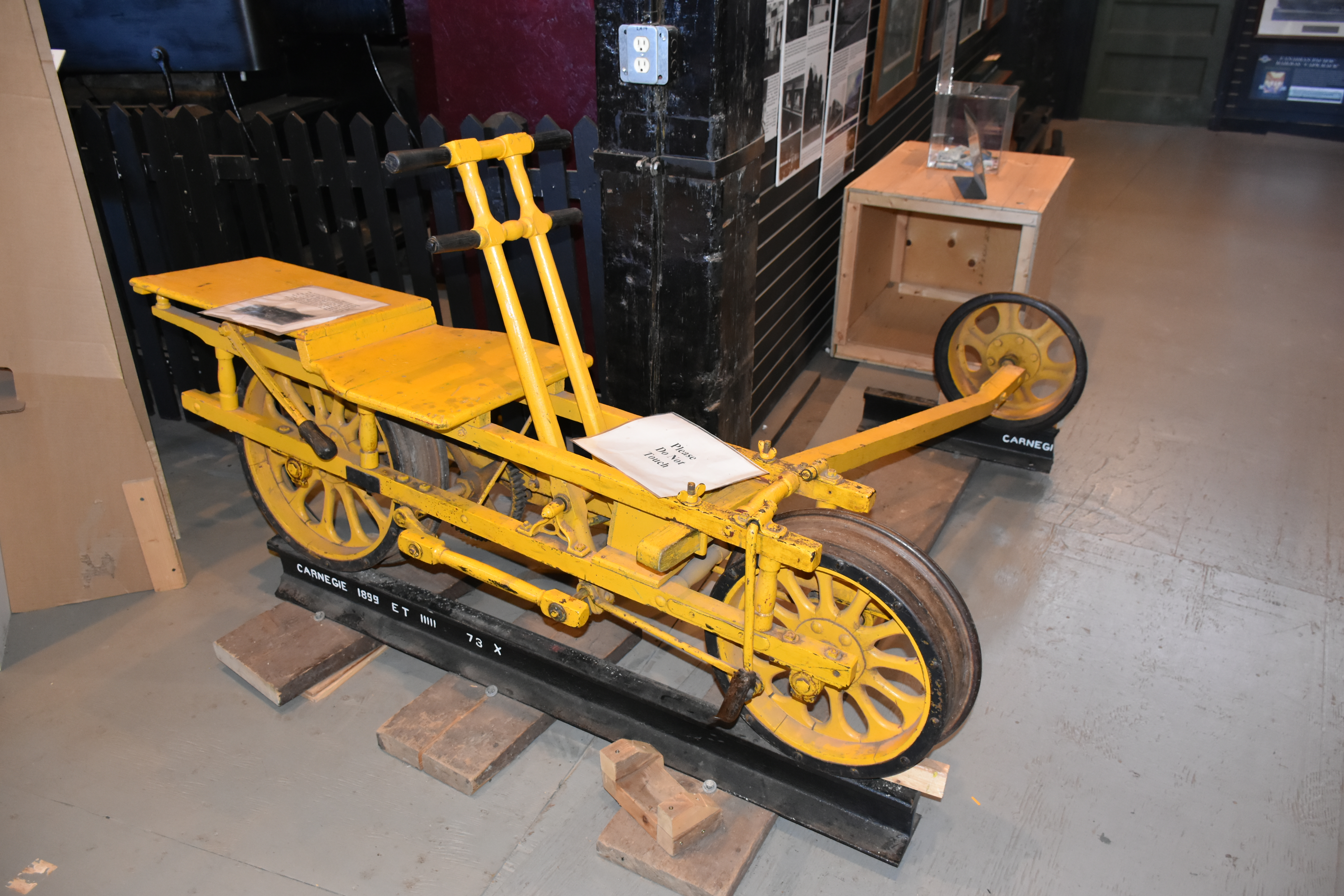
Preserved railroad velocipede on exhibit at the Toronto Railway Historical Association

A handcar (also known as a pump trolley, pump car, rail push trolley, push-trolley, jigger, Kalamazoo, velocipede, gandy dancer cart, platelayers' cart, draisine, or railbike) is a railroad car powered by its passengers or by people pushing the car from behind. It is mostly used as a railway maintenance of way or mining car, but it was also used for passenger service in some cases.

== Design and function ==
A typical design consists of an arm, called the walking beam, that pivots seesaw-like on a base, which the passengers alternately push down and pull up to move the car.

An even simpler design is pushed by two or four people (called trolleymen), with hand brakes to stop the trolley. When the trolley slows down, two trolleymen jump off the trolley and push it till it picks up speed. Then they jump into the trolley again, and the cycle continues. The trolleymen take turns in pushing the trolley to maintain the speed and avoid fatigue. Four people were also required to safely lift the trolley off the rail tracks when a train approaches.

Rail tracks have a tendency to develop various defects, including cracks, loose packing etc., which may lead to accidents. The first rail inspections were done visually. Push trolley inspections formed a very important part of these visual inspections.

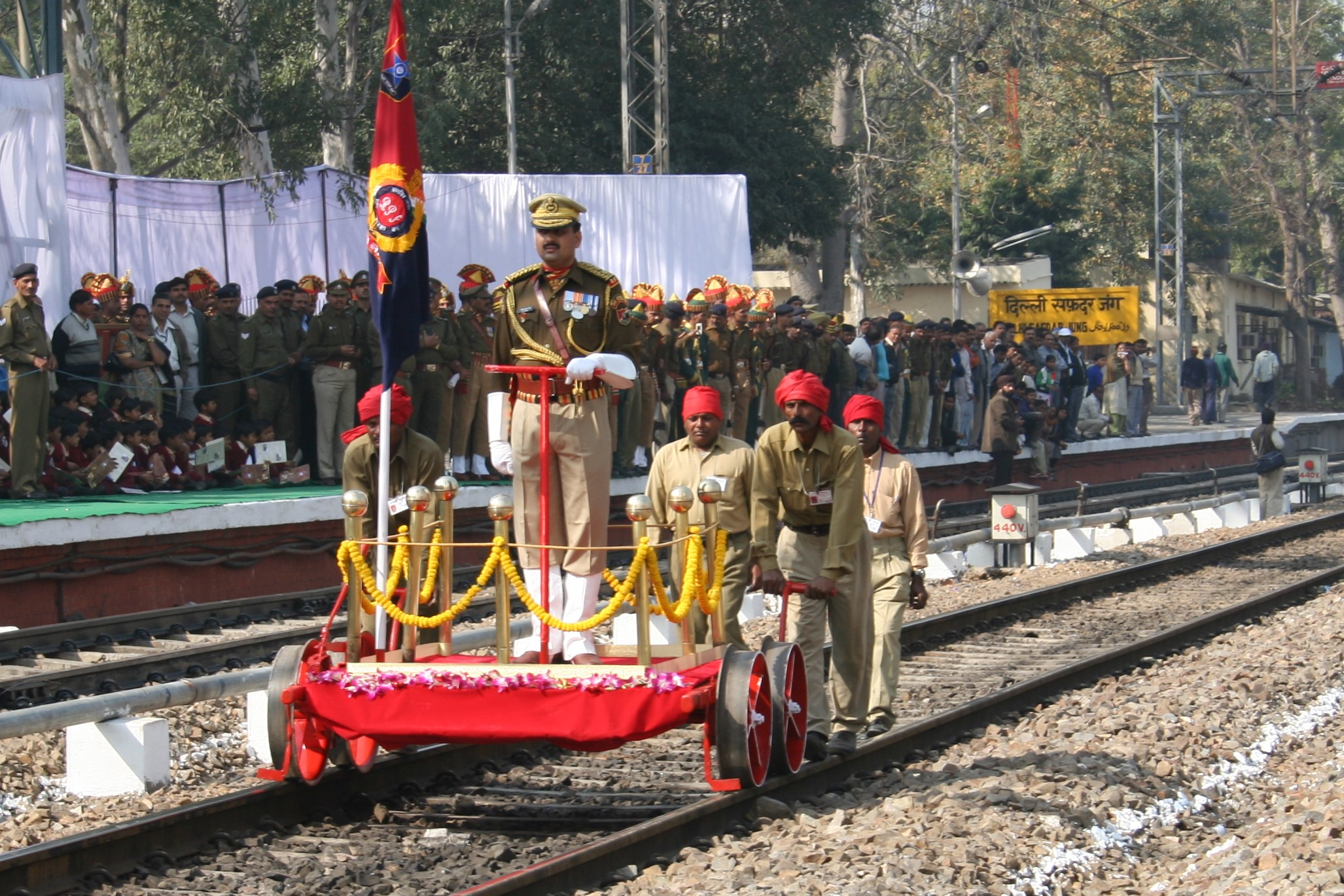
Indian Railway Inspection Trolley in 2007

== Modern usage ==
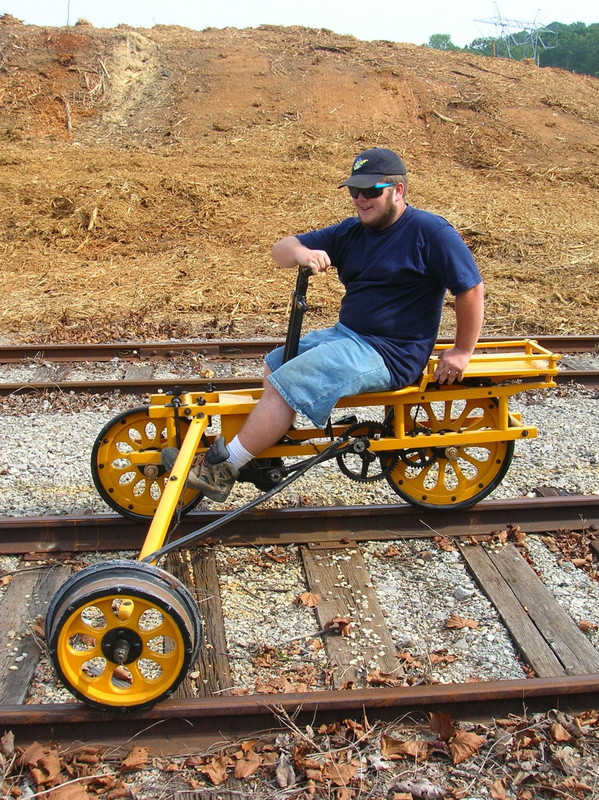
Handcar designed to be operated by a single person, widely known in North America as a velocipede.

Handcars were normally used by railway service personnel (the latter also known as gandy dancer carts) for railroad inspection and maintenance. Because of their low weight and small size, they can be put on and taken off the rails at any place, allowing trains to pass. Handcars have since been replaced by self-propelled vehicles that do not require the use of manual power, instead relying on internal combustion engines or electricity to move the vehicle.

Push trolleys have a major advantage over motorized trolleys as they do not require any traffic block and the inspecting officials can carry out inspections at their leisure.. On the other hand, push trolleys are a potential safety hazard as they occupy track (albeit temporarily) and, if the trolley is not removed from track in time, it can collide with a train and cause an accident. Therefore, on sections having gradients or poor visibility, the push trolleys are not allowed without traffic blocks. '

=== Racing ===
Handcars are nowadays used by handcar enthusiasts at vintage railroad events and for races between handcars driven by five person teams (one to push the car from a halt, four to pump the lever). One such race, the Handcar Regatta, was held in Santa Rosa, California from 2008 to 2011, and other races are held in Australia. See the section on racing below. Aside from handcars built for racing, new handcars are being built with modern roller bearings and milled axles and crankshafts.

The Canadian Championship Handcar Races are held annually at the Palmerston Railway Heritage Museum (formerly the old Palmerston CNR station) in Palmerston, Ontario, Canada each June. These races began in 1992 and have been running since.

An annual handcar race, Dr. E. P. Kitty's Wunderkammer, featuring the Great Sonoma County Handcar Races (formerly known as The Hand-car Regatta), is held in the rail-yard in old downtown Santa Rosa, California. A multi-faceted festival, it centers around races of numerous widely varying human-powered vehicles operating on railroad tracks, including traditional hand-powered carts and others powered by pedals or pushing.

A similar race occurred in the nearby Northern California town of Willits, California, on Sept. 8 and 9, 2012. Other races are held in Australia, some using preserved old handcars.

=== Tourist usage ===
For some decades, especially in Europe, the handcar has also been used for tourist and recreational purposes. In this case, handcar is usually called a draisine or railbike. Thanks to draisines it is possible to make use of sections of abandoned railway lines, allowing visitors to discover beautiful natural landscapes that would be otherwise inaccessible. The use of handcars is growing thanks to increasing attention, throughout the Western world, to sustainable tourism.

The European country in which the draisine is most prevalent is probably France (under the name vélorail), where in 2021 there were 56 active routes. Many of these have been united, since 2004, in the Federation of Vélorail of France.

The usage of draisines in Europe has also spread to many Northern countries, such as Sweden and Finland, but also Belgium, Luxembourg, in Germany. Even in Italy the practice is starting to spread, with a few projects under consideration.

== By country ==
=== Great Britain ===
There is an early account of a 'handcar' traversing the Hay Railway and the connected Kington Tramway in 1841. This was a horse drawn tramway totalling 36 mi (58 km) purely for freight use, and the man-powered truck that appeared in 1841 was sufficienly unusual to have been reported in the newspaper.

"On Monday last a new machine made its appearance on our tram-road. In the course of the day two-men came from Kington in an ingenious vehicle, which they contrived to propel by means of cog-wheels, set in motion by a winch, the handles of which were turned by the men, who were seated in the machine itself, which proceeded at the rate of 5 or 6 miles per hour. From Hay they proceeded to Brecon, and returned about 5 o'clock on Tuesday with a ton of coal..."

The creators of this handcar are not named.

=== United States ===
It is not clear who invented the handcar, also written as hand car or hand-car. One of the first was the track velocipede invented by George S. Sheffield of Three Rivers in 1877. It is likely that machinists in individual railroad shops began to build them to their own design. Many of the earliest ones operated by turning large cranks. It is likely that the pump handcar, with a reciprocating walking beam, came later. While there are hundreds of US patents pertaining to details of handcars, probably the primary designs of mechanisms for powering handcars were in such common use that they were not patent-able when companies started to manufacture handcars for sale to the railroads.

Handcars were absolutely essential to the operation of railroads during a time when railroads were the primary form of public transportation for people and goods in America, from about 1850 to 1910. There may have been handcars as early as the late 1840s but they were quite common during the American Civil War. They were a very important tool in the construction of the Transcontinental Railroad. There were many thousands of them built. They were commonly assigned to a "section" of track, the section being between about 6 to 10 mi (9.7 to 16.1 km) long, depending upon the traffic weight and locomotive speed experienced on the section. Each section would have a section crew that would maintain that piece of track. Each section usually had a section house which was used to store tools and the section's handcar. Roughly 130,000 mi (210,000 km) of track had been constructed in America by 1900. Thus, considering there was a handcar assigned to at least every ten miles of that track, there would have been a minimum of 13,000 handcars operating in the United States. This number is obviously a gross underestimate because many sections were shorter than 10 miles and railroads also had spare handcars for use in unusual circumstances. Telegraph company Western Union and other rail-users had their own handcars, adding to the overall handcar population.

The first handcars, built in the railroad shops, were probably made of whatever parts the shops had around or could easily make. These cars were probably quite heavy. Heavy handcars need more people to propel them. More people will add more power but at some point the benefits are offset by the weight of the people: their own weight would not be compensated by any extra power they can produce. Many companies made handcars in the years following the American Civil War as evidenced by the number of advertisements in contemporary publications such as The Car Builder's Dictionary. By the mid 1880s The Sheffield Velocipede Car Company, The Kalamazoo Velocipede Company and the Buda Foundry and Manufacturing Company were the three large companies who were the primary builders of handcars. Sheffield was almost immediately acquired by industrial giant Fairbanks Morse. All three companies changed their names over the years; but for most of the years that they produced handcars, they were still identified as Sheffield, Kalamazoo and Buda. Hand cars continued to be available through the first half of the 20th century. Fairbanks Morse was still offering a handcar from their catalog as late as 1950 and Kalamazoo sold them until at least 1955.

While depictions on TV and in movies might suggest that being a member of a handcar crew is a joyride, in fact pumping a traditional handcar with bronze bearings rather than modern roller bearings can be very hard work. The disagreeable nature of this experience must have been heightened by the dead weight of typical section crew supplies such as railroad spikes, track nuts and bolts, shovels, pry bars of various sorts and other iron and steel equipment.

Motor section cars began to appear in the very early 1900s, or a few years earlier. They quickly replaced most of the handcars. Those handcars whose uses continued even during World War I, were probably scrapped during World War II. The number of handcars that survived is unclear. They can be found in railroad museums and some are in private hands.

=== Australia ===
In Australia, hand cars or pump carts are commonly referred to as Kalamazoos after the Kalamazoo Manufacturing Company, which provided many examples to the Australian railway market. Many Kalamazoos are preserved in Australia, some even being used for races.

=== Guatemala ===
There is a push car service along the railroad tracks between Anguiatú in Guatemala and rural towns across the Salvadoran border. Sometimes it is pulled by a horse.

=== India ===
Although many railways in the world have switched to other methods of inspection, it is still widely used over Indian Railways in addition to other techniques, especially for inspecting railway track and assets like bridges which are situated between stations. The push trolley carries one or more officials inspecting the track and the railside equipment. The official carries instruments to measure and check the condition of the tracks and monitor the work being done by the trackmen, keymen, gatemen etc. who maintain, patrol, man the track and installations. The push trolley is also used by officials inspecting signalling installations in some parts of India. On routes carrying high volumes of traffic, such as the suburban section in Mumbai, push trolleys cannot be used and foot inspections are being resorted to.

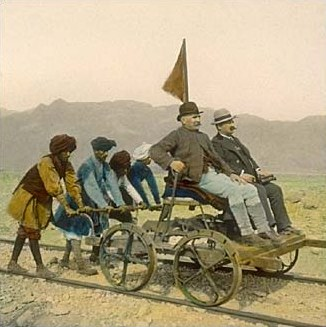
A magic lantern image from circa 1895 shows four people from British India pushing a hand-car in Bolan Pass (now in Pakistan).

=== Japan ===
In Japan, dozens of commercially operated handcar railway lines, called human car tramway (人車軌道, jinsha kidō) or human car railway (人車鉄道, jinsha tetsudō) existed in early 20th century. Those lines were purely built for its passenger/freight service, and "drivers" pushed small train cars all the way. The first line, Fujieda-Yaizu Tramway, opened in 1891, and most of the others opened before 1910. Most lines were less than 10 km (6.2 mi) long, and the rail gauges used were either 2 ft 6 in (762 mm) or 2 ft (610 mm). As the human-powered system was fairly inefficient, many handcar tramways soon changed their power resources to either horse or gasoline. Taishaku Handcar Tramway ceased its operation as early as 1912, and almost all the lines were already closed before 1945.

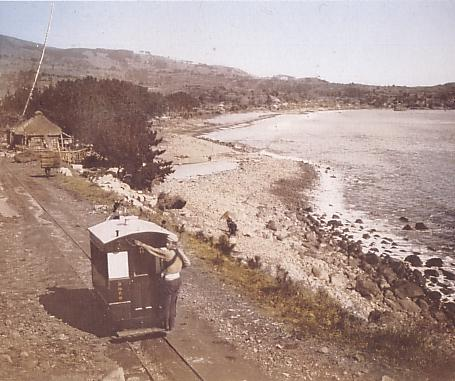
Zusō Handcar Tramway in Yugawara, Japan, 1895–1924.

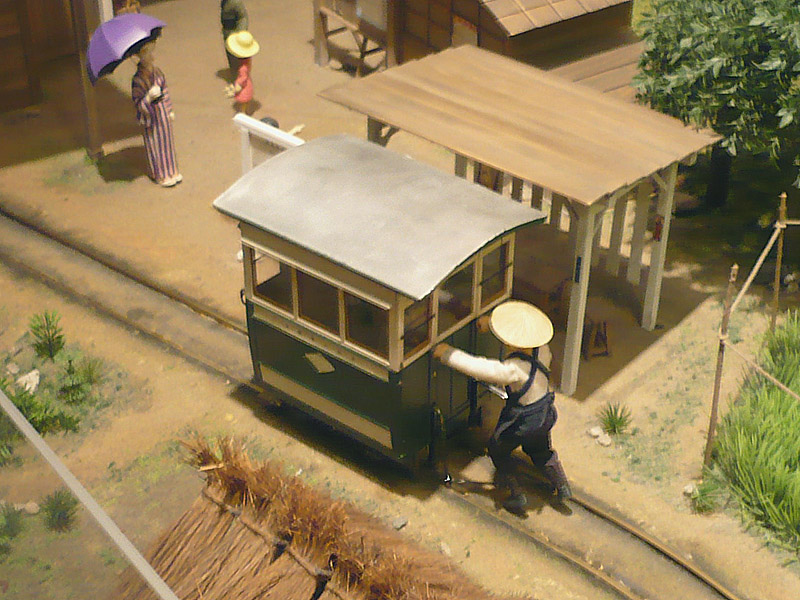
Model of Taishaku Handcar Tramway, showing method of operation.

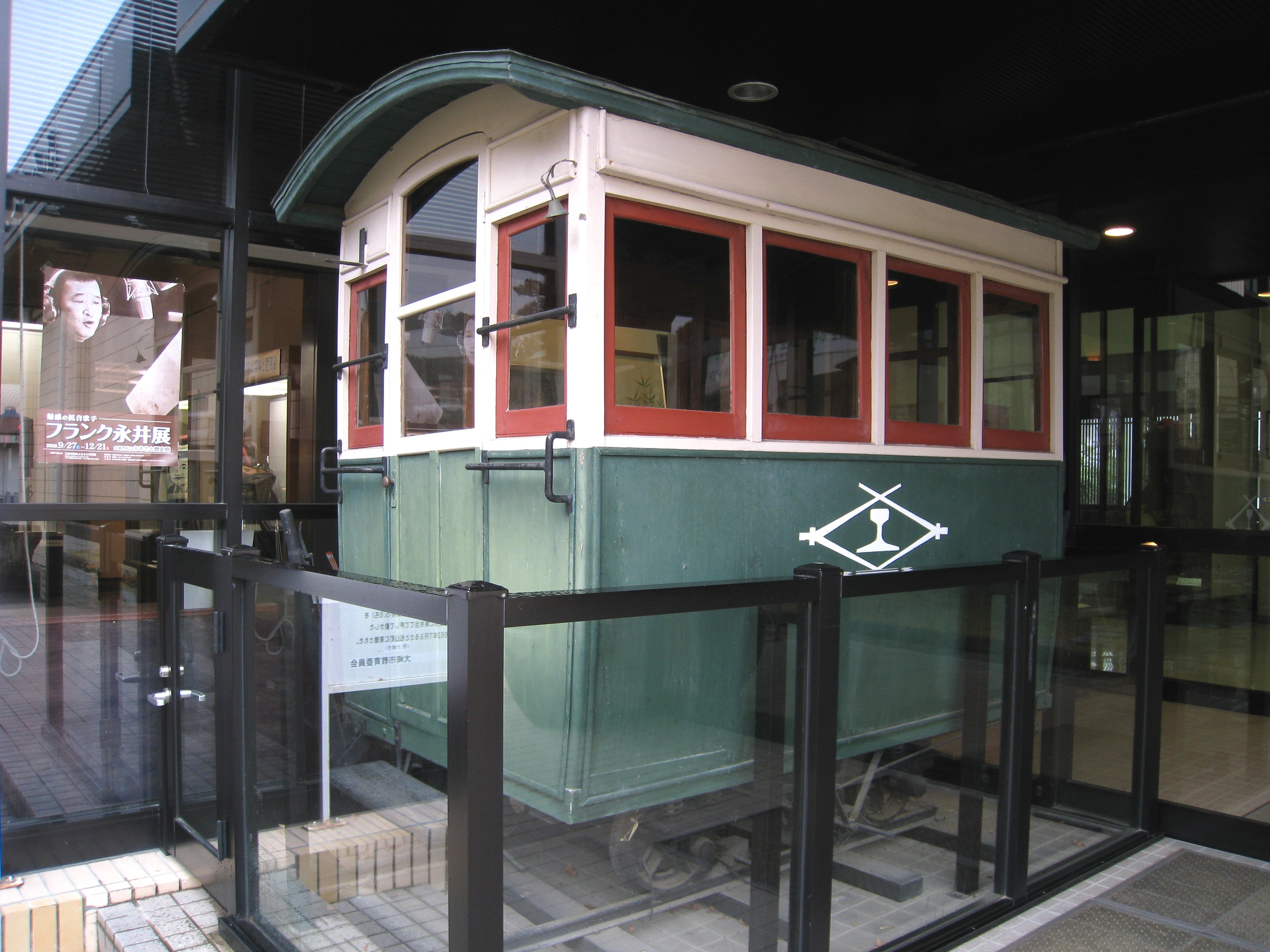
Handcar of Matsuyama Handcar Tramway at Osaki City Matsuyama Furusato History Museum

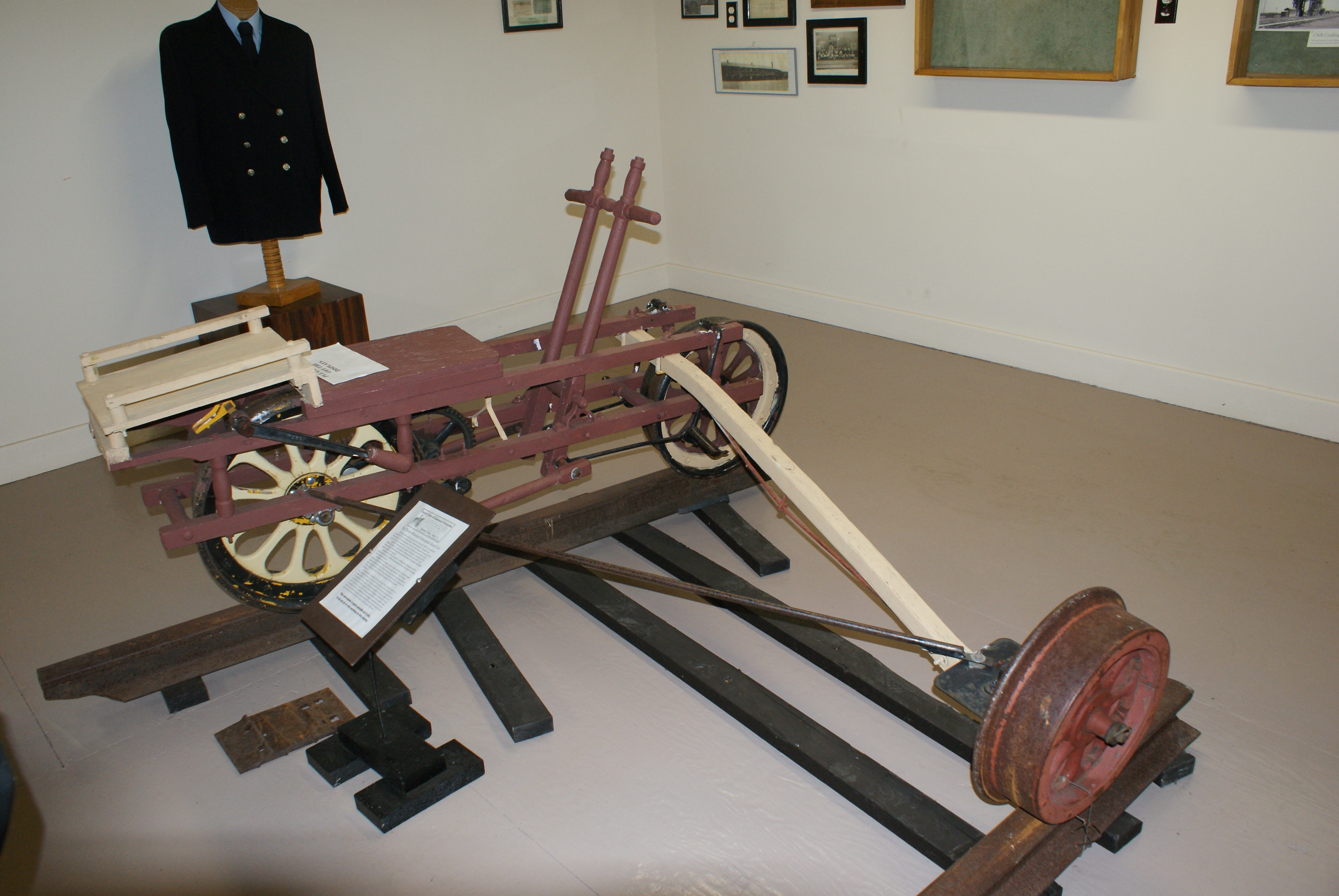
Three wheel hand car at the Saskatchewan Railway Museum

List of handcar tramways in Japan
- Hokkaidō
  - Ebetsu Town Handcar Tramway 江別町営人車軌道
- Akita
  - Nakanishi Tokugorō Operated Tramway 中西徳五郎経営軌道
- Yamagata
  - Akayu Handcar Tramway 赤湯人車軌道
- Iwate
  - Waga Light Tramway 和賀軽便軌道
- Miyagi
  - Matsuyama Handcar Tramway 松山人車軌道
- Tochigi
  - Iwafune Handcar Tramway 岩舟人車鉄道
  - Kitsuregawa Handcar Tramway 喜連川人車鉄道
  - Nabeyama Handcar Tramway 鍋山人車軌道
  - Nasu Handcar Tramway 那須人車軌道
  - Otome Handcar Tramway 乙女人車軌道
  - Utsunomiya Stone Tramway 宇都宮石材軌道
- Ibaraki
  - Haguro Tramway 羽黒軌道
  - Inada Tramway 稲田軌道
  - Iwama Tramway 岩間軌道
  - Kabaho Kōgyō Tramway 樺穂興業軌道
  - Kasama Handcar Tramway 笠間人車軌道
- Chiba
  - Mobara-Chōnan Handcar Tramway 茂原・長南間人車軌道
  - Noda Handcar Tramway 野田人車鉄道 (linemap)
  - Ōhara-Ōtaki Handcar Tramway 大原・大多喜間人車軌道
  - Tōkatsu Handcar Tramway 東葛人車鉄道
- Tokyo
  - Taishaku Handcar Tramway 帝釈人車軌道
    - The current Keisei Kanamachi Line.
- Gunma
  - Satomi Tramway 里見軌道
  - Yabuzuka Stone Tramway 藪塚石材軌道
    - The part of the current Tōbu Kiryū Line.
- Kanagawa
  - Zusō Handcar Tramway 豆相人車鉄道
    - Also in Shizuoka.
- Shizuoka
  - Fujieda-Yaizu Tramway 藤枝焼津間軌道
  - Nakaizumi Tramway 中泉軌道
  - Shimada Tramway 島田軌道
- Fukui
  - Hongō Tramway 本郷軌道
- Okinawa
  - Okinawa Handcar Tramway 沖縄人車軌道

=== Philippines ===
Hand built Trolleys are illegally used on suburban railway tracks as an unauthorised commuter service in Manila, Philippines.

=== Taiwan ===
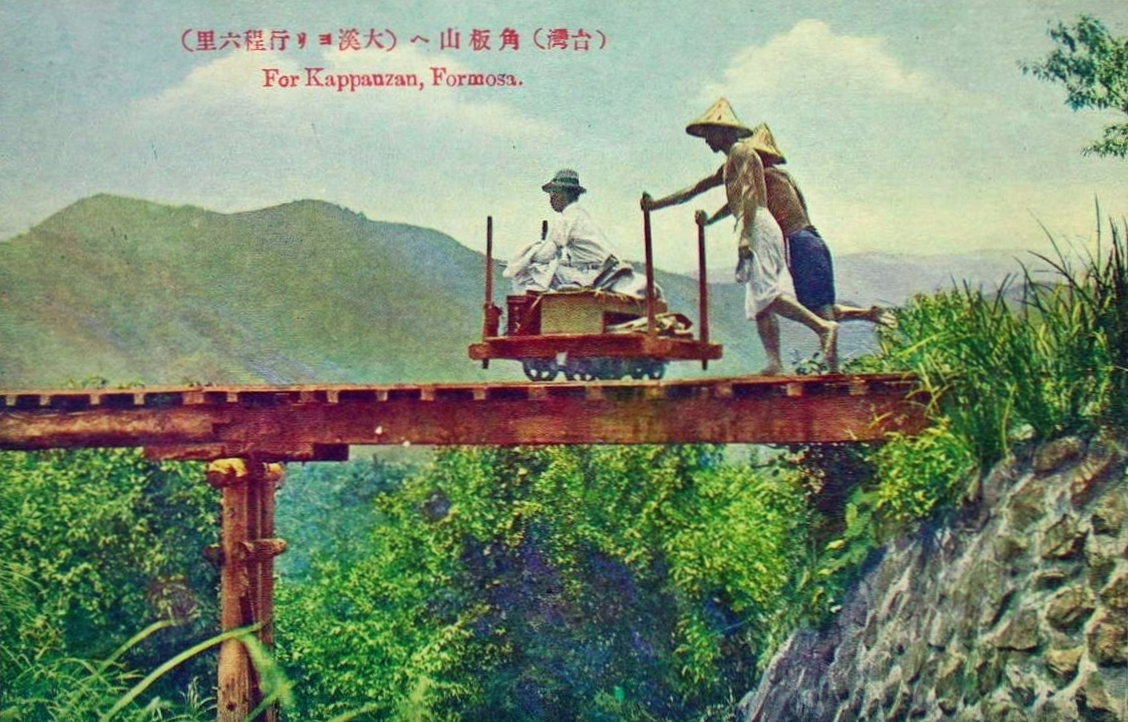
Taiwanese push car railway in the early 20th century

In Taiwan, commercially operated handcars were called either light railway line (Traditional Chinese: 輕便線; Hanyu Pinyin: qīngbiàn-xiàn), hand-pushed light railway line (手押輕便線; shǒuyā qīngbiàn-xiàn), hand-pushed tramway (手押軌道; shǒuyā guǐdào), or most commonly, hand-pushed wagon (手押臺車; shǒuyā táichē). The first line was built in the 1870s. The network developed later under Japanese rule. In 1933, its peak, there were more than 50 lines in the island with 1,292 km network, transporting local passengers, coal, factory products, sugar, salt, bananas, tea leaves, and others. Most lines, excluding those in mines and isolated islands, have disappeared following the end of Japanese rule. However, a few lines survived well into the 1970s. Currently, only the sightseeing line in Wūlái still exists, although its line is not human-powered anymore.

== In popular culture ==
Handcars are a recurring railway-themed plot device of twentieth and twenty-first century film, such as comedy, drama and animation.

- The opening scene of Blazing Saddles, set at a railroad construction site, features a handcar.
- In the movie Mad Max Beyond Thunderdome, the culminating chase scene takes place along a railway, with one of the pursuers chasing the heroes down the tracks on a handcar.
- In the Dad's Army episode "The Royal Train", the Walmington-on-Sea Home Guard platoon find themselves stuck on a runaway train. Warden Hodges, the vicar, the verger and the town mayor chase them using a handcar.
- In the movie O Brother, Where Art Thou?, the three main characters encounter an old blind man on a handcar after escaping from prison and in the conclusion of the movie.
- In the movie The Great St Trinian's Train Robbery two St Trinian's schoolgirls use one to move between distant points levers.
- In the Wile E. Coyote and Road Runner cartoon "Rushing Roulette" (1965) Wile E. Coyote attempts to catch the Road Runner using a handcar.
- In 1998, Sega manufactured the handcar-themed arcade game Magical Truck Adventure which the player controls by pumping a large handle.

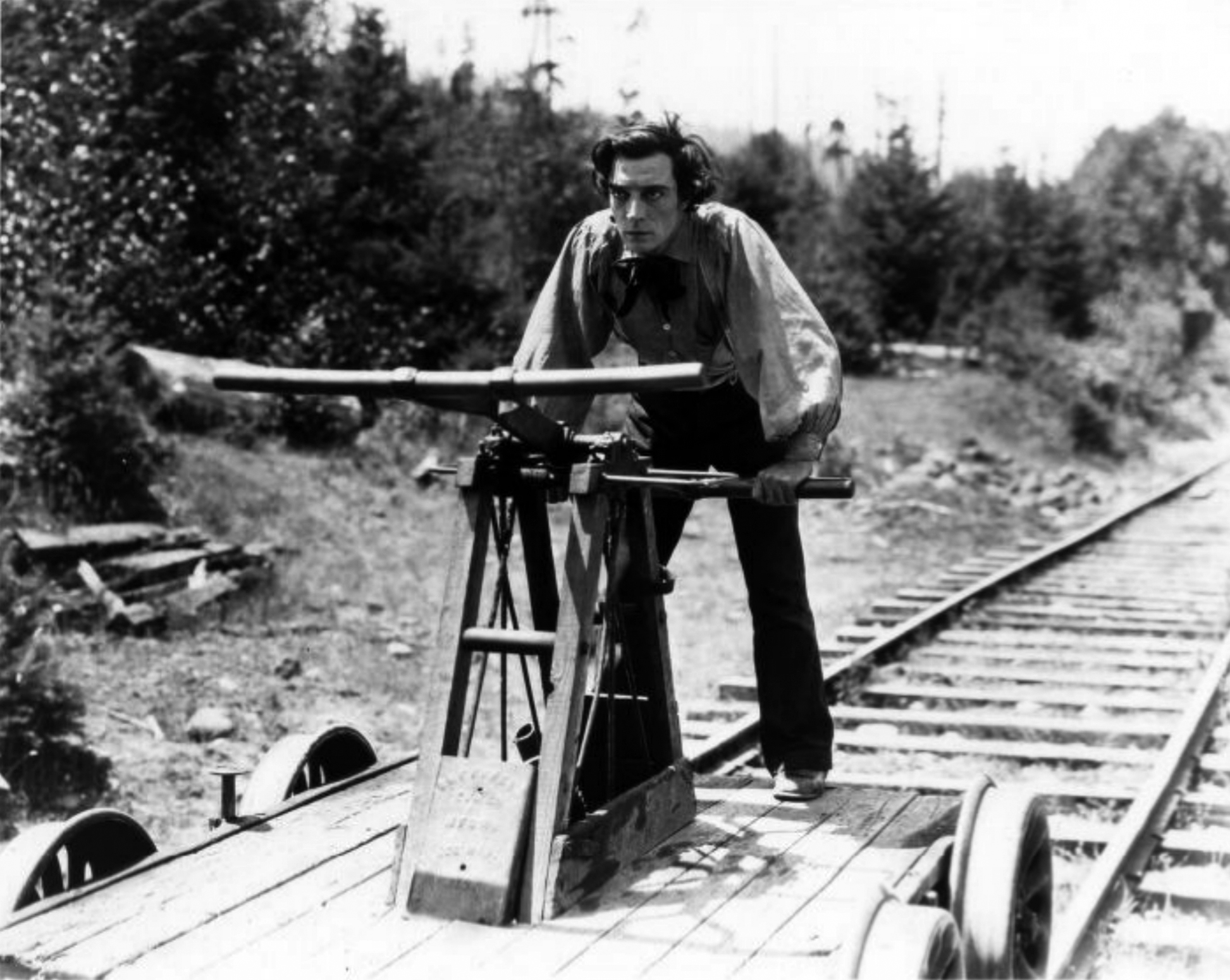
Buster Keaton driving a hand car in the 1926 film The General

- Buster Keaton uses a handcar during a chase scene in the film The General; he also uses a powered draisine in The Railrodder.
- In Reds (1981), John Reed, played by Warren Beatty, attempts to leave Russia via a velocipede but is detained by Finnish troops at the border.
- In Thomas and Friends, Old Bailey uses a handcar in the episode "Haunted Henry" (series 5, episode 11). This handcar can also be seen in series 6, 14, 15, 16, 22 and 23. A real-life handcar can also be seen in the 10 Years of Thomas and Friends VHS on the Strasburg Railroad during a "Day Out with Thomas" event.
- In Postman Pat, Pat, Jess and Ted use a handcar in the Special Delivery Service episode "A Wobbly Piano".
- In a Dr. Seuss movie, Green Eggs and Ham, the Grumpy Guy escapes on the handcar in the rain.
- In the Help! It's the Hair Bear Bunch episode Raffle Ruckus, the animals and keepers of the Wonderland Zoo use handcars when leaving the train they were on.
- In the TV show Petticoat Junction, a handcar is shown in many episodes, whenever the Cannonball is not available to take the Hooterville Valley residents where they need to be.
- In the Mr. Men Show episode "Trains and Planes", Mr. Bump and Miss Helpful use a handcar to deliver sleepers for the railway. Later at the end, Mr. Grumpy jumps on board their handcar, but it gets destroyed by Miss Whoops.
- In The Good Place episode "Tinker, Tailor, Demon, Spy", the characters Michael and Jason begin a journey from The Good Place to The Bad Place on a handcar. In the following episode "Employee of the Bearimy" they complete the journey and later return to The Good Place on the handcar with Janet.
- Handcars are featured in the western adventure game Red Dead Redemption 2. In one mission, protagonists Arthur Morgan and John Marston use a handcar to carry some dynamite onto a railway bridge they need to blow up.

== Gallery ==
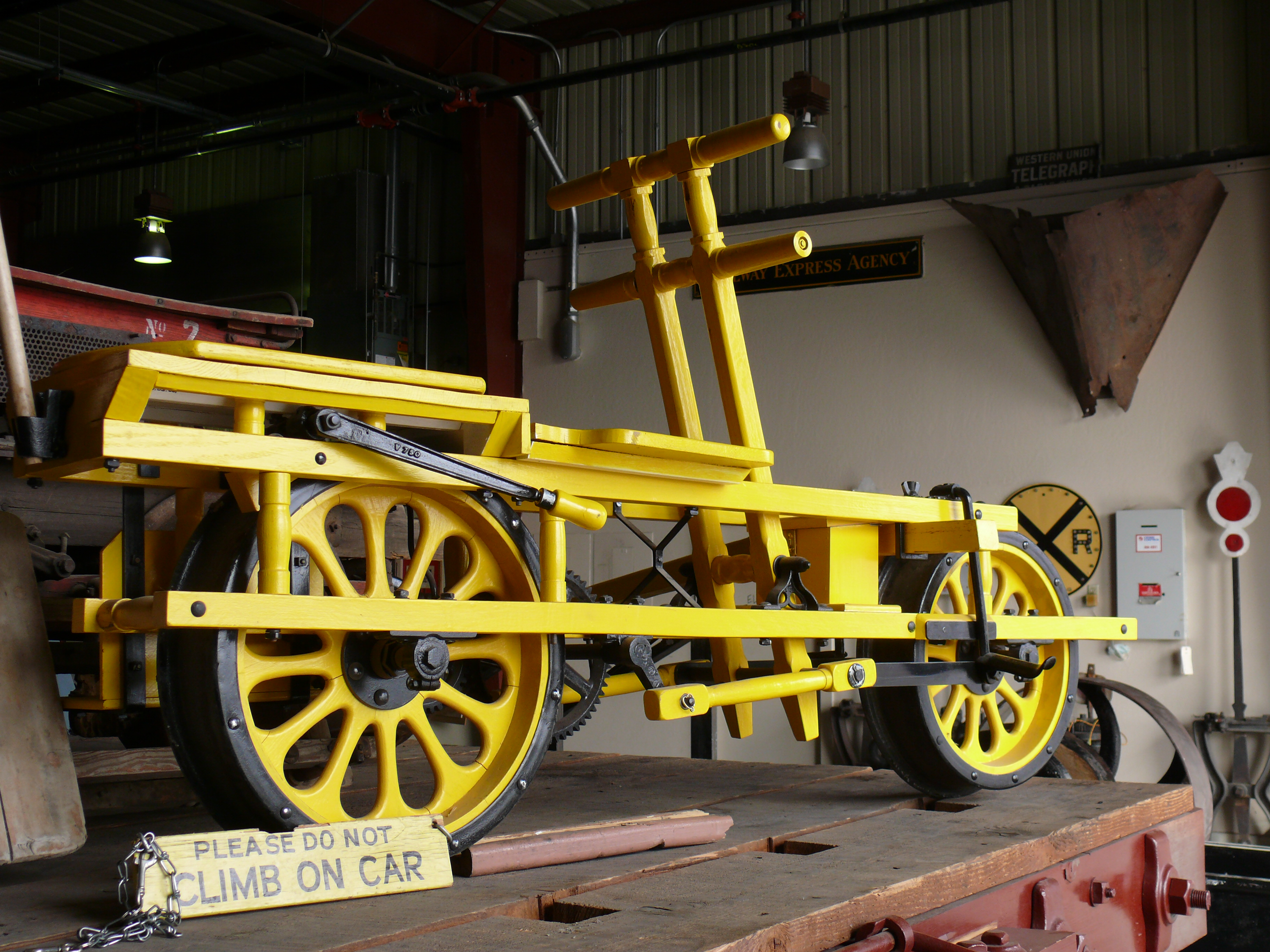
Handcar or velocipede at the Nevada State Railroad Museum

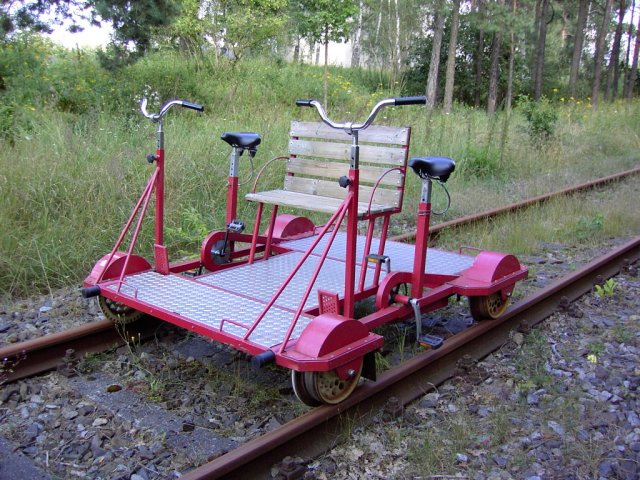
Rail-cycle with 4 wheels. A single bicycle may also be modified with an outrigger and locating wheels to operate upon rails

A handcar, in original condition (at the Shelburne Falls Trolley Museum). The foot brake operating mechanism may be seen between the wheels.

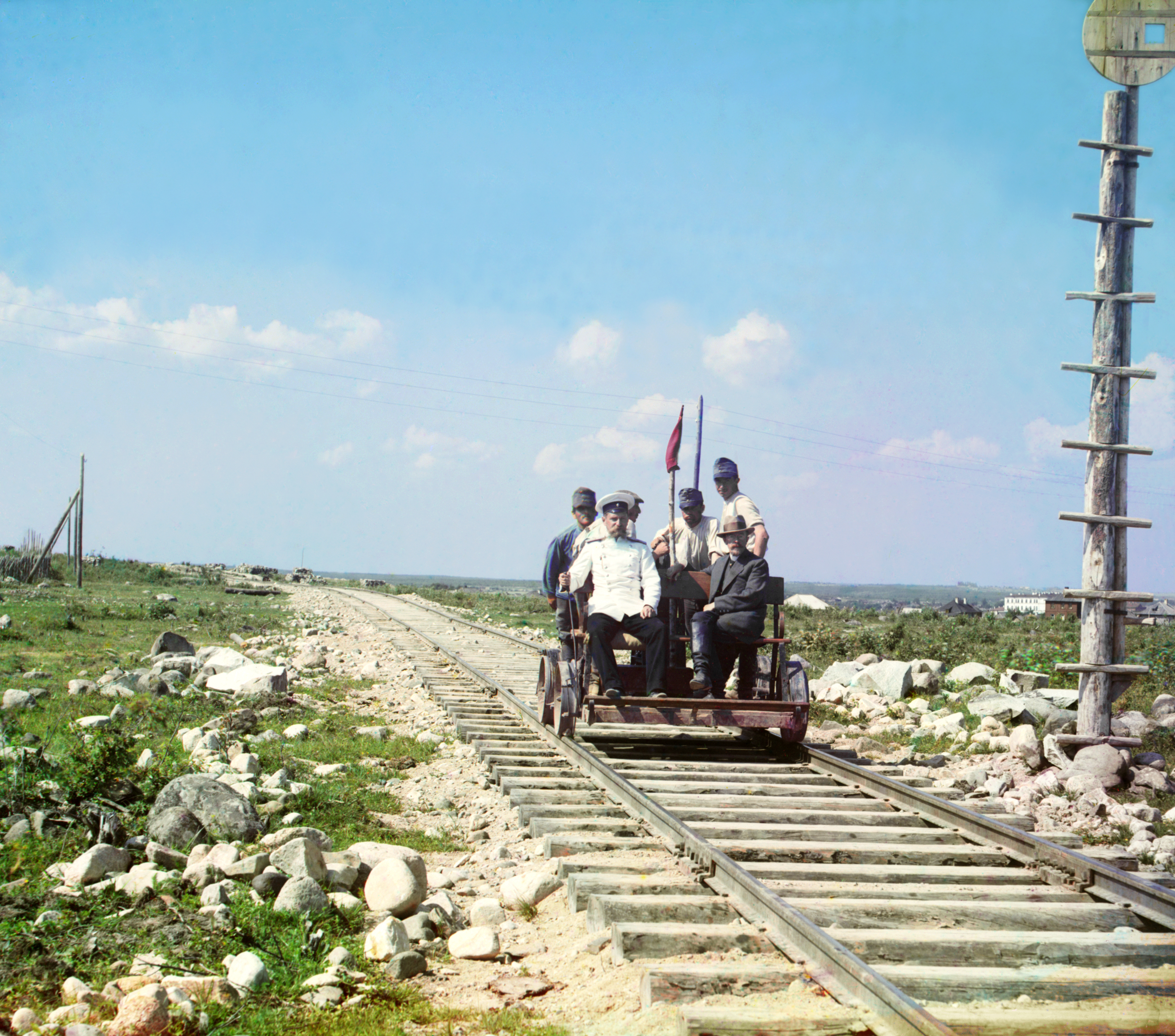
Handcar riding along the Murmansk railroad, on the shore of Lake Onega. (circa 1916)

Animation of a handcar, based on a patent by George S. Sheffield

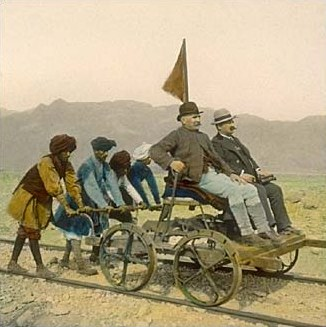
A rail push trolley in undivided India (1895 or earlier)

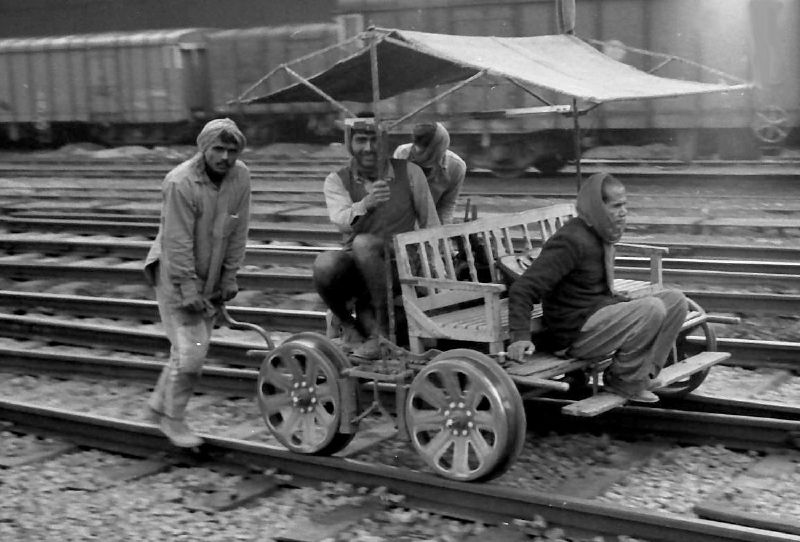
A rail push trolley in India (1978)

== See also ==
- Draisine
- History of the bicycle
- Human-powered transport
- Maintenance of way
- Nondestructive testing
- Railcar
- Rail inspection
- Some rowing cycles are inspired by early handcars
- Rail tracks
- Track checker
- Velocipede handcar
