= Gibson Manufacturing Corporation =

1933–1952 manufacturing company

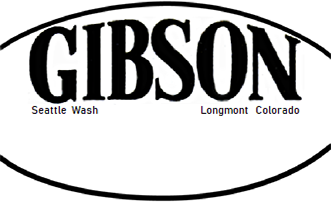
- Logo used on large tractors and dealer signs.
- Trade name: Gibson Tractor
- Founded: Seattle, Wash. United States (1933)
- Defunct: 1952
- Fate: Closed 1952.
- Headquarters: Seattle, Longmont, United States
- Area served: United States and 26 other countries.
- Products: Rail cars, tractors, forklifts

Gibson Manufacturing Corporation was a company that made tractors and railroad speeders. It is estimated they made around 60,000 tractors.

== Rail cars ==
In 1933 Gibson recognized that there was a need for larger railroad speeders than those available on the market at the time. Gibson's larger speeder was an immediate success, and several found their way to logging railroads, where people needed to be moved from logging site to logging site separate of the log trains. Some of these speeders now remain in museums.

== Tractors ==
Their first tractor was the model A; production started in Seattle, Washington, sometime after 1938, but moved to Longmont, Colorado, in 1946, after the corporation was pressured to unionize, and later models were made here as well. Headquarters and product development stayed in Seattle There are 10 models. A, D, E, H, I, SD, Super D, Super D2, and experimental models SL and M, few of which are known to exist. A, D, SD, and Super D tractors all used 6 HP Wisconsin AEH engines. The Super D2 used a 12 HPWisconsin TFD engine. Seattle tractors were usually painted blue-gray with red sheetmetal. while Colorado ones were either Fordson Gray or Red or a mix of these colors. An advertisement read "Master of 1000 Chores. The Gibson tractor is outstanding in development design. The tractor is ideally adapted for use on the small general farm, truck farm, orchards or as a auxiliary tractor for large farms, ranches, country estates and municipalities, along with park systems."

Several accessories were sold to go on these tractors, including two types of plow with Sandoval coulter disks, a disk harrow, dozers, and for the Model D a sickle mower.

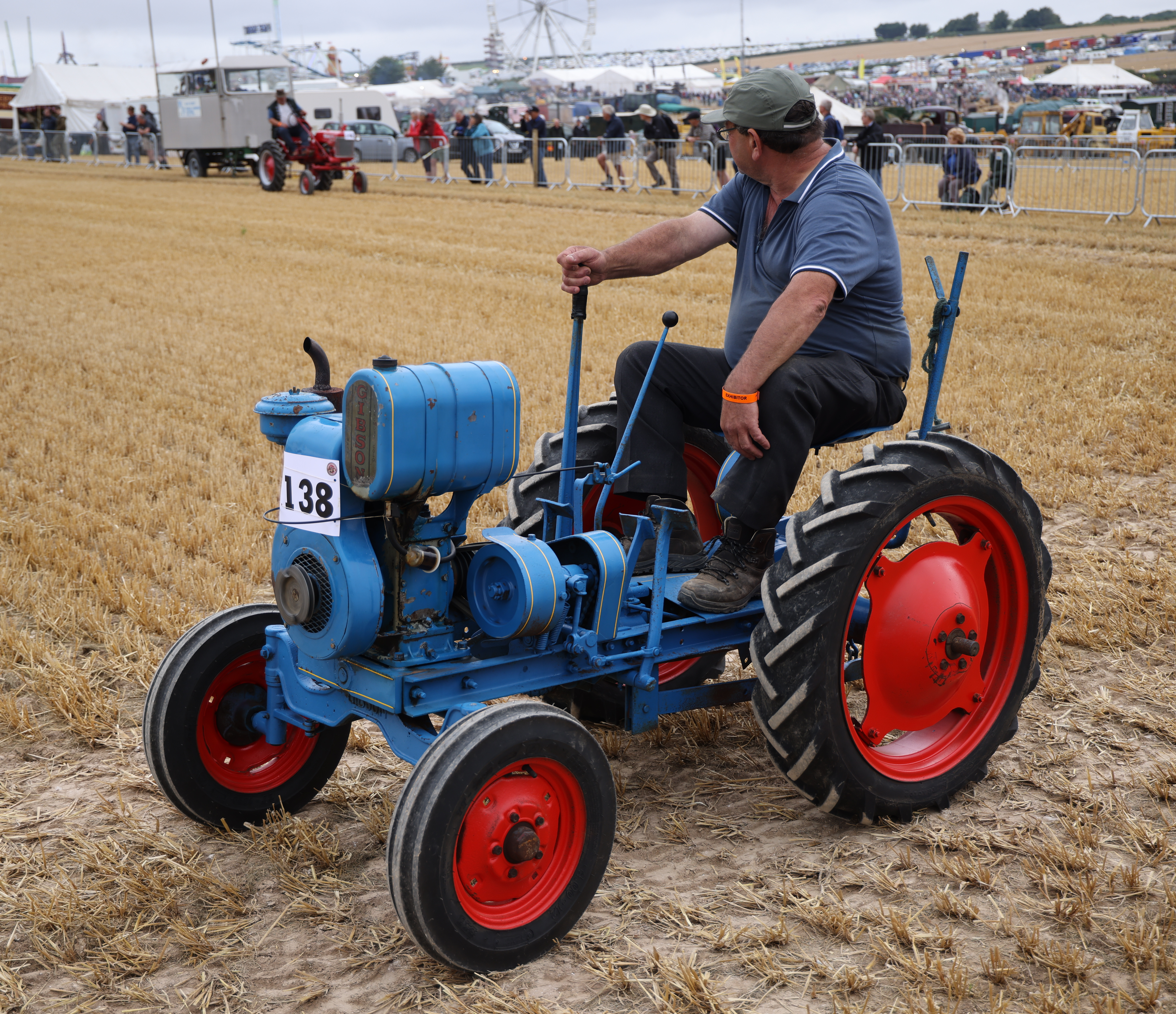
A Gibson Model D tractor

After the company closed the designs for the Super D and the Super D2 were sold to PowerFlex.

== Forklifts ==
The U.S. military signed a contract with Gibson Manufacturing Corporation to make forklifts, but this contract may have led to their closing when they were unable to fulfill it.
