= Australian Society of Section Car Operators =

Body representing railway operators in Australia

ASSCO's logo

The Australian Society of Section Car Operators (ASSCO), is an accredited railway operator that seeks access to railways for its members. It was originally registered as a non-profit organisation, under the Associations Incorporation Act in South Australia.

== Group history ==
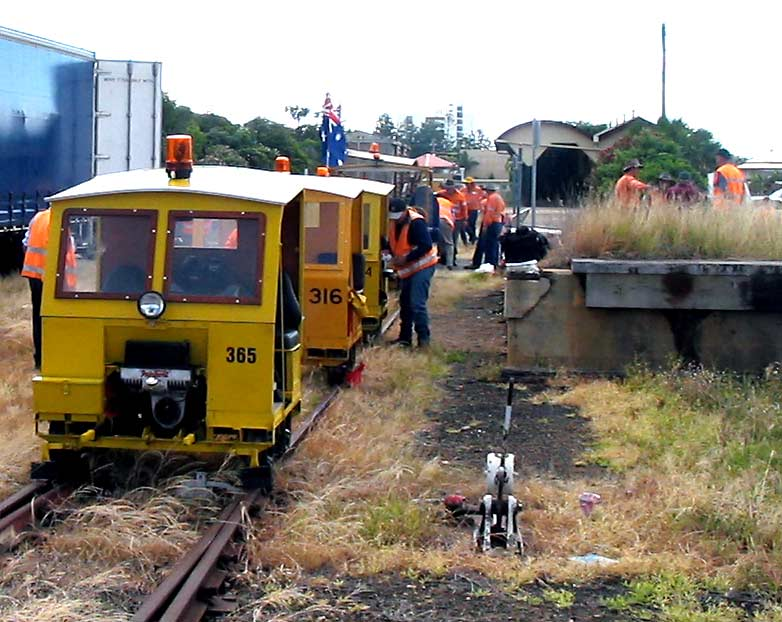
ASSCO members at Yeppoon

ASSCO was founded in November 1999, following a series of informal meetings, by a group of motor section car owners who were operating in South Australia.

At the time, many cars were being run using the insurance and systems of a number of heritage railways, including Steamtown, and often under the "work for ride" banner. Changes to the regulatory regime in South Australia allowed for the accreditation of a body as a railway owner and operator, subject to meeting the requirements of Australian Standard AS4292 Railway safety management.

ASSCO was established to hold the accreditation, and in 2000, work commenced on the preparation of a safety management case for the group. The case considered obligations under the Rail Safety Act, Occupational Health Safety and Welfare Act, AS 4801/4804, AS4360, AS4292 and ISO 9000 quality systems. Interim accreditation was achieved in June 2000 Work to prepare the safety case was done by one of the founding members, with operational experience coming from a former railwayman, whilst a number of the processes used by the North American Railcar Operators Association were considered and, were necessary, modified to meet Australian Regulatory requirements.

By April 2001, the organisation had in place an access agreement, which meant accreditation could be granted. ASSCO was the first not-for-profit ("Heritage") railway to be granted accreditation as a railway operator without owning or managing its own railway line in South Australia. It was also the first heritage operator to start up under the regulatory regime since it was implemented. The committee at the time, and subsequently, has avoided taking (long term) responsibility for any infrastructure, because of the work and cost associated with its maintenance. That said, the group has held a lease over the railway between Kevin and Penong on the Far West of Eyre Peninsula.

Originally, operations focused on the railways of South Australia. However, realised early on that other states would be essential to assist the group to grow, work for access in other states did not commence for several years. It last operated in South Australia in 2004.

== First Run ==
After gaining accreditation, the group made a number of approaches to heritage and commercial railway operators for access.

The first railway to agree to host an ASSCO meet was NRG Flinders Operating Services Pty Ltd, operator of the Leigh Creek line, between Port Augusta and Copley. This was the longest run for section cars at the time, some 250 km (160 mi). The event was run over the Easter Long Weekend, 2001. This line carried one coal train each way each day, meaning the trip crossed trains both days.

== Other Runs ==
ASSCO has also operated on railways owned by One Rail Australia, Pichi Richi Railway, the Australian Electric Transport Museum, and the Lions Club of YPRail. Additionally, it has leased the Kevin Penong line for two weekends.

In Queensland, ASSCO operates over the 42-inch gauge trackage of Queensland Railways. It has conducted operations as far north as Cairns, including the Normanton-Croydon Railway. Others include Cairns to Forsayth, Townsville to Cairns, Emerald to Winton, Miles to Charleville, Warwick to Thallon, and Toowoomba to Wallangarra.

The inaugural run on the QR network was over the now-closed line between Theebine and Kingaroy in April 2003

The group has accessed a limited number of heritage railways, including the Mary Valley Rattler, which hosted ASSCO for a commissioning and training day on 23 March 2003.

The largest group of participants ever attended its Monto Loop Run (19 cars and 32 people) on a trip between Biggenden and Calliope in Queensland in April 2010.

== Sharing the benefit ==
The group recognised the benefit of synergistic collaboration upon its inception. Specifically, there must be an advantage for the organisation hosting a run, or for a commercial railway owner, the access should be cost-neutral, if not marginally profitable.

Indeed, ASSCO members have provided numerous organisations with non-pecuniary benefits as a result of access.

As a charitable organisation, ASSCO donates a portion of member event fees to other non-profit entities, such as the Queensland Air Ambulance Service and the Don River Railway.

ASSCO does not transport members of the public. However, its members are tourists themselves and contribute significantly to the local economies where they operate.

== Current operations ==
ASSCO currently operates over the Queensland Rail network, having signed a five-year access agreement with QR in May 2024.

On average, ASSCO conducts four operations (events) annually.

The organization boasts a membership of over 50 individuals, with 30 actively participating. Membership is obtained through an annual subscription, and several railway industry competencies are required to participate in ASSCO operations. Ownership of a section car is not a prerequisite.

In recent years, a significant portion of the membership has been based in New South Wales, prompting ASSCO to seek access in the region. An access agreement has been successfully reached to operate in New South Wales, and ASSCO is applying for a variation to its accreditation with the Office of the National Rail Safety Regulator (ONRSR) to commence operations in the state.

== Safety Issues ==
Like all railway operators in Australia, ASSCO has been subject to regulatory intervention by the Office of the National Rail Safety Regulator (ONRSR), primarily concerning the enhancement of policies and procedures.

Having ceased operations in South Australia since 2004, ASSCO surrendered its accreditation in the region in 2010.

In mid-2019, ASSCO voluntarily suspended its operations to update its Rail Safety Management System (RSMS) to comply with current legislation and standards. Operations resumed in February 2020.

Following an audit by the ONRSR, an Improvement Notice was issued on 14 February 2023, which was subsequently cancelled on 8 March 2023. Around the same time, Queensland Rail suspended access for all section cars to its network due to concerns regarding level crossing safety. This suspension was lifted shortly thereafter, following consultations between ASSCO and QR management, and with the implementation of improved safety procedures concerning level crossings, ASSCO resumed operations in April 2023.

ASSCO continuously monitors and updates its safety policies and procedures in accordance with Rail Safety National Law (RSNL), thereby providing an environment where its members can safely enjoy Section Car travel.

== Affiliations ==
ASSCO was an International Affiliate of North American Railcar Operators Association (NARCOA).
