= Kalamazoo Manufacturing Company =

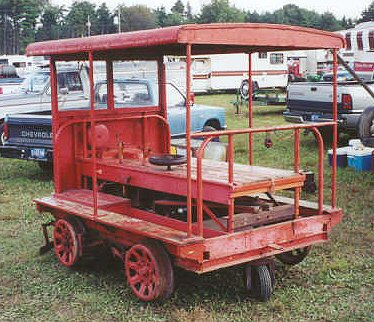
An early model of a Kalamazoo motorized railroad speeder (track inspection) car

The Kalamazoo Manufacturing Company located in Kalamazoo, Michigan, was a railroad-equipment manufacturer and, later, a materials-handling company, that was founded in 1883 and closed in the 1990s. It made four passenger vehicles for use at the 1964-65 New York World's Fair.

== Foundation and diversification ==
The Kalamazoo Railroad Velocipede and Car Company was founded in Kalamazoo in 1883 by George Miller and Horace Haines, with a capital stock of $45,000. The factory at Pitcher Street in downtown Kalamazoo was next to the Grand Rapids and Indiana Railroad (GR&I). By 1901, the company had changed its name to Kalamazoo Railway Supply Company. It manufactured hand and push cars, railroad speeders (motorised inspection cars), velocipedes, jacks, tanks, stand pipes and other products needed for railroad work. The company moved to a larger factory on Reed Street, also next to the Grand Rapids and Indiana Railroad, that still stands today.

In the early 1940s, the company diversified into the materials handling field with a "Speed Truck" line, early ancestors of today's personnel and material vehicles used as intra-plant transportation in many corporations. Many of the Speed Trucks used the same Wisconsin 16 brake horsepower (12 kilowatt) air-cooled engine in Kalamazoo railroad speeder (inspection) cars. Eventually, that product line grew to include a platform model, a dump model, and a runabout - a one-person, no-cargo version. A final name change in the early 1950s, to the Kalamazoo Manufacturing Company, reflected the growing non-railroad business.

== Product line ==
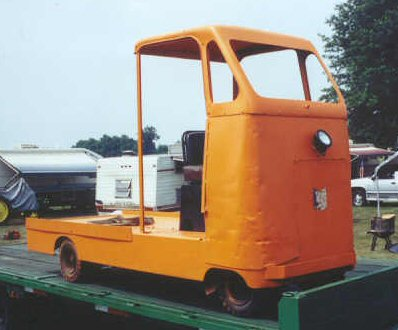
An early model of Kalamazoo Speed Truck

A 1960 catalog showed two models of lightweight utility railroad motor cars, used for patrol cars, inspection and section use. The 56W used an air-cooled Wisconsin 4 cycle 2-cylinder motor, rated at 16.4 horsepower (12.2 kW). Transmission was a synchromesh gearbox with two forward speeds and two reverse. A roller chain connected the transmission to the rear axle. Timken roller bearings, 16-inch (410 mm) insulated wheels, and cast iron four-wheel brakes, were standard, adding up to a weight of 895 pounds (406 kg) without a cab. The 57W contained an air-cooled Wisconsin 4-cycle 1-cylinder motor, rated at 9.2 horsepower (6.9 kW). The weight of that model was 790 pounds (360 kg). Extra equipment included two different types of cab, gong, coupler, electric starter and generator. Perhaps surprisingly, magneto ignition was still standard in 1960.

Kalamazoo railroad motor cars were good sellers overseas, particularly in South America and Australia. In fact, the generic term for railroad motor car in Australia was "Kalamazoo". In contrast, the company was never more than a minor player within the United States, most railroads having just a few of the cars. Perhaps the company's best-known wartime product was "Galloping Gertie", a railroad motor car with a large target above it, used for gunnery practice.

Larger railroad motor cars were the models 27A (10-man capacity), 27AW-F (10-man capacity), and 38B-F (14-man capacity). Adding side steps could double the number of men carried. The 27A had an air-cooled four-cylinder Wisconsin engine with magneto ignition and a Zenith carburetor, that developed 22 horsepower (16 kW). The 27AW-F and 38B-F had a water-cooled four-cylinder Ford engine that developed 40 horsepower (30 kW). Other 1960 products that ran on rails included a power tamping jack, a ballast equalizer with plow and sweeper, a spike driver, and a line of trailers and push carts. Track gauges and levels, plus portable setoff assembly and take-off rails, rounded out the catalog.

== Sale of railroad business ==
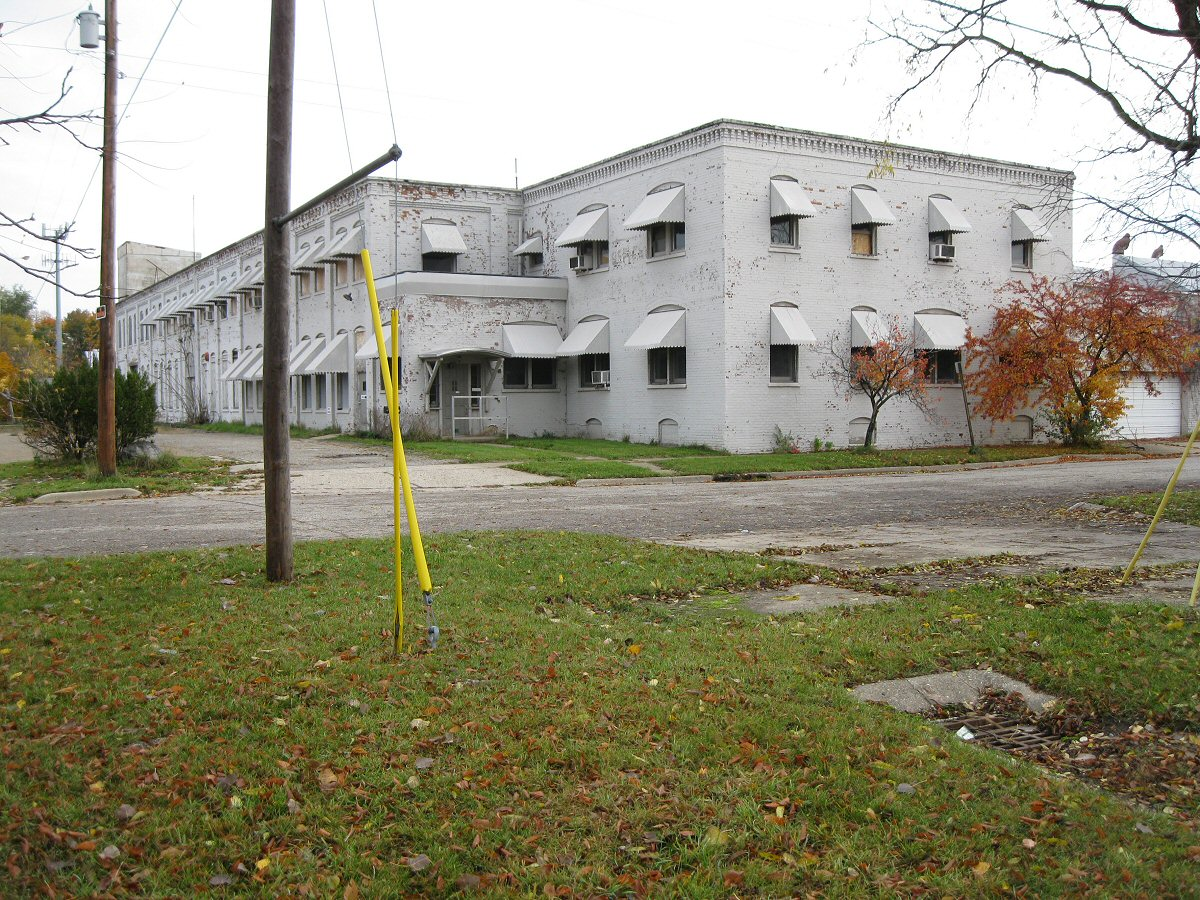
The office of the former Reed St. manufacturing building in 2009

In 1968, the railroad business of the company was bought out by Tamper Inc. of Columbia, South Carolina, after which, all railroad equipment was built in South Carolina under the Tamper brand. Tamper merged with Fairmont in the 1990s, which was then bought by Harsco Corporation.

Meanwhile, the company continued to build Speed Truck products. The model K45 was the largest platform truck in their 1960s catalogs, with a 3,000-pound (1,400 kg) payload. The model 2500 platform truck could carry 2,000 pounds (910 kg), as could the Model E1900 Low Bed Electric. The Kal-Truk was a three-wheel carrier most often used as a dump truck. It could carry 30,000 pounds (14,000 kg). Finally, there was a small electric runabout, the "Economizer," which was a personnel carrier only.

The company manufactured four passenger vehicles for use at the 1964-65 New York World's Fair. That custom model was called an "Escorter" and a total of 150 were made. In 1966, Kalamazoo's Hawk family, who had owned a controlling interest in the company since 1953, bought out the remaining shares.

== Final years ==
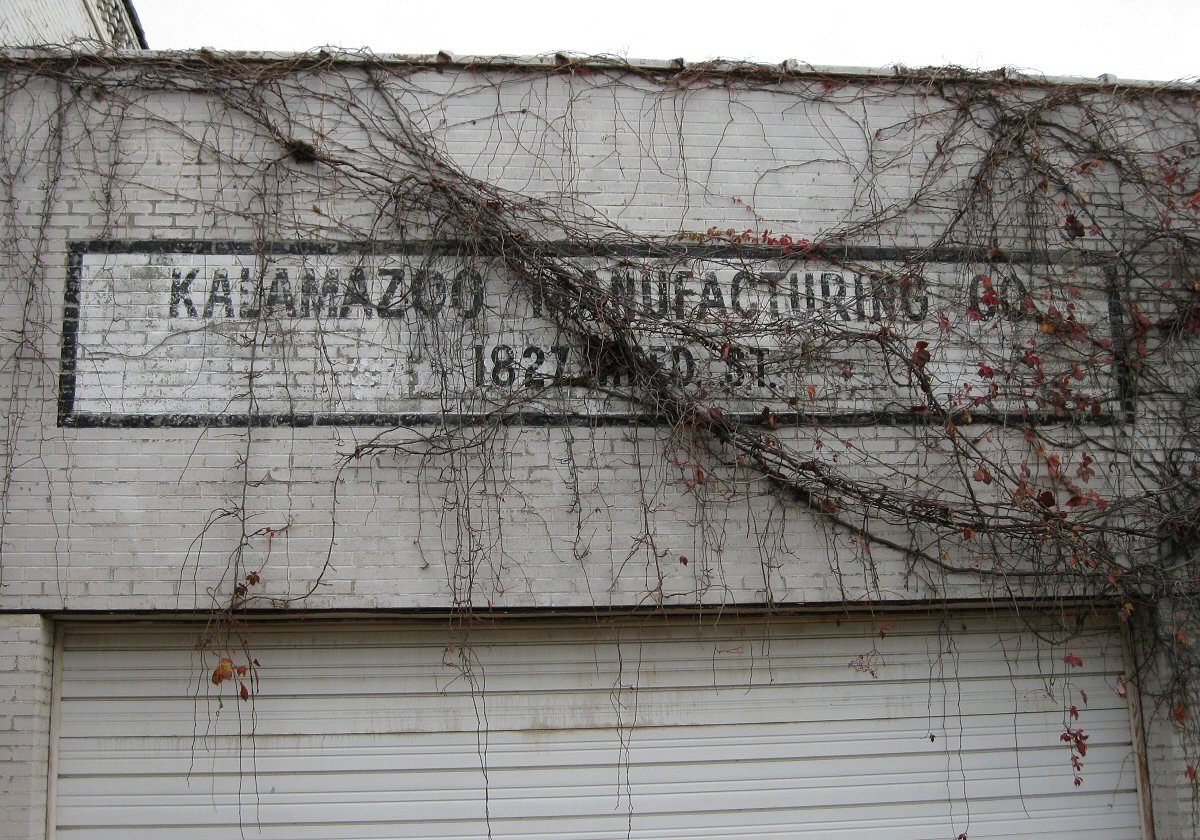
The faded name on the Reed St. manufacturing building in 2009

Despite a number of strikes by the unionized workforce, the Kalamazoo Manufacturing Company continued building its personnel and materials carriers, reaching the company centennial in 1983. The firm continued its existence until the 1990s, when all the assets were sold to Taylor-Dunn, a large manufacturer of in-plant materials handling vehicles. The Kalamazoo factory closed so quietly it was not reported in the local newspaper.

Until 2015, the factory in Reed Street, Kalamazoo, was used for storage by a local warehousing company called LC Howard, after which it was demolished. No traces of the Kalamazoo Manufacturing Company remain in Kalamazoo. Fortunately a number of Kalamazoo railroad motor cars and Speed Trucks around the world have been restored for personal enjoyment.
