= North American Railcar Operators Association =

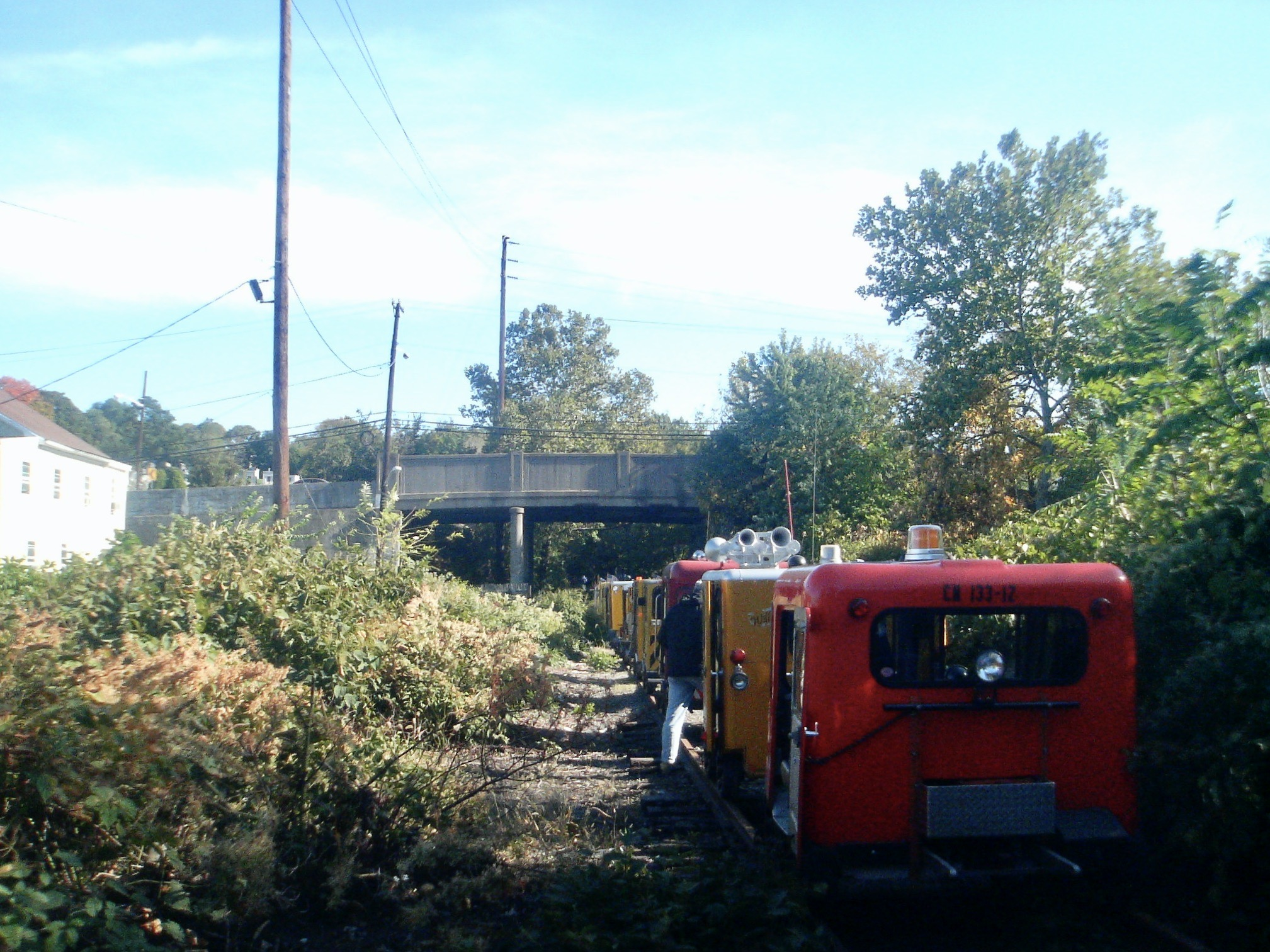
- NARCOA rail speeder run stopped near the western portal of the NYSW Edgewater tunnel
- Abbreviation: NARCOA
- Formation: January 9, 1989
- Type: Incorporated Non-Profit
- Members: 1,400
- President: Mark North
- Website: www.narcoa.org

The North American Railcar Operators Association (NARCOA) is a non-profit organization dedicated to the preservation, restoration, and safe, legal operation of railroad equipment historically used for maintenance of way purposes. The organization is primarily composed of those who own and operate a personal railcar speeder. NARCOA has around 1,400 members worldwide.

== History ==
NARCOA started in 1980 as a list of motorcar owners, known as "The NARCOA Roster." In 1986, NARCOA organized the first private-owner motorcar meet ever held. In 1987, NARCOA began publication of its official newsletter, The Setoff. In 1989 the group incorporated in Delaware as a non-profit organization in the State of Delaware and received US Internal Revenue Service determination as a 501(c)(7) entity. In 1988, It was incorporated as a non-profit organization in Delaware, and started the NARCOA insurance program that year as well, which is an insurance program for member railcar operators.

In 2016, it had 900 speeders and 1,700 members registered with NARCOA. At that time, it sometimes organized rail rides by NARCOA members at various events.

== Services provided ==
NARCOA provides several services for members. These services include:

- Safety Program - The organization is focused on safe railcar operations. NARCOA publishes a rule book that outlines safe operating practices and rail motorcar standards. Safety meetings precede each rail excursion. Each issue of The Setoff includes safety information. Proper safety equipment is required for participants in each rail excursion. A judicial committee enforces safety policy and sanctions violators.
- Insurance - NARCOA arranges for operating insurance that rail car operators must purchase, on an annual basis, before taking part in a rail excursion.
- Operator Testing and Mentoring - New operators must complete a written test before being permitted to purchase insurance. New operators must complete mentoring under the guidance of an experienced operator during their first rail excursion.
- Close cooperation with the American Short Line and Regional Railroad Association, the industry association of railroads that normally host railcar excursions.
- Technical Information - NARCOA maintains a library of motorcar technical and historical information for member use.
- Federal Railroad Administration Liaison - NARCOA maintains an ongoing dialogue with the Federal Railroad Administration (FRA) on safety and regulatory issues affecting the hobby.

== Rail motorcar excursions ==
NARCOA affiliated regional clubs conduct rail excursions for owners to operate their cars. Motorcar operators, at their option, sometimes let others ride along. Participation fees vary, with areas such as Mexico's Copper Canyon attracting interest as "the ultimate speeder trip." To participate in an excursion, participants are given training. A NARCOA coordinator plans the event. The speeders average 20 to 25 miles per hour. Trips can last a day or several days, and longer trips are made in legs. All operators on the trips are "mentored, tested and have liability insurance," and must can a rule book and an insurance card. Alcoholic beverages and illegal drugs are prohibited. All NARCOA sponsored excursions are listed on the association website.

Among other events, on June 25 and 26, 2013, members of NARCOA operated their privately owned railroad motorcars over the Leadville, Colorado and Southern Railroad in Colorado. There was a 20-day tour of the Pacific Northwest railroads in 2015 and a 2015 excursion for three days from Coos Bay to Coquille, Oregon Coquille and in Napa Valley. Among other events, there was a 2016 in Kokomo, Indiana , a trip from Anchorage to Fairbanks in a 22-car caravan of old railroad work cars in 2018, and a trip from White River Junction to Newport, Rhode Island Newport in 2019.

== Membership ==
Maintenance of membership is subject to the standards of conduct found in the rulebook. A general railfan interest, willingness to adhere to safety rules, a mechanical ability to restore and maintain a rail motorcar, and some knowledge of railroad operations are characteristics of most NARCOA members.

In 2008, NARCOA had "about 2,000 members, and about 200 new members sign up yearly."

== Leadership ==
An 11-member Board of Directors governs NARCOA. The Board meets annually. A nominating committee selects candidates for association offices, including directors, president, vice-president, secretary, and treasurer. Board members are elected to two-year terms that represent the following areas:

- Area 1 - (CT, MA, ME, NH, NY, RI, VT)
- Area 2 - (DE, MD, NJ, PA)
- Area 3 - (IN, MI, OH)
- Area 4 - (KY, NC, SC, TN, VA. WV)
- Area 5 - (AL, GA, FL, MS)
- Area 6 - (IL. MN, WI)
- Area 7 - (IA, ND, NE, SD)
- Area 8 - (All of Canada and Australia)
- Area 9 - (AR, CO, KS, LA, MO, OK, TX)
- Area 10 - (AK, ID, MT. OR, WA. WY)
- Area 11 - (AZ. CA, Hl, NM, NV, UT)

== See also ==
- Avalon Rail, passenger railcar restoration and rebuilding company
