= Avalon Rail =

Coordinates: 43.021204°N 87.99578°W

Avalon Rail Inc.
- Industry: Railcar restoration
- Founded: 2000
- Headquarters: West Allis, Wisconsin, United States
- Key people: June Garland, President
- Website: web.archive.org/web/20191218011338/http://www.avalonrail.com/, 2019 archive

Avalon Rail Inc. was a passenger railcar restoration and rebuilding company in West Allis, Wisconsin, United States, a community near Milwaukee. June Garland was the company's president.

The company was founded in 2000 by former employees of Northern Rail Car Corporation, a railcar manufacturer then owned by William E. Gardner, who also owned the Wisconsin and Southern Railroad.

The company said that it was interested in subcontracting assembly work from manufacturers such as Talgo.

In October 2009, it was awarded a contract by Via Rail Canada for rebuilding eight Château sleeping cars and four Park sleeper-dome-lounge cars originally built by the Budd Company.

== Closing ==
The company filed articles of dissolution with the Wisconsin Department of Financial Institutions on November 22, 2019.

In March 2021, some of the company's equipment was auctioned off by Gerlach Companies, Inc.
