= New York State Route 375 =

State highway in Ulster County, New York, US

New York State Route 375
- West Hurley Road; Levon Helm Memorial Boulevard
- Map of the Ashokan Reservoir and vicinity with NY 375 highlighted in red

Route information
- Maintained by NYSDOT
- Length: 2.92 mi (4.70 km)
- Existed: 1930–present

Major junctions
- South end: NY 28 in Hurley
- North end: NY 212 in Woodstock

Location
- Country: United States
- State: New York
- Counties: Ulster

Highway system
- New York Highways; Interstate; US; State; Reference; Parkways
← NY 374	→ NY 376

New York State Route 375 (NY 375), locally known as West Hurley Road for its entire length, is a short highway in the Catskill Park located entirely within Ulster County, New York, in the United States. It primarily allows for more direct access from nearby Kingston to Woodstock. It runs north–south from NY 28 at West Hurley to near the business district of Woodstock, where it terminates at another state highway, NY 212. The route was designated in the 1930 renumbering in New York, replacing a piece of legislative Route 5 from 1908 and has remained unchanged since.

== Route description ==
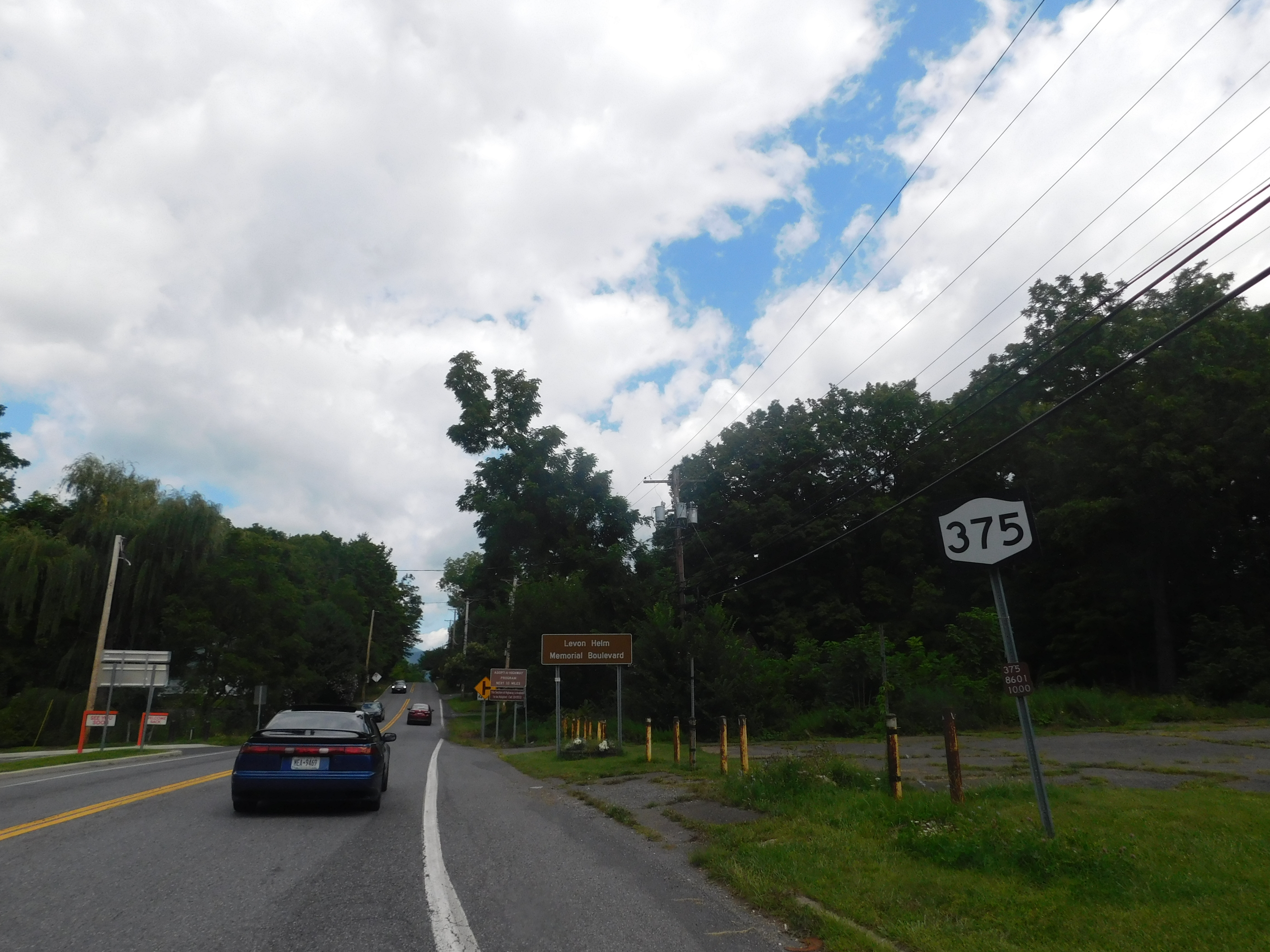
NY 375 northbound from NY 28 in West Hurley

NY 375 begins at an intersection with NY 28 (the Onteora Trail) in the community of West Hurley. The route progresses northward through a densely populated area, passing residential homes and commercial buildings. The highway at the intersection with Pine Street, passing a local sports field, and leaving West Hurley for the rural parts of the Catskill Park. The route continues to wind, and after a distance, intersects the eastern terminus of Maverick Road (County Route 43). The route continues northward, passing the Woodstock Golf Club before entering the hamlet of Woodstock, where NY 375 ends at an intersection with NY 212 (Mill Hill Road) just outside Woodstock.

== History ==
The north–south highway linking West Hurley to Woodstock was originally designated as part of Route 5, an unsigned legislative route, by the New York State Legislature in 1908. Route 5 continued east of West Hurley on modern NY 28 and west of Woodstock on what is now NY 212. The section of Route 5 between West Hurley and Woodstock was designated as the signed NY 375 as part of the 1930 renumbering of state highways in New York.

In 2013, NY 375 was officially designated Levon Helm Memorial Boulevard in memory of the late Mark Lavon "Levon" Helm, a local resident best known for his work as drummer and vocalist for The Band.

== Major intersections ==
The entire route is in Ulster County.

Location	mi	km	Destinations	Notes
Town of Hurley	0.00	0.00	NY 28 (Onteora Trail) – Kingston, Phoenicia	Southern terminus; hamlet of West Hurley
Town of Woodstock	2.92	4.70	NY 212 (Mill Hall Road) – Bearsville, Saugerties	Northern terminus; hamlet of Woodstock
1.000 mi = 1.609 km; 1.000 km = 0.621 mi
