= List of county routes in Ulster County, New York =

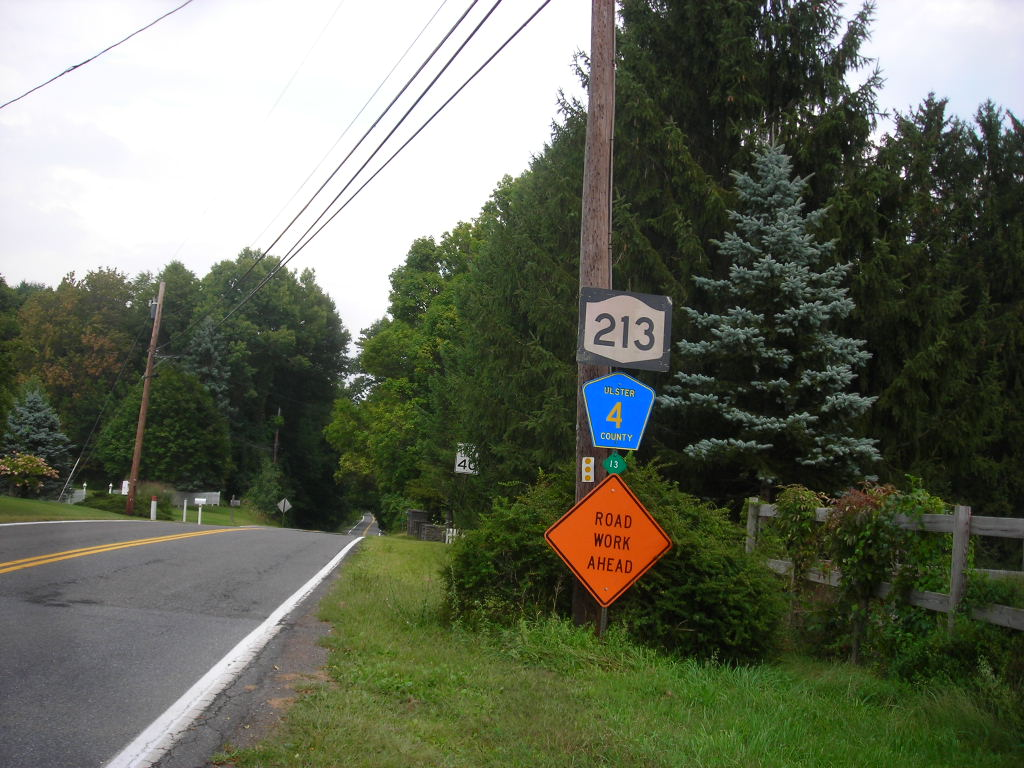
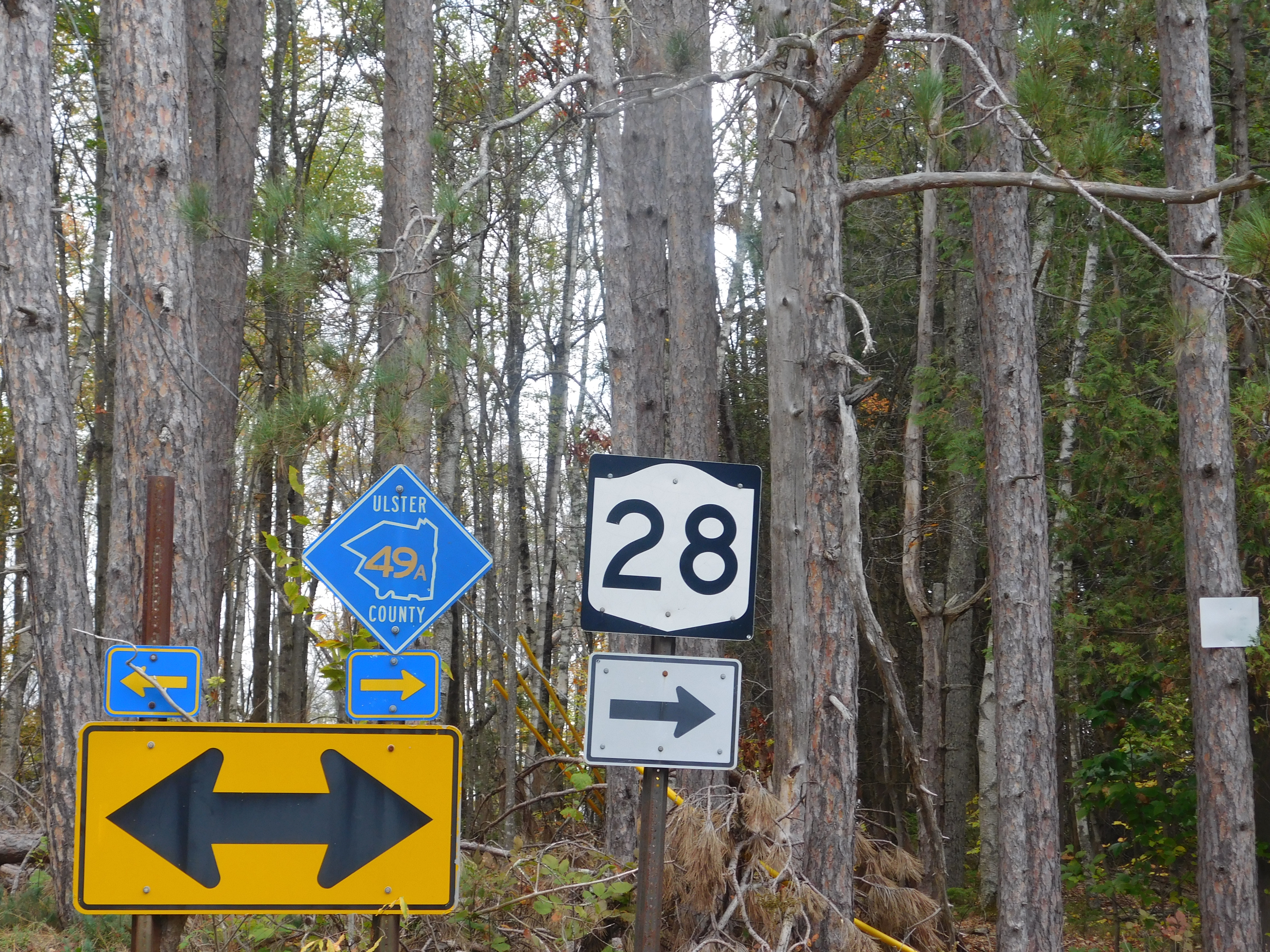
- The current and former standards of county route signage in Ulster County, along NY 213 in the town of Olive and on CR 49A in Highmount.

Highway names
- Interstates: Interstate X (I-X)
- US Highways: U.S. Route X (US X)
- State: New York State Route X (NY X)
- County: County Route X (CR X)

System links
- New York Highways; Interstate; US; State; Reference; Parkways

County routes in Ulster County, New York, are mostly signed with the Manual on Uniform Traffic Control Devices-standard yellow-on-blue pentagon route marker, however, several routes are still marked with very faded, sometimes illegible blue diamond shaped markers with white or yellow lettering, and the route number inside of an outline of the county, similar to those old markers in Orange County. All roads maintained by Ulster County are assigned a county highway (CH) number; this number is posted on small green signs placed below the route marker but is otherwise unsigned. Each county route comprises one or more county highways; however, not all county highways are part of a signed county route.

== County routes ==
Route	Length (mi)	Length (km)	From	Via	To	Notes
CR 1	14.08	22.660	US 209 in Rochester	Lucas Turnpike (CH 58, CH 123, CH 59, and CH 50)	Kingston city line in Ulster	
CR 2	8.12	13.068	CR 3 in Olive	Krumville (CH 106) and Kripplebush (CH 63) roads	US 209 in Marbletown	
CR 2A	3.30	5.31	CR 2	Krumville Road (CH 63) in Olive	NY 213 / CR 4	
CR 3	13.51	21.74	US 209 in Rochester	Pataukunk (CH 29) and Samsonville (CH 76 and CH 53) roads	NY 28A in Olive	
CR 4	8.54	13.74	NY 28A in Olive	Atwood Road (CH 20 and CH 13)	US 209 in Marbletown	Entire length overlaps with NY 213
CR 5	8.50	13.68	NY 213 / CR 4 in Marbletown	Tongore Road, Hurley Mountain Road (CH 14, CH 8, and CH 132)	NY 28 in Ulster	
CR 6	9.75	15.69	US 209 in Rochester	Kyserike (CH 29A), Clove (CH 156), and Mountain Rest (CH 95) roads	CR 7 in New Paltz	
CR 6A	2.85	4.59	CR 6	Mountain Rest Road (CH 95) in Marbletown	NY 213	
CR 7 (1)	29.76	47.89	Sullivan County line in Shawangunk (becomes CR 61)	Burlingham (CH 98) and New Prospect (CH 39B) roads, Bruynswick Avenue (CH 6 and CH 74), Albany Post, Libertyville (CH 61), Springtown (CH 18A), and Elting roads, Keator Avenue, James Street (CH 113), and Binnewater Road (CH 59)	NY 213 in Rosendale	Discontinuous at NY 52; overlaps with NY 299 near New Paltz village
CR 7 (2)	0.14	0.23	CR 7 (segment 1)	Libertyville Road (CH 61) in New Paltz	New Paltz village line	Entire length overlaps with NY 299
CR 7A	2.59	4.17	CR 7	McKinstry Road (CH 127) in Gardiner	CR 9	
CR 8	4.83	7.77	US 44 / NY 55 in Gardiner	CH 117	CR 7 in New Paltz	Entire length overlaps with NY 299
CR 9	8.27	13.31	Orange County line in Shawangunk (becomes CR 14)	Albany Post Road (CH 79)	CR 7 in Gardiner	
CR 10	7.33	11.80	US 44 / NY 55 in Plattekill	Milton Turnpike (CH 68, CH 16, and CH 119)	Hudson River in Marlborough	
CR 11	9.43	15.18	Orange County line in Marlborough	Lattintown (CH 69, CH 85, and CH 17), Milton Cross, Orchard (CH 55), and Chapel Hill (CH 108) roads	US 9W in Lloyd	
CR 12	3.31	5.33	NY 299	New Paltz Road (CH 159) in Lloyd	North Road	
CR 13	4.28	6.89	NY 32	Plattekill–Ardonia Road (CH 25) in Plattekill	US 44 / NY 55	
CR 14	6.70	10.78	Orange County line in Plattekill	East and Plattekill roads (CH 140 and CH 69) and Western Avenue (CH 17)	US 9W in Marlborough	
CR 14A	1.60	2.57	CR 14	Western Avenue (CH 17) in Marlborough	CR 11	
CR 15	10.37	16.69	CR 13 in Plattekill	Fosler (CH 144), Tuckers Corners (CH 24A), Pancake Hollow (CH 67), and Riverside (CH 84) roads	US 9W in Lloyd	Discontinuous at US 44 / NY 55
CR 16	6.57	10.57	NY 213	Old Post Road (CH 82) in Esopus	US 9W	
CR 17	6.20	9.98	NY 208	Jansen (CH 158), Putt Corners, and Horsenden (CH 154) roads in New Paltz	NY 32	Discontinuous at southern junctions with NY 32
CR 18	6.44	10.36	NY 208	Wallkill Avenue (CH 122), Bruyn Turnpike, and Hoagerburgh Road (CH 70) in Shawangunk	CR 7	Discontinuous, crosses through part of Orange County where it is signed as Wallkill Avenue
CR 18A	1.18	1.90	CR 18	Long Lane (CH 148) in Shawangunk	CR 9	
CR 19	3.40	5.47	CR 9 in Shawangunk	Sand Hill Road (CH 129)	US 44 / NY 55 in Gardiner	
CR 20 (1)	2.32	3.73	NY 208	New Hurley Road (CH 96) in Plattekill	Old NY 32	
CR 20 (2)	1.54	2.48	Orange County line (becomes CR 23)	Forest Road (CH 23A) in Plattekill	NY 32	
CR 21	4.14	6.66	Orange County line in Shawangunk (becomes CR 85)	Plains Road (CH 112)	NY 208 in Plattekill	
CR 22	3.11	5.01	US 44 / NY 55	South Street (CH 23 and CH 11) in Lloyd	NY 299	
CR 22A	2.50	4.02	CR 22 in Lloyd	Station and South Ohioville roads (CH 12 and CH 18B)	NY 299 in New Paltz	
CR 23	3.29	5.29	Orange County line	Orchard Drive (CH 24) in Plattekill	US 44 / NY 55	
CR 24	8.23	13.24	NY 213	Union Center (CH 4) and River (CH 81) roads in Esopus	US 9W	Split into two segments by part of CR 124 and US 9W
CR 25 (1)	4.08	6.57	NY 32	Creek Locks Road (CH 73) in Rosendale	NY 32	
CR 25 (2)	4.90	7.89	CR 25 (segment 1) in Rosendale	Creek Locks (CH 146 and CH 65) and New Salem (CH 57) roads	US 9W in Esopus	Discontinuous at NY 213
CR 26	4.54	7.31	US 209 in Marbletown	Cottekill Road, Sawdust Avenue (CH 72), and Breezy Hill Road (CH 147)	NY 32 in Rosendale	
CR 26A	0.77	1.24	NY 213	Cottekill Road (CH 88) in Rosendale	CR 26	
CR 27	4.46	7.18	US 44 / NY 55	Granite Road (CH 111) in Rochester	US 209	
CR 28 (1)	4.90	7.89	CR 29 in Hurley	Zandhoek and DeWitt Mills roads (CH 94 and CH 65)	CR 25 in Ulster	
CR 28 (2)	0.72	1.16	CR 28 (segment 1)	Mountain Road (CH 153) in Ulster	NY 213	
CR 29	3.33	5.36	US 209 in Hurley	Hurley Avenue Extension (CH 151)	Kingston city line in Ulster	Former routing of US 209
CR 29A	0.73	1.17	CR 5	Wynkoop Road (CH 8) in Hurley	US 209	
CR 30	6.07	9.77	NY 212 in Woodstock	Sawkill Road (CH 52, CH 75, CH 10, and CH 42)	CR 31 in Ulster	
CR 31 (1)	11.20	18.02	Washington Avenue in Ulster	Sawkill (CH 42) and Sawkill–Ruby (CH 90) roads and Kings Highway (CH 41, CH 33, and CH 32)	NY 212 in Saugerties	
CR 31 (2)	1.32	2.12	US 9W	Leggs Mill Road (CH 41) in Ulster	CR 31 (segment 1)	
CR 32	7.75	12.47	CR 33 in Woodstock	Glasco Turnpike (CH 136, CH 34, and CH 118)	Dead end at Hudson River in Saugerties	
CR 33 (1)	10.35	16.66	NY 212 in Woodstock	Glasco Turnpike and West Saugerties Road (CH 131, CH 135, and CH 51)	CR 35 in Saugerties	
CR 33 (2)	0.58	0.93	NY 212	Rock City Road (CH 47A) in Woodstock	CR 33 (segment 1)	
CR 33 (3)	0.42	0.68	CR 33 (segment 2)	Byrdcliff Road (CH 47B) in Woodstock	CR 33 (segment 1)	
CR 33 (4)	0.45	0.72	Platt Clove & Becker Roads	West Saugerties Road (CH 51) in Saugerties	CR 33 (segment 1)	
CR 34 (1)	2.94	4.73	NY 32	Malden Turnpike (CH 89) in Saugerties	US 9W	
CR 34 (2)	2.85	4.59	NY 32	Kings Highway (CH 31) in Saugerties	Greene County line (becomes CR 47)	
CR 35	5.08	8.18	NY 212	Blue Mountain Road (CH 51 and CH 64) in Saugerties	NY 32	
CR 36	1.99	3.20	CR 35	Harry Wells Road (CH 120) in Saugerties	NY 32	
CR 37 (1)	4.91	7.90	NY 32 in Ulster	Ulster Landing Road (CH 60 and CH 99)	NY 32 in Saugerties	
CR 37 (2)	0.78	1.26	NY 32	Kukuk Lane (CH 152) in Ulster	CR 37 (segment 1)	
CR 39	2.56	4.12	NY 28 in Woodstock	Zena Road (CH 52)	CR 30 in Woodstock	
CR 40 (1)	12.32	19.83	NY 214 in Shandaken	Old Route 28 (CH 160) and Wittenberg (CH 91), Glenford Mountain, and Yankeetown (CH 142) roads	CR 41 in Hurley	
CR 40 (2)	0.35	0.56	NY 28	Bridge Street (CH 155) in Shandaken	CR 40 (segment 1)	
CR 41	3.50	5.63	Old Route 28 in Hurley	Ohayo Mountain Road (CH 114)	NY 212 in Woodstock	
CR 42	6.87	11.06	CR 46 in Denning	Peekamoose and Watson Hollow roads (CH 139)	NY 28A in Olive	
CR 43	1.96	3.15	NY 28	Maverick Road (CH 66) in Hurley	NY 375	
CR 44	3.04	4.89	NY 28	Mountain Road (CH 87) in Olive	NY 28	
CR 45	2.62	4.22	CR 40	Wittenberg Road (CH 46) in Woodstock	NY 212	
CR 46	9.70	15.61	NY 55A in Wawarsing	Yagerville (CH 101) and Sundown (CH 2) roads	Sullivan County line in Denning (becomes CR 153)	
CR 47	23.48	37.79	Sullivan County line in Denning (becomes CR 157)	Frost Valley (CH 1) and Oliverea (CH 92) roads and Creekside Drive (CH 150)	NY 42 in Shandaken	Part south of NY 28 was formerly part of NY 42
CR 49	3.77	6.07	End of county maintenance	Dry Brook Road (CH 7A) in Hardenburgh	Delaware County line	
CR 49A	3.41	5.49	CR 49 in Hardenburgh	Todd Mountain and Gelli Curci roads (CH 145)	NY 28 in Shandaken	Part enters Delaware County
CR 50	4.32	6.95	Marbletown town line in Hurley	Spillway (CH 8A) and Stony Hollow (CH 130) roads	NY 28	Split into two segments by an NYCDOT-maintained section of NY 28A; east segment entirely overlaps with NY 28A
CR 51	1.91	3.07	Froners Road	Morgan Hill Road (CH 83) in Hurley	NY 28A / CR 50	
CR 52	8.83	14.21	Sullivan County line in Wawarsing (becomes CR 154)	Ulster Heights Road and Cape Avenue (CH 56)	NY 52 in Ellenville	
CR 53	6.20	9.98	Towne Road	Briggs Highway (CH 78) in Wawarsing	NY 52	
CR 53A	1.31	2.11	Sullivan County line (becomes CR 158)	Milk Road (CH 149) in Wawarsing	NY 52	
CR 54	6.36	10.24	Sullivan County line (becomes CR 152)	Turnwood Road (CH 102) in Hardenburgh	Cross Mountain Road	
CR 124	2.15	3.46	US 9W	Ulster Avenue (CH 124) in Esopus	US 9W	
CR 157	1.17	1.88	US 9W	Boices Lane and Enterprise Drive (CH 157) in Ulster	US 209	
CR 161	1.68	2.70	US 9W	Frank E. Sottile Boulevard (CH 161) in Ulster	NY 32	
CR 162	0.35	0.56	US 9W	Miron Lane (CH 162) in Ulster	CR 161	

== County highways ==
Every county-maintained road is assigned an unsigned county highway number for inventory purposes. The majority of county highways are part of signed county routes; however, some are not posted with any designation. Those highways or parts of highways that are not part of any county routes are listed below.

Route	Length (mi)	Length (km)	From	Via	To	Notes
CH 8A	0.80	1.29	End of county maintenance	Spillway Road in Marbletown	Hurley town line (becomes CR 50)	
CH 22	0.32	0.51	US 44 / NY 55	Maple Avenue in Plattekill	CR 22	
CH 44	2.36	3.80	NY 52	Greenfield Road in Wawarsing	NY 52	
CH 77	1.26	2.03	US 209	Main Street and Minnewaska Trail in Wawarsing	US 44 / NY 55	
CH 80	0.51	0.82	Sullivan County line (becomes CR 55)	Spring Glen Road in Wawarsing	Old US 209	
CH 97	3.56	5.73	CR 32	Fishcreek and Highwoods roads and Wrolsen Drive in Saugerties	NY 212	
CH 103	2.26	3.64	CR 30 in Kingston	Hallihans Hill Road	CR 31 in Ulster	
CH 104	1.51	2.43	NY 52	Cragsmoor Road in Wawarsing	Dellenbaugh Road	
CH 109	9.10	14.65	CR 7 in Shawangunk	Awosting, Decker, and Tillson Lake roads	CR 7 in Shawangunk	Also includes Awosting Road west to Upper Mountain Road and Oregon Trail Road between Crawford and CR 7
CH 116	2.19	3.52	CH 22 in Plattekill	Crescent Avenue	CR 15 in Lloyd	
CH 128	0.74	1.19	US 209	Main Street and Plank and Institution roads in Wawarsing	Rondout Creek bridge	
CH 137	0.05	0.08	NY 28A / CR 50	Connector in Kingston	NY 28	

== See also ==
- County routes in New York
