= New York State Route 28 =

Highway in New York

New York State Route 28
- NY 28 highlighted in red, and former alignments maintained as reference routes in blue

Route information
- Maintained by NYSDOT and the village of Cooperstown
- Length: 281.69 mi (453.34 km)
- Existed: 1924–present

Major junctions
- South end: NY 32 in Kingston
- I-87 Toll / New York Thruway in Kingston; I-88 / NY 23 in Oneonta; NY 80 in Cooperstown; US 20 in Richfield Springs; I-90 Toll / New York Thruway in Herkimer; NY 5 in Herkimer; NY 12 from Trenton to Alder Creek; NY 30 in Blue Mountain Lake
- North end: US 9 in Warrensburg

Location
- Country: United States
- State: New York
- Counties: Ulster, Delaware, Otsego, Herkimer, Oneida, Hamilton, Warren

Highway system
- New York Highways; Interstate; US; State; Reference; Parkways
← NY 27A	→ NY 28A
← NY 531	I-587	→ I-590

New York State Route 28 (NY 28) is a state highway extending for 281.69 miles (453.34 km) in the shape of a "C" between the Hudson Valley city of Kingston and southern Warren County in the U.S. state of New York. Along the way, it intersects several major routes, including Interstate 88 (I-88), U.S. Route 20 (US 20), and the New York State Thruway twice. The southern terminus of NY 28 is at NY 32 in Kingston and the northern terminus is at US 9 in Warrensburg. In Kingston, NY 28 is co-designated as Interstate 587 from its southern terminus at NY 32 to the roundabout linking it to the Thruway (I-87).

NY 28 was originally assigned in 1924, to an alignment extending from Colliersville in the south to Utica in the north via Ilion. From Colliersville to Cooperstown, the highway followed its current routing (excluding minor realignments); north of Cooperstown, NY 28 was routed along several state highways that now have other designations. The route was extended south to Kingston and north to Warrensburg as part of the 1930 renumbering of state highways in New York. At the same time, NY 28 was realigned between Cooperstown and Mohawk to follow its modern routing. Other than minor realignments in Kingston, Oneonta, Herkimer, and Oneida County, NY 28 has remained the same to this day.

== Route description ==
=== Ulster County ===
NY 28's southern terminus is with NY 32 (Albany Avenue) in the city of Kingston. The route heads north, then northwest on Colonel Chandler Drive, a four-lane freeway. The roadway is also designated and signed as I-587, which begins at NY 32 as well. Although Colonel Chandler Drive is built to Interstate Highway standards, it has no intermediary interchanges. After crossing over the Esopus Creek into Ulster, I-587 terminates at a roundabout that links I-587 and NY 28 to the New York State Thruway (I-87) at exit 19.

The Catskills

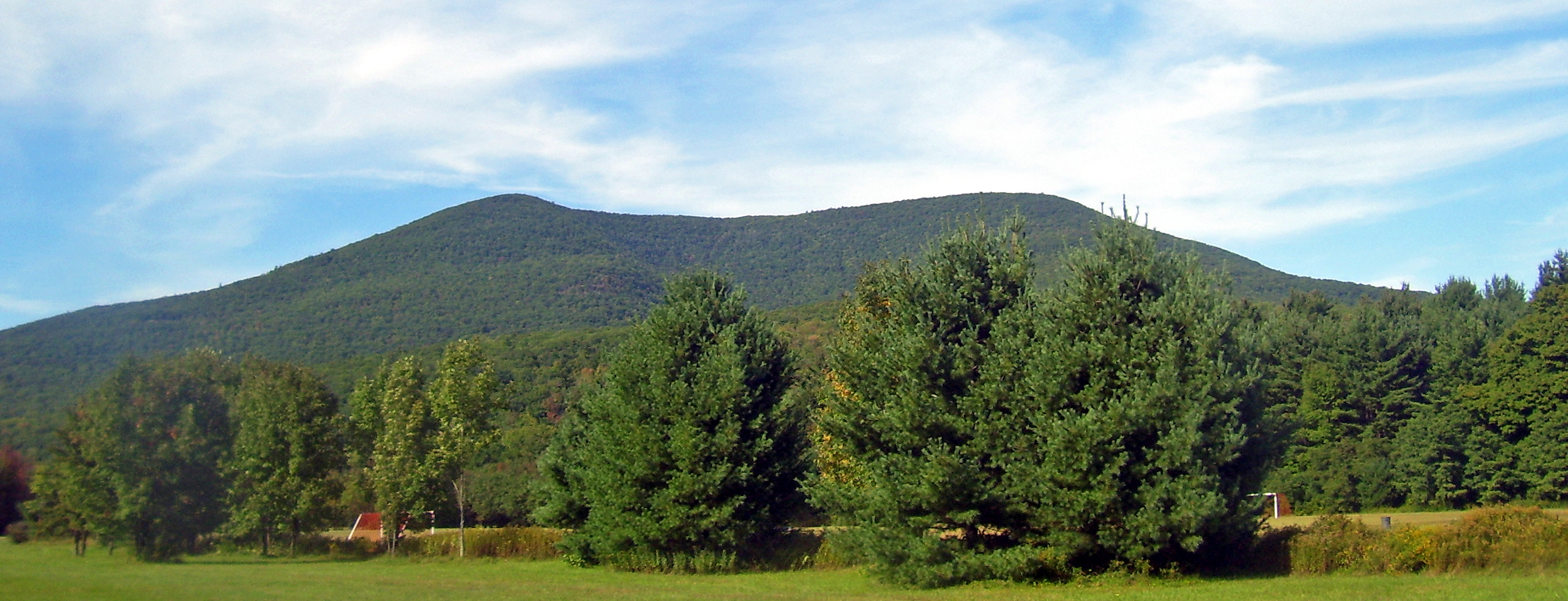
Mount Tremper

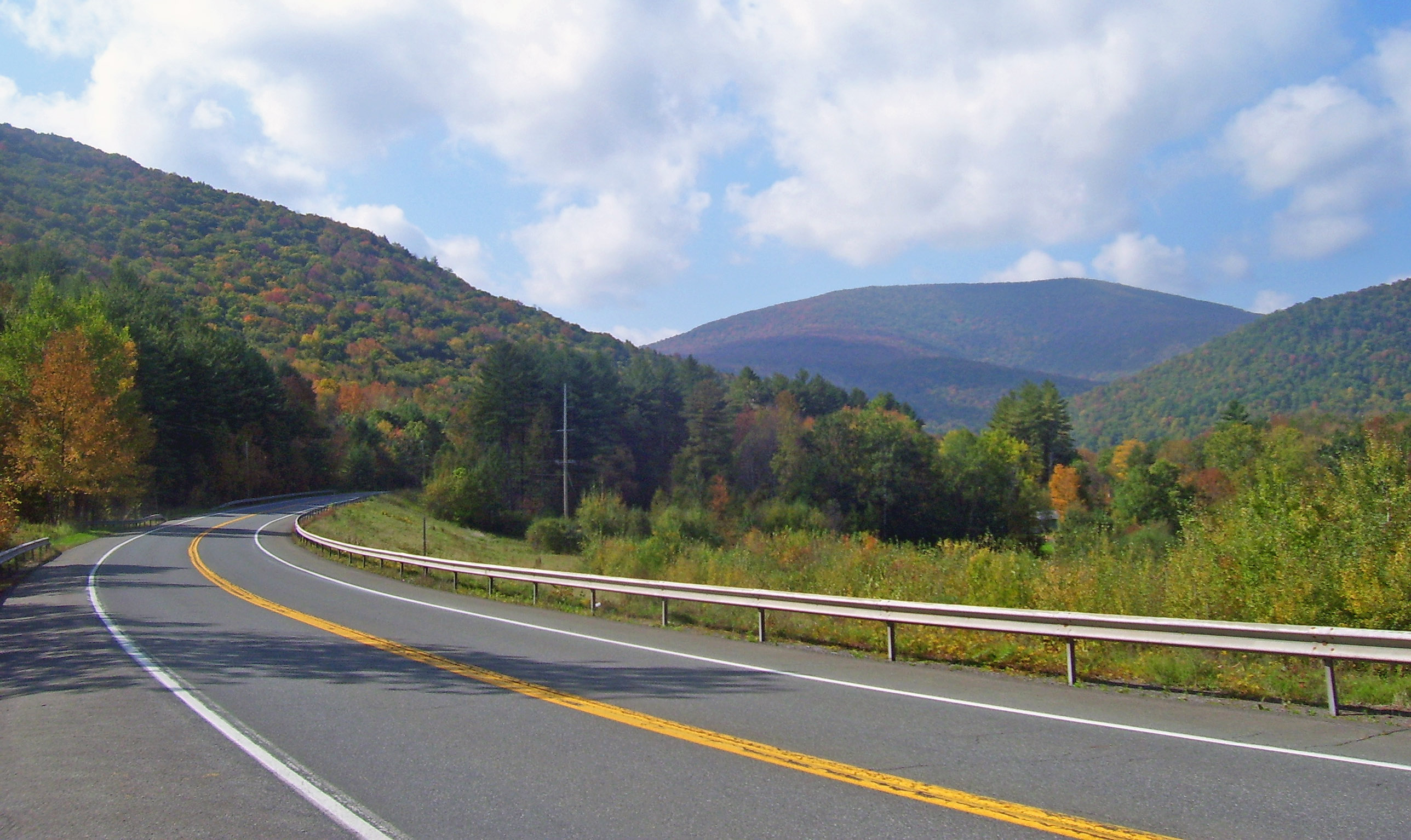
Balsam Mountain near Big Indian

West of I-87, the route becomes a four-lane undivided road and crosses the Blue Line of Catskill Park and becomes the Onteora Trail. Not long afterward, the highway meets US 209 by way of a cloverleaf interchange. Past US 209, the highway becomes a four-lane divided highway and enters a rural area as it heads northwest into the center of the state park.

Near the eastern tip of the Ashokan Reservoir, in the town of Kingston, NY 28 intersects the eastern terminus of NY 28A. West of NY 28A, NY 28 continues towards the north and west along the northern edge of the reservoir. In West Hurley, the route intersects the southern terminus of NY 375. It proceeds along the reservoir to its western end in the town of Olive community of Boiceville, where NY 28A reconnects to the route. Here the mountains begin to loom over the road, with Mount Tremper dominating the view to the north as the route continues along Esopus Creek into the town of Shandaken after passing the southern terminus of NY 212 at Mount Pleasant. At Phoenicia, the largest settlement since Kingston, NY 214 reaches its southern terminus at the highway.

Past Phoenicia, the surrounding slopes become steeper as the road and creek curve around Panther Mountain, one of the Catskill High Peaks, to the south. At Allaben, the Shandaken Tunnel crosses under the road, bringing water from Schoharie Reservoir into the creek. The road and creek start bending to the south to the hamlet of Shandaken, where the town hall on the south side of the road is followed by the southern terminus of NY 42's northern segment. As NY 28 continues trending southwest, the valley becomes less developed. Balsam Mountain, another High Peak, looms ahead.

The northern terminus of NY 42's southern segment marks the small hamlet of Big Indian, after which Esopus Creek crosses for the last time, turning south to its source at Winnisook Lake. The road begins a sustained climb over the next two miles paralleling an Esopus tributary, Birch Creek, up to Pine Hill. At the road to Belleayre Ski Center, in Highmount, the last junction before it leaves the Catskill Park and enters Delaware County, it is for the first time signed as a north–south route.

=== Delaware and Otsego counties ===
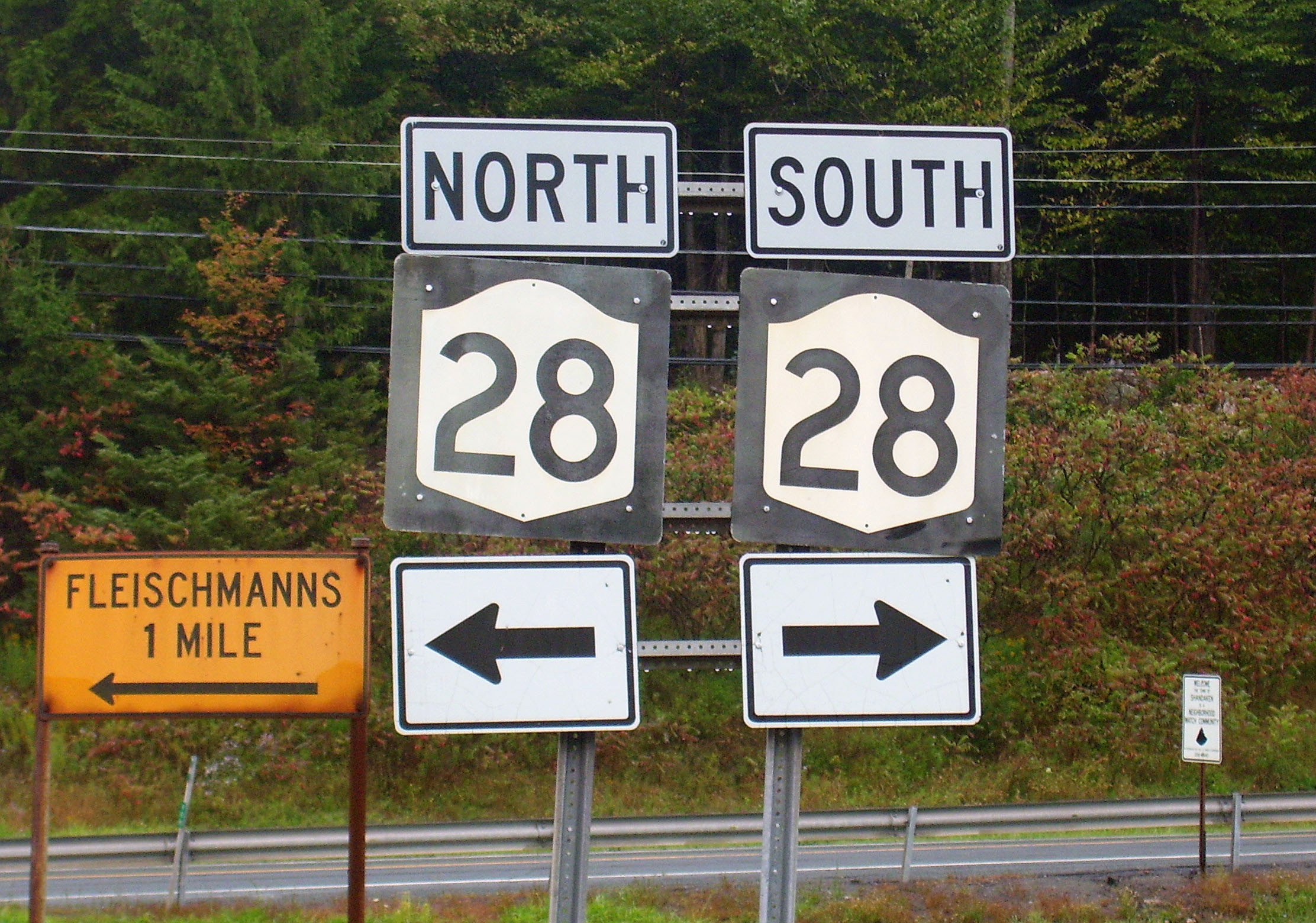
NY 28 becomes a north–south route just before the Delaware County line.

Across the county line in Middletown, the highway shifts towards the west. NY 28 begins a concurrency with NY 30 in Margaretville, with the routes paralleling the East Branch of the Delaware River. After crossing the Delaware River, the route ends its concurrency with NY 30, and NY 28 continues northwest through Andes as Main Street and Delaware Avenue. In the village of Delhi, the highway becomes known as Andes Road and has a short concurrency with NY 10 in the village center. North of Delhi, it continues north towards the hamlet of Meredith, proceeding west past the hamlet. In Franklin, NY 28 makes a 90-degree turn to the north at the roundabout intersection with the eastern end of NY 357.

Once in Otsego County, it traverses an s-curve before veering to the east to follow the southern bank of the Susquehanna River through the town of Oneonta. The route initially connects to the city of Oneonta, which is located across the river from NY 28, via Main Street. Shortly afterward, NY 28 meets NY 23. The route turns north, overlapping NY 23 along the four-lane James F. Lettis Highway. The two routes cross the River and enter the Oneonta city limits before separating at I-88 exit 15. NY 23 continues north on the arterial, while NY 28 joins I-88 eastward out of the city.

Back in the town of Oneonta, the overlap between NY 28 and I-88 continues along the northern bank of the Susquehanna toward the hamlet of Emmons, where the expressway meets County Route 47 (CR 47) at exit 16. The overlap ends at exit 17 in Milford; however, NY 28 remains in close proximity to the Susquehanna River, which turns northward at the interchange. Roughly 0.75 miles (1.21 km) north of I-88, the highway passes over NY 7 with no access between the two. After another 0.75 miles (1.21 km), the route meets D.K. Lifgren Drive (unsigned NY 992G), a connector providing access between Routes 7 and 28. North of Goodyear Lake, a body of water situated 1 mile (1.6 km) north of Lifgren Drive, the highway parallels the Susquehanna to the village of Milford, where it intersects the southern terminus of NY 166.

The highway continues northward along the banks of the Susquehanna to the village of Cooperstown, home to the National Baseball Hall of Fame. Inside the village, the route is initially known as Chestnut Street. Two blocks from the business district of the village, it intersects NY 80, which occupies Chestnut Street north of this point. Both routes turn west, overlapping each other as the routes leave the village. The portion of the highway between the southern border of the village of Cooperstown and the northern intersection with Grove Street is maintained by the village, and is the only section of the route not maintained by the New York State Department of Transportation (NYSDOT). Routes 28 and 80 head towards the northwest, passing by the now-abandoned Cooperstown Airport. In Otsego, the NY 28/80 concurrency ends at the intersection of NY 205. NY 28 continues northward as it passes Canadarago Lake. In Richfield Springs, the highway has a concurrency with US 20 for 0.5 miles (0.8 km). North of US 20, the highway exits Otsego County.

=== Herkimer and Oneida counties ===
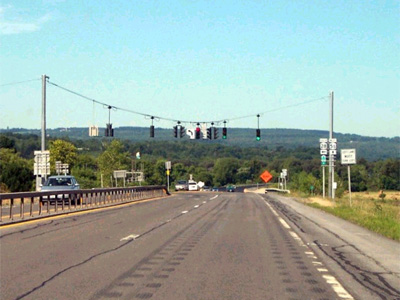
NY 28 at the intersection of NY 5S

In German Flatts, NY 28 becomes Columbia Street and intersects the western terminus of NY 168. In Mohawk, NY 28 intersects and has a brief overlap with NY 5S. After crossing the Mohawk River, NY 28 becomes Mohawk Street and meets I-90 (New York State Thruway) at exit 30. In the village of Herkimer, NY 28 has a concurrency with NY 5. North of NY 5, NY 28 begins to parallel the West Canada Creek. In Middleville, it intersects the western terminus of NY 29 and the northern terminus of NY 169. The highway executes a 90-degree turn at the three-route junction. NY 28 continues towards the north paralleling the West Canada Creek. In Poland, NY 28 begins a wrong-way concurrency with NY 8.

In Deerfield, Oneida County, NY 28 splits from NY 8. NY 28 crosses the West Canada Creek and leaves Oneida County for about 3 miles (5 km), then re-crosses the creek and enters Oneida County again. In Trenton, NY 28 joins NY 12 northward toward Barneveld. In Barneveld, NY 12 and NY 28 intersect NY 365. NY 28 splits from NY 12 in Remsen and heads toward the northeast, passing through numerous lakes and reservoirs. In Forestport, it enters Adirondack Park as it parallels the Adirondack Mountains.

NY 28 briefly reenters Herkimer County, but does not have any major junctions. NY 28 passes the Fulton Chain Lakes, among several other large lakes, as it winds through the Adirondack Park.

=== Hamilton and Warren counties ===
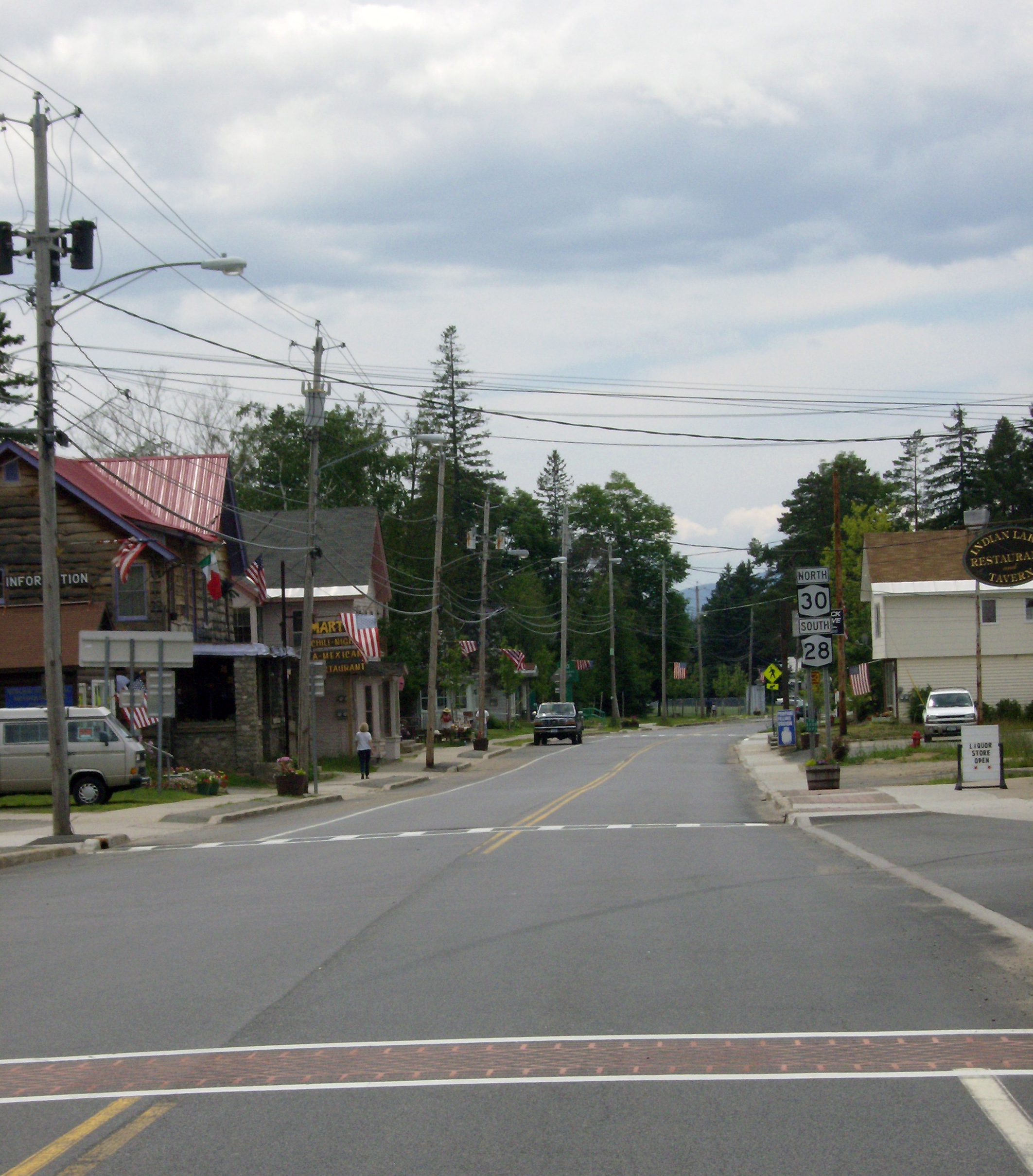
NY 28 and NY 30 in Indian Lake

The Fulton Chain Lakes which NY 28 has been following extend into Hamilton County. The highway soon reaches the settlement of Long Lake as it passes south of Raquette Lake. In the hamlet of Blue Mountain Lake, the route begins a wrong-way concurrency with NY 30; the concurrency ends in the hamlet of Indian Lake. East of NY 30, NY 28 begins to shift towards the south.

NY 28 enters Warren County paralleling the Hudson River. In North Creek, it intersects the eastern terminus of NY 28N. The highway continues towards the south opposite to its original course. In Wevertown, it intersects NY 8. It continues towards the southeast paralleling the Hudson River and in Warrensburg, NY 28 comes to an end at a "Y" intersection with US 9.

== History ==
=== Ulster and Delaware Turnpike ===
In 1802, the Ulster and Delaware Turnpike was chartered by the New York State Legislature "for improving and making a road from the west line of the Town of Salisbury in the State of Connecticut to the Susquehanna River at or near the Town of Jericho (now Bainbridge)". The portion of the Ulster and Delaware Turnpike east of the Hudson River was also commonly known as the Ulster and Salisbury Turnpike or the Salisbury Turnpike. West of the river, the turnpike connected Kingston to modern-day Bainbridge. At that time it followed modern NY 28 west from Kingston up to the Delaware County hamlet of Andes. From Andes, the turnpike alignment left NY 28 to follow modern CR 2 to De Lancey, NY 10 to Walton, and NY 206 to the Village of Bainbridge. The turnpike crossed the river via the Kingston-Rhinecliff Ferry and used modern Rhinecliff Road and West Market Street to the village center of Rhinecliff, then roughly followed modern-day NY 308 to the hamlet of Eighmyville. It continued east from there using part of present-day CR 52 to eventually connect with and follow the route of current NY 199. The turnpike corporation operated through the late 19th century.

=== Designation ===
NY 28 was designated in 1924, by the New York State Department of Transportation from Colliersville (near Oneonta) north to Utica. At the time, NY 28 began at then-NY 9 in Colliersville and headed north on its current alignment to Cooperstown. NY 28 separated from its modern routing and continued to Springfield north of Cooperstown on what is now NY 80. Between Springfield and Richfield Springs, the highway utilized what is now US 20. At Richfield Springs, the highway turned north onto modern NY 167 and followed the current alignments of NY 167 and NY 168 to the village of Mohawk. Here, the highway turned westward, using a small portion of its current alignment and the present-day NY 5S corridor to connect to Utica by way of Ilion.

In 1924, what is now NY 28 was part of NY 19 from Kingston to Margaretville (where NY 19 turned north to follow modern NY 30 to Grand Gorge), NY 9 from Oneonta to Colliersville, NY 28 from Colliersville to Cooperstown, NY 2 from Trenton to Forestport, and NY 10 from North Creek to Wevertown. The remaining portions of modern NY 28 were unnumbered. By 1926, the portion of current NY 28 from Margaretville to Meredith was designated as part of NY 64. Past Meredith, NY 64 continued north to NY 23 on Palmerville Road, McDougal Road, Rathbun Road, and Prosser Hollow Road. Additionally, the segment of modern NY 28 from Middleville to Trenton was designated as part of NY 29. Between 1926 and 1930, what is now NY 28 between Blue Mountain Lake and North Creek became part of NY 10A, a highway extending from Long Lake to North Creek via Blue Mountain Lake.

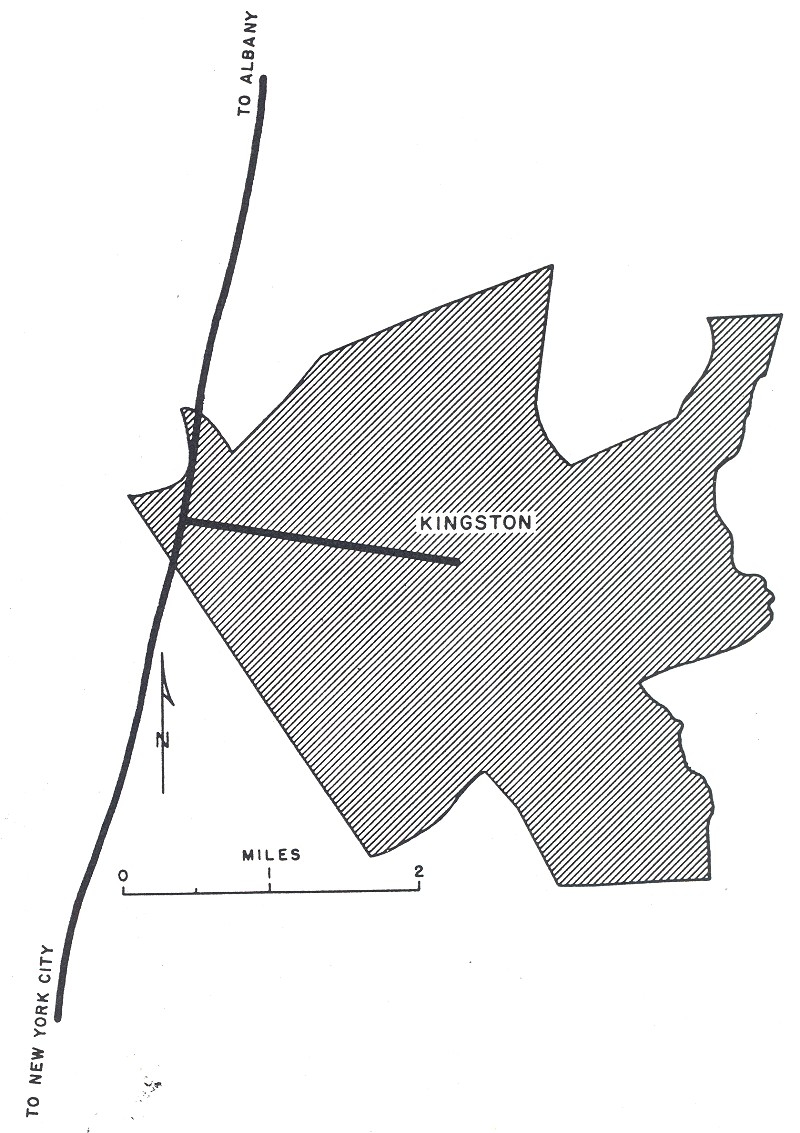
1955 Yellow Book map of Kingston loosely depicting what became I-587 (NY 28)

In the 1930 renumbering, NY 28 was extended south from Colliersville to Kingston largely by way of its current alignment along the Ulster and Delaware Turnpike. North of Cooperstown, the route was realigned to follow its modern routing between Cooperstown and Mohawk, then extended into the North Country through Wevertown to Warrensburg along its present alignment. Between Colliersville and Cooperstown, the route remained unchanged. The small portion of NY 10A that did not become part of NY 28 in the renumbering was incorporated into NY 10.

=== Realignments ===
In Oneida County, NY 28 originally broke from its modern alignment southeast of Barneveld to follow modern CR 56 into the village. At Mappa Avenue, then carrying NY 12, NY 28 turned north, overlapping NY 12 north along Mappa Avenue through the village. Outside of Barneveld, NY 12 and NY 28 were routed on Plank Road and what is now CR 82 before rejoining their modern alignment near the Remsen community of East Steuben. NY 28 was rerouted slightly c. 1940 to enter Barneveld via an extension of Trenton Falls Road and Mappa Avenue. Both NY 12 and NY 28 were realigned onto a new four-lane roadway from Barneveld to East Steuben in the 1950s.

Interstate 587
- Location: Kingston
- Length: 1.21 mi (1.95 km)
- Existed: July 1960–present

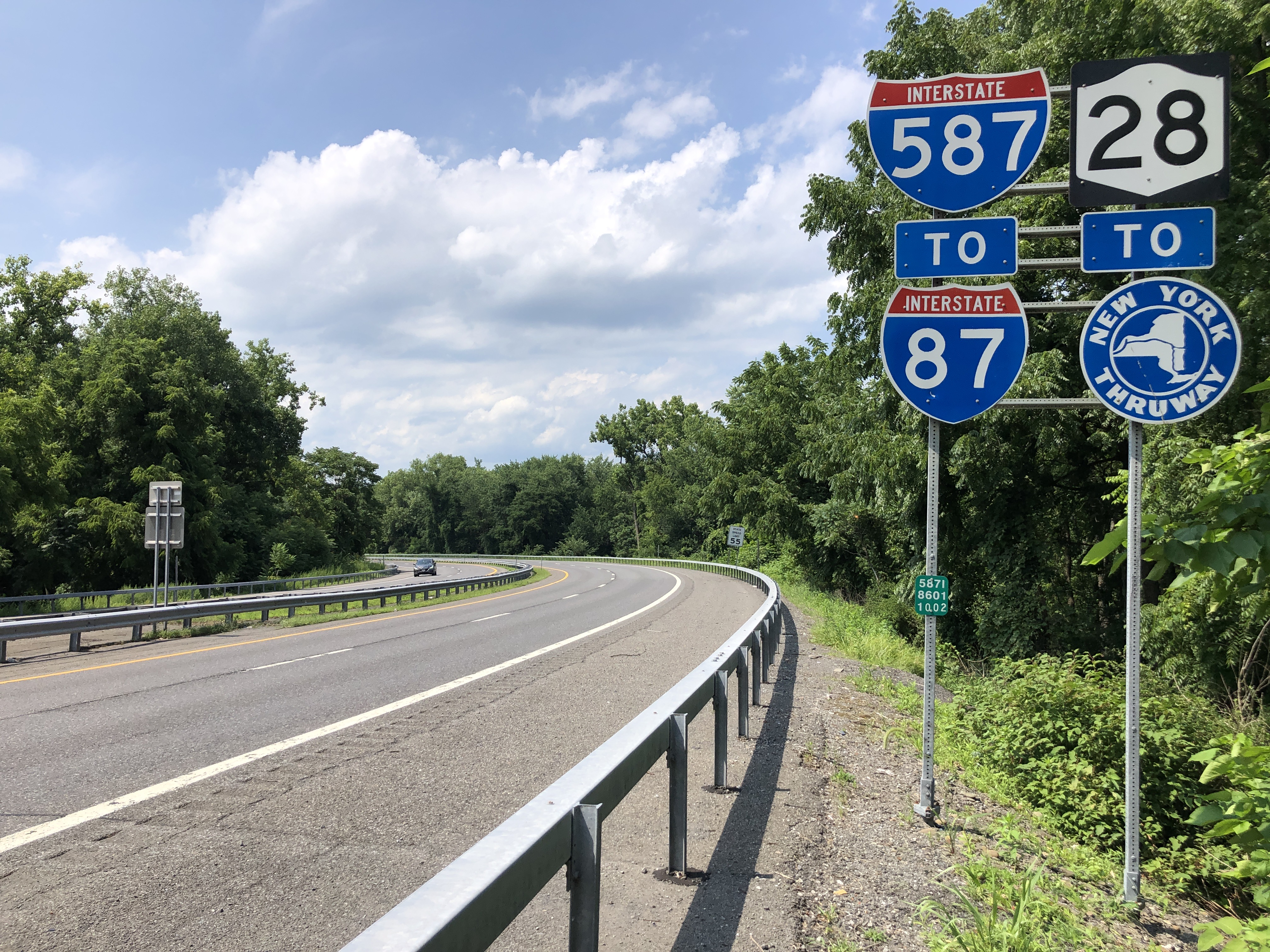
I-587/NY 28 westbound past NY 32 in Kingston

Within Kingston, NY 28 initially began at the intersection of Broadway and East Chester Street, which was part of US 9W at the time. From there, NY 28 followed Broadway, Albany and Clinton avenues, North Front Street, and Washington Avenue through the city to Ulster, where it joined its modern routing at what is now the roundabout leading to New York State Thruway exit 19. When the initial plans for the Interstate Highway System were outlined by the Bureau of Public Roads in the 1955 Yellow Book, a highway was planned for the NY 28 corridor. This highway was included as part of the 1,500-mile (2,414 km) expansion to the system in 1957. Construction began on the roadway, which became Colonel Chandler Drive, in December 1958. It was designated as I-587 and became part of a rerouted NY 28 upon its completion in July 1960. NY 28 continued to extend eastward from Colonel Chandler Drive along Broadway to US 9W until its truncation to NY 32 in the early 1980s. Washington Avenue, bypassed by the new freeway, is now designated as NY 981K, an unsigned reference route 0.41 miles (0.66 km) in length, from Hurley Avenue to NY 28.

In the vicinity of Oneonta, NY 28 originally crossed the Susquehanna River by way of Main Street. The route followed Main Street through the city to Colliersville, where it turned north onto D.K. Lifgren Drive to rejoin its modern alignment. From downtown Oneonta to Colliersville, NY 28 overlapped NY 7. NY 28 was rerouted to follow its current alignment between Main Street south of Oneonta and D.K. Lifgren Drive near Colliersville in the early 1980s, following the completion of what is now NY 28 from I-88 exit 17 to D.K. Lifgren Drive. The portion of Main Street between NY 28 and NY 7 (0.67 miles or 1.08 kilometres long) is now designated as NY 992D while D.K. Lifgren Drive (0.50 miles or 0.80 kilometres in length) is now NY 992G.

In Herkimer, NY 28 originally continued on Mohawk Street past South Caroline Street. The route then turned north onto Prospect Street and continued across modern NY 5 to West German Street where it met NY 5. NY 28 then turned west and began to overlap NY 5. Two blocks later, NY 5 turned south onto North Washington Street, and NY 28 continued along German Street for .4 miles (0.64 km) before meeting its modern alignment. By 1978, a new alignment of NY 5 was built through Herkimer, and NY 28 had been placed on its modern alignment. Farther north at Kast Bridge, NY 28 crossed West Canada Creek via modern CR 7 (West End Road) then crossed the creek once again and met its modern alignment. Between 1967 and 1978, the creek was straightened and NY 28 was realigned along the west bank, which eliminated the two crossings.

=== Memorial designation ===
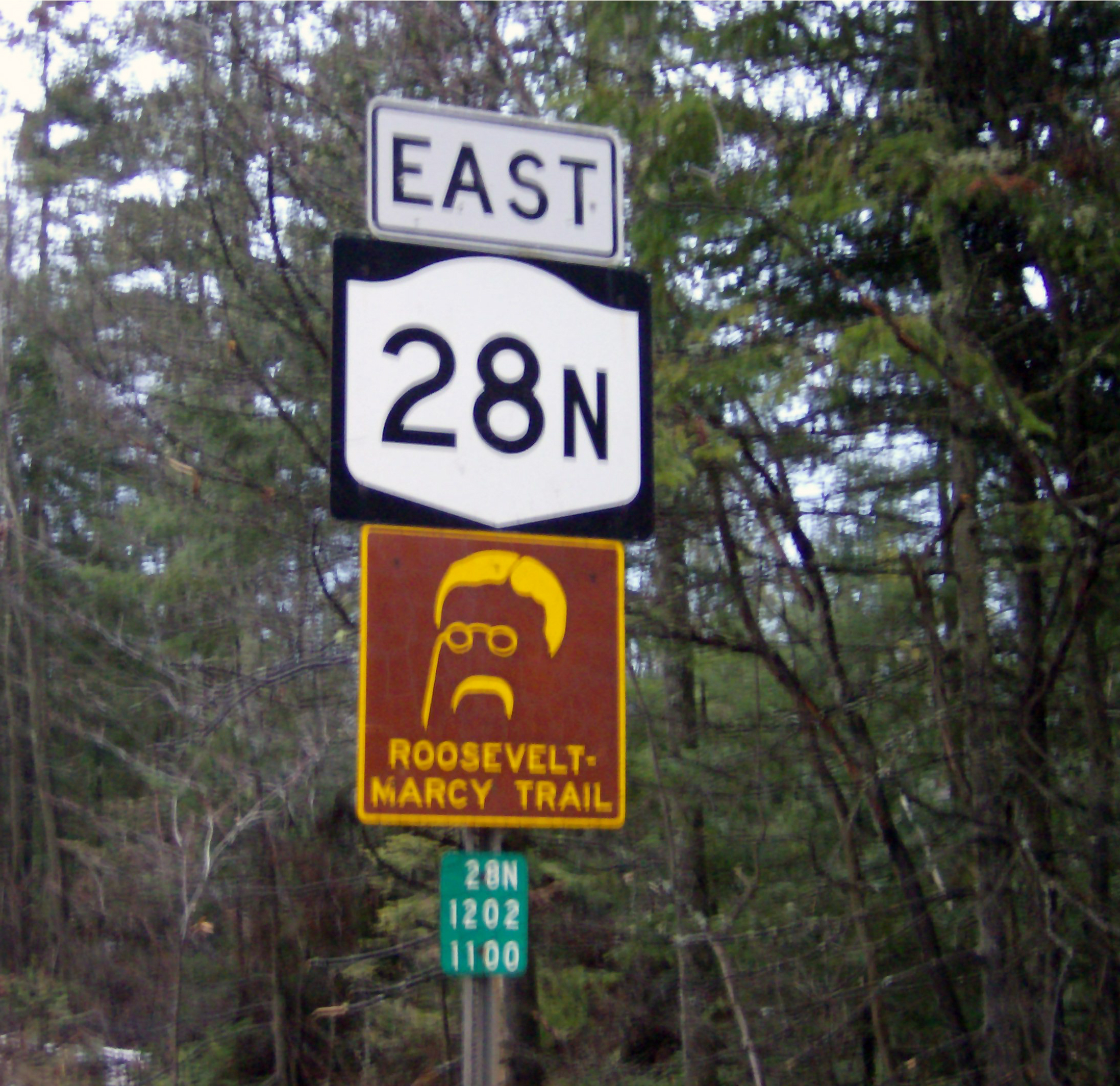
NY 28N sign with Roosevelt-Marcy Trail sign

On June 14, 2004, Governor George E. Pataki announced that a 1-mile (1.6 km) portion of the highway in the Town of Hurley in Ulster County was to be designated as the "New York State Troopers T. Michael Kelly and Kenneth A. Poorman Memorial Highway". During May 2000, troopers Kelly and Poorman were killed on this stretch of NY 28, when their police cruiser was struck by a tractor-trailer.

== Major intersections ==
County	Location	mi	km	Exit	Destinations	Notes
Ulster	City of Kingston	0.00	0.00		NY 32 (Broadway / Albany Avenue) I-587 begins	Roundabout; southern terminus; eastern terminus of I-587
Ulster	Ulster	1.21	1.95	Northern end of freeway section		
Ulster	Ulster	1.21	1.95		I-87 Toll / New York Thruway / Washington Avenue (NY 981K south) – New York, Albany, Kingston I-587 ends	Roundabout; western terminus of I-587; exit 19 on I-87 / Thruway
Ulster	Ulster	1.82	2.93		US 209 – Ellenville, Rhinecliff Bridge	Cloverleaf interchange
Ulster	Town of Kingston	4.31	6.94		NY 28A west	Eastern terminus of NY 28A
Ulster	Hurley	7.22	11.62		NY 375 north – Woodstock	Southern terminus of NY 375; hamlet of West Hurley
Ulster	Olive	13.39	21.55		Reservoir Road (NY 981L south) – Olivebridge	Hamlet of Shokan
Ulster	Olive	17.55	28.24		NY 28A east	Western terminus of NY 28A; hamlet of Boiceville
Ulster	Shandaken	20.06	32.28		NY 212 north	Southern terminus of NY 212; hamlet of Mount Tremper
Ulster	Shandaken	23.92	38.50		NY 214 north – Phoenicia, Chichester	Southern terminus of NY 214; hamlet of Phoenicia
Ulster	Shandaken	28.95	46.59		NY 42 north – Lexington	Southern terminus of NY 42; hamlet of Shandaken
Delaware	Margaretville	44.40	71.45		NY 30 north (Bridge Street) – Margaretville, Roxbury	Southern end of NY 30 concurrency
Delaware	Middletown	47.88	77.06		NY 30 south – Downsville	Northern end of NY 30 concurrency
Delaware	Village of Delhi	68.28	109.89		NY 10 south (Main Street) – Walton, SUNY-Delhi	Southern end of NY 10 concurrency
Delaware	Village of Delhi	68.56	110.34		NY 10 north (Main Street) – Stamford	Northern end of NY 10 concurrency
Delaware	Franklin	83.61	134.56		NY 357 west	Eastern terminus of NY 357; roundabout; hamlet of North Franklin
Otsego	Town of Oneonta	88.97	143.18		To I-88 west – Oneonta, Binghamton	Access via NY 992D
Otsego	Town of Oneonta	89.21	143.57		NY 23 east – Stamford	Southern end of NY 23 concurrency
Otsego	City of Oneonta	89.39	143.86	Southern end of freeway section		
Otsego	City of Oneonta	89.39	143.86	56	I-88 west / NY 23 west – Binghamton, Oneonta	Northern end of NY 23 concurrency; southern end of I-88 concurrency
Otsego	Town of Oneonta	91.41	147.11	58	CR 47 – Emmons, Davenport Center	
Otsego	Town of Milford	93.99	151.26	61	I-88 east / Gersoni Road (NY 991T south) – Albany	Northern end of I-88 concurrency
Otsego	Town of Milford	93.99	151.26	Northern end of freeway section		
Otsego	Town of Milford	95.75	154.09		To NY 7 – Colliersville	Access via NY 992G
Otsego	Village of Milford	103.47	166.52		NY 166 north (East Main Street) – Cherry Valley, Cooperstown-Westville Airport	Southern terminus of NY 166
Otsego	Cooperstown	111.99	180.23		NY 80 east (Chestnut Street)	Southern end of NY 80 concurrency
Otsego	Otsego	117.26	188.71		NY 80 west / NY 205 south – Hartwick	Northern end of NY 80 concurrency; northern terminus of NY 205
Otsego	Richfield Springs	126.36	203.36		US 20 east (Main Street) – Cherry Valley	Southern end of US 20 concurrency
Otsego	Town of Richfield	126.82	204.10		US 20 west / CR 25A south – West Winfield	Northern end of US 20 concurrency; northern terminus of CR 25A
Herkimer	Mohawk	137.29	220.95		NY 168 east (Hammond Street) – Paines Hollow	Western terminus of NY 168
Herkimer	Mohawk	138.14	222.31		NY 5S west – Ilion	Southern end of NY 5S concurrency
Herkimer	Mohawk	138.59	223.04		NY 5S east / East Main Street – Fort Plain	Northern end of NY 5S concurrency
Herkimer	Village of Herkimer	138.83	223.43		I-90 Toll / New York Thruway – Buffalo, Albany	Exit 30 on I-90 / Thruway
Herkimer	Village of Herkimer	139.22	224.05		NY 5 west – Utica, HCCC	Southern end of NY 5 concurrency
Herkimer	Village of Herkimer	139.71	224.84		South Washington Street (NY 922B south)	Northern terminus of NY 922B
Herkimer	Village of Herkimer	139.91	225.16		NY 5 east (State Street) – Little Falls	Northern end of NY 5 concurrency
Herkimer	Middleville	148.04	238.25		NY 29 east / NY 169 south – Fairfield, Little Falls	Western terminus of NY 29; northern terminus of NY 169
Herkimer	Poland	155.46	250.19		NY 8 north (Cold Brook Street) – Speculator	Southern end of NY 8 concurrency
Oneida	Deerfield	157.63	253.68		NY 8 south – Utica	Northern end of NY 8 concurrency
Oneida	Trenton	163.60	263.29		NY 12 south – Utica	Southern end of NY 12 concurrency; hamlet of Mapledale
Oneida	Trenton	163.89	263.76		Mappa Avenue (NY 921D north)	Former NY 921; former routing of NY 12/NY 28; hamlet of Barneveld
Oneida	Trenton	165.31	266.04		NY 365 – Barneveld, Prospect, Rome, Hinckley	Partial cloverleaf interchange
Oneida	Village of Remsen	168.20	270.69		Steuben Street (NY 920V east) – Remsen	Former NY 28B
Oneida	Town of Boonville	175.03	281.68		NY 12 north – Boonville, Watertown	Northern end of NY 12 concurrency; interchange; hamlet of Alder Creek
Hamilton	Town of Indian Lake	237.07	381.53		NY 28N east / NY 30 north – Long Lake, Tupper Lake	Southern end of NY 30 concurrency; western terminus of NY 28N; hamlet of Blue Mountain Lake
Hamilton	Town of Indian Lake	248.27	399.55		NY 30 south – Sabael, Speculator	Northern end of NY 30 concurrency; hamlet of Indian Lake
Warren	Johnsburg	265.23	426.85		NY 28N west – North Creek Business District, Minerva, Newcomb	Eastern terminus of NY 28N; hamlet of North Creek
Warren	Johnsburg	270.98	436.10		NY 8 – Speculator, Chestertown	Hamlet of Wevertown
Warren	Town of Warrensburg	281.69	453.34		US 9 to I-87 – Warrensburg, Chestertown	Northern terminus
1.000 mi = 1.609 km; 1.000 km = 0.621 mi: Concurrency terminus; Electronic toll collection

== Suffixed routes ==
- NY 28A (19.82 miles or 31.90 kilometres) is an alternate route of NY 28 along the southern edge of the Ashokan Reservoir in Ulster County. It was assigned c. 1933.
- NY 28B was a spur route connecting NY 28 in Remsen to Prospect in Oneida County. When the route was initially assigned c. 1936, it began at NY 12 and NY 28 in Barneveld and overlapped with then-NY 287 to Prospect, from where NY 28B continued northwest to NY 12 and NY 28 in Remsen by way of Prospect Road. NY 28B was truncated to Prospect in the early 1950s and removed in the mid-1960s. It is now known as NY 920V, an unsigned reference route.
- NY 28N (50.95 miles or 82.00 kilometres) is a northerly alternate to NY 28 between Long Lake and North Creek in Adirondack Park. It was assigned as part of the 1930 renumbering of state highways in New York.

== See also ==
- New York State Bicycle Route 28
