= Centerville, Ulster County, New York =

Village in New York, United States

Centerville is a small community in the Town of Saugerties, Ulster County, New York, United States. Centerville is located along New York State Route 212, approximately 2 mi (3.2 km) west of Interstate 87, and several miles east of Catskill State Park. The community is located at 42°08′42″N 74°01′31″W.
