= Mount Tremper, New York =

Human settlement in New York, United States

Mount Tremper is a hamlet in the Town of Shandaken in Ulster County, New York, United States. Mount Tremper is situated to the east of New York State Route 28 and to the north of New York State Route 212, within the Catskill Park. The community is located at 42°02′41″N 74°16′32″W. It is named for nearby Mount Tremper.
