= Bearsville, New York =

Bearsville
- Unincorporated community
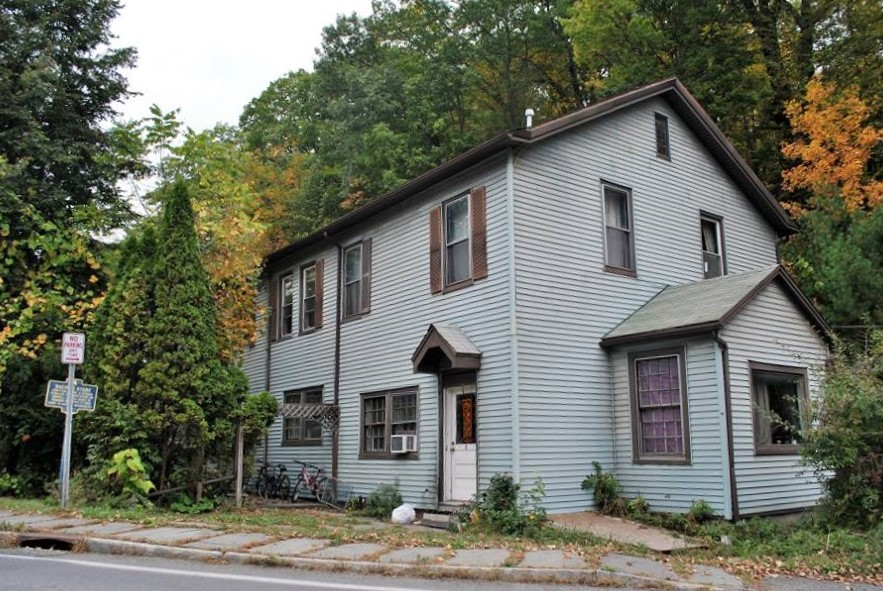
- Baehr's Store, for which Bearsville was named

- Location within the state of New York
- Coordinates: 42°02′26.7″N 74°09′18.7″W
- Country: United States
- State: New York
- County: Ulster

Government part of town of Woodstock
  - Type: Unincorporated
- Elevation: 600 ft (180 m)

Population (2000)
  - Total: 700
- Time zone: UTC-5 (Eastern (EST))
  - Summer (DST): UTC-4 (EDT)
- ZIP codes: 12409
- Area code: 845
- GNIS feature ID: 943336

Bearsville is a hamlet in Ulster County, New York, United States, in the town of Woodstock. It is located along New York State Route 212, within Catskill State Park and just to the west of the hamlet of Woodstock.

Bearsville was named not for the numerous local black bears, but for German peddler and storekeeper Christian Baehr, who built a store on the Sawkill Creek in 1839.

Places of interest in Bearsville, or named for it, include Bearsville Records and Bearsville Studios, and The Bearsville Theater and restaurant complex.
