= Willow, New York =

- Hamlet
- Location within New York Location within the United States
- Coordinates: 42°04′35″N 74°13′41″W
- Country: United States
- State: New York
- County: Ulster
- Elevation: 1,093 ft (333 m)
- Time zone: UTC-5 (Eastern (EST))
  - Summer (DST): UTC-4 (EDT)
- ZIP code: 12495
- Area code: 845
- GNIS feature ID: 971334

Willow is a hamlet in Ulster County, New York, United States. The community is located along New York State Route 212, 9.6 miles (15.4 km) south-southwest of Tannersville. Willow has a post office with the ZIP code 12495, which opened on November 4, 1898.

== Notable person ==
Carla Bley, jazz musician, composer and bandleader
