= New York State Route 212 =

State highway in Ulster County, New York, US

New York State Route 212
- Map of the Northern Hudson Valley and Catskill Park with NY 212 highlighted in red

Route information
- Maintained by NYSDOT
- Length: 21.92 mi (35.28 km)
- Existed: 1930–present

Major junctions
- West end: NY 28 in Shandaken
- I-87 Toll / New York Thruway / NY 32 / CR 31 in Saugerties town
- East end: US 9W / NY 32 in Saugerties village

Location
- Country: United States
- State: New York
- Counties: Ulster

Highway system
- New York Highways; Interstate; US; State; Reference; Parkways
← NY 211	→ NY 213

New York State Route 212 (NY 212) is an east–west state highway located entirely within Ulster County, New York, in the United States. It runs for 21.92 miles (35.28 km) from an intersection with NY 28 in the interior of the Catskill Park to a junction with U.S. Route 9W (US 9W) and NY 32 on the west bank of the Hudson River, providing a key interchange with the New York State Thruway (Interstate 87 or I-87) along the way. The mostly rural two-lane route serves the communities of Woodstock and Saugerties while passing Cooper Lake, Kingston's reservoir. NY 212 was assigned as part of the 1930 renumbering of state highways in New York.

== Route description ==
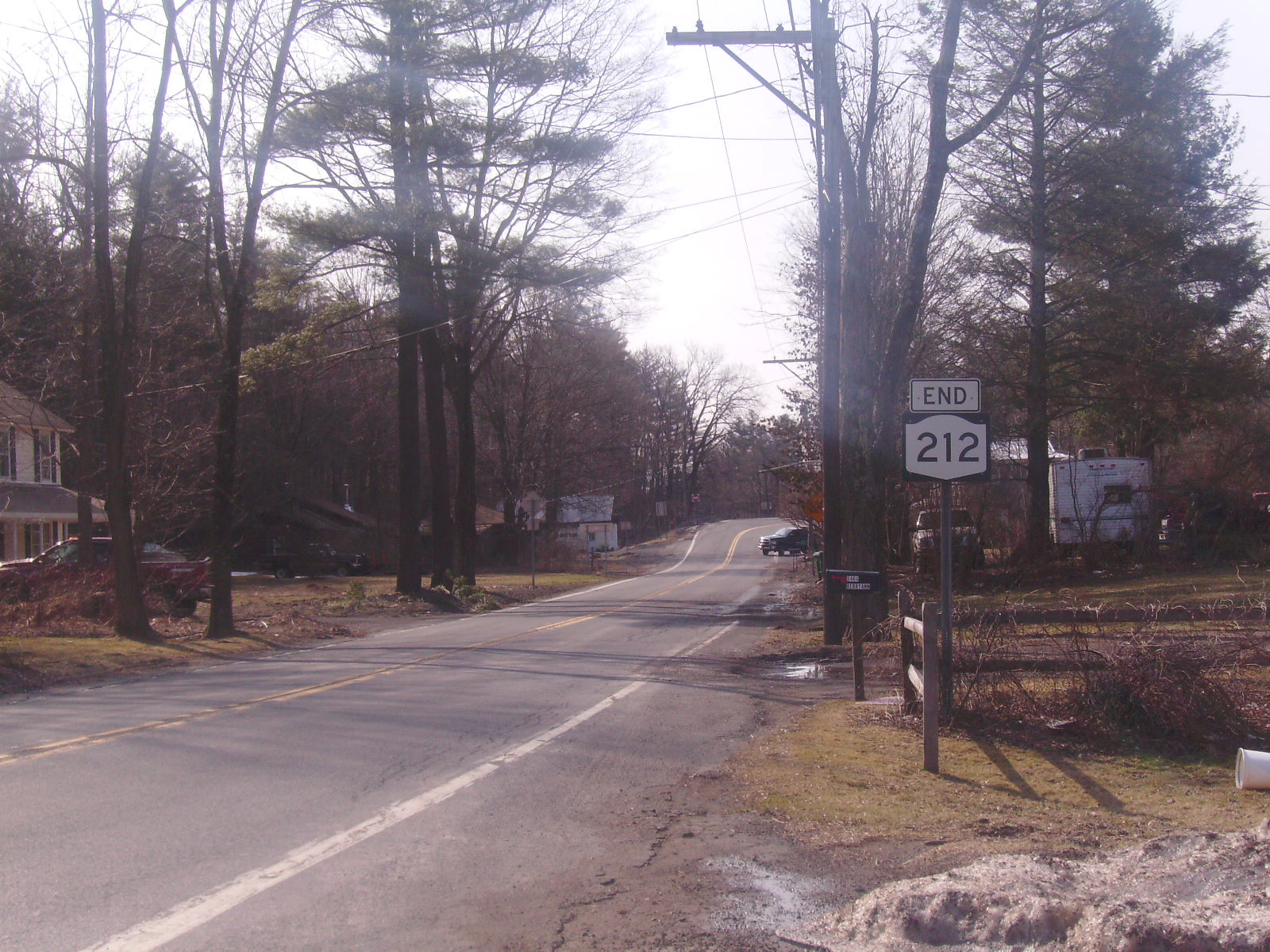
Signage denoting the western terminus of NY 212 at NY 28 in Mount Tremper

NY 212 begins at an intersection with NY 28 on the banks of Esopus Creek in the town of Shandaken. The two-lane route initially runs north along the creek, serving the hamlet of Mount Tremper before curving northeast into a narrow, wooded valley surrounding Beaver Kill, a tributary of Esopus Creek. While inside the gully, the highway winds its way along the southeastern base of Mount Tremper itself, crossing into the town of Woodstock in the process. The valley widens slightly at the small hamlet of Willow, where NY 212 and Beaver Kill both make a turn to the southeast. Not far from Willow, Beaver Kill reaches its source at a point west of Cooper Lake, the main reservoir for the city of Kingston 11 miles (18 km) to the southeast. Past the lake, NY 212 picks up the Saw Kill, another tributary of the Esopus, as it heads through a small, isolated community named Shady.

From Shady, NY 212 runs southward along the Saw Kill, intersecting County Route 33 (CR 33, named Glasco Turnpike) on its way into the hamlet of Bearsville. Here, the highway makes a pronounced turn to the east at a junction with CR 45 (Wittenberg Road) in the center of the community. The change in direction carries NY 212 into the adjacent, much larger hamlet of Woodstock, where the route gains the name Tinker Street. In Woodstock, the road runs past a handful of residential blocks before meeting CR 41 (Tannery Brook Road) on the western edge of the community's commercial center. After another block, NY 212 curves east onto Mill Hill Road, which brings the route southeastward through the rest of the central business district. The line of businesses eventually comes to an end at an intersection with NY 375 (West Hurley Road).

As the route heads away from NY 375, it winds its way northeastward out of the hamlet, paralleling the Saw Kill through another wooded area to a junction with CR 30 (Zena Road). At this point, the Saw Kill bends southward along CR 30 while NY 212 continues northeast across the Blue Line delimiting the eastern boundary of Catskill Park and the Woodstock–Saugerties town line. Outside of the park, the route runs across mostly level terrain to the hamlet of Shulits Corners, where it meets CR 32 (Glasco Turnpike) amongst a cluster of homes in the center of the community. From here, NY 212 runs northeast past intermittent stretches of homes separated by dense forests for 4 miles (6.4 km) before curving eastward at an intersection with CR 35 (Blue Mountain Road) west of the hamlet of Veteran. The highway subsequently winds through Veteran on its way toward the Hudson River valley.

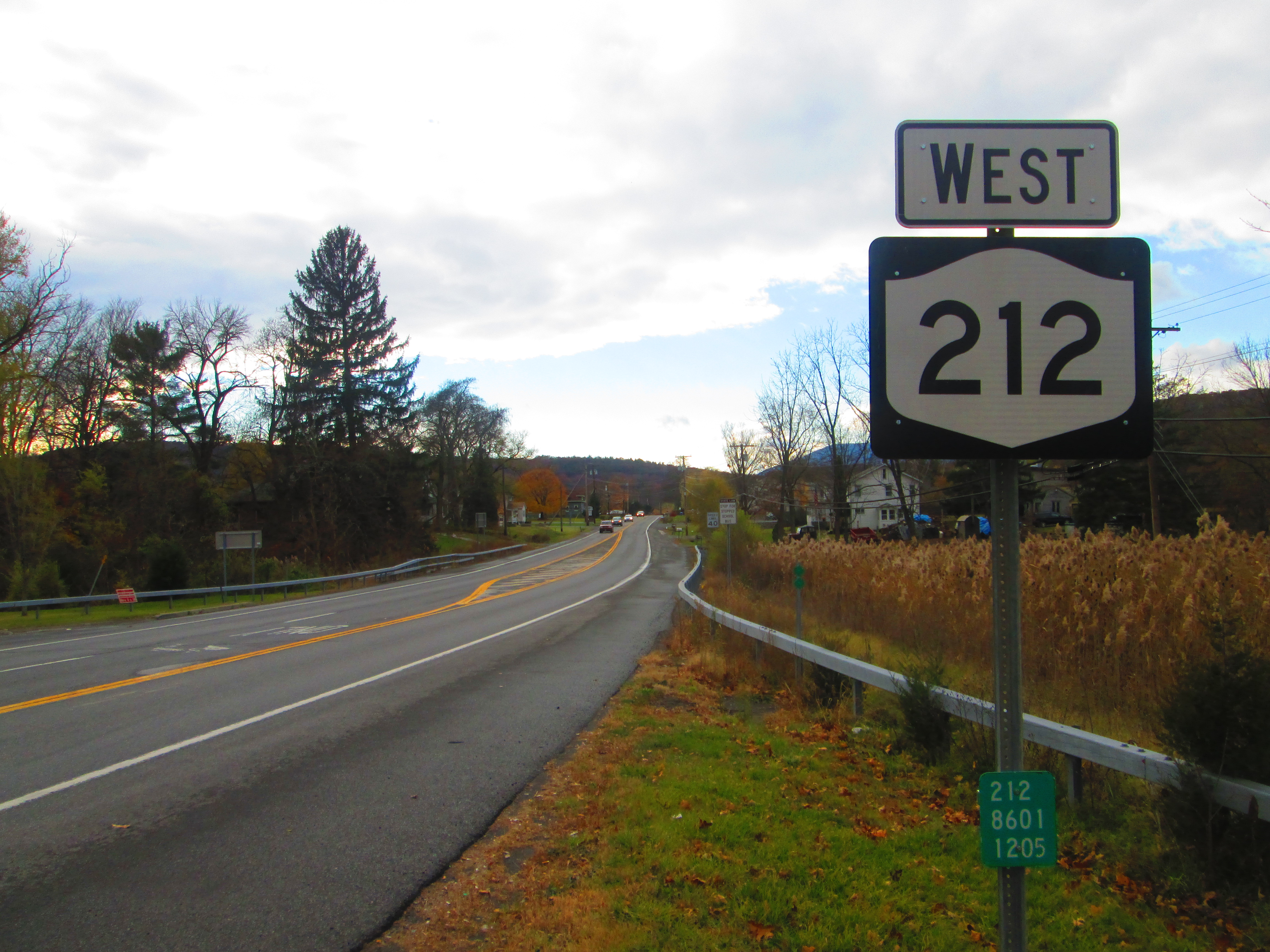
NY 212 westbound after the junction with NY 32 in the town of Saugerties

It soon reaches the outskirts of the village of Saugerties, where it connects to NY 32 at a junction adjacent to the New York State Thruway (I-87). NY 32 turns east here, overlapping with NY 212 as both routes pass over the Thruway and serve the southern half of an interchange (exit 20) with the toll road. Heading away from the Thruway, NY 32 and NY 212 trend southeastward, reaching a junction with the north end of CR 31 (Kings Highway) and crossing CSX Transportation's River Subdivision rail line on their way into the village limits. As Ulster Avenue, the highway passes several commercial blocks before intersecting Market Street near the center of Saugerties. At this point, the two routes head south for a block on Market Street and east for another block on Main Street to reach US 9W (Partition Street) in the village center. NY 212 ends here while NY 32 turns south to follow US 9W southbound on Partition Street. Northbound US 9W, meanwhile, continues northeast on Main Street toward the Hudson River.

== History ==
The modern-day alignment of NY 212 dates to 1828, when the state of New York passed a bill authorizing the construction of the Saugerties and Woodstock Turnpike Road Company. Passed on April 21, 1828, this new turnpike was to be constructed from the village of Saugerties at the store of Jeremiah Russell to Woodstock's Reformed Dutch Church. Provisions were made to extend the turnpike road to Shandaken and the house of Barnet Eighmey. This new road would be no wider than 50 feet (15 m) wide with a 20-foot (6.1 m) roadbed. If they chose to build a ditch, the roadbed would only need to be 15 feet (4.6 m). The company would erect at least one toll gate and provisions for more, which would rate at a cost relevant to every 10 miles (16 km) traveled. However, tollgates would not be allowed to be constructed within the village of Woodstock. On May 2, 1864, the state of New York approved the request of the company to construct a new toll gate on the right-of-way, located between Saugerties and the King's road (Ulster CR 31). The company would also discontinue the toll-gate located on the King's road.

Modern NY 212 was added to the New York state highway system in stages over the course of the early 20th century. The first segment was acquired by the state on July 9, 1902, and extended for 5 miles (8.0 km) from the Woodstock–Saugerties town line to CR 35 in Saugerties. An adjacent 4-mile (6.4 km) section was added on August 15 of that year, extending state maintenance of the road west to CR 45 in Woodstock. The portion of the highway east of CR 35 was added in two parts, the earliest of which became state-maintained on January 11, 1905, and extended from CR 35 to the Saugerties village limits. The section within the village was accepted into the state highway system 15 years later on July 30, 1920. State maintenance was extended northwest from CR 45 to Willow in the early to mid-1920s and southwest to Mount Tremper around the end of the decade. The Mount Tremper–Saugerties state highway did not have a posted route number until the 1930 renumbering of state highways in New York, when it was designated NY 212.

In 1930, a contract was let by the state to construct a brand new state highway connecting the hamlet of Willow to Mount Tremper. This new state highway would be 20-foot (6.1 m) wide, The contract was handed to Huie Construction Company of Saugerties, which began by clearing the right-of-way and grading through hills. Construction included the building of three new steel bridges and numerous concrete bridges and culverts. Construction of the road involved selecting from various locations, and the one selected was from an old farm in the Catskill Mountains. The new route was built with extra space on both sides for stuff such as a bridal path.

== Major intersections ==
The entire route is in Ulster County.

Location	mi	km	Destinations	Notes
Shandaken	0.00	0.00	NY 28 – Kingston, Phoenicia	Western terminus; hamlet of Mount Tremper
Town of Woodstock	12.09	19.46	NY 375 south (West Hurley Road) – West Hurley	Northern terminus of NY 375; hamlet of Woodstock
Town of Saugerties	20.58– 20.66	33.12– 33.25	I-87 Toll / New York Thruway / NY 32 north – New York City, Albany, Cairo, Hunter	Western end of NY 32 concurrency; exit 20 on I-87 / Thruway
Town of Saugerties	20.67	33.27	CR 31 south (Kings Highway) – Mount Marion	Northern terminus of CR 31
Village of Saugerties	21.92	35.28	US 9W (Main Street) / NY 32 south	Eastern terminus; eastern end of NY 32 concurrency
1.000 mi = 1.609 km; 1.000 km = 0.621 mi: Concurrency terminus; Tolled
