= Cottekill, New York =

- hamlet
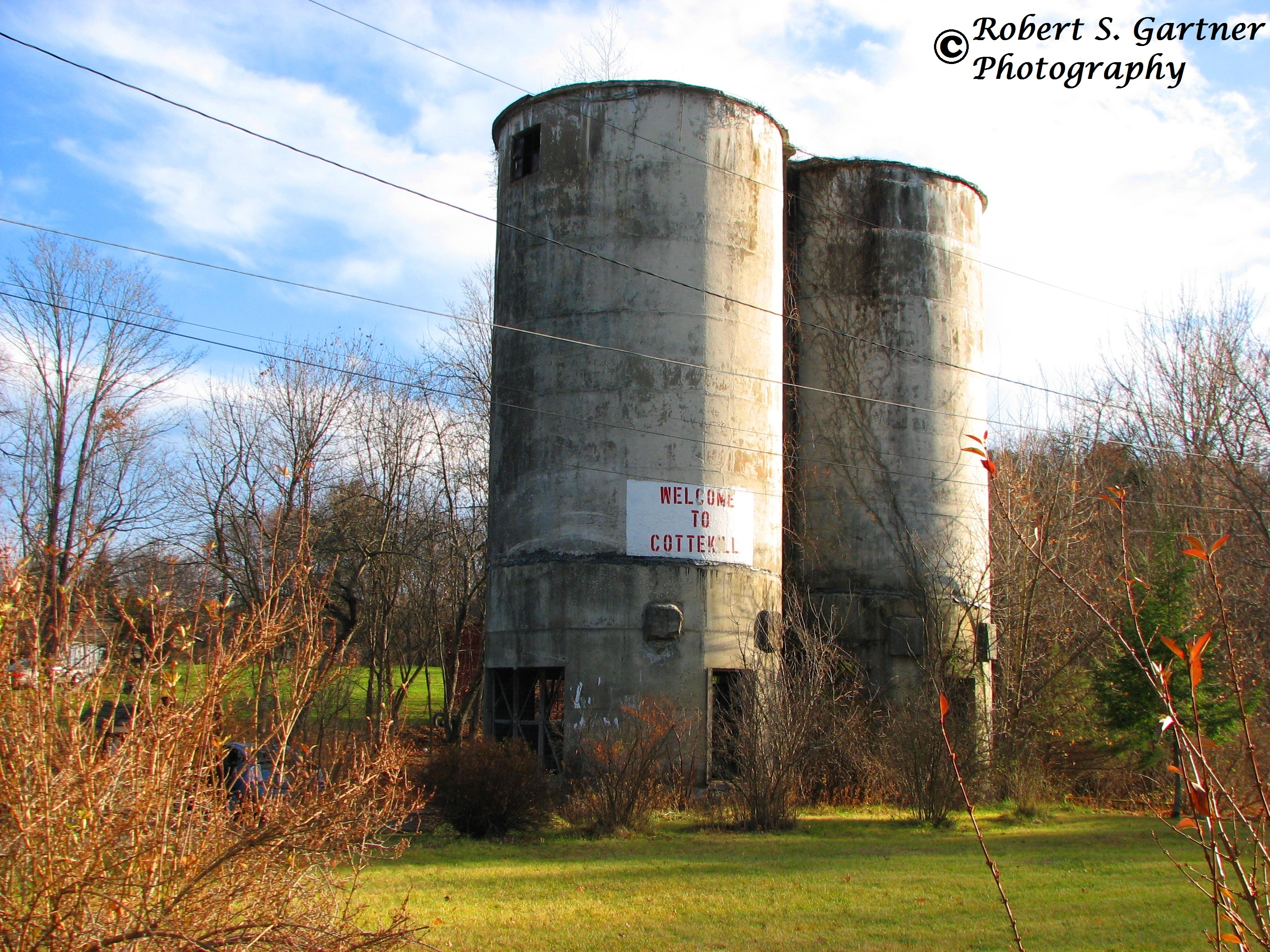

- Location within the state of New York
- Coordinates: 41°51′05″N 74°06′08″W
- Country: United States
- State: New York
- County: Ulster

Area
  - Total: 2.416 sq mi (6.26 km^{2})
  - Land: 2.395 sq mi (6.20 km^{2})
  - Water: 0.021 sq mi (0.054 km^{2})
- Elevation: 295 ft (90 m)

Population (2014)
  - Total: 451
  - Density: 188/sq mi (73/km^{2})
- Time zone: UTC-5 (Eastern (EST))
  - Summer (DST): UTC-4 (EDT)
- ZIP code: 12419
- Area code: 845

Cottekill is a small hamlet in the northwest part of Town of Rosendale, Ulster County, New York, United States. Located in the Rondout Valley, it is approximately 2.25 miles east of the hamlet of Stone Ridge, 2.5 miles northwest of Rosendale Village, 8.75 miles south of the city of Kingston and 10.9 miles north of the village of New Paltz. As of 2023, the population was listed at 660.

== Institutions and points of interest ==
Cottekill features a Post Office (12419) and has its own fire department, the Cottekill Volunteer Fire Company. The Brookside School, a private school for children with developmental disabilities is located in Cottekill.

The Sustainable Living Resource Center, a project of Sustainable Hudson Valley. SUNY Ulster, a community college, is nearby in Stone Ridge.

There is also the Marbletown-Rosendale Rail Trail, curving along the old New York, Ontario and Western Railway (O&W) tracks, paralleling Lucas Avenue. It starts at Leggett Road, crosses the Cottekill Creek on a wooden footbridge and travels north to Cottekill Road, past the Cottekill Fire House. It continues north from the firehouse, along the O&W path, crosses Marcott Road and comes out on Route 209.

== Demographics ==
- Median Age: 44.9 years
- Average Income: $119,268

== Climate ==
- January Avg Temp: 22 °F
- July Avg Temp: 72 °F
- Rainfall Avg (inches): 45
- Snowfall Avg (inches): 42

== Notable people ==
- Steve Hamilton - Detective novelist
- Marja Vallila (sculptor)
