= Wevertown, New York =

Wevertown
- Hamlet
- Nickname: Pipetown USA
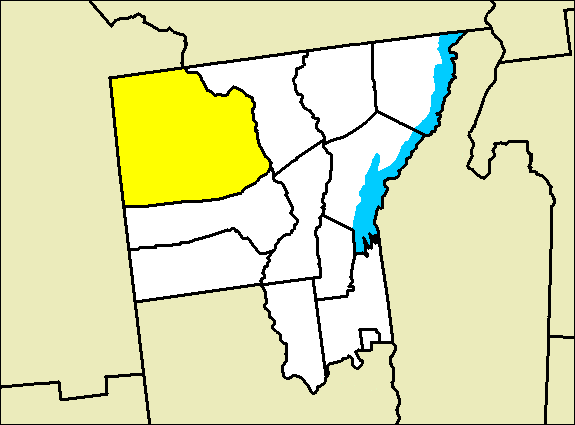
- Location of Johnsburg in Warren County

- Location within the state of New York
- Coordinates: 43°38′.25″N 73°56′27.57″W
- Country: United States
- State: New York
- County: Warren
- Elevation: 1,066 ft (325 m)
- Time zone: UTC-5 (Eastern (EST))
  - Summer (DST): UTC-4 (EDT)
- ZIP code(s): 12886
- Area code: 518
- North Creek U.S. Geological Survey Map

Wevertown is a hamlet in the Adirondack Mountains/Adirondack Park. It is in the town of Johnsburg in the northwestern corner of Warren County, New York, United States, and is part of the Glens Falls metropolitan area.

== Geography ==
The hamlet is northeast of Johnsburg hamlet on Route 8, approximately eight miles east of North Creek. The latitude of Wevertown is 43.633N. The longitude is -73.941W. The elevation is 1,066 feet. Wevertown appears on the North Creek United States Geological Survey (USGS) Map. Wevertown is part of the Upper Hudson Watershed—02020001. Nearby mountains include: Gore Mountain, McGann Mountain, Gage Mountain, Pine Mountain, Eleventh Mountain, and Pete Gay Mountain, Ethan Mountain, Henderson Mountain. Nearby lakes include Friends Lake and Loon Lake.

== History ==
Wevertown was founded by John Wever (1782-1870) and wife Mercy Barney Wever (1784-1865), who operated a sawmill. Wevertown was originally a tannery that opened in 1833, and called at times Nobles Corners. The first postmaster was appointed before 1850.
