= Ulster County, New York =

County in New York, United States

- County
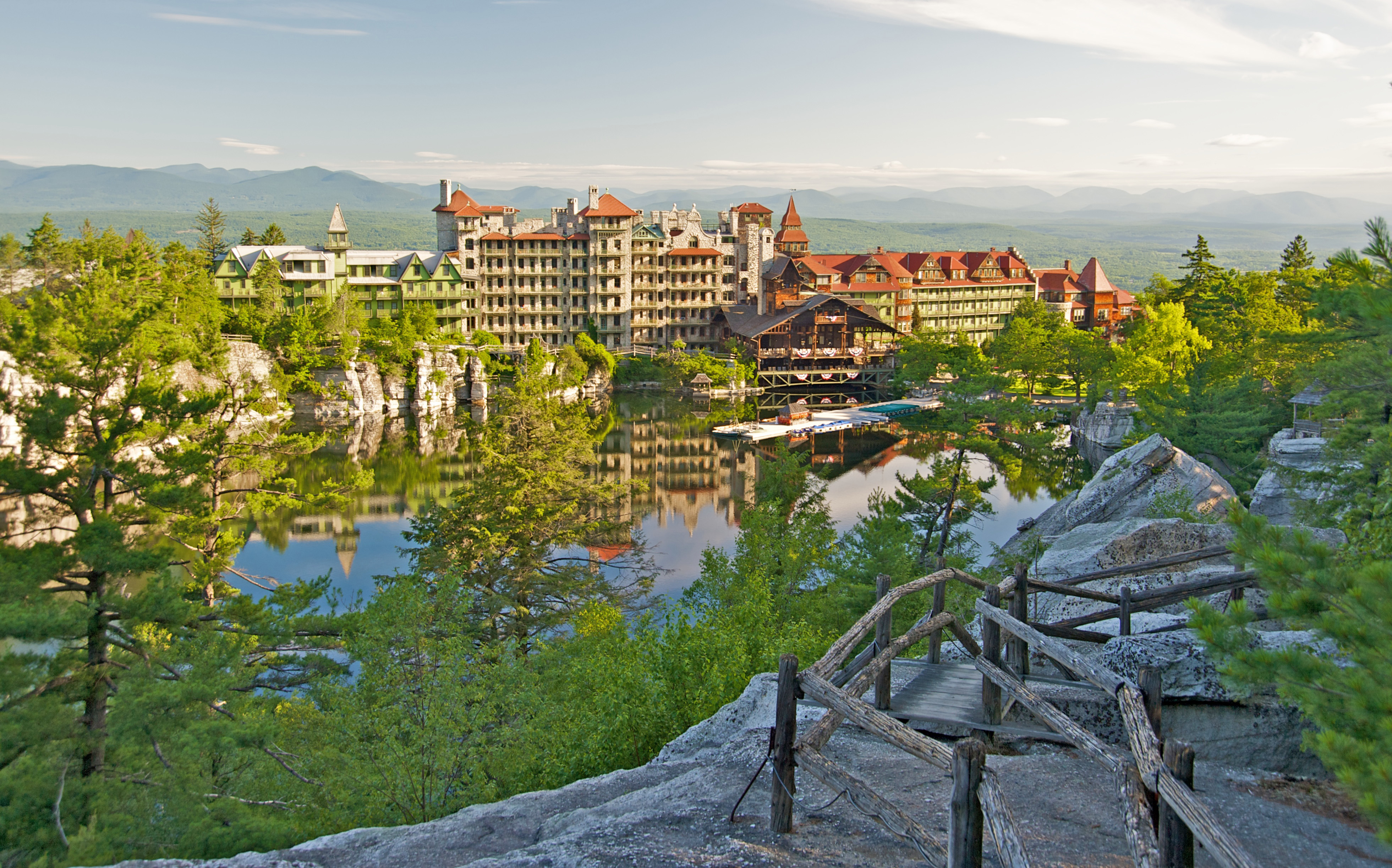
- Mohonk Mountain House on Shawangunk Ridge

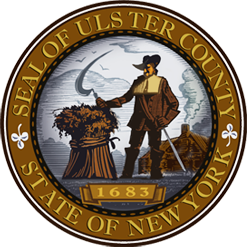
- Flag Seal

- Location within the U.S. state of New York
- Coordinates: 41°53′N 74°16′W
- Country: United States
- State: New York
- Founded: November 1, 1683; 343 years ago (Note: "The county is one of the original divisions of the State, erected November 1, 1683. Of its great territory it has given in the formation of Delaware in 1797, part of Greene in 1800, Sullivan in 1809, and a piece to Orange in the same year.")
- Named for: Prince James, Duke of York and Albany and Earl of Ulster
- Seat: Kingston
- Largest city: Kingston

Government
  - County Executive: Jen Metzger (D)

Area
  - Total: 1,161 sq mi (3,010 km^{2})
  - Land: 1,124 sq mi (2,910 km^{2})
  - Water: 37 sq mi (96 km^{2}) 3.1%

Population (2020)
  - Total: 181,851
  - Estimate (2025): 183,330 ▲
  - Density: 162.8/sq mi (62.9/km^{2})
- Time zone: UTC−5 (Eastern)
  - Summer (DST): UTC−4 (EDT)
- Congressional districts: 18th, 19th
- Website: www.ulstercountyny.gov

Ulster County is a county in the U.S. state of New York. It is situated along the Hudson River. As of the 2020 census, the population was 182,977. The county seat is Kingston. The county is named after the Irish province of Ulster. The county is part of the Hudson Valley region of the state.

== History ==
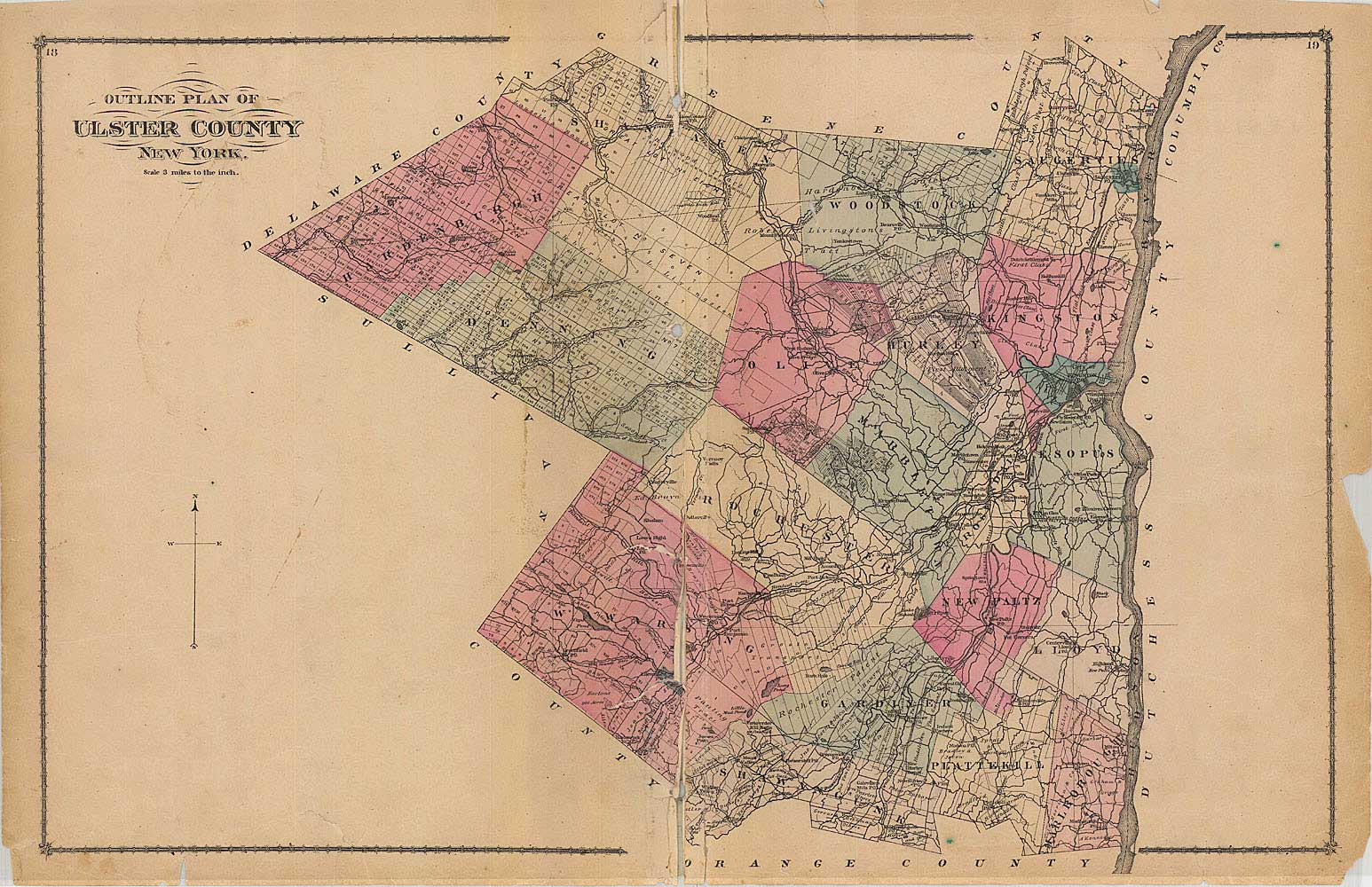
Ulster County in 1875

=== Founding and formation ===
When part of the New Netherland colony, Dutch traders first called the area of present-day Ulster County "Esopus", a name borrowed for convenience from a locality on the opposite side of the Hudson. "Esopus" meant "land of flowing water and high banks," or "small brook." There is also a town named Esopus located within Ulster County.

The local Lenape indigenous people called themselves Waranawanka, but soon came to be known to the Dutch as the "Esopus Indians" because they were encountered around the settlement known as Esopus. In 1652, Thomas Chambers, a freeholder from the Manor of Rensselaerswyck, purchased land at Esopus. He and several others actually settled and began farming by June 1653. The settlements grew into the village of Wiltwijck, which the English later named Kingston. In 1683, the Duke of York created 12 shires in his province, one of which was Ulster Shire, named after Prince James, Duke of York (later King James II of England) whose subsidiary titles included Earl of Ulster. Its boundaries at that time included the present Sullivan County and parts of the present Delaware, Orange, and Greene counties.

The Census of slaves, conducted in the Province of New York in 1755, lists numerous enslaved individuals throughout Ulster.

In 1777, the first state capital of the independent New York State was established at Kingston. The official records of Ulster County were removed to safety to a stone house in Kerhonkson when it became evident that the British would burn Kingston.

In 1797, parts of Otsego and Ulster counties were split off to create Delaware County.

In 1798, Ulster County's southernmost towns were moved into Orange County to compensate Orange for breaking away its southernmost part to form Rockland County.

In 1800, portions of Albany and Ulster counties were split off to create Greene County.

In 1809, Sullivan County was split off from Ulster County.

=== Civil War ===
During the American Civil War, volunteers were recruited from the county and formed the majority of the following regiments:

- 80th New York Volunteer Infantry Regiment
- 120th New York Volunteer Infantry
- 156th New York Volunteer Infantry

Other regiments with at least one company from the county included:

- 1st Battalion New York Volunteer Sharpshooters
- 1st New York Volunteer Engineer Regiment
- 7th Regiment New York Volunteer Cavalry
- 7th New York Veteran Infantry Regiment
- 15th Regiment New York Volunteer Cavalry
- 20th New York Volunteer Infantry Regiment
- 25th Regiment New York Volunteer Cavalry
- 25th New York Volunteer Infantry Regiment
- 56th New York Volunteer Infantry
- 65th New York Volunteer Infantry
- 71st New York Infantry
- 102nd New York Volunteer Infantry
- 132nd New York Volunteer Infantry Regiment
- 168th New York Volunteer Infantry
- 176th New York Volunteer Infantry
- 178th New York Volunteer Infantry Regiment
- 192nd New York Volunteer Infantry

=== Twentieth century ===
The Lake Mohonk Mountain House on Shawangunk Ridge was designated a National Historic Landmark in 1986.

== Geography ==
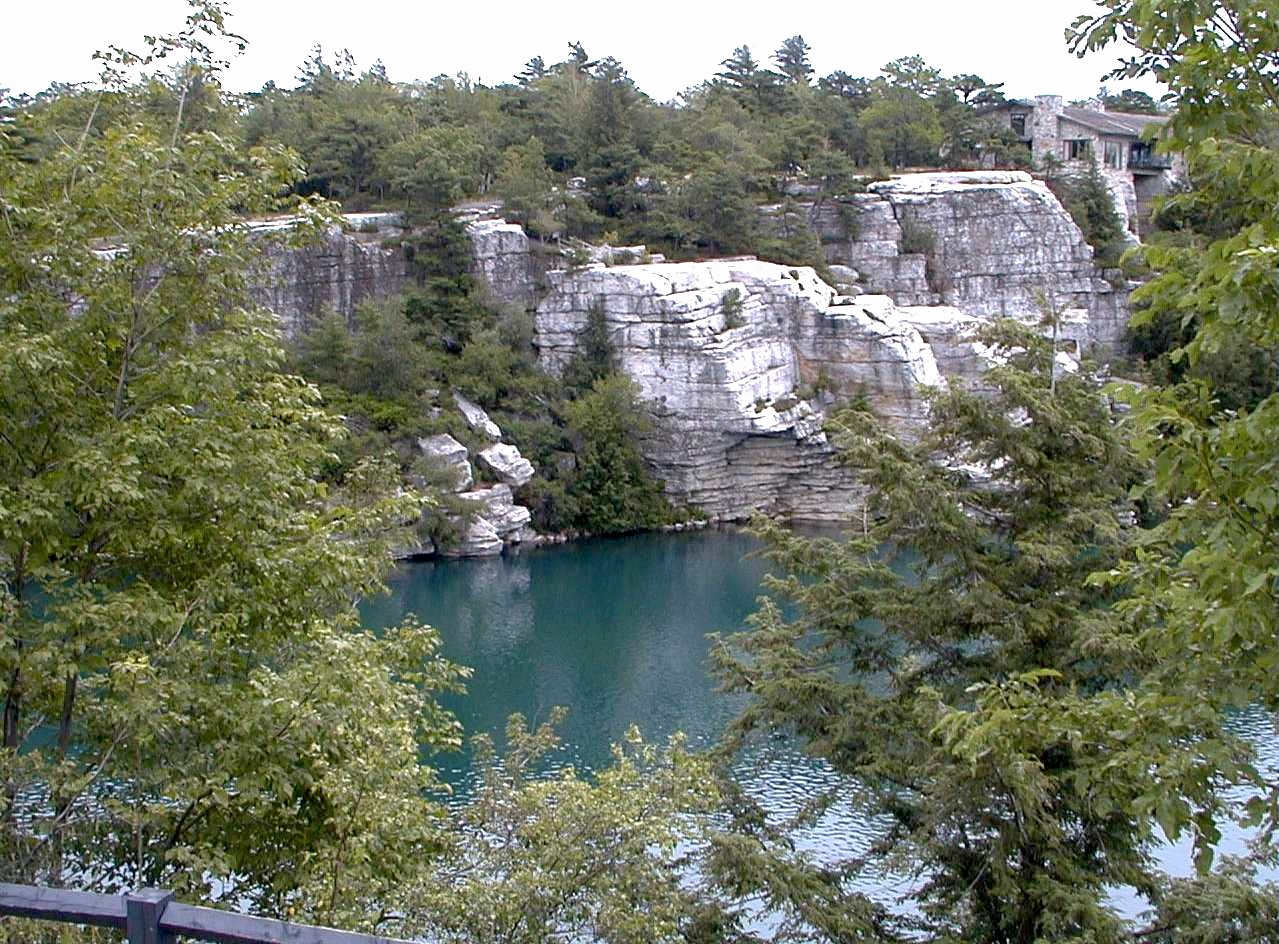
Lake Minnewaska

According to the U.S. Census Bureau, the county has an area of 1,161 square miles (3,010 km^{2}), of which 1,124 square miles (2,910 km^{2}) is land and 37 square miles (96 km^{2}) (3.1%) is water.

Ulster County is in southeastern New York State, south of Albany, immediately west of the Hudson River. Much of it is within the Catskill Mountains and the Shawangunk Ridge. Ulster County has Minnewaska State Park Preserve, Mohonk Preserve, Sundown State Park, VerNooykill State Forest, Witches Hole State Forest, and Shawangunk Ridge State Forest. The Sam's Point section of Minnewaska includes rare dwarf pine trees and Verkeerder Kill falls.

The county's highest point is Slide Mountain, at approximately 4,180 feet (1,270 m) above sea level. The lowest point is sea level along the Hudson River.

=== Adjacent counties ===
- Greene County — north
- Columbia County — northeast
- Dutchess County — southeast
- Orange County — south
- Sullivan County — southwest
- Delaware County — northwest

=== National protected area ===
- Shawangunk Grasslands National Wildlife Refuge

== Demographics ==
Historical population
Census	Pop.	Note	%±
1790	29,370		—
1800	24,855		−15.4%
1810	26,576		6.9%
1820	30,934		16.4%
1830	36,550		18.2%
1840	45,822		25.4%
1850	59,384		29.6%
1860	76,381		28.6%
1870	84,075		10.1%
1880	85,838		2.1%
1890	87,062		1.4%
1900	88,422		1.6%
1910	91,769		3.8%
1920	74,979		−18.3%
1930	80,155		6.9%
1940	87,017		8.6%
1950	92,621		6.4%
1960	118,804		28.3%
1970	141,241		18.9%
1980	158,158		12.0%
1990	165,304		4.5%
2000	177,749		7.5%
2010	182,493		2.7%
2020	182,977		0.3%
2025 (est.)	183,330	▲	0.2%
U.S. Decennial Census; 1790–1960 1900–1990; 1990–2000 2010–2020

=== 2020 census ===
Ulster County, New York – racial and ethnic composition Note: the US Census treats Hispanic/Latino as an ethnic category. This table excludes Latinos from the racial categories and assigns them to a separate category. Hispanics/Latinos may be of any race.
Race / ethnicity (NH = Non-Hispanic)	Pop 1980	Pop 1990	Pop 2000	Pop 2010	Pop 2020	% 1980	% 1990	% 2000	% 2010	% 2020
White alone (NH)	145,252	148,769	152,064	149,099	136,695	91.84%	90.00%	85.55%	81.70%	75.17%
Black or African American alone (NH)	6,268	7,198	9,044	9,982	10,152	3.96%	4.35%	5.09%	5.47%	5.58%
Native American or Alaska Native alone (NH)	280	440	359	414	306	0.18%	0.27%	0.20%	0.23%	0.17%
Asian alone (NH)	887	1,902	2,169	3,060	3,778	0.56%	1.15%	1.22%	1.68%	2.08%
Native Hawaiian or Pacific Islander alone (NH)	x	x	45	29	45	x	x	0.03%	0.02%	0.02%
Other race alone (NH)	540	163	390	344	1,218	0.34%	0.10%	0.22%	0.19%	0.67%
Mixed race or Multiracial (NH)	x	x	2,737	3,656	8,538	x	x	1.54%	2.00%	4.70%
Hispanic or Latino (any race)	4,931	6,832	10,941	15,909	21,119	3.12%	4.13%	6.16%	8.72%	11.61%
Total	158,158	165,304	177,749	182,493	181,851	100.00%	100.00%	100.00%	100.00%	100.00%

As of the 2020 census the population of Ulster County is 182,977. The population density was 158 inhabitants per square mile (61/km^{2}). The county's racial makeup, as of 2020, was 75.16% non-Hispanic white, 5.8% black or African American, 0.2% Native American, 2.1% Asian, 0.02% Pacific Islander, 5.4% from other races or from two or more races. 11.61% of the population were Hispanic or Latino of any race

=== 2010 census ===
As of the census of 2010, the county had 181,440 people, 67,499 households, and 43,536 families. The population density was 158 inhabitants per square mile (61/km^{2}). There were 77,656 housing units at an average density of 69 units per square mile (27/km^{2}). The county's racial makeup, as of 2008, was 83.2% white, 6.50% black or African American, 0.3% Native American, 1.7% Asian, 0.03% Pacific Islander, 2.15% from other races, and 1.70% from two or more races. 7.6% of the population were Hispanic or Latino of any race. 19.2% were of Italian, 16.8% Irish, 15.5% German, 6.8% English, and 4.7% American ancestry according to Census 2000. 90.3% spoke English, 4.5% Spanish, 1.2% Italian, and 1.0% German as their first language.

There were 67,499 households, of which 30.70% had children under age 18 living with them, 49.20% were married couples living together, 10.90% had a female householder with no husband present, and 35.50% were non-families. Of all households, 27.90% were made up of individuals, and 10.20% had someone living alone who was 65 years of age or older. The average household size was 2.47 and the average family size was 3.03.

23.5% of the county's population was under age 18, 8.70% was from age 18 to 24, 29.7% was from age 25 to 44, 24.70% was from age 45 to 64, and 13.30 was age 65 or older. The median age was 38 years. For every 100 females, there were 99.1 males. For every 100 females age 18 and over, there were 96.6 males.

The county's median household income was $42,551, and the median family income was $51,708. Males had a median income of $36,808 versus $27,086 for females. The per capita income for the county was $20,846. About 7.2% of families and 11.4% of the population were below the poverty line, including 13% of those under age 18 and 8.7% of those age 65 and over.

== Government and politics ==
United States presidential election results for Ulster County, New York
Year	Republican		Democratic		Third party(ies)	
Year	No.	%	No.	%	No.	%
1884	9,929	48.71%	9,870	48.42%	586	2.87%
1888	10,825	49.57%	10,487	48.02%	526	2.41%
1892	9,450	46.29%	9,808	48.04%	1,157	5.67%
1896	11,100	56.31%	8,140	41.30%	471	2.39%
1900	11,348	53.68%	9,349	44.22%	444	2.10%
1904	11,356	53.13%	9,516	44.52%	501	2.34%
1908	10,475	53.06%	8,560	43.36%	705	3.57%
1912	7,485	38.33%	8,510	43.58%	3,531	18.08%
1916	10,734	56.58%	7,807	41.15%	430	2.27%
1920	19,001	66.41%	8,759	30.61%	852	2.98%
1924	20,048	63.32%	9,361	29.57%	2,251	7.11%
1928	25,418	62.46%	14,200	34.89%	1,077	2.65%
1932	21,002	52.87%	18,092	45.55%	627	1.58%
1936	24,678	55.32%	19,118	42.85%	815	1.83%
1940	27,186	57.00%	20,403	42.78%	107	0.22%
1944	26,703	61.02%	16,943	38.72%	117	0.27%
1948	28,941	64.30%	14,441	32.08%	1,630	3.62%
1952	36,141	69.44%	15,733	30.23%	171	0.33%
1956	43,034	76.36%	13,321	23.64%	0	0.00%
1960	36,418	61.20%	23,017	38.68%	67	0.11%
1964	23,749	40.03%	35,486	59.82%	91	0.15%
1968	34,798	57.62%	20,886	34.59%	4,703	7.79%
1972	46,883	68.51%	21,371	31.23%	179	0.26%
1976	35,353	53.44%	30,190	45.64%	610	0.92%
1980	36,709	55.01%	22,179	33.24%	7,838	11.75%
1984	47,372	63.93%	26,445	35.69%	285	0.38%
1988	41,173	56.75%	30,744	42.37%	640	0.88%
1992	29,223	36.16%	32,886	40.69%	18,712	23.15%
1996	26,212	35.49%	35,852	48.55%	11,787	15.96%
2000	33,447	42.75%	38,162	48.78%	6,628	8.47%
2004	37,821	43.12%	47,602	54.27%	2,289	2.61%
2008	33,300	37.35%	54,320	60.93%	1,529	1.72%
2012	29,759	37.37%	47,752	59.97%	2,115	2.66%
2016	35,239	41.32%	44,597	52.29%	5,454	6.39%
2020	37,590	38.59%	57,970	59.51%	1,860	1.91%
2024	39,743	40.07%	57,974	58.46%	1,455	1.47%

For most of the 20th century, Ulster County voted for the Republican nominees for president. Republicans regularly got over 60% of the vote, the high point coming when Dwight D. Eisenhower won 76% in 1956. The Democratic nominee won only in 1912, when Theodore Roosevelt and his Progressive Party split the Republican vote and gave a plurality to Woodrow Wilson, and in 1964, when Lyndon B. Johnson won every county in New York and carried Ulster County by 19.8 percentage points.

More recently, Ulster County has voted Democratic. In 1992, 1996, and 2000, the party won a plurality, due to strong showings from third parties. In 2004, John Kerry defeated George W. Bush, 54%–43%; in 2008, Barack Obama defeated John McCain, 61%–37%; in 2012, Obama defeated Mitt Romney, 60%–37%; in 2016, Hillary Clinton defeated Donald Trump, 52%–41%; in 2020, Joe Biden defeated Trump, 60%–39%; and in 2024, Kamala Harris defeated Trump, 58%–40%.

As of 2025, Ulster County is divided between 2 United States House of Representatives districts. The more populated eastern half of the county is in New York's 18th congressional district, represented by Democrat Pat Ryan. The less populated western half of the county is in New York's 19th congressional district, represented by Democrat Josh Riley. Ulster County had no U.S. representative after Antonio Delgado resigned on May 25, 2022, to become lieutenant governor of New York. Ryan won a special election on August 23 against Marc Molinaro, and was sworn in on September 13. Ryan ran in the 18th congressional district in the 2022 general election after redistricting put most of Ulster County in that district. Ryan was narrowly reelected against New York Assembly member Colin Schmitt. Molinaro ran in the 19th district and narrowly defeated Riley, before narrowly losing to Riley in a rematch in 2024.

=== County government ===
For a long time, Ulster County had a county-scale version of a council-manager government, with the county legislature hiring a county administrator to handle executive functions. The chair of the legislature had a great deal of power and was accountable only to the voters of their own district. The only countywide elected officials were the county clerk, district attorney, and sheriff.

In 2006, voters approved the first-ever county charter, changing to an elected executive branch. Two years later, Michael P. Hein, the last appointed county administrator, became Ulster's first elected county executive. In early 2019, Hein resigned to accept Governor Andrew Cuomo's appointment as commissioner of the state Office of Temporary and Disability Assistance. Deputy County Executive Adele Reiter succeeded him as acting county executive until a special election was held in April 2019.

On April 30, 2019, Democrat Patrick K. Ryan was elected in a special election by a margin of 74%-26%. He was sworn in as Ulster County's second county executive on June 7, 2019. On September 9, 2022, Ryan stepped down as county executive after winning election to the United States House of Representatives, and Johanna Contreras was sworn in as an acting county executive.

Democrat Jen Metzger, a former New York State Senator, defeated Republican Jim Quigley in the 2022 election to replace Ryan. For the election, 14-year-old Hudson Rowan designed the Ulster County "I Voted" sticker, which went viral for its weird design. Metzger took office in 2023.

Ulster county executives
Name	Party	Term
Michael P. Hein	Democratic	January 1, 2009 – February 11, 2019
Adele Reiter	Democratic	February 11, 2019 – June 7, 2019 (acting)
Pat Ryan	Democratic	June 7, 2019 – September 9, 2022
Johanna Contreras	Democratic	September 9, 2022 – December 31, 2022 (acting)
Jen Metzger	Democratic	January 1, 2023 – present

Other countywide elected officials in Ulster County
Office	Name	Party	Term
County comptroller	March Gallagher	Democratic	January 1, 2020 – present
County sheriff	Juan Figueroa	Democratic	January 1, 2019 – present
District attorney	Emmanuel "Manny" Nneji	Democratic	January 1, 2024 – present
County clerk	Taylor Bruck	Democratic	August 22, 2024 – present

Legislative authority is vested in the county legislature, which consists of 23 members elected from individual districts, as directed by a county charter reapportionment mandate starting in late 2010. Of the members of the 2026 county legislature, 19 are part of the Democratic caucus (all 19 are affiliated with the Democratic Party), and 4 are part of the Republican aucus (all 4 are affiliated with the Republican Party).

Ulster county legislature (2026)
District	Legislator	Party	Caucus	Residence
	Aaron Levine, deputy majority leader	Democratic	Democratic	Saugerties
	Ann Peters	Democratic	Democratic	Saugerties
	Jason Kovacs	Republican	Republican	Ulster
	Michael Berardi	Democratic	Democratic	Ulster
	Abe Uchitelle, majority leader	Democratic	Democratic	Kingston
	Greg McCoullough	Democratic	Democratic	Kingston
	Peter Criswell, chair	Democratic	Democratic	Kingston
	Joe Donaldson	Democratic	Democratic	Port Ewen
	Amy Dooley	Democratic	Democratic	Highland
	Dominick Marino	Democratic	Democratic	Highland
	Laura Donovan	Democratic	Democratic	Marlborough
	Kevin Roberts, minority leader	Republican	Republican	Plattekill
	Richard Walls	Republican	Republican	Wallkill
	Craig Lopez, deputy minority leader	Republican	Republican	Pine Bush
	Thomas J. Briggs	Democratic	Democratic	Ellenville
	Debra Clinton	Democratic	Democratic	Gardiner
	Megan Sperry, vice chair	Democratic	Democratic	Rifton
	Eric Stewart	Democratic	Democratic	Accord
	Lindsey Grossman	Democratic	Democratic	Cottekill
	Bill Murray	Democratic	Democratic	New Paltz
	Chris Hewitt	Democratic	Democratic	Kerhonkson
	Kathy Nolan	Democratic	Democratic	Mount Tremper
	Jeff Collins	Democratic	Democratic	Woodstock

== Recreation ==
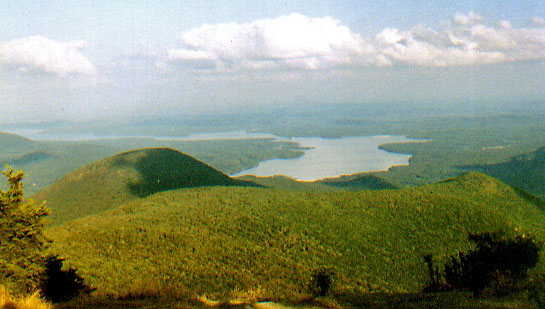
Ashokan Reservoir from Wittenberg

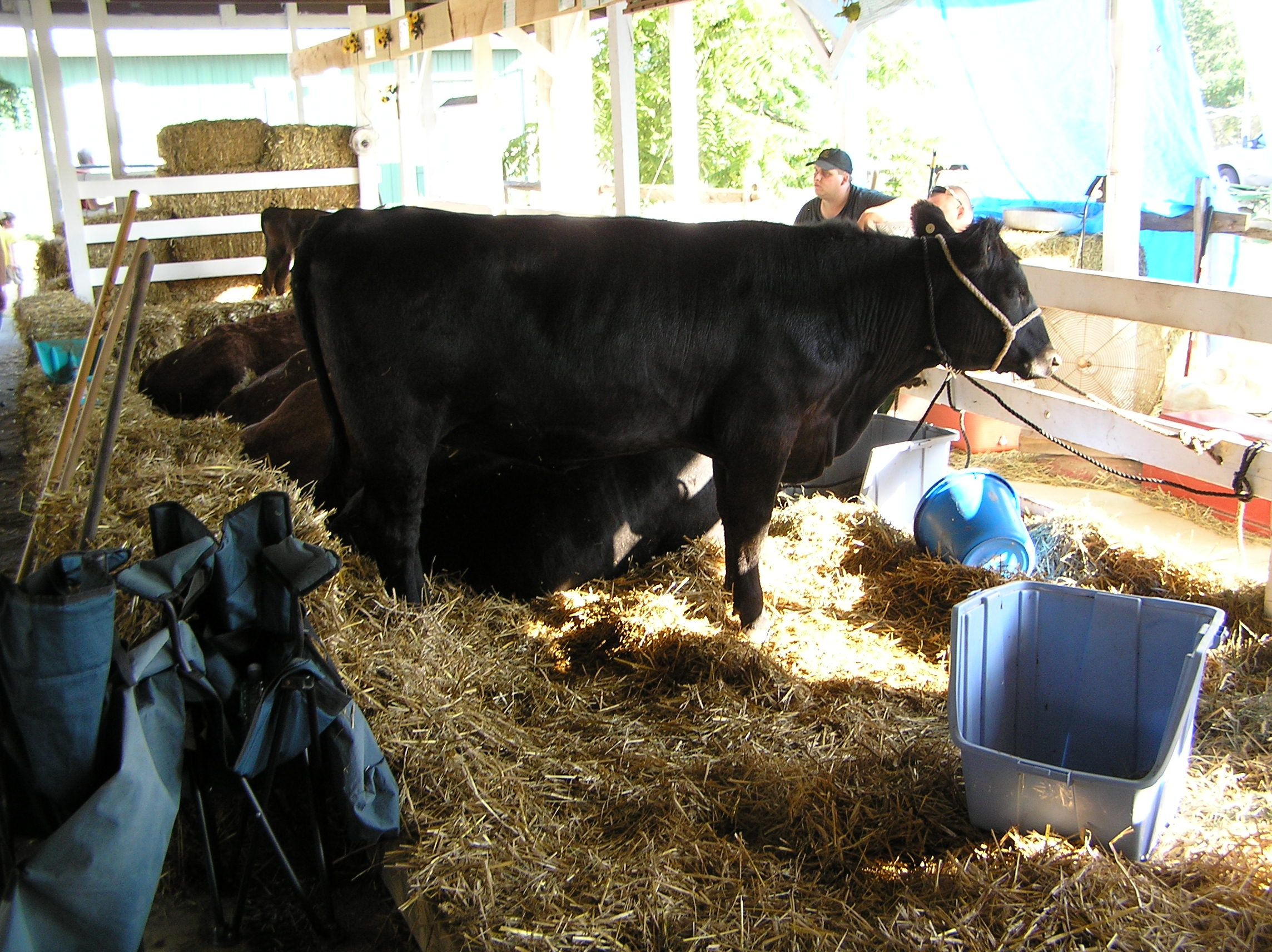
A cow at the Ulster County Fair

Ulster County contains a large part of Catskill Park and the Catskill Forest Preserve. The former Delaware and Hudson Canal brought Pennsylvania coal to Kingston on the Hudson. Former Orleans band member John Hall served in the Ulster County legislature before moving to the 19th Congressional District to run for Congress.

Ulster County has continued to be a popular vacation destination for many decades. The county is home to many outdoor landscapes, including the Catskill Mountains, the Hudson River, Minnewaska State Park, Catskill Park, Shawangunk Mountains, Bear Hill Preserve, and the Shawangunk Ridge. Each offers various recreation opportunities, including hiking, bicycling, skiing, horseback riding, kayaking, rock climbing, hunting and fishing.

The county also includes more than 40 miles (64 km) of rail trails along the Hudson Valley Rail Trail, Wallkill Valley Rail Trail, and O&W Rail Trail. The Walkway Over the Hudson, the world's longest pedestrian and bicycle bridge which spans the Hudson River, is connected within Ulster County trails. The Ashokan Rail Trail runs along the north side of the Ashokan Reservoir.

Ulster County has also played a role in some significant moments in U.S. history. The Senate House State Historic Site in Kingston, New York, is where, in early 1777, American colonists met to ratify the New York Constitution.

The Ulster County Fair has been held in New Paltz for many years and is promoted as "The Best Six Days of Summer". County-run recreation areas include the Ulster County Pool in New Paltz and the Ulster Landing Park in Saugerties.

Since 2016, Kingston Stockade FC, a semi-professional soccer team that plays in the National Premier Soccer League (NPSL), has been based in Kingston and plays its home matches at Dietz Stadium.

Also since 2015, the Saugerties Stallions, a collegiate summer baseball league team that plays in the Perfect Game Collegiate Baseball League (PGCBL), have been based in Saugerties and play their home games at Cantine Field. The Stallions won the 2021 PGCBL Championship.

== Transportation ==
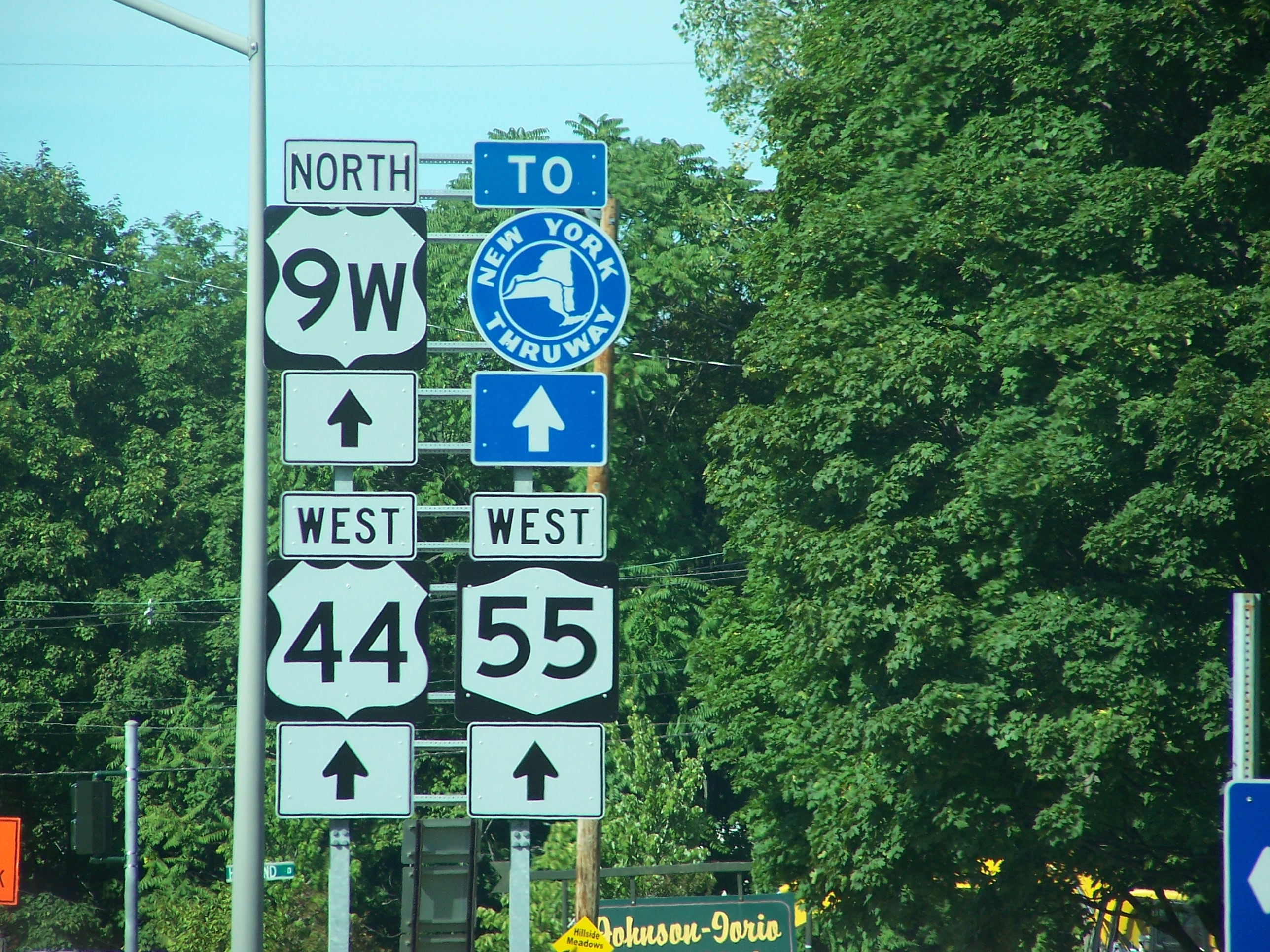
A shield assembly of NY 55, US 44, and US 9W after the Mid-Hudson Bridge

Public transportation in Ulster County is provided by Trailways of New York to and from New York City and Albany, and along Routes 28 and 32, by Ulster County Area Transit on major state and U.S. road corridors in the county.

As of 2025, there is no rail service in Ulster County. However, there are several stations nearby, including Rhinecliff station , Poughkeepsie station, Beacon station, and Port Jervis station.

=== Major roadways ===
The New York State Thruway (I-87) runs north–south through the county, carrying traffic between New York City and Albany and its surroundings. NY 55, NY 52, and NY 28 are all major east–west highways that run through the county, and US 209, US 9W, and NY 32 are major north–south highways.

- I-87 / New York Thruway
- I-587
- US 9W
- US 44
- US 209
- NY 28
- NY 28A
- NY 32
- NY 32A
- NY 42
- NY 52
- NY 55
- NY 55A
- NY 199
- NY 208
- NY 212
- NY 213
- NY 214
- NY 299
- NY 300
- NY 375

== Communities ==
Ulster County, New York

=== City ===
- Kingston (county seat)

=== Towns ===
- Denning
- Esopus
- Gardiner
- Hardenburgh
- Hurley
- Kingston
- Lloyd
- Marbletown
- Marlborough
- New Paltz
- Olive
- Plattekill
- Rochester
- Rosendale
- Saugerties
- Shandaken
- Shawangunk
- Ulster
- Wawarsing
- Woodstock

=== Villages ===
- Ellenville
- New Paltz
- Saugerties

=== Census-designated places ===
- Accord
- Clintondale
- Cragsmoor
- East Kingston
- Gardiner
- Glasco
- High Falls
- Highland
- Hillside
- Hurley
- Kerhonkson
- Lake Katrine
- Lincoln Park
- Malden-on-Hudson
- Marlboro
- Milton
- Napanoch
- Phoenicia
- Pine Hill
- Plattekill
- Port Ewen
- Rifton
- Rosendale
- Ruby
- Saugerties South
- Shokan
- Stone Ridge
- Tillson
- Walker Valley
- Wallkill
- Watchtower
- West Hurley
- Woodstock
- Zena

=== Hamlets ===
- Bearsville
- Big Indian
- Bloomington
- Boiceville
- Brown's Station
- Centerville
- Chichester
- Cottekill
- Kaatsbaan
- Krumville
- Lew Beach
- Modena
- Mt. Pleasant
- Mt. Tremper
- Olivebridge
- Oliverea
- Palentown
- Samsonville
- Seager
- Shady
- Spring Glen
- Sundown
- Tabasco
- Wallkill
- West Park
- West Saugerties
- West Shokan
- Willow

== Education ==
School districts include:

- Ellenville Central School District
- Fallsburg Central School District
- Highland Central School District
- Kingston City School District
- Livingston Manor Central School District
- Margaretville Central School District
- Marlboro Central School District
- New Paltz Central School District
- Onteora Central School District
- Pine Bush Central School District
- Rondout Valley Central School District
- Saugerties Central School District
- Tri-Valley Central School District
- Valley Central School District (Montgomery)
- Wallkill Central School District

The State University of New York at New Paltz is located in New Paltz.

== See also ==
- List of counties in New York
- National Register of Historic Places listings in Ulster County, New York
