= Woodstock (CDP), New York =

Woodstock, New York
- CDP
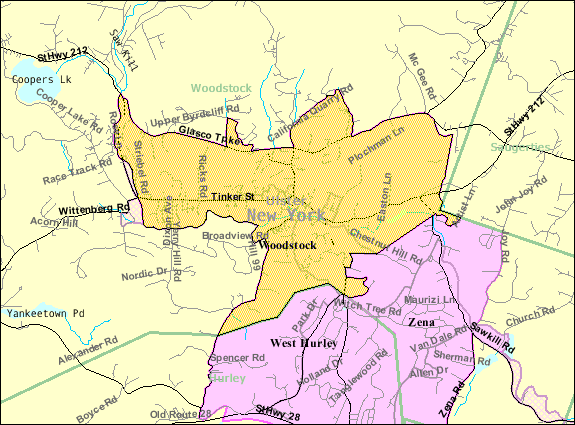
- U.S. Census Map

- Location in Ulster County and the state of New York.
- Coordinates: 42°2′25″N 74°7′2″W
- Country: United States
- State: New York
- County: Ulster

Area
  - Total: 6.85 sq mi (17.75 km^{2})
  - Land: 6.85 sq mi (17.73 km^{2})
  - Water: 0.0077 sq mi (0.02 km^{2})
- Elevation: 561 ft (171 m)

Population (2020)
  - Total: 2,521
  - Density: 368.3/sq mi (142.22/km^{2})
- Time zone: UTC-5 (Eastern (EST))
  - Summer (DST): UTC-4 (EDT)
- ZIP code: 12498
- Area code: 845
- FIPS code: 36-83041
- GNIS feature ID: 0971721

Woodstock is a hamlet (and census-designated place) in Ulster County, New York, United States. The population was 2,521 according to the 2020 census. The community of Woodstock is in the eastern part of the Town of Woodstock and is northwest of Kingston. It is located along NY 212 near its junction with NY 375. Although the name of the community and the town lent its name to the Woodstock Festival, that event did not take place in Woodstock.

== Geography ==
Woodstock is located at 42°2′24″N 74°7′2″W (42.040269, -74.117258).

According to the United States Census Bureau, the CDP has a total area of 5.9 square miles (15.3 km^{2}), of which 5.9 square miles (15.3 km^{2}) is land and 0.17% is water.

== Demographics ==
Historical population
Census	Pop.	Note	%±
2000	2,187		—
2010	2,088		−4.5%
2020	2,521		20.7%
U.S. Decennial Census

As of the census of 2000, there were 2,187 people, 1,124 households, and 528 families residing in the CDP. The population density was 370.3 inhabitants per square mile (143.0/km^{2}). There were 1,385 housing units at an average density of 234.5 per square mile (90.5/km^{2}). The racial makeup of the CDP was 93.23% White, 1.55% Black or African American, 0.23% Native American, 1.78% Asian, 0.64% from other races, and 2.56% from two or more races. Hispanic or Latino of any race were 3.89% of the population.

There were 1,124 households, out of which 19.6% had children under the age of 18 living with them, 35.1% were married couples living together, 9.1% had a female householder with no husband present, and 53.0% were non-families. 43.4% of all households were made up of individuals, and 14.1% had someone living alone who was 65 years of age or older. The average household size was 1.94 and the average family size was 2.64.

In the CDP, the population was spread out, with 16.9% under the age of 18, 5.0% from 18 to 24, 23.4% from 25 to 44, 36.0% from 45 to 64, and 18.7% who were 65 years of age or older. The median age was 48 years. For every 100 females, there were 90.0 males. For every 100 females age 18 and over, there were 87.4 males.

The median income for a household in the CDP was $38,594, and the median income for a family was $46,467. Males had a median income of $31,000 versus $30,357 for females. The per capita income for the CDP was $28,478. About 7.5% of families and 11.9% of the population were below the poverty line, including 15.7% of those under age 18 and 4.9% of those age 65 or over.

== Education ==
The school district for most of the CDP is Onteora Central School District. A portion of the CDP is in Saugerties Central School District.
