= West Hurley, New York =

- CDP
- Location in Ulster County and the state of New York.
- Coordinates: 42°0′16″N 74°6′34″W
- Country: United States
- State: New York
- County: Ulster

Area
  - Total: 3.79 sq mi (9.81 km^{2})
  - Land: 3.79 sq mi (9.81 km^{2})
  - Water: 0 sq mi (0.00 km^{2})
- Elevation: 597 ft (182 m)

Population (2020)
  - Total: 1,917
  - Density: 506.2/sq mi (195.43/km^{2})
- Time zone: UTC-5 (Eastern (EST))
  - Summer (DST): UTC-4 (EDT)
- ZIP code: 12491
- Area code: 845
- FIPS code: 36-80291
- GNIS feature ID: 0969272

West Hurley is a hamlet (and census-designated place) in Ulster County, New York, United States. The population was 1,917 at the 2020 census.

West Hurley is located in the Town of Hurley and is inside the Catskill Park. The community is northwest of Kingston on Route 28.

It was one of many villages that were flooded during the creation of the Ashokan Reservoir. The village was moved, and currently resides on the northern bank of the reservoir.

== Geography ==
West Hurley is located at 42°0′16″N 74°6′34″W (42.004442, -74.109312).

According to the United States Census Bureau, the CDP has a total area of 3.8 square miles (9.8 km^{2}), all land.

== Demographics ==
Historical population
| Census | Pop. | Note | %± |
|---|---|---|---|
| 2000 | 2,105 | | — |
| 2010 | 1,939 | | −7.9% |
| 2020 | 1,917 | | −1.1% |
U.S. Decennial Census

As of the census of 2000, there were 2,105 people, 866 households, and 600 families residing in the CDP. The population density was 557.2 inhabitants per square mile (215.1/km^{2}). There were 954 housing units at an average density of 252.5 per square mile (97.5/km^{2}). The racial makeup of the CDP was 94.54% White, 1.47% African American, 1.76% Asian, 0.10% Pacific Islander, 0.76% from other races, and 1.38% from two or more races. Hispanic or Latino of any race were 2.09% of the population.

There were 866 households, out of which 29.0% had children under the age of 18 living with them, 56.7% were married couples living together, 9.1% had a female householder with no husband present, and 30.7% were non-families. 25.3% of all households were made up of individuals, and 11.0% had someone living alone who was 65 years of age or older. The average household size was 2.40 and the average family size was 2.89.

In the CDP, the population was spread out, with 22.4% under the age of 18, 4.1% from 18 to 24, 21.0% from 25 to 44, 34.5% from 45 to 64, and 17.9% who were 65 years of age or older. The median age was 46 years. For every 100 females, there were 88.5 males. For every 100 females age 18 and over, there were 84.9 males.

The median income for a household in the CDP was $54,615, and the median income for a family was $66,250. Males had a median income of $50,114 versus $30,000 for females. The per capita income for the CDP was $27,992. About 4.7% of families and 6.5% of the population were below the poverty line, including 10.6% of those under age 18 and 5.6% of those age 65 or over.

== Education ==
The school district is Onteora Central School District.
