= Ashokan Rail Trail =

Recreational trail in New York, US

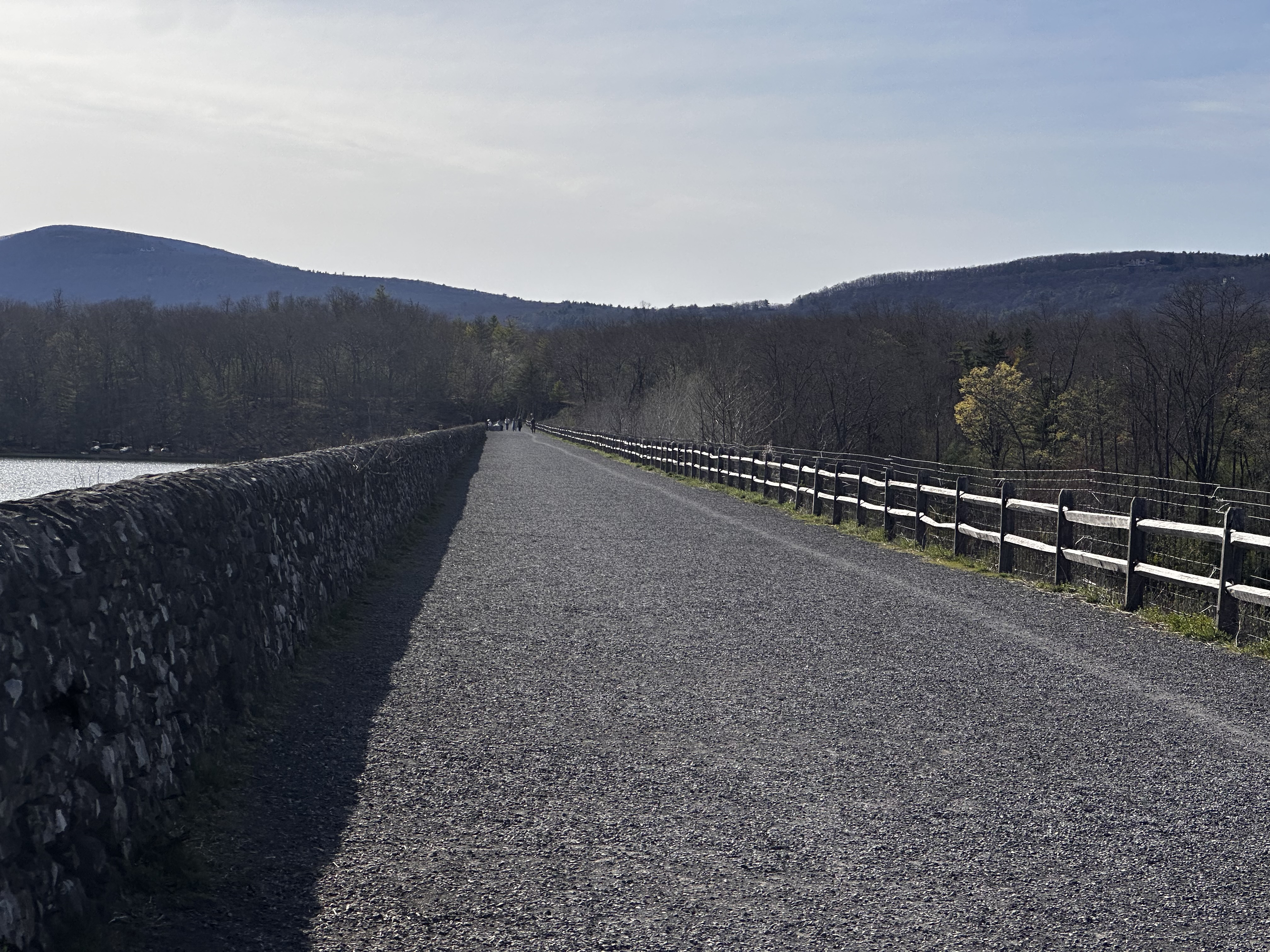
- Glenford Dike section, 2025
- Length: 11.5 mi (18.5 km)
- Location: North of Ashokan Reservoir, Catskill Park, New York, US
- Began construction: 2018
- Completed: 2019
- Trailheads: West Hurley, Ashokan and Boiceville
- Use: Pedestrians, bicycles, and wheelchairs; cross-country skiing and snowshoeing in winter.
- Highest point: 660 ft (200 m)
- Lowest point: 581 ft (177 m)
- Season: Year-round
- Sights: Views of mountains and reservoir
- Maintained by: Ulster County
- Website: ashokanrailtrail.com

The Ashokan Rail Trail is located on the north side of Ashokan Reservoir and Esopus Creek in the towns of Hurley and Olive, New York, United States. It is an 11.5-mile-long (18.5 km) pathway along the former route of the Ulster and Delaware Railroad (U&D) between West Hurley and Boiceville. It was opened partially in 2019 and fully in 2020, allowing the general public recreational access to that land for the first time in over a century, since New York City built the reservoir for its water supply system.

After Conrail discontinued freight service along the tracks in 1976, they were used by the Catskill Mountain Railroad (CMRR) for excursion trains along that portion of the U&D line it owned between Kingston and Phoenicia, under a lease from Ulster County, which had acquired them from the bankrupt Penn Central. The CMRR was never able to fully rehabilitate the tracks as the lease required, and damage caused by Hurricane Irene in 2011 was beyond its ability to repair, and in 2017 Ulster County terminated the railroad's lease on section where the rail trail is now, replacing the damaged Boiceville Trestle in the process with a newer, flood-resistant structure.

Discussions continue over plans to connect the rail trail to longer regional trails in the state's Empire State Trail network. The county has yet to designate a use for the 1.7-mile (2.7 km) section of the rail line just east of the West Hurley trailhead in the towns of Woodstock and Kingston. The CMRR has advocated for rail-with-trail on the segment and has applied for a permit to build a station complex to serve the rail trail. Local conservationists have advocated for an extension of the rail trail on that section, arguing that environmental and engineering issues make the rail-with-trail option more costly than the railroad estimates. Discussions of the issue have become increasingly divisive.

== Route ==
The rail trail officially begins at the railroad's 10th milepost (MP), marked along its route by signs every half-mile (800 m) with the number prefixed by a "K", just west of where it crosses over Basin Road near the western corner of the town of Woodstock. It is just east of the Ashokan Reservoir, part of the New York City water supply system's Catskill/Delaware watershed, and a short distance south of New York State Route 28, at 581 feet (177 m) above sea level. Within its first half-mile it crosses into the town of Hurley and runs abreast of the reservoir at Woodstock Dike, site of its eastern trailhead and parking lot in West Hurley, where views of the 13-square-mile (34 km^{2}) reservoir and adjacent peaks of the Catskill Mountains are available.

Continuing west through the forested lands that buffer the reservoir for another half-mile, sometimes through rock cuts, the trail bends slightly towards the northwest. It reaches the longer Glenford Dike, with wider views of the reservoir and some of the Catskill High Peaks to its west. This section continues for a quarter-mile (400 m) after which the trail re-enters a narrow strip of woods between the reservoir and NY 28. A mile further, it returns to its western course, running less than a hundred feet (30 m) south of the highway, reaching 680 feet (210 m) in elevation and curving southwest after another mile.

After another four miles, the trail enters the town of Olive and reaches the site of the former Ashokan station, now another trailhead and parking lot. Some sections in the next mile are on wooden boardwalk over wetlands abutting the reservoir. Following that it crosses under Reservoir Road south of the hamlet of Shokan. Three-quarters of a mile west of that crossing, it curves northwest again and crosses Butternut Creek at Butternut Bridge near MP 18.5.

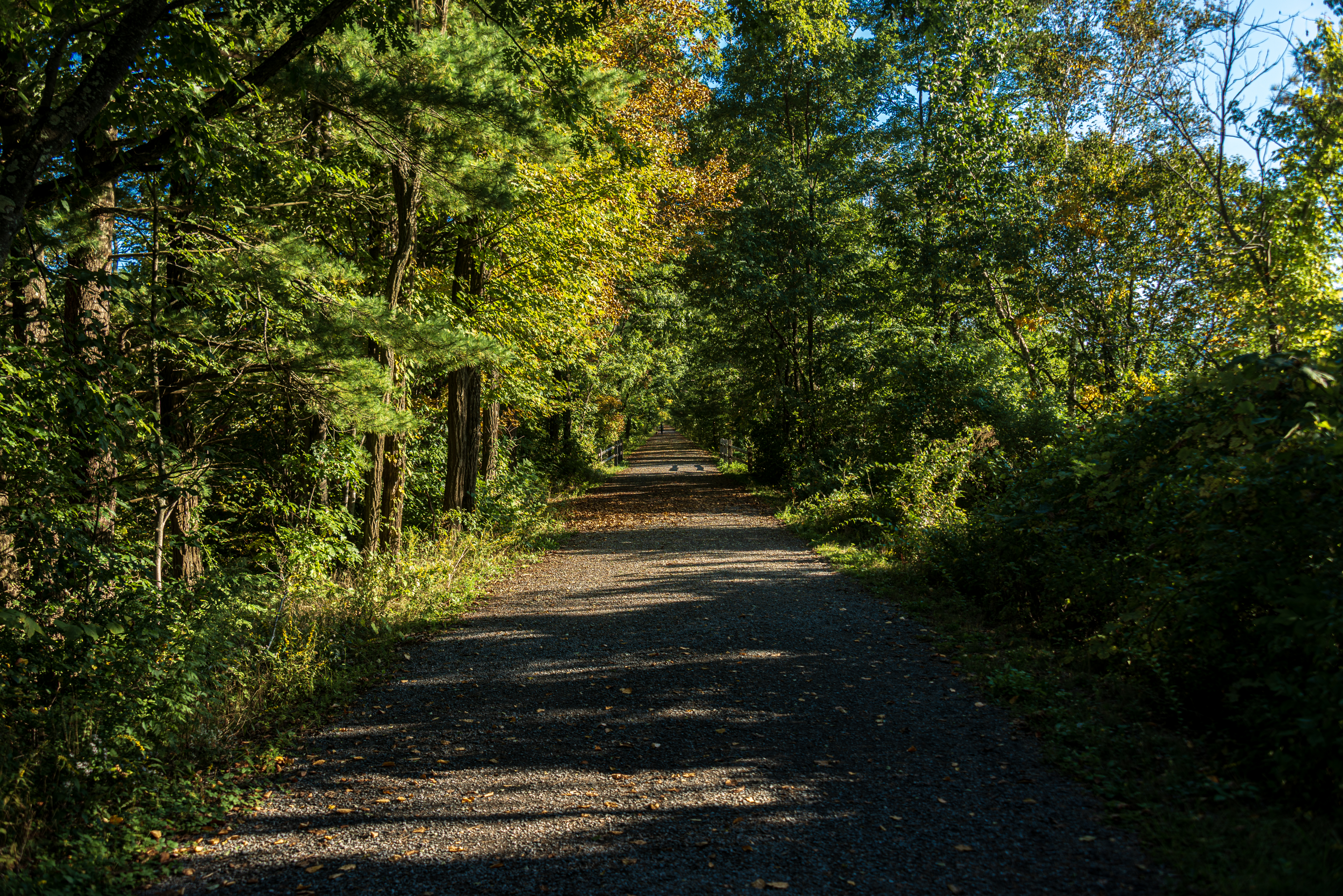
Trail along Esopus Creek near Boiceville

Over the next two miles, the trail begins curving northward and eventually runs along the bank of the reservoir, offering views to mountains like 3,090-foot (940 m) Ashokan High Point south of West Shokan across the reservoir and High Peaks Balsam Cap, Cornell, Friday, and Wittenberg mountains to the southwest. At MP 20.5, a half-mile causeway section takes the trail to the western end of the reservoir, where the upper section of Esopus Creek drains into it. The trail continues turning, going almost due north as it crosses the Esopus at the rebuilt Boiceville Trestle and ends at its western trailhead and parking lot near Boiceville, along New York State Route 28A.

== History ==
=== 1866–1932: Ulster and Delaware Railroad ===
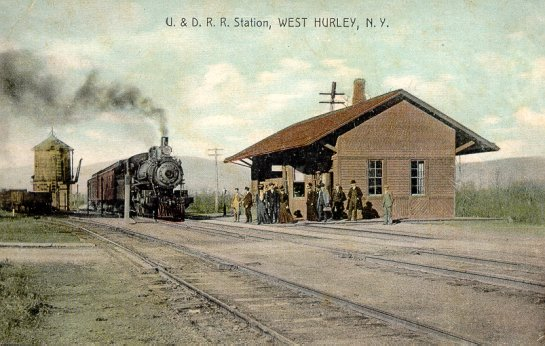
The U&D's West Hurley station, located near the current eastern end of the rail trail, shown in 1902

In the middle of the 19th century, Thomas Cornell, already wealthy from the steamboats he operated along the Hudson River, saw further opportunity in developing a rail link from Kingston across the Catskills in Ulster County that would connect with other railroads in New York's interior serving the Great Lakes. In 1866 he incorporated the Rondout & Oswego Railroad, which built tracks as far west as Roxbury in Delaware County over the next six years before being reorganized as the New York, Kingston & Syracuse after going bankrupt. In 1875 it became the Ulster & Delaware Railroad (U&D) following another bankruptcy.

The U&D made the line profitable through the early 20th century. It shipped bluestone quarried in the Catskills to the river where it was shipped to New York City for use as sidewalks, dairy products from the region's farms and coal from Northeastern Pennsylvania. In return, passengers came upriver to spend their summers at the Catskill Mountain House and other popular large resorts. Ferries across the Hudson also allowed passengers from that region to take what was advertised as the only all-weather route to the Catskills. In 1900 the U&D achieved Cornell's original goal, reaching Oneonta in Otsego County, where it interlinked with the Delaware & Hudson Railroad's service along the Susquehanna River.

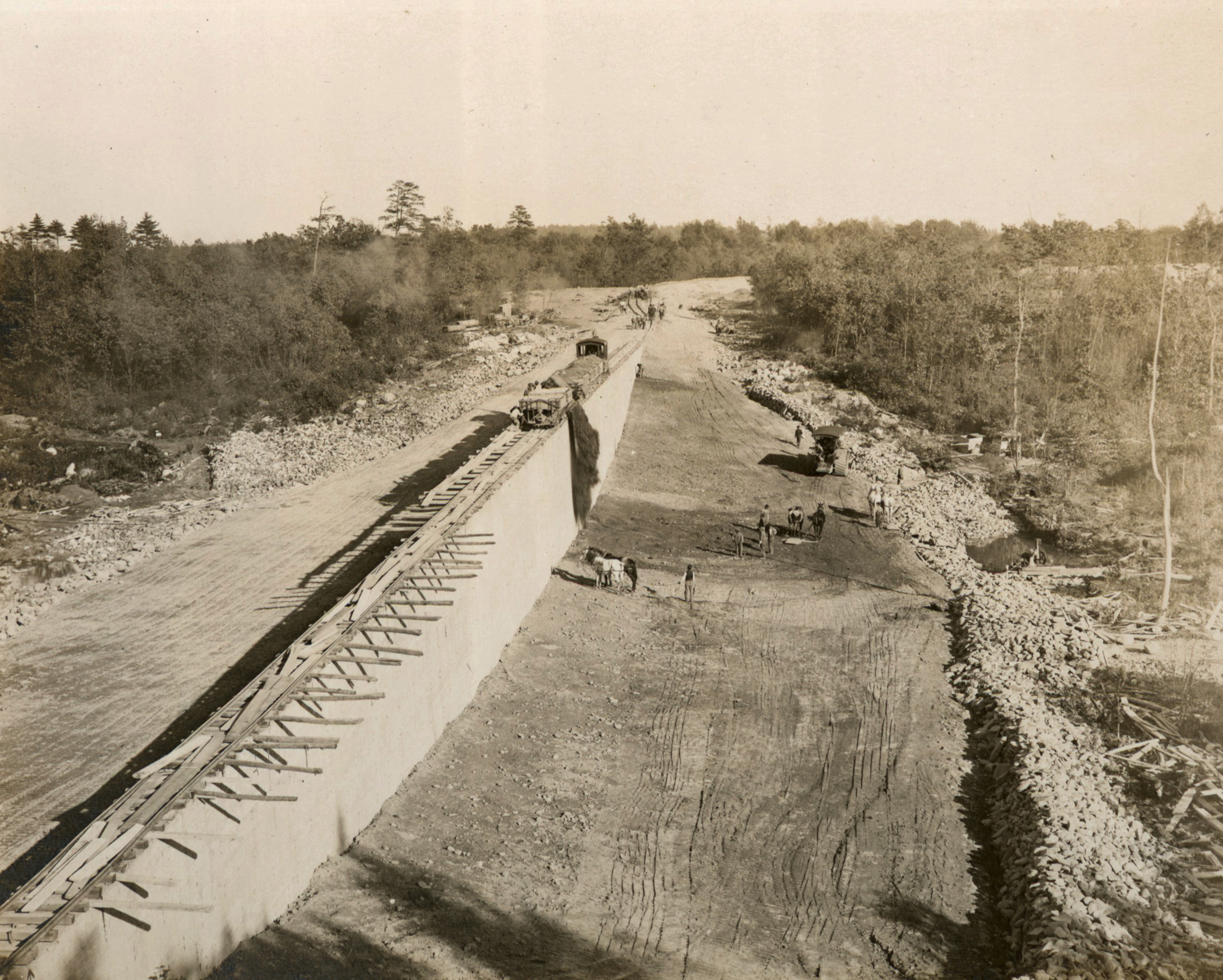
Construction of Woodstock Dike, now at the rail trail's West Hurley trailhead, in 1910

In 1913, over half a million passengers rode the U&D in the railroad's peak year. At the same time freight shipments were up as it brought material for the construction of the reservoir. That project would require moving the stretch of track north, to the current route of the rail trail. During the track relocation, a 2,000-foot (610 m), 10-foot-wide (3.0 m) pedestrian walkway was built at the location of Glenford Dike, separated from the tracks by a 3–4-foot-high (91–122 cm) stone wall. This may possibly be the earliest deliberate construction of a rail with trail in the U.S.

Several settlements were inundated under the reservoir and the stations serving them moved or abandoned. This adversely affected the railroad's passenger volume, along with a trend towards shorter summer vacations and the opening of competing resorts in other mountainous areas. Freight, too, began to suffer during the 1920s as roads improved and trucking became economically feasible.

=== 1932–1976: New York Central and Conrail ===
By the onset of the Great Depression, the U&D was again financially strapped. Its directors approached the dominant New York Central Railroad (NYCRR) about purchasing the U&D, the only way they saw to save service. Initially rebuffed, they achieved their goal when the Interstate Commerce Commission, the national rail regulator at the time, made a consolidation of NYCRR subsidiaries in the Midwest contingent on the larger railroad also acquiring the U&D. The NYCRR immediately downgraded speeds on the line, now its Catskill Mountain Branch, and planned to eliminate passenger service. Due to World War II it did not do so until 1954.

In the late 1960s the NYCRR, facing financial difficulties itself, merged with its archrival the Pennsylvania Railroad to become the Penn Central. In 1970 the merged railroad itself went bankrupt. Such freight operations as remained on the Catskill Mountain Branch were ended by federally-operated Conrail shortly after it took over the line in 1976.

=== 1977–2016: Catskill Mountain Railroad ===
Many of the communities in Ulster County saw possibilities for renewing service along the line, and called for it to be purchased by the county to make that happen. The estate of Penn Central, which still owned it, would not sufficiently lower the asking price until a tour of the line publicized by political commentator William F. Buckley Jr. in 1977. Two years later, the estate transferred the 38.6 mi (62.1 km) of the line in the county to the county in return for $1.5 million in forgiven tax debt. In 1983 the county in turn leased it to the newly-formed Catskill Mountain Railroad (CMRR), which soon began limited freight operations in the Kingston area and heritage passenger service from Phoenicia. The terms of the lease required the CMRR to rehabilitate and develop at least a mile of track per year, and sufficient progress was made for it to be renewed in 1991.

The CMRR's volunteers worked to rehabilitate the track near the reservoir with the goal of providing continuous service between its terminals. Weather incidents required repairs to the tracks, particular along the Esopus in 1987, preventing that. The 2011 flooding of Esopus Creek caused by Hurricane Irene swept away part of the Boiceville Trestle, cutting the line in two. Repairs were impossible for the railroad to manage, and in 2016 the county declined to renew the CMRR's lease for that portion of the line.

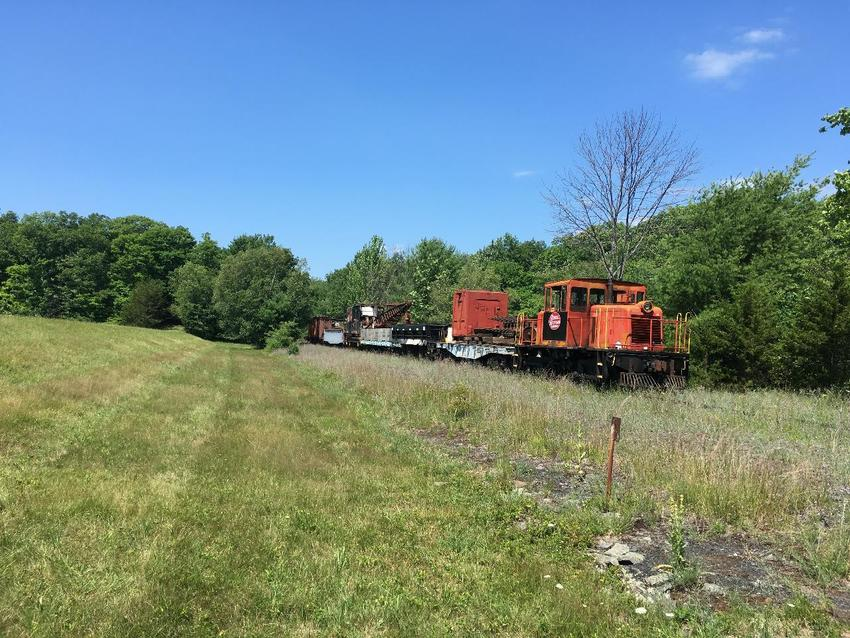
CMRR worktrain at Woodstock Dike, near present-day West Hurley, before rail trail construction

In 2014 the county legislature, dissatisfied with the CMRR's progress in converting the entire line for tourist use, passed a resolution calling for the entire portion from Kingston to Boiceville to be converted to a rail trail. The railroad filed suit, and the county settled the next year, adopting a plan whereby different parts of the line corridor would be designated for rail or trail use.

=== 2017–present: Rail trail ===
The county created an advisory commission to recommend uses for the corridor. It hired Stone Consulting, which found rail trail to be the highest and best use for the section north of the reservoir. As obstacles to rail use, it noted the poor condition of the tracks, the need to replace the bridges at Butternut Creek and Boiceville, and the limited views available other than the two dikes (Stone wrote that the CMRR crews described the 8-mile (13 km) section between Glenford Dike and the approach to Boiceville as a "green tunnel", observing that "at 15 mph (24 km/h), that's at least half an hour of nothing from the windows but trees and close-in forest views").

Despite the CMRR's original goal of offering a workable rail route all the way to Phoenicia, it had not included any plans for this section in its annual business plans since a 2008 washout, seeing the reservoir section as offering little possibility of increased ridership. Nor did the memorandum of understanding between the county and the New York City Department of Environmental Protection (DEP), which owns the land around the reservoir, on the use of the corridor at Glenford Dike even mention passenger rail use to that point, due to DEP's concerns about runoff from rail operations contaminating the reservoir. "Overall, the location, scenery, accessibility, ease-of-use, and combination of both isolation and access should produce a trail and recreation product that could provide the majority of projected trail destination use within the entire corridor", Stone concluded. "The almost complete unanimity of this opinion from so many viewpoints actually surprised us, and the environmental, political, and funding climates appear to be converging to achieve this goal." The only serious obstacle Stone saw was funding to rebuild the Boiceville Trestle, since a large Federal Emergency Management Agency (FEMA) grant that could be used for that purpose was contingent on restoring the previous use. That issue might, the report suggested, be mitigated by reusing the beams and raising the bridge.

Plans were drawn up for the rail trail in 2017 and construction began the following year on a 12-foot-wide (3.7 m) pathway, to be surfaced in locally quarried crushed stone, except a 565-foot (172 m) elevated wooden boardwalk over wetlands in one section. The surface ensures the entire route is disabled-accessible; a permeable surface was also required by DEP. Construction, at a cost of $16.5 million ($20.2 million in 2024) began in 2018 and the full trail was open by the end of 2019.

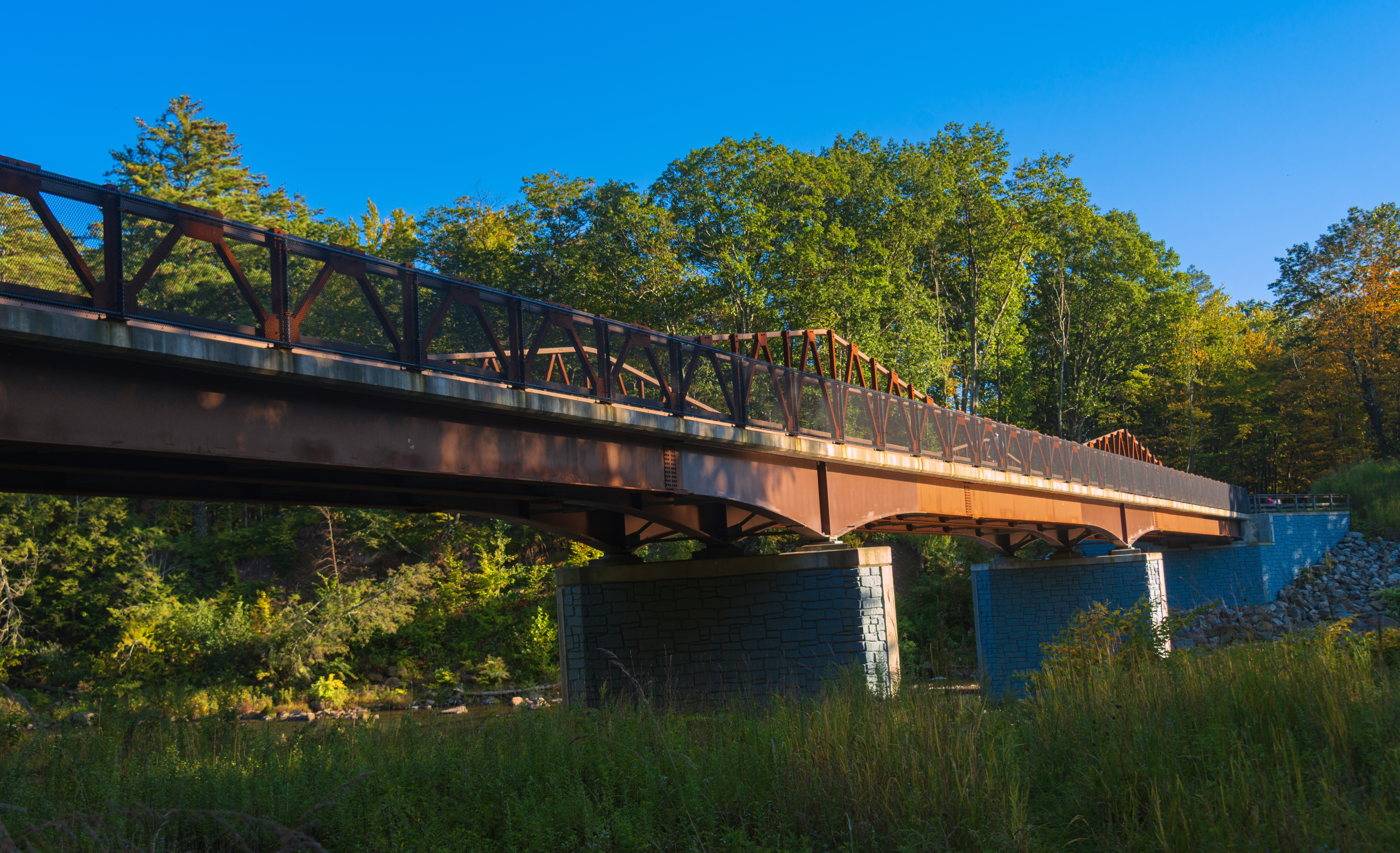
The rebuilt Boiceville Trestle

The Boiceville Trestle was rebuilt as a footbridge, three spans supported by continuous steel girders. To make it more flood-resistant in the future, it was extended in length to 354 feet (108 m), 60 feet (18 m) longer than its predecessor, so it could be raised 7 feet (2.1 m) higher above the Esopus. Interpretive plaques were placed at various intervals along the trail, informing users of the history of the railroad, reservoir and region.

== Possible extension to east ==
As of 2026 the county has not designated a use for the 1.7-mile (2.7 km) segment of the U&D corridor from the rail trail's current end at the Basin Road overpass to the intersection of the tracks with NY 28A at Stony Hollow. Trail advocates would like that segment to be trail-only so that could better be connected to the Empire State Trail network planned to run parallel to the Hudson River through Kingston; the track would have to be widened for rail and trail. This, they say, cannot be done at a reasonable cost given the federally protected wetlands adjacent to part of the segment.

The CMRR has disputed this, arguing that if a boardwalk similar to the one already used by the rail trail were built in the wetlands area, there would be minimal additional cost. According to the railroad, Stony Hollow is a poor location for its terminal. Walkers seeking the views from the two dikes will drive to the West Hurley trailhead rather than climb the 2% grade on the segment. In 2025 the CMRR received a state grant to build a terminal complex on land it leases at Basin Road; it was later suspended after it was discovered the county had indicated its support of the project. The dispute between the two sides has become rancorous, with accusations of bad faith and subterfuge; the CMRR says it has had equipment vandalized on several occasions.

== See also ==
- List of rail trails in New York

== Works cited ==
Stone Consulting, Inc. (November 2015). "County of Ulster, NY — Highest and Best Use Recommendations — U&D Railroad Corridor" (PDF). Ulster County, New York.
