= New York State Route 28A =

State highway in Ulster County, New York, US

New York State Route 28A
- NY 28A highlighted in red

Route information
- Auxiliary route of NY 28
- Maintained by NYCDOT and Ulster County
- Length: 19.82 mi (31.90 km)
- Existed: c. 1933–present

Major junctions
- West end: NY 28 in Olive
- East end: NY 28 in Kingston

Location
- Country: United States
- State: New York
- Counties: Ulster

Highway system
- New York Highways; Interstate; US; State; Reference; Parkways
← NY 28	→ NY 28B

New York State Route 28A (NY 28A) is an east–west state highway in Ulster County, New York, in the United States. It extends for nearly 20 miles (32 km) along the south side of Ashokan Reservoir in Catskill Park, serving as a southerly alternate route of NY 28 through the area. Many of the communities along its length, such as West Shokan and Olivebridge, are relocated versions of those condemned for the reservoir's construction. Near Olivebridge, NY 28A intersects NY 213, the only other state route that NY 28A intersects aside from its parent, NY 28.

NY 28A was built in the early 20th century during the Ashokan Reservoir's construction. The highway was built and subsequently maintained by New York City as the result of a 1909 court order, which mandated that the city maintain the reservoir perimeter roads in perpetuity. In the 1930 renumbering of state highways in New York, the portion of the southern loop road between Boiceville and Olivebridge became part of NY 213. The entire southern loop road was redesignated as NY 28A c. 1933. In the 1970s, New York City sought to transfer control of its upstate roads to the New York State Department of Transportation (NYSDOT); however, as of 2013, no action had been taken.

== Route description ==
Maintenance of NY 28A is split between the New York City Department of Transportation (NYCDOT) and Ulster County. NYCDOT maintenance begins at the western junction with NY 28 and ends at a point near Shady Lane, a local street near the eastern end of the reservoir in Hurley. The remaining 1.63 miles (2.62 km) of the highway is county maintained and signed as part of County Route 50 (CR 50).

=== Boiceville to Olivebridge ===
NY 28A begins at a large triangular intersection with NY 28 just south of the hamlet of Boiceville, within the Catskill Park. From there, it heads to the west as a narrow two-lane road, crossing Esopus Creek just west of where it empties into the Ashokan Reservoir. The highway turns southward, loosely paralleling the reservoir shoreline as it heads through the town of Olive. The shoreline itself is less than one-half mile (0.80 km) from NY 28A, separated by woods and the New York City Department of Environmental Protection fences. About one mile (1.6 km) south of Boiceville, the highway crosses Traver Hollow Brook by way of a bridge that leads the road to the lower slopes of Samuels Point, where houses begin to appear in the woods on the western side of the road. NY 28A closely follows the base of the hill, winding back and forth as it heads southward toward the hamlet of West Shokan.

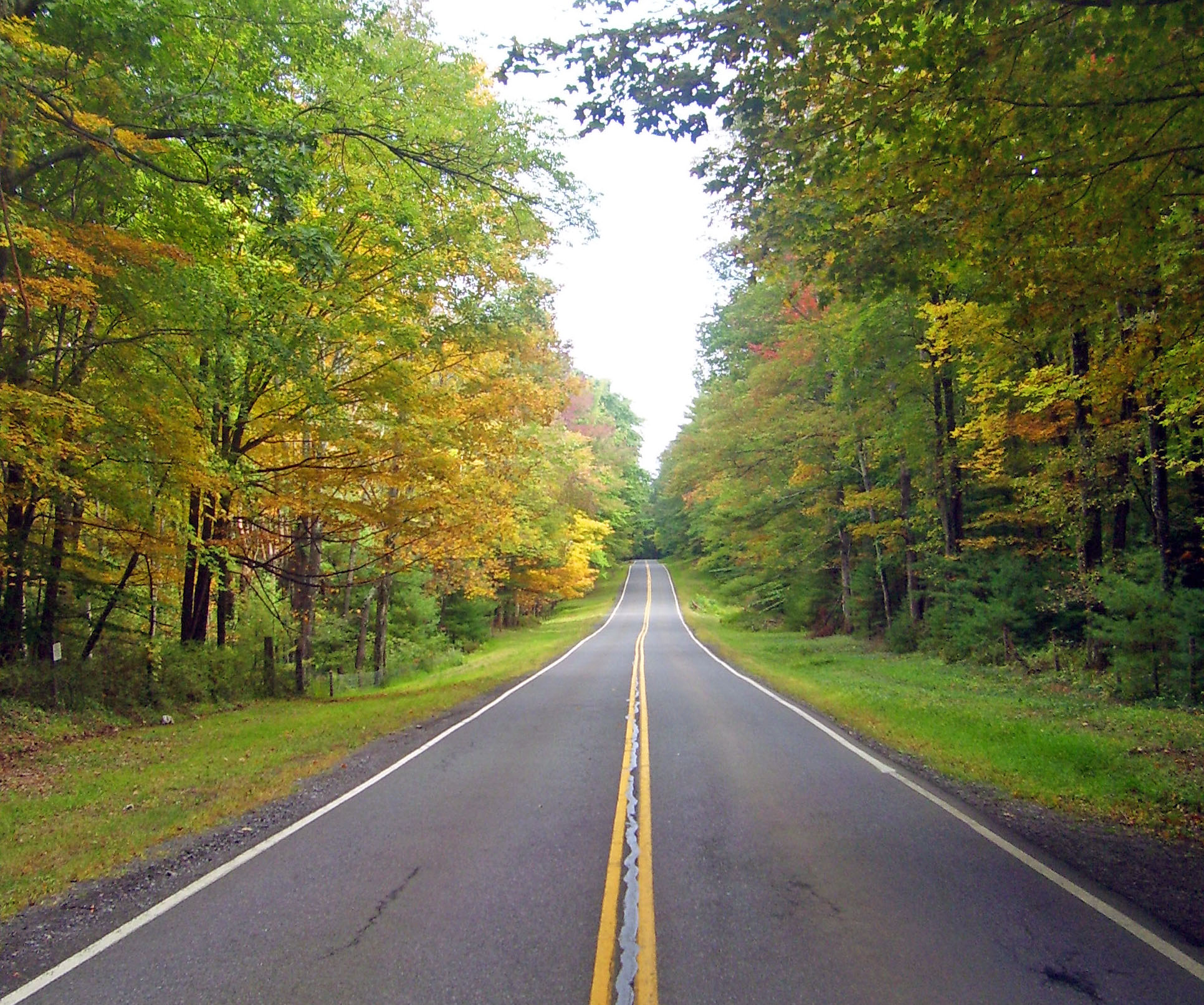
NY 28A east of West Shokan, in New York City watershed land

After one mile (1.6 km) of continuous curves, the road straightens out just north of West Shokan, where it crosses the Bushkill. Immediately beyond the creek is an intersection with Watson Hollow Road (CR 42) and the center of West Shokan. Olive's town hall and municipal garage are a short distance to the west on Watson Hollow Road, which leads through the mountains to Sundown and ultimately to Sullivan County. South of the junction, the area returns and the road continues through some undeveloped stretches. The road closely follows the shoreline here, going east, south, or southeast to match turns in the reservoir's perimeter. Only a handful of homes are located along this stretch, situated at intersections between NY 28A and other local roads.

=== Olivebridge to Stony Hollow ===
Five miles (8.0 km) past West Shokan, NY 28A intersects Monument Road, which used to connect to the reservoir's spillway and the road above the reservoir, which is closed to automobile traffic. The junction has been converted into a small parking area. A one-quarter mile (0.40 km) farther on is the western terminus of NY 213, the only other state route that NY 28A intersects aside from its parent. Although NY 213 is an east–west route, it actually heads due south from this junction to the nearby hamlet of Olivebridge on its way to Stone Ridge and High Falls. Continuing east, NY 28A descends to cross Esopus Creek again before climbing back up to the city's watershed visitor center. Across from the center is Beaverkill Road, a local highway leading southeastward to SUNY New Paltz's outdoor environmental education center and Ashokan Bridge, a covered bridge over Esopus Creek, located on Ashokan Road.

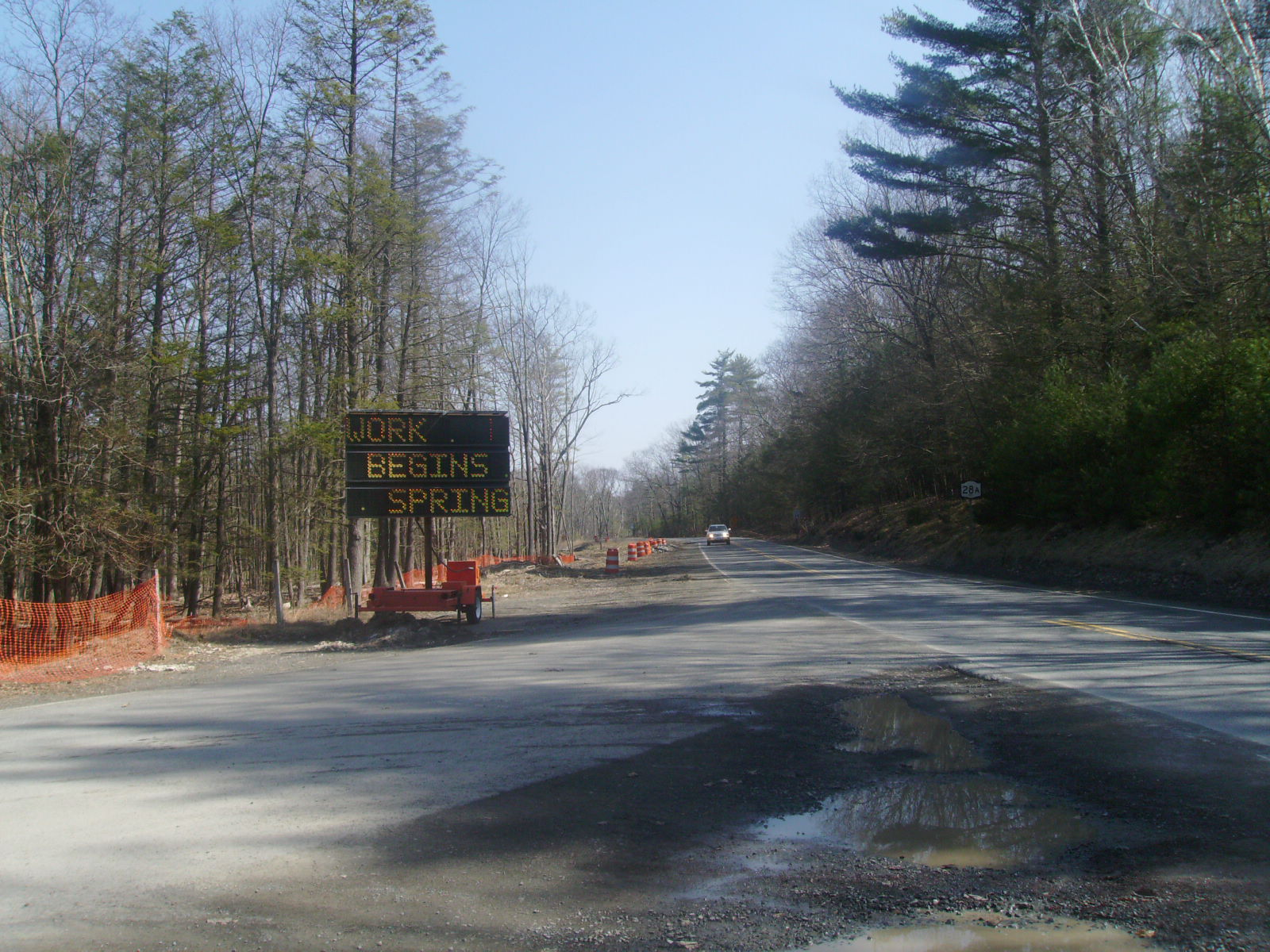
NY 28A at Monument Road before the reconstruction of the highway; a virtual message sign mentions construction beginning in the spring.

Not far from Beaverkill Road is the east end of the spillway road, which was closed as a security precaution following the September 11, 2001 attacks, but reopened after construction of a new alignment of NY 28A was completed in 2012. Past the spillway road, NY 28A continues east, briefly crossing the Blue Line and leaving Catskill Park as it passes another spillway. At the spillway's southeastern tip is a junction with Stone Church Road, where the route turns back to the north and reenters the park. Now in the town of Hurley, NY 28A continues to follow the irregular reservoir shoreline to the northeast, but on an alignment slightly farther inland than before. The land here remains wooded, but more frequently broken by houses on the southern side.

The route reaches the eastern end of the reservoir roughly 0.3 miles (0.48 km) west of Basin Road, at which point it winds back to a northerly heading through some areas where the land slopes down from the road rather than up. The route eventually turns east, leaving the reservoir behind and crossing into the town of Kingston. Here, it runs parallel with NY 28 for just under one mile (1.6 km) before ending at an intersection with the route just east of the hamlet of Stony Hollow. The junction is roughly two miles (3.2 km) west of the city of Kingston, where NY 28 connects to U.S. Route 209 and the Interstate 87 portion of the New York State Thruway.

== History ==
=== Origins and designation ===
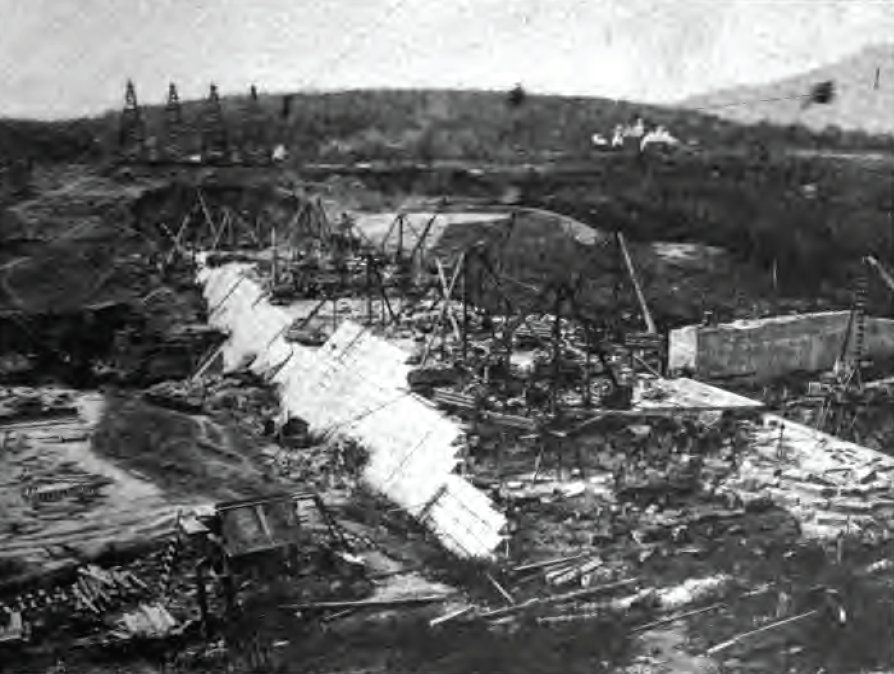
Olivebridge Dam under construction to build the Ashokan Reservoir circa 1910

The origins of NY 28A date back to 1907 when construction began on one of several dams that would eventually create the Ashokan Reservoir, a water body built by New York City to increase its water supply. In the initial stages of construction, seven villages in the reservoir's dimensions were destroyed and 64 miles (103 km) of roads were taken out of service. The latter were to be replaced with 40 miles (64 km) of new roads and 10 bridges carrying the highways around the reservoir's perimeter. According to a 1909 court order, the roads and bridges would be built and maintained by New York City in perpetuity to ensure that the residents displaced by the new reservoir would not be permanently isolated. The city's Board of Estimate initially balked at the measure, citing the mandate as their primary reason for rejecting a June 20, 1913, request by the city's Board of Water Supply for $1.3 million (equivalent to $303 million in 2024) to pave the perimeter roads.

In order to fill the reservoir, the perimeter of the water body—and thus, the roads built along it—had to be completed. Even so, the Board of Estimate sought to have the 1909 court order dropped before allocating the necessary funds toward the roadways. The roads were eventually paved by the State of New York instead. Most of the perimeter road was finished by October 11, 1913, the day that water first began to be added to the reservoir. The entire highway was completed by 1917. While the northern loop road was designated as NY 19 in 1924, the southern loop road went unnumbered until 1930. In the 1930 renumbering of state highways in New York, the Margaretville–Kingston segment of NY 19 became part of an extended NY 28, while the portion of the southern perimeter road west of Olivebridge became part of NY 213. NY 213 was truncated c. 1933 to begin in Olivebridge while the entirety of the southern loop road was designated as NY 28A.

=== Maintenance and realignment ===
By the mid-1970s, New York City was struggling to maintain its upstate road network. Annual maintenance costs of the city's 82 miles (132 km) of roads and 26 bridges had grown to $310,000 (equivalent to $1.4 million in 2024). Additionally, one bridge along NY 28A in Traver Hollow was temporarily closed in June 1975 due to safety concerns, a move that ultimately led to a lawsuit between the city and the town of Olive over economic hardship caused by the closure. In October 1975, New York City Environmental Protection Administrator Robert Low requested that NYSDOT assume maintenance of the city's upstate roads, claiming that the state could maintain them in a more efficient and effective manner. The plan was never implemented.

As part of the reservoir's construction, a north–south road was built across the water body, linking Olivebridge on the south bank to Shokan on the northern side. This highway was closed to automotive traffic by New York City in early 2002 following the September 11, 2001 attacks, citing a potential security vulnerability. However, the route was re-opened for traffic that year, and remained open until March 20, 2003, due to a United States Army Corps of Engineers confidential risk assessment, which suggested that the city should close it again to protect the reservoir spillway from sabotage. In March 2007, the town of Olive filed suit against the city of New York in the New York State Supreme Court's Appellate Division for it to be re-opened as a violation of the Water Supply Act of 1905 or to guarantee $5 million (equivalent to $7.27 million in 2024) to reconstruct NY 28A. However, Olive v. City of New York was dismissed by the court on June 18, 2009, as it had surpassed the four-month statute of limitations.

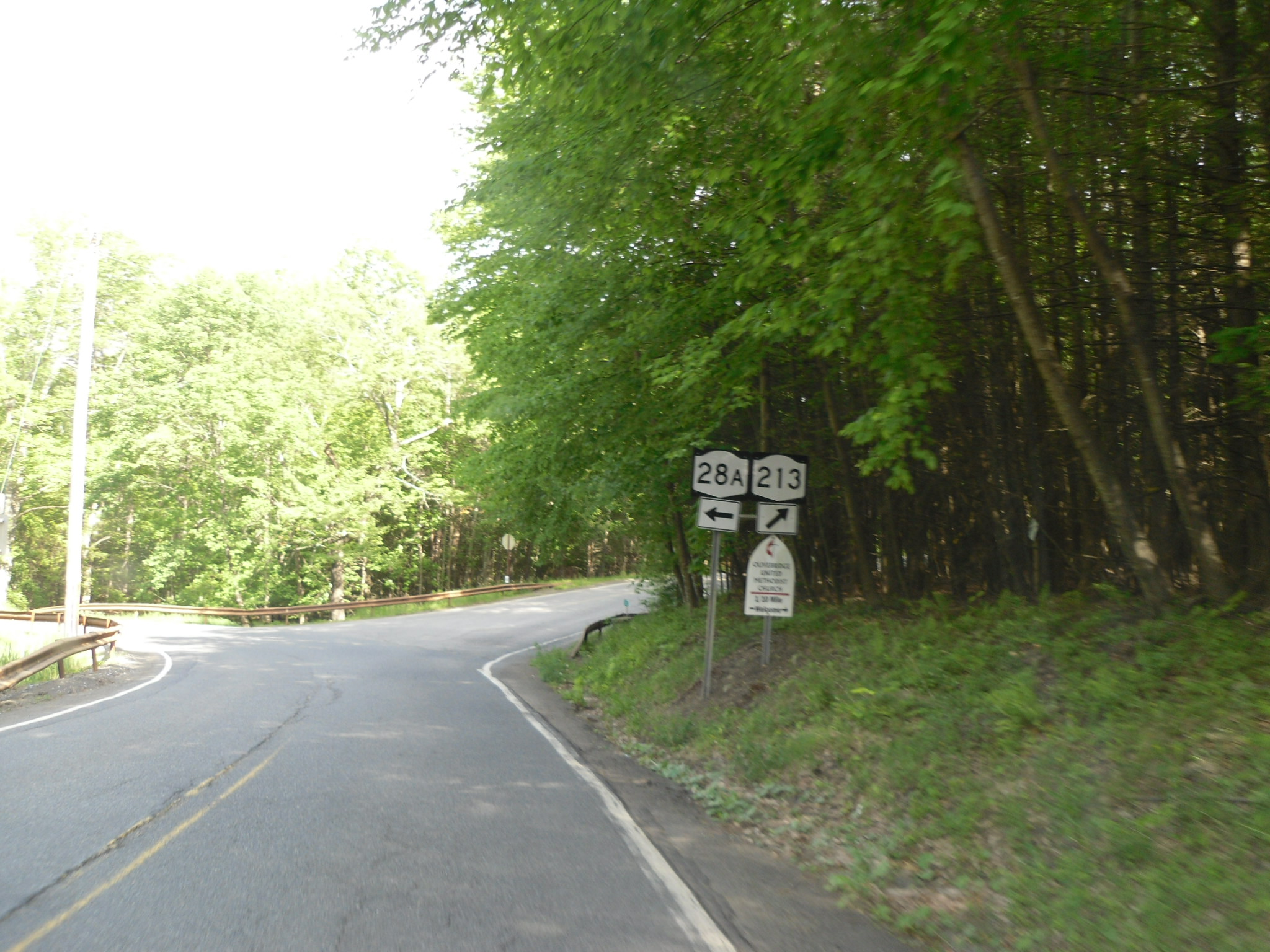
NY 28A and NY 213 intersection May 2010 before it was reconstructed

In the late 2000s, the New York City Department of Environmental Protection began work on a project to eliminate a sharp S-curve in NY 28A between NY 213 and the now-closed cross-reservoir road. The impetus for the project came from residents who wanted the narrow NY 28A improved in lieu of reopening the road. Work on the realignment began in January 2009, but was halted just one month later over environmental and easement issues. Construction resumed on August 12, 2010, after the issues were resolved, and was expected to be completed in December 2011. The project was completed in early August 2012, two years after construction began, with the total cost at $15 million (equivalent to $20.2 million in 2024). As a result, the spillway road and dam was completed and reopened to traffic.

== Major intersections ==
The entire route is in Ulster County.

Location	mi	km	Destinations	Notes
Olive	0.00	0.00	NY 28 – Kingston, West Hurley, Boiceville, Phoenicia	Western terminus; hamlet of Boiceville
Olive	8.67	13.95	NY 213 east	Western terminus of NY 213; hamlet of Olivebridge
Town of Kingston	19.82	31.90	NY 28	Eastern terminus; hamlet of Stony Hollow
1.000 mi = 1.609 km; 1.000 km = 0.621 mi

== See also ==
- New York State Route 55A – Another Upstate route maintained by New York City
