= New York State Route 213 =

State highway in Ulster County, New York, US

New York State Route 213
- Map of Ulster County in eastern New York with NY 213 highlighted in red

Route information
- Maintained by NYSDOT, Ulster County and the city of Kingston
- Length: 27.00 mi (43.45 km)
- Existed: 1930–present

Major junctions
- West end: NY 28A in Olive
- US 209 in Marbletown
- East end: NY 32 in Kingston

Location
- Country: United States
- State: New York
- Counties: Ulster

Highway system
- New York Highways; Interstate; US; State; Reference; Parkways
← NY 212	→ NY 214

New York State Route 213 (NY 213) is a state highway located entirely in Ulster County. It runs from the eastern Catskills to downtown Kingston.

While it is signed as an east–west route, most of its course consists of two segments running in a more north–south direction, giving it a V-shape on the map. The only section of the highway to truly run east–west is a middle segment between its two concurrencies, in the vicinity of High Falls.

== Route description ==
=== Olivebridge to High Falls ===
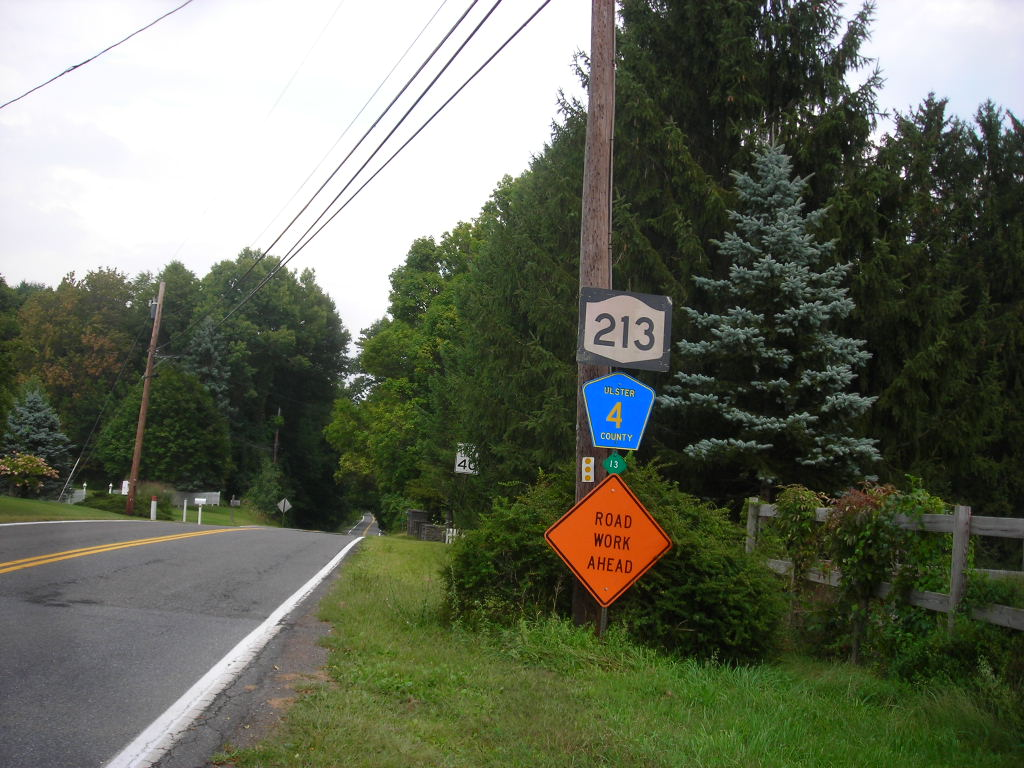
NY 213 and CR 4 in Olive

NY 213 begins at an intersection with NY 28A across from the spillway road for the Ashokan Reservoir in the town of Olive. NY 213 and County Route 4 (CR 4) both proceed southward into the hamlet of Olivebridge as a two-lane residential street. The routes wind their way southward out of Olivebridge and into the hamlet of Davis Corners. In Davis Corners, the routes remain residential before intersecting with CR 2A (Krumville Road). At this junction, NY 213 and CR 4 gain the moniker of Atwood–Olivebridge Road, and upon leaving the Catskill State Park, Atwood Road. After leaving the park, NY 213 and CR 4 continue east as a two-lane woods road and soon entering the town of Marbletown. Just east of Pine Cove Road, NY 213 and CR 4 bend southeast into the hamlet of Atwood.

Through Atwood, NY 213 and CR 4 become residential, paralleling Esopus Creek into an intersection with CR 5 (Tongore Road). NY 213 and CR 4 continue south, crossing through a large field as it progresses southbound. The routes soon bend southwest, intersecting with Peak Road at a four-way intersection. At this junction, NY 213 and CR 4 turn eastward through a large farm section of Marbletown and at the intersection with Pine Bush Road, change monikers to Cooper Street. Now known as Cooper Street, NY 213 and CR 4 enter the hamlet of Stone Ridge. In Stone Ridge, NY 213 intersects with US 209 (Main Street). This intersection serves as the eastern terminus of maintenance by Ulster County and thus the eastern terminus of CR 4.

NY 213 becomes concurrent with US 209 south on Main Street, a two-lane street through downtown Stone Ridge, before leaving a short distance later. The routes bend southwest through Marbletown. NY 213 forks off US 209 a short distance later. NY 213 proceeds southeast through Marbletown as a two-lane rural/residential roadway. A short distance later, NY 213 enters the hamlet of High Falls, where it intersects with CR 1 (Lucas Turnpike). In High Falls, NY 213 crosses over Rondout Creek and intersects with a former alignment of itself. In downtown High Falls, CR 6A (Mohonk Road). After bending northeast, NY 213 leaves High Falls, bypassing Bruceville as it bends northward. Continuing northward, NY 213 crosses Rondout Creek again, entering the town of Rosendale.

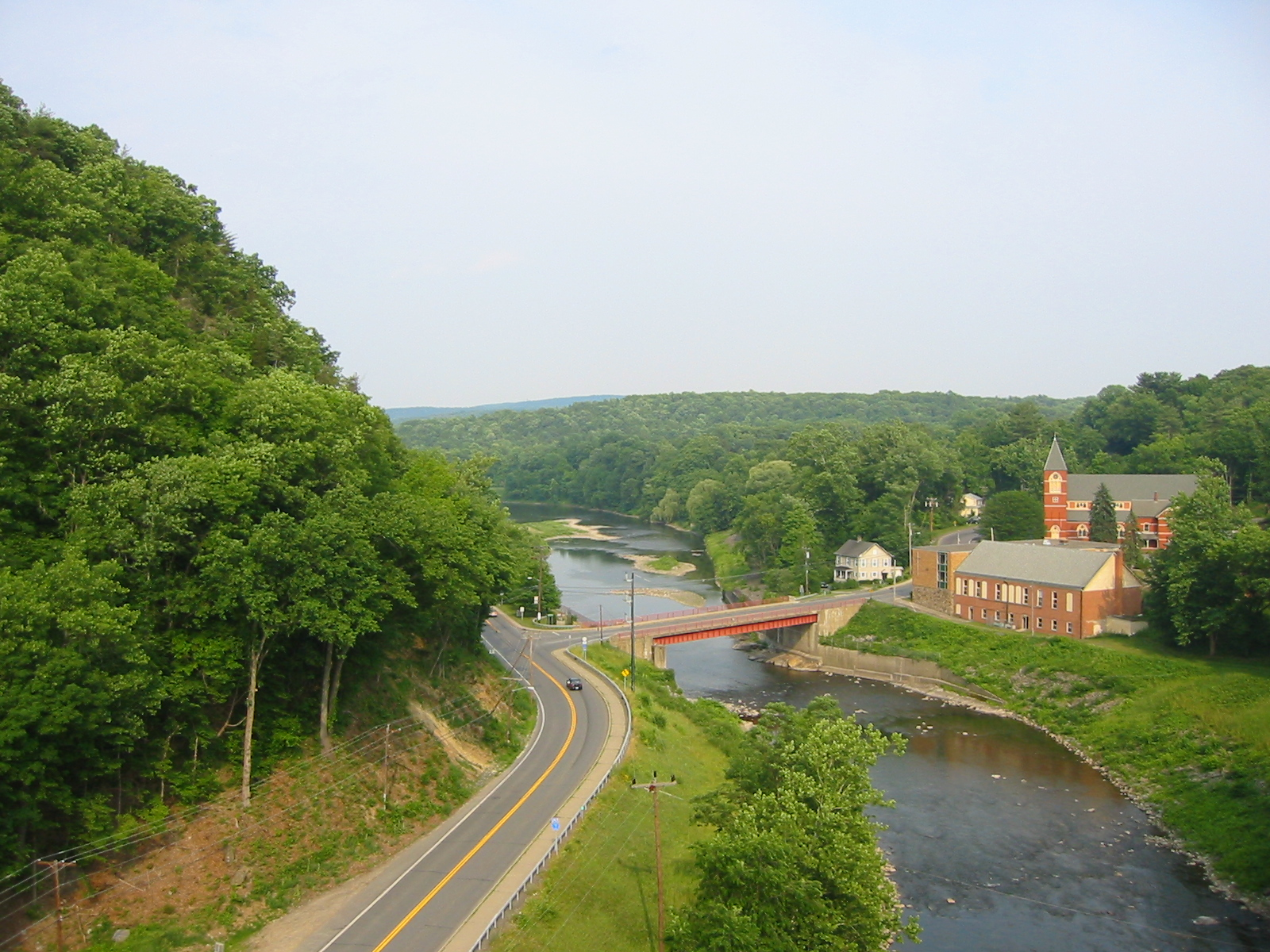
NY 213 eastward toward Rosendale as viewed from the Rosendale trestle

=== Rosendale to Kingston ===
In Rosendale, NY 213 intersects with the southern terminus of CR 26A (Cottekill Road) and becomes a two-lane residential roadway. Paralleling Rondout Creek, NY 213 intersects with the southern terminus of the first segment of CR 7 (Binnewater Road). A short distance after the junction, the Rosendale trestle crosses over NY 213 as it enters downtown Rosendale. In downtown Rosendale, NY 213 becomes a two-lane residential street, bending northeast into a junction with NY 32. At this junction, NY 213 becomes concurrent with NY 32, crosses over Rondout Creek once again, and proceed south through downtown Rosendale. Passing the Town of Rosendale Recreation Center, NY 32 and NY 213 continue through Rosendale as a two-lane residential street. A short distance later, the routes enter the hamlet of Tillson.

After Tillson, NY 32 and NY 213 turn southeast, cross over the Wallkill River in Rosendale and fork at a junction just to the south. NY 213 turns northeast along the Wallkill, crossing under, but not interchanging with, the New York State Thruway (I-87). Passing Perrine's Bridge Park, NY 213 enters the hamlet of Dashville as Main Street, now in the town of Esopus. At Dashville Road, NY 213 turns northward along the Wallkill. The route bends northeast, entering the area of Sturgeon Pool, and entering the hamlet of Rifton. In Rifton, the route is a two-lane residential street, and intersects with the northern terminus of CR 16 (Old Post Road). NY 213 continues north out of Rifton alongside the waterbed, leaving northward through the town of Esopus.

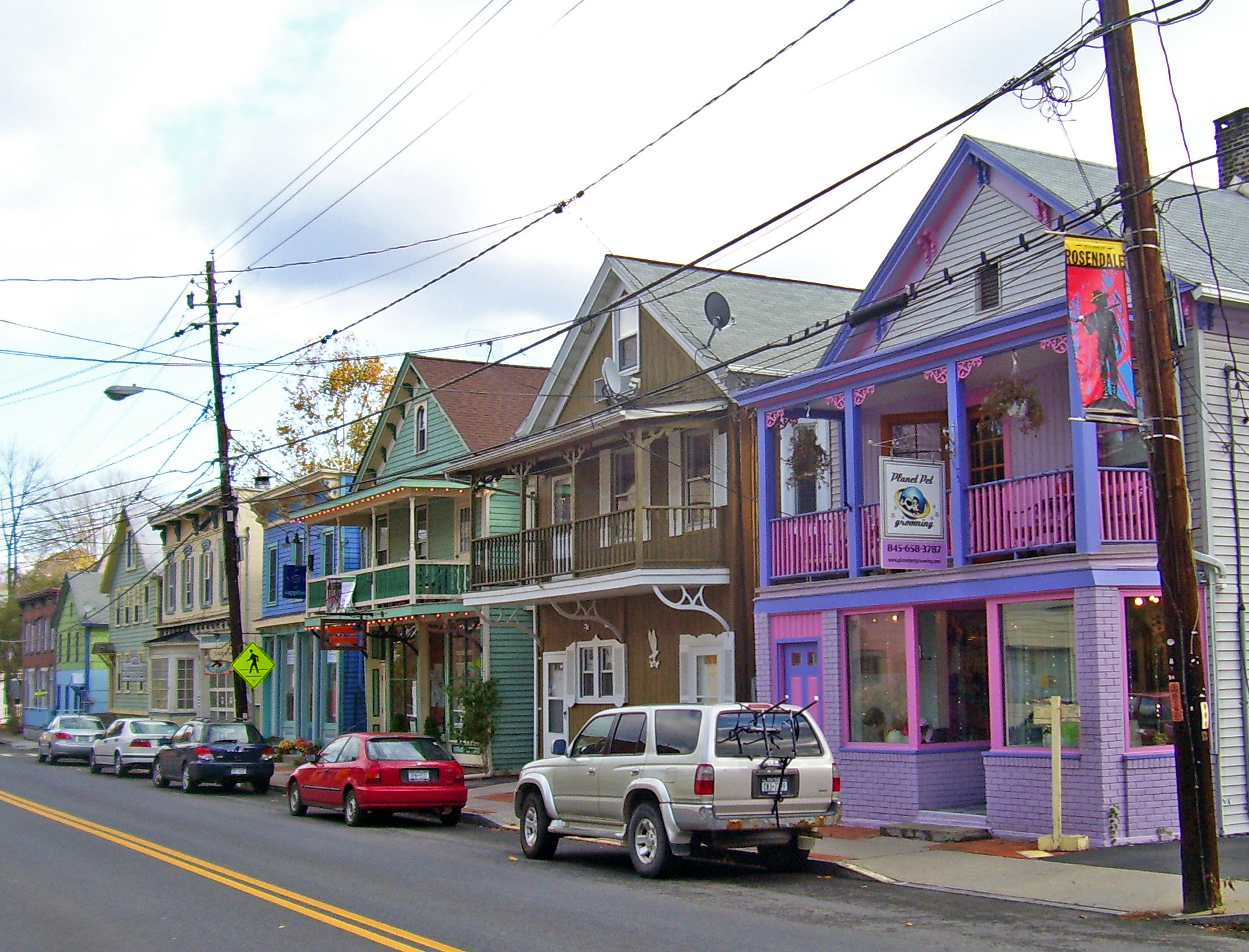
Historic buildings in downtown Rosendale

For a distance, NY 213 remains rural, becoming residential as it enters the hamlet of St. Remy. In St. Remy, NY 213 intersects with CR 24 (Union Center Road). After the junction of CR 24, NY 213 makes a gradual bend to the northwest, entering the hamlet of New Salem. In New Salem, NY 213 intersects with the discontinuous CR 25 (New Salem Road). After crossing over the Rondout, NY 213 intersects with the other section of CR 25, Canal Street. A short distance later, NY 213 enters Eddyville, intersecting with the terminus of CR 28 (Mountain Road). Continuing northeast out of the town of Ulster, NY 213 soon enters the city of Kingston, where maintenance shifts from the state to the city.

In Kingston, NY 213 gains the moniker of Abeel Street, running alongside the Rondout Creek, where it intersects with Wilbur Avenue. NY 213 turns north on Wilbur, a two-lane residential street. Passing west of Wiltwyck Cemetery, NY 213 enters downtown Kingston. In Kingston, NY 213 turns east on Greenkill Avenue, where just before the turn, a remnant of a Wallkill Valley Railroad trestle wall can be seen on the left, then north on South Clinton Avenue a block later. Two blocks after that, NY 213 intersects with NY 32 at Henry Street. NY 32 and NY 213 are concurrent once again, and the routes proceed together for five city blocks, until the junction with Broadway, where NY 213 terminates and NY 32 continues on Broadway.

== History ==
NY 213 was assigned as part of the 1930 renumbering of state highways in New York. Originally, NY 213 began at NY 28 at the west end of the Ashokan Reservoir in Boiceville and followed what is now NY 28A southeastward around the reservoir to Olivebridge. Here, it turned onto its modern alignment and proceeded eastward to Rosendale, initially the junction of NY 213 and NY 376, a north–south connector between Rosendale and Dashville. The route continued northeast from Rosendale on modern NY 32 to Kingston, where it ended in the western portion of the city. At the time, the segment of modern NY 213 between Dashville and Kingston was part of NY 32. NY 213 was truncated in July 1932 to its current western terminus in Olivebridge and rerouted east of Rosendale to follow NY 376 and NY 32 to Kingston. The former alignment of NY 213 north of Rosendale became part of a realigned NY 32.

== Major intersections ==
The entire route is in Ulster County.

Location	mi	km	Destinations	Notes
Olive	0.00	0.00	NY 28A	Western terminus; hamlet of Olivebridge
Marbletown	8.63	13.89	US 209 north – Kingston, SUNY Ulster	West end of US 209 overlap; hamlet of Stone Ridge
Marbletown	9.47	15.24	US 209 south – Accord	East end of US 209 overlap
Rosendale	14.71	23.67	NY 32 north – Kingston	West end of NY 32 overlap; hamlet of Rosendale
Esopus	17.26	27.78	NY 32 south – New Paltz	East end of NY 32 overlap; hamlet of Tillson
Kingston	26.68	42.94	NY 32 south (Henry Street)	West end of NY 32 overlap
Kingston	27.00	43.45	NY 32 north (Broadway)	Continuation north; east end of NY 32 overlap
1.000 mi = 1.609 km; 1.000 km = 0.621 mi: Concurrency terminus

== See also ==
- List of county routes in Ulster County, New York
