= South Mountain (Ulster County, New York) =

Mountain in New York, United States

- Location within New York Location within the United States

Highest point
- Elevation: 2,185 feet (666 m)
- Coordinates: 41°56′57″N 74°17′36″W

Geography
- Location: Olivebridge, New York, U.S.
- Topo map: USGS West Shokan

South Mountain, 2,185 feet in elevation, is a lesser summit in the New York Catskill Mountains massif that includes Ashokan High Point, Mombaccus Mountain and Little Rocky. Its northwest slope descends to Watson Hollow, its southwest slope to South Hollow and its eastern side rises above High Point Mountain Road in the Olive hamlet of West Shokan. Following a 2005 court ruling against the town of Olive, a prominently visible cell phone tower was erected on a patch of private property on the ridge north of the South Mountain summit.
