= Mombaccus Mountain =

Mountain in New York, United States

- Location within New York Location within the United States

Highest point
- Elevation: 2,838 feet (865 m)
- Coordinates: 41°54′35″N 74°18′41″W

Geography
- Location: Samsonville, New York, New York, U.S.
- Topo map: USGS West Shokan

Mombaccus Mountain is located in the Catskill Mountains of New York. To the south, it looms over the hamlet of Samsonville in the town of Olive. Together with Little Rocky and South Mountain, Mombaccus Mountain is part of a massif dominated by Ashokan High Point. Below its north slope is the Kanape Brook trail, an old wagon road that leads to a saddle between Mombaccus and Ashokan High Point. Big Rosy Bone Knob, a lesser summit, lies southwest of Mombaccus Mountain. According to historian DeWitt Davis, Mombaccus was "noted for huckleberries and bears" and bear traps were dug on its slopes.

The placename Mombaccus ("mask of Bacchus" in Greek), was given by Dutch settlers to the area now known as the town of Rochester. It was inspired by a carving of a face (likely the Algonkian bear god Maysingwey) found on a sycamore tree where Rochester Creek (formerly known as Mombaccus Creek) enters Rondout Creek Today, Mombaccus is used as the name of a hamlet within Rochester on County Route 3 and for a tributary of Rochester Creek. The name Mombaccus was not given to the mountain until much later. When the town of Olive was formed, the area south of Mombaccus was known as "Subbeatty Land" and old deeds for properties on its slopes still refer to it as "Subbeatty Mountain."
