= Hanover Mountain =

Mountain in New York, United States

- Location within New York Location within the United States

Highest point
- Elevation: 2,549 feet (777 m)
- Coordinates: 41°57′40″N 74°19′47″W

Geography
- Location: West Shokan, New York, U.S.
- Topo map: USGS West Shokan

Hanover Mountain is a mountain located in the Catskill Mountains of New York west of West Shokan. Little Rocky is located south, and Balsam Cap is located northwest of Hanover Mountain.
