= Big Rosy Bone Knob =

Mountain in New York, United States

Hanover Mountain
- Location within New York Location within the United States

Highest point
- Elevation: 2,221 feet (677 m)
- Coordinates: 41°53′54″N 74°20′42″W

Geography
- Location: West Shokan, New York, U.S.
- Topo map: USGS West Shokan

Big Rosy Bone Knob is a mountain located in the Catskill Mountains of New York southwest of West Shokan. Little Rocky is located north-northeast, and Steiny Hill is located south of Big Rosy Bone Knob.
