= Breath Hill =

Mountain in New York, United States

- Location within New York Location within the United States

Highest point
- Elevation: 2,523 feet (769 m)
- Coordinates: 41°56′11″N 74°21′19″W

Geography
- Location: West Shokan, New York, U.S.
- Topo map: USGS West Shokan

Breath Hill is a mountain located in the Catskill Mountains of New York southwest of West Shokan. Little Rocky is located southeast, and Balsam Cap is located north of Breath Hill.
