= Palentown, New York =

Hamlet in New York, United States

Coordinates: 41°52′44″N 74°19′18″W

Palentown is a hamlet in Ulster County, New York, United States.

Named, like Palenville in Greene County, for a family that ran tanneries in the Catskills in the mid-19th century, Palentown is situated inside the Catskill Park in the northwest part of the town of Rochester. Palentown is located off Ulster County Route 3 (Samsonville Road) just south of the Rochester-Olive town line. The hamlet is northeast of the nearby hamlet of Riggsville and south of the Olive hamlet of Samsonville. It is within the Kerhonkson, New York, ZIP Code.

== Geography ==
Palentown is located at Latitude: 41.87889 : Longitude: -74.32194 (41° 52' 44" North, 74° 19' 19" West). It is located about 1053 ft above sea level. The nearby Catskill Mountains rise higher to about 2600 ft in the Town of Rochester. The Mettacahonts Creek, which originates in the nearby mountains, and several smaller streams flow through Palentown.

== Places of interest ==
- Palentown Cemetery - Final resting place for some area residents, families, and military veterans. It contains graves dating at least from the 1800s.
- Palentown Schoolhouse - Built in ca. 1870 in common school District Number 10. The schoolhouse has been recently restored. It is currently The Palentown Schoolhouse Museum. It was designated a National Historic Landmark on September 15, 1988.
- Former site of Peg Leg Bates' Country Club (1951-1987), a resort run by the famed Black tap dancer.
