= Ashokan High Point =

Mountain in the United States

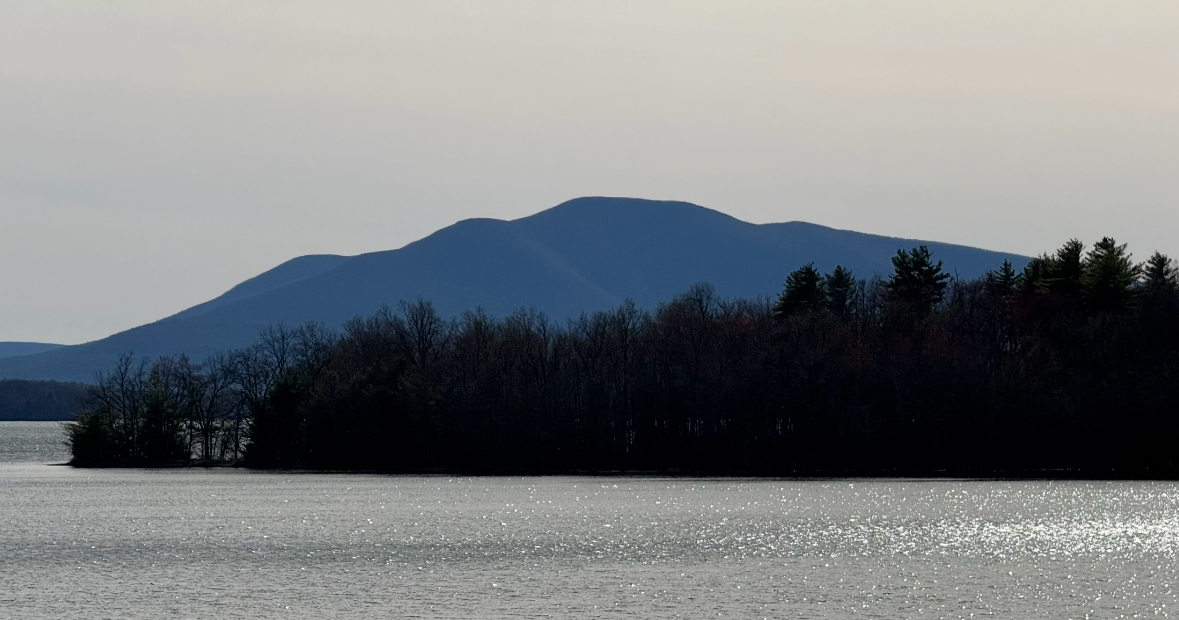
- Ashokan High Point from the Ashokan Rail Trail

Highest point
- Elevation: 3,081 ft (939 m) NAVD 88
- Coordinates: 41°55′29″N 74°17′17″W

Geography
- Location within New York Location within the United States
- Location: Olive, Ulster County, New York, U.S.
- Parent range: Catskill Mountains
- Topo map: USGS West Shokan

Ashokan High Point or High Point is a 3,081 feet (939 m) summit in the Catskill Mountains of New York. High Point is the loftiest part of a massif that includes the adjacent Mombaccus Mountain, Little Rocky and South Mountain. It is also the highest peak in Sundown Wild Forest. The summit can be accessed via the Kanape Brook Trail, which ascends from Ulster County Road 42 to the saddle between High Point and Mombaccus. This trail, named for 19th-century farmer John Canape, was formerly a wagon track connected to the present-day Freeman Avery Road on the south side of the mountain, providing a route between Watson Hollow and Samsonville in the days of the Catskills tanneries. The Gazetteer and Business Directory of Ulster County, N.Y. For 1871-2 referred to the peak as "Shokan Point". It was also known as "Samson," after the Catskill tannery owner for whom Samsonville was named, and is so identified on a 1942 United States Coast and Geodetic Survey benchmark at the summit. Nowadays, Samson Mountain is the name given to a nearby peak above the upper reaches of Rondout Creek.

A lesser summit below the main peak affords an expansive view of the area. It has been called "Little Ashokan," "Little High Point," "Round Mountain," "Ashokan Cobble" or "Samson's Nose".
