= Samsonville, New York =

- Hamlet
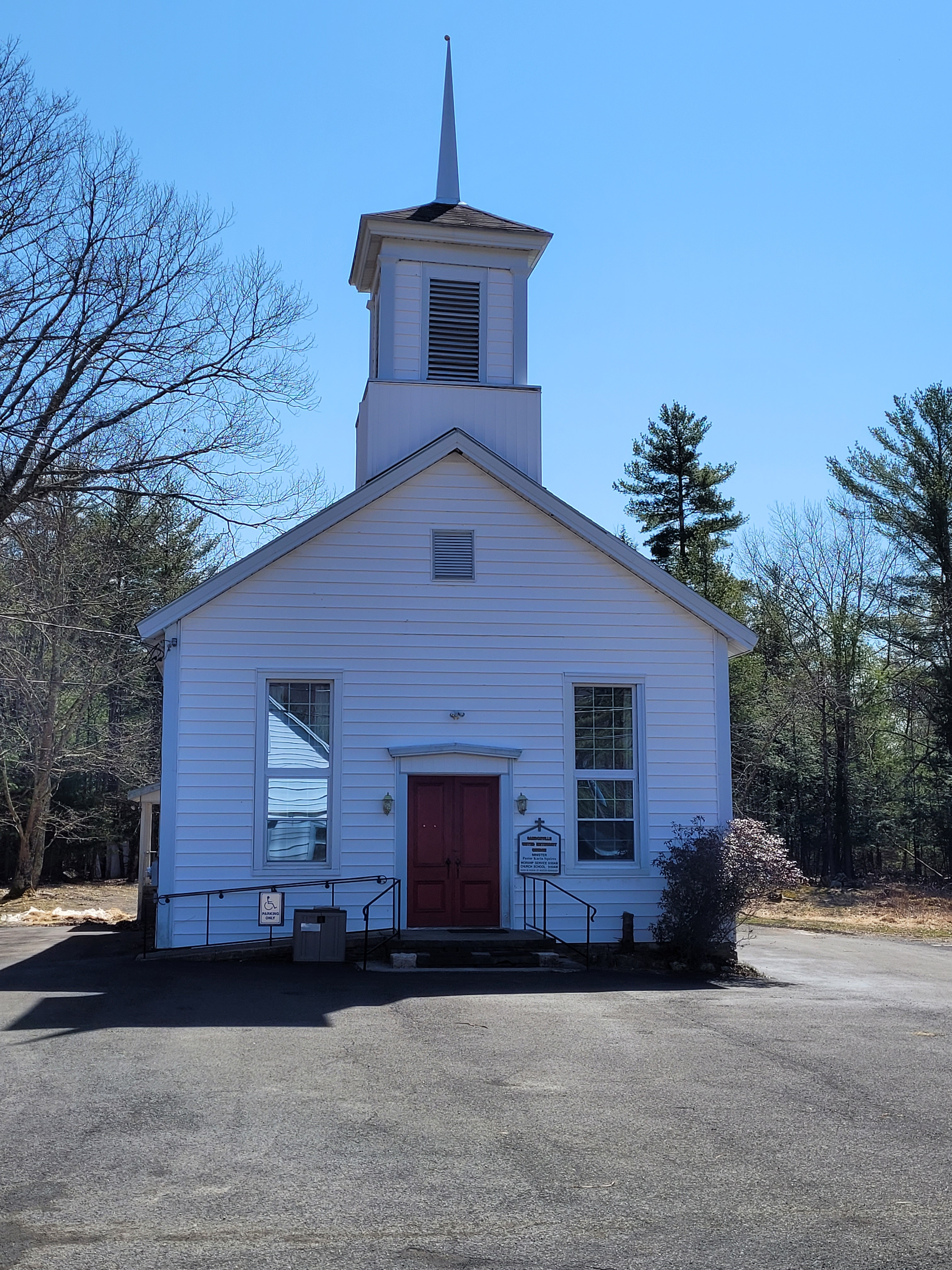
- Samsonville United Methodist Church, built 1873

- Location within New York
- Coordinates: 41°53′15″N 74°17′39″W
- Country: United States
- State: New York
- County: Ulster
- Town: Olive
- Elevation: 856 ft (261 m)
- Time zone: UTC-5 (Eastern (EST))
  - Summer (DST): UTC-4 (EDT)
- GNIS feature ID: 964351

Samsonville is a hamlet in the southwestern part of the town of Olive in Ulster County, New York, United States. Bordered to the north by Mombaccus Mountain and Ashokan High Point, it is within the Catskill Park on the southeastern slopes of the high Catskills.

== Early history ==
Native American hunters made use of a natural rock shelter beneath a cliff in the area now called Samsonville as early as 2000 BC and possibly as late as 1600 AD. Excavations at the site yielded stone blades, potsherds, arrowheads and spear points. The area that includes Samsonville is part of what was once known as Subbeatty land (Mombaccus Mountain was then called Subbeatty Mountain). It was included in the Marbletown Commons portion of the Marbletown Patent granted to three trustees by Queen Anne of England in 1703 through her agent, Viscount Cornbury. When Olive was founded in 1823, this section of Marbletown was transferred to the new town.

Samsonville developed around a tannery established by Stoddard Hammond and the Palen family of tanners in 1831 below a falls on Mettacahonts Creek.

Town historian Vera Van Steenburgh Sickler wrote: "In 1831, Palen and Hammond built a large tannery in (Palentown) Samsonville. In 1850, after passing through other hands, the tannery became the property of Pratt and Samson." The anonymous author of a 1964 note on Samsonville history in the Kingston Daily Freeman wrote that the tannery had been built in 1831 but gave the names of the original owners as "Hammond and Edson" (Stoddard Hammond was a major tannery owner elsewhere in New York and in Pennsylvania).

In 1848, the tannery was sold to Zadock Pratt, with Henry Samson as operating partner. The area around the tannery had been known as "Palentown" but acquired the name of Samsonville, leaving Palentown as the name of the adjacent area of Rochester, Ulster County, New York.

Henry A. Samson

== Henry A. Samson ==
Henry Almanzo Samson, for whom the hamlet was named, was born April 4, 1818, in Woodstock, Connecticut, where he learned the tanning trade. In 1853, having established himself as a wealthy local businessman, he was named a Lieutenant Colonel in the 20th Regiment, New York State Militia and the following year was commissioned Brigadier General, 8th Brigade. In 1853, Zadock Pratt gifted his share of the Samsonville tannery to his son George Watson Pratt. Samson became the sole owner in 1856 and also had an interest in four other tanneries. In 1857, he built a grand Italianate villa at 32 West Chestnut Street in Rondout, New York. General Samson performed his Civil War service in New York state, but raised local troops for the Union: "Employees of the big tannery at Samsonville responded well to the patriotic activities of its owner, General Samson of Rondout. 43 of these sturdy men from the back country enlisted in the old 20th and 27 more entered the 120th the following summer." In addition to his tannery interests, Samson was a member of the Board of Directors of the First National Bank of Rondout and the First National Bank of Kingston, one of the original trustees of the Rondout Savings Bank, a founding officer of the Rondout and Oswego Rail Road Company and president of the Washington Ice Company. He died on February 9, 1869, and is interred in Montrepose Cemetery in Rondout, now a district of Kingston.

The name of Samson Mountain, which stands above the upper reaches of Rondout Creek, commemorates Samson the tanner. The peak now known as Ashokan High Point, which looms over Samsonville, was also called Samson by older residents, and is so named on a 1942 United States Coast and Geodetic Survey benchmark at the summit. "Little Ashokan" (also known as "Round Mountain" or "Ashokan Cobble"), a lesser summit below High Point, was known locally as "Samson's Nose."

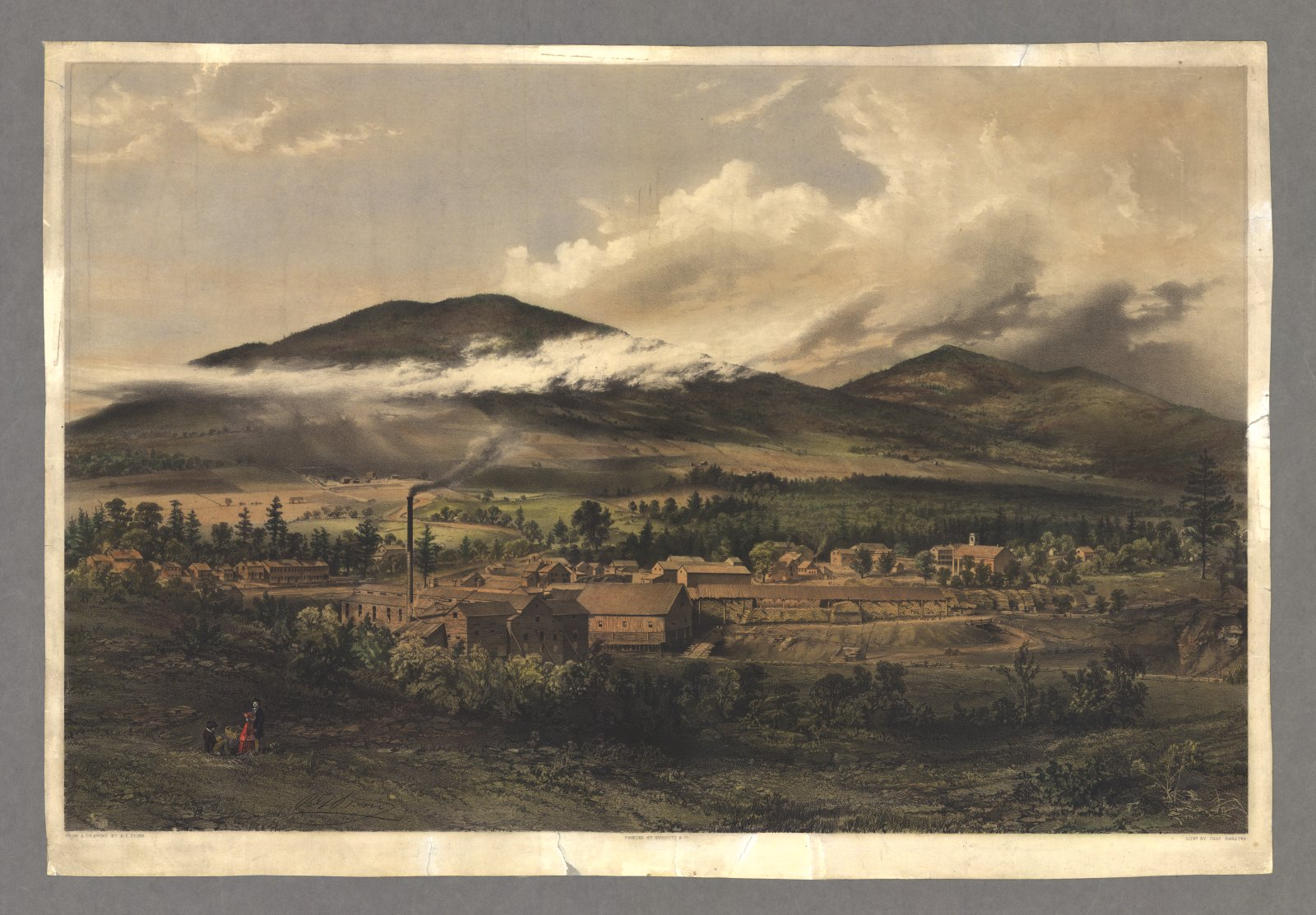
View of Samsonville in 1855

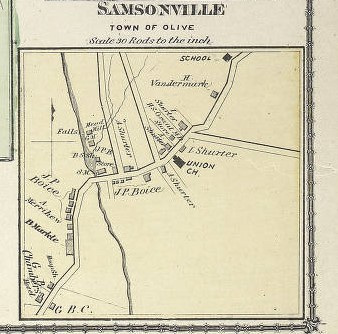
Atlas of Ulster County, New York, From Recent and Actual Surveys and Records, 1875

== "The Most Important Town in the Entire Catskill Mountains" ==
Historian Harry Albert Haring wrote that, in its heyday, "Samsonville was the most important town in the entire Catskill Mountains, - its population was the largest, its payroll the greatest." The Civil War created a high demand for the hemlock-tanned sole leather that was the Samsonville tannery's main product. After the war, demand declined, as did the supply of hemlock bark. As bark cutters wiped out the local hemlocks, all the Catskill tanneries eventually closed. Historian David Stradling wrote: “In many locations...when the tanneries closed, the settlements around them closed too. Samsonville, the site of General Henry A. Samson’s large tannery, was once an important town. In 1854, the Samson Tannery employed seventy men, processing a remarkable 31,000 hides a year. By 1930, Haring declared Samsonville nearly a ghost town; it had never found a replacement of the jobs lost when the tannery closed.”

In 1871, an Ulster County directory noted that Samsonville "contains a church, a hotel, three stores, a grist mill, a saw mill, a tannery and about 100 inhabitants." At that time, tanning was still being done in Samsonville by William V.N. Boice & Sons. In 1873, however, the tannery burned down (not for the first time) and was not rebuilt. In 1880, historian Nathaniel Bartlett Sylvester still identified Samsonville as a "thickly-settled neighborhood" but added: "Since the abandonment of the tannery business the importance of the place has declined." Not all was gone: "There are two stores, one by Pratt Shurter and one by Peter Barringer, – Mr. Shurter is also postmaster, – a grist mill, owned by Anthony Shurter. There is also a saw-mill at this place, and a blacksmith."

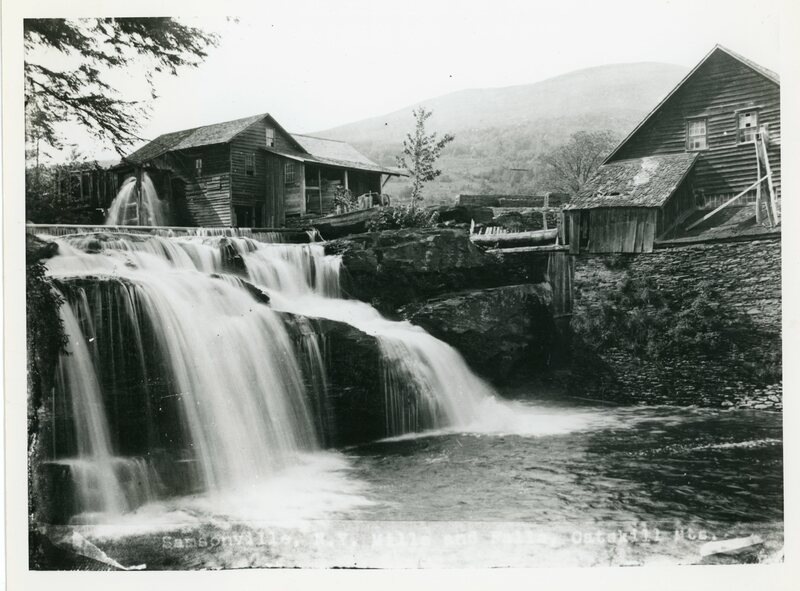
Shurter Mill, 1910

== The Shurter Mills ==
The first known resident of Samsonville was 1812 War veteran John "Captain Jack" Shurter, who served as one of the original Town Officers when Olive was founded in 1823 and as Justice of the Peace. The mills he and his descendants operated for six generations at the top of the Samsonville Falls on Mettacahonts ("Markham") Creek preceded Samson's tanning business and long survived it. The Shurter grist mill ground local buckwheat, wheat and corn, as well as clover for animal feed, until a flood knocked it off its foundation in 1928. That mill ("where the grain is ground, with a rumbling sound, that feeds all Samsonville") was celebrated in "The Tall Pine Tree" ("The Samsonville Song") collected in the 1950s from local residents Celia Krom Kelder and Mary Avery.

The Shurters also operated saw mills that produced excelsior and, later, headings (barrel tops) and shingles, and that side of the business continued after the loss of the grist mill, with a gasoline-powered engine supplementing the sometimes unreliable water power. A turbine installed between the mills provided electric power to Samsonville well before it was available in other remote Catskills communities.

== Post-tannery years ==
After the tannery era, bluestone quarrying, timber harvesting and shaving hoops from saplings ("hoop poles") to bind the barrels that held Rosendale cement, as well as growing oats and hay, provided employment and income for a reduced population. In 1895, a Rand McNally Atlas gave Samsonville's population as 111. The 1940 census records counted 115 persons in Samsonville.

The tannery, mills, stores, hotel and schoolhouse that once stood in Samsonville are gone, as is Abey Kelder's saloon, celebrated in the local folk song "Kintey Coy at Samsonville" The post office, opened in 1849 with Henry Samson as the first postmaster, closed in 1965, when there were only 50 postal patrons left in the town. A handful of older buildings remain, most notably the Samsonville United Methodist Church, built in 1873. That same year, the Reformed Church of Samsonville, founded in 1851, was taken down and relocated to nearby Krumville. Tetta's Market, a gas station, convenience store, pizzeria and former tire store operated since 1952 by four generations of an Italian-American family, is the hamlet's major commercial business.

Public school students in Samsonville are in the Onteora Central School District, which includes Bennett Elementary, Onteora Middle and Onteora High School in the Olive hamlet of Boiceville and an elementary school in the neighboring town of Woodstock.

Since 1954, Samsonville and Krumville have been served by the volunteers of Olive Fire Department Company No. 4.

== Notable people ==
- Sufjan Stevens, singer-songwriter
- Sara Lee, bass player, singer, and songwriter
- Larry Shurter, midget car racing champion
