= Ashokan Reservoir =

Reservoir in Ulster County, New York

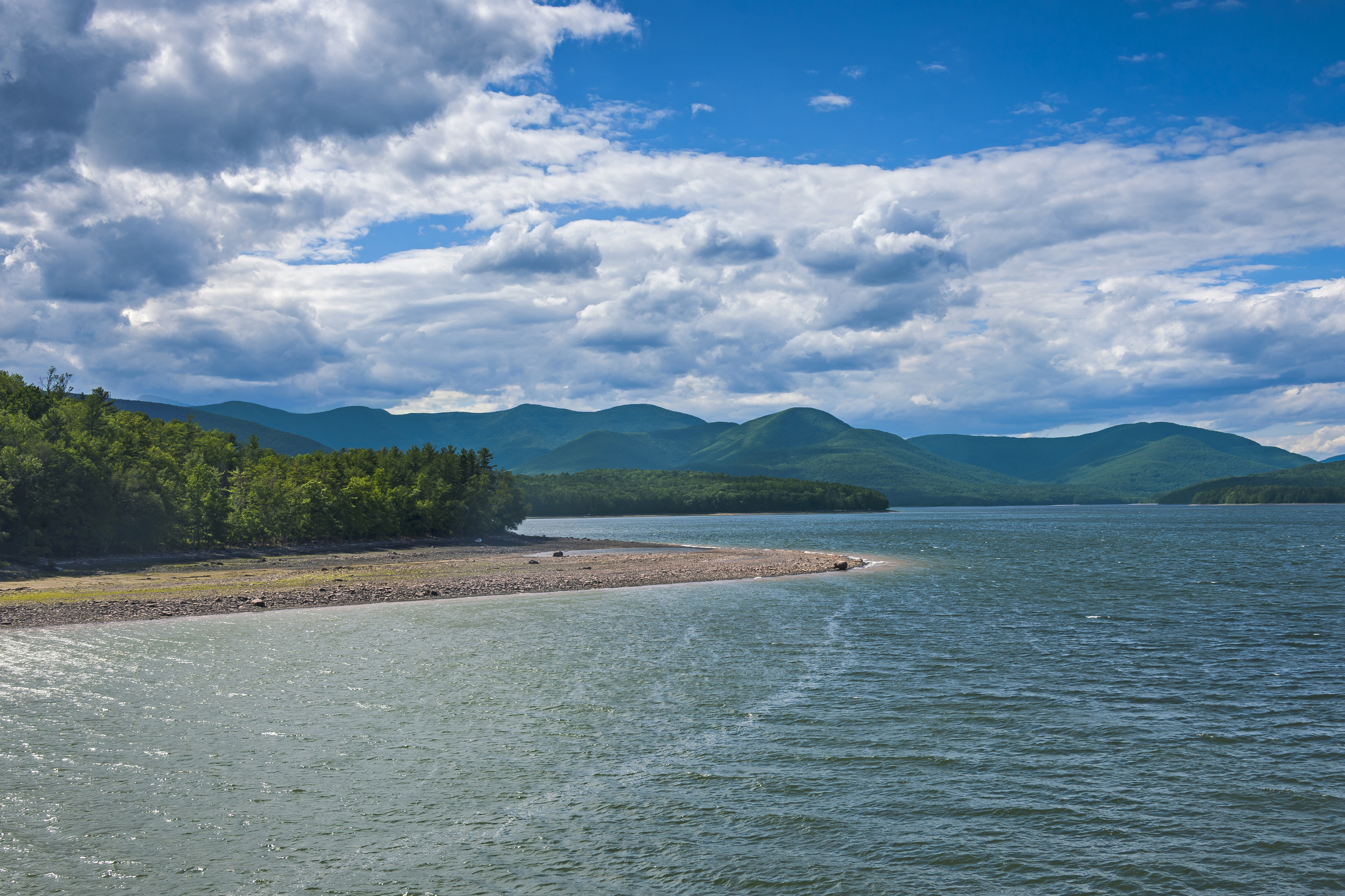
- Ashokan Reservoir in July 2016

- Location within New York Location within the United States
- Location: Ulster County, New York, United States
- Coordinates: 41°57′N 74°13′W
- Type: Reservoir
- Primary inflows: Esopus Creek
- Primary outflows: Esopus Creek
- Basin countries: United States
- Max. length: 12 mi (19 km)
- Max. width: 1 mi (2 km)
- Surface area: 8,300 acres (3,400 ha)
- Average depth: 46 ft (14 m)
- Max. depth: 190 ft (58 m)
- Water volume: 122.9 billion US gal (465 million m^{3})
- Shore length^{1}: 40 mi (60 km)
- Surface elevation: 585 ft (178 m)
- ^{1} Shore length is not a well-defined measure.

The Ashokan Reservoir (/əˈʃoʊkæn/; Iroquois for "place of fish") is a reservoir in the New York City water supply system in Ulster County, New York. It receives the waters of Schoharie Reservoir, and together they provide the flow of the Catskill Aqueduct, which mixes with water from the Delaware Aqueduct at the Kensico Reservoir in Westchester County, New York, and after settling continues into the Hillview Reservoir in Yonkers for distribution in New York City.

Ashokan Reservoir lies at the eastern end of the Catskill Park, and at 190 feet (58 m) near the dam at the former site of Bishop Falls is the New York City system's deepest reservoir.

== History ==
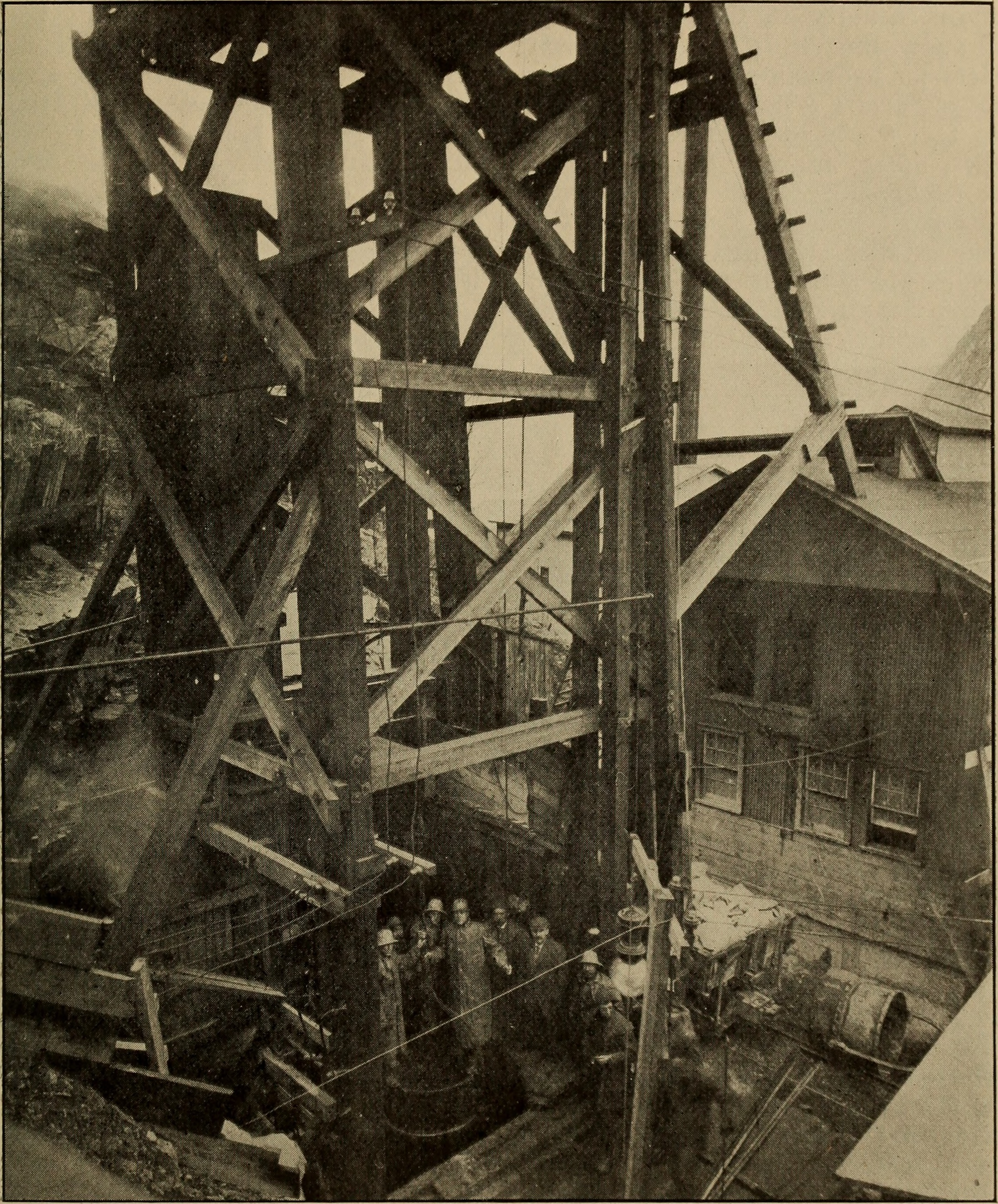
Test shaft for the Catskill Aqueduct; numerous test shafts were also dug for construction of the Ashokan Reservoir (c. 1905-1910, published 1911)

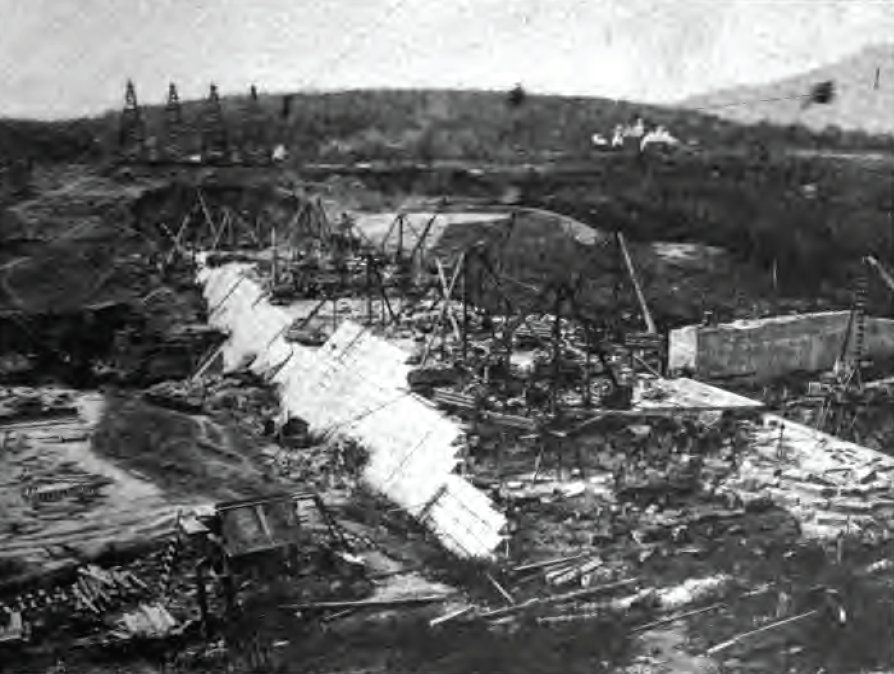
Olivebridge Dam under construction as part of the Ashokan Reservoir, c. 1910

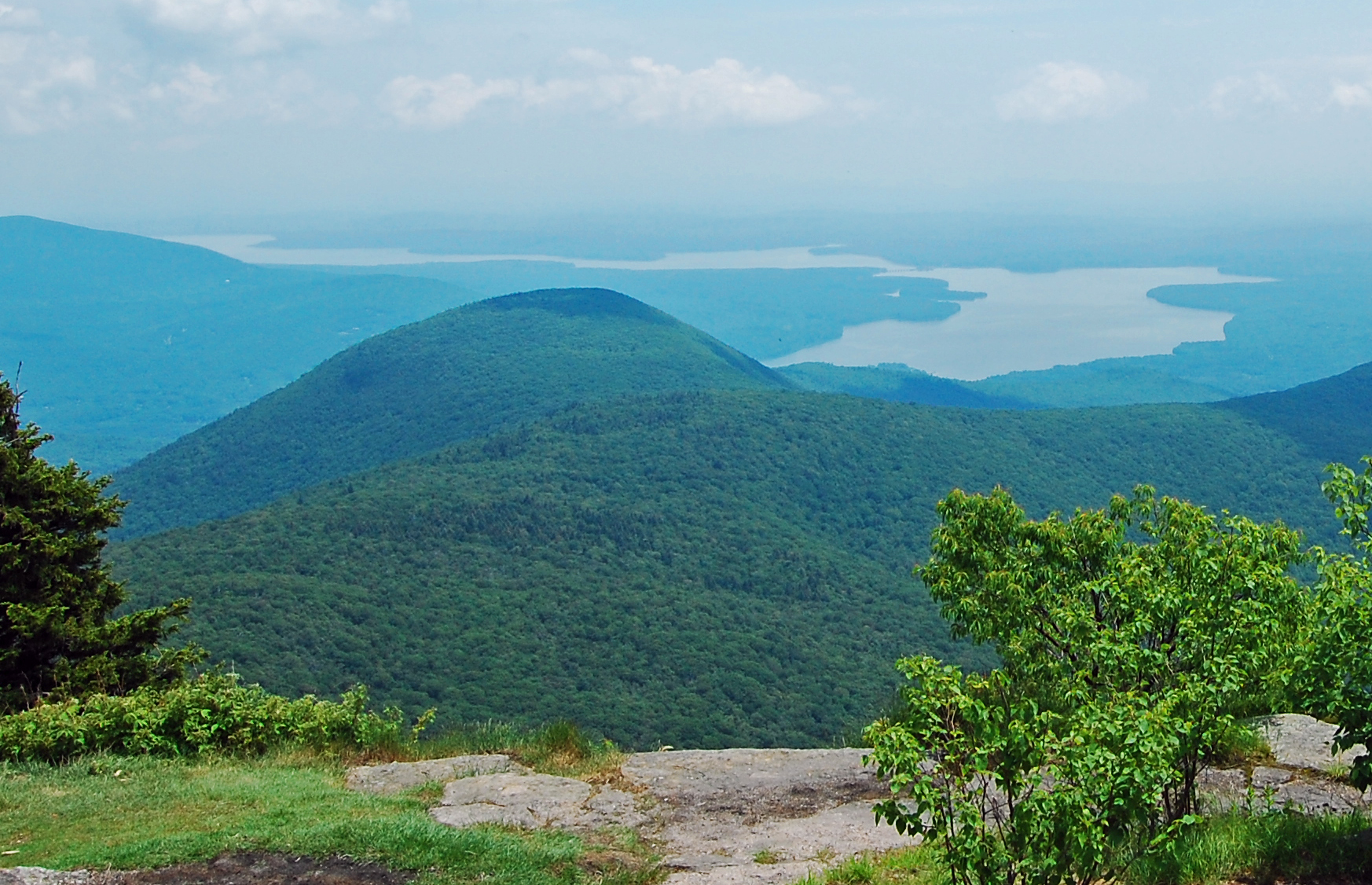
The reservoir seen from the summit of Wittenberg Mountain with Samuel's Point in the foreground

New York City turned to the Catskill Mountains for water in the early 20th century after discovering that a group of speculators calling itself the Ramapo Water Company had bought up riparian rights to many water sources further south in Rockland, Orange and Ulster counties. The Catskills were more desirable, as state-owned Forest Preserve land in the region could not, under the state constitution, be sold to any other party. A recent amendment to that section of the state constitution also allowed up to 3 percent of the total Forest Preserve land to be flooded for reservoirs.

In 1905 the New York State Legislature enacted legislation that created the New York City Board of Water Supply and allowed the city to acquire lands and build dams, reservoirs and aqueducts in the Catskills. The result was the construction of the Schoharie and Ashokan reservoirs of the Catskill Aqueduct, and the four reservoirs to the south that supply the Delaware Aqueduct.

Residents of the area to be flooded for construction of the Ashokan Reservoir did not take kindly to the idea, and fought eminent domain proceedings. They were aided by local lawyers familiar with the troubled history of Catskill land claims. Local opponents of the reservoir cast doubt on its soundness, claiming that even as one of the largest reservoirs in the world at the time it could never hold enough water for its needs; when it was filled from 1912 to 1914 they were silenced. Still, it would be 1940 before the last land claims were settled.

The Ashokan Reservoir was constructed between 1907 and 1915, by the New York City Board of Water Supply, by impounding the Esopus Creek. Numerous test shafts were dug to determine the stability of the area's sub-surface geology to ensure both the impermeability of the completed reservoir and holding strength of its various levees, tunnels, dikes, and dam. Thousands of acres of farmland were submerged. The impoundment covered 12 communities located in a valley where farming, logging, and quarrying prevailed. Approximately 2,000 residents were displaced, and roads and anything that couldn't be moved were either torn down or abandoned. Nearly twelve and a half miles (20.1 km) of a local railroad line (the Ulster and Delaware Railroad) was moved and cemeteries were relocated. The area that became the West Basin of the reservoir contained 504 dwellings, nine blacksmith shops, 35 stores, 10 churches, 10 schools, seven sawmills and a gristmill. Several of these communities were re-established in nearby locations.

The dam was constructed mainly by local laborers, as well as African-Americans and Italian immigrants, who also did the job of razing most of the trees and buildings in the area. Fights would often break out in the labor camps where the crews would eat and sleep, so a police force, which would later become the New York City Department of Environmental Protection (NYCDEP) Police, was established to keep peace. The dam was constructed with Rosendale cement, which at the time was the world's strongest. When the dam was completed, giant steam whistles blew for one hour, signaling to people in the valley to evacuate immediately.

Some relocated communities survive along the reservoir's banks, including West Shokan, Olivebridge, Ashokan, and Shokan. Most, including Brown's Station, are remembered in historical markers along routes 28 and 28A.

== Statistics ==
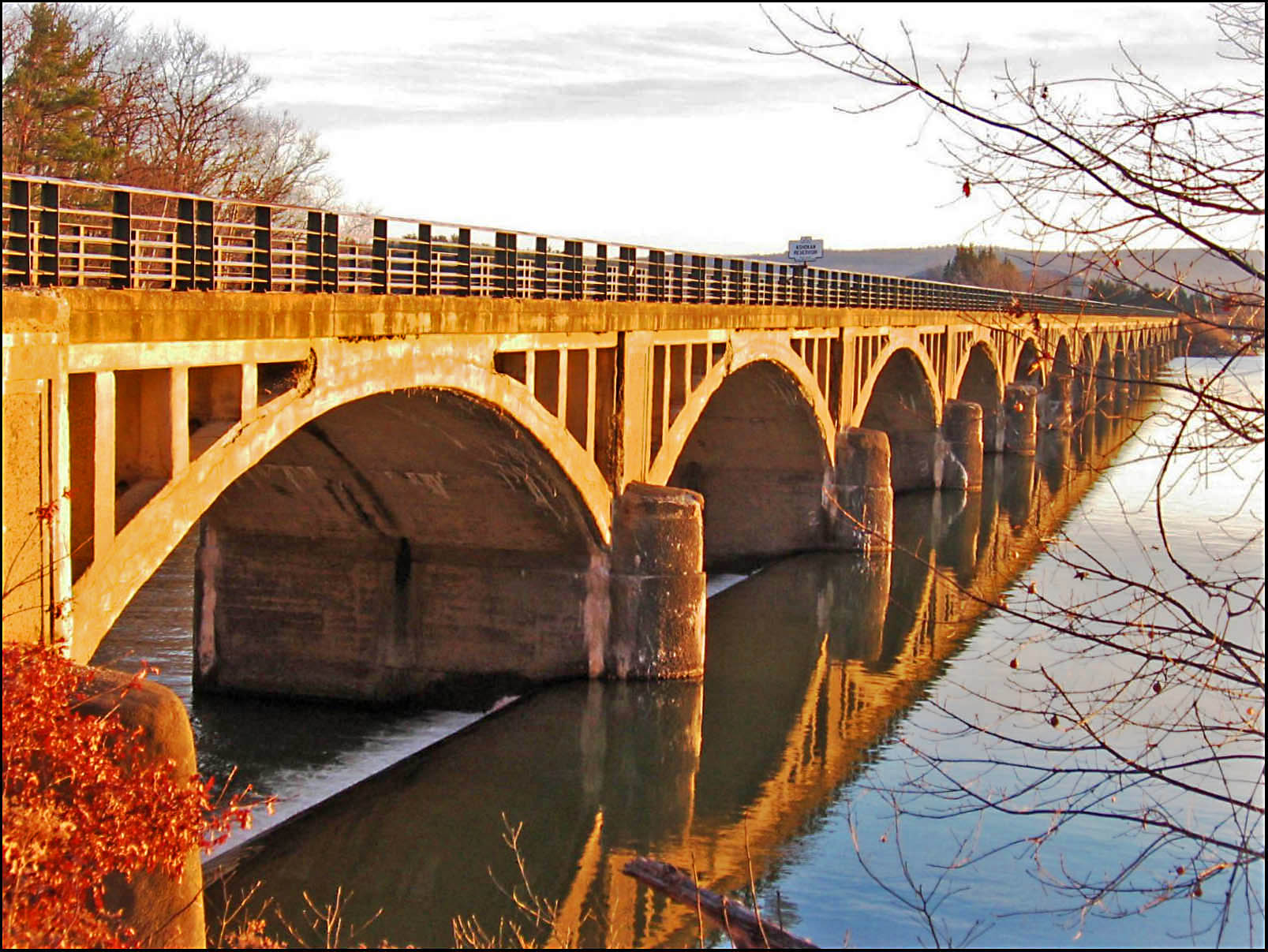
The causeway at the dividing line between the basins, seen from the west basin

The Ashokan Reservoir is fed by its 255 mi^{2} (660 km^{2}) watershed, and absorbs the waters of the 17.6×10^{9} US gal (67,000,000 m^{3}) Schoharie Reservoir via the 16 mi (26 km) Shandaken Tunnel, which empties into the Esopus Creek 11 miles (18 km) upstream of Ashokan. Ashokan is the oldest New York City–owned reservoir in the Catskill Mountains, being placed into service in 1915. It is located at the eastern end of Ulster County, about 13 miles (21 km) west of Kingston, New York, and approximately 93 miles (150 km) north of New York City. One of New York City's largest according to its surface area and volume, the reservoir covers 8,300 acres (3,400 ha), can hold 122.9 billion US gallons (465,000,000 m^{3}) of water at full capacity; it is also the city's deepest reservoir, at over 190 feet (58 m) at its deepest point.

The reservoir is encircled by Routes 28 and 28A, along with many relocated villages. It is separated into two basins by a causeway carrying Reservoir Road. Thanks to a weir integrated into the causeway water does not pass freely between the two basins, and the eastern basin, which borders the relocated villages of Ashokan, Glenford, and West Hurley, along with the non-relocated village of Stony Hollow, is seven inches lower than the western basin. The western basin borders the relocated villages of Boiceville, Brodhead, Olive, Olivebridge, Shokan, and West Shokan. There is also an abandoned road that runs along the spillway of the reservoir, where water runs back into the Esopus Creek by Olivebridge.

Water from the Ashokan flows into Olivebridge, New York, and enters the 92-mile (148 km) Catskill Aqueduct, which empties into the Kensico Reservoir on the east bank of the Hudson River just north of White Plains. There it mixes with water from the Delaware Aqueduct and the Kensico watershed, and after settling continues into the Hillview Reservoir in Yonkers for distribution in New York City.

== Permitted activities ==
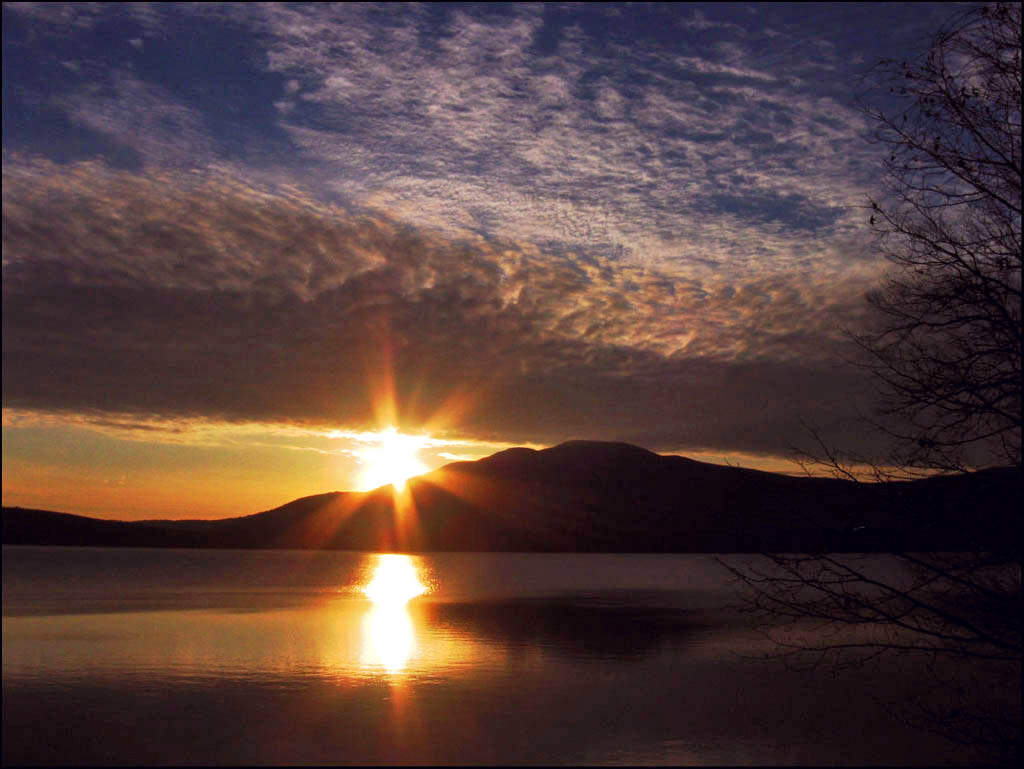
Sunset over Ashokan High Point, a nearby mountain that provides a scenic backdrop to the reservoir

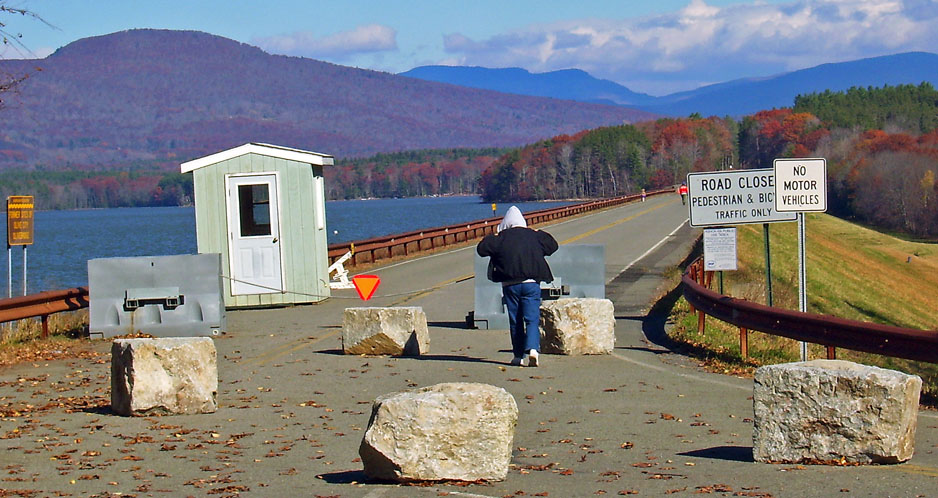
The south end of the closed spillway road

To protect the water system, reservoir, dam, and users, only limited activities are permitted around the reservoir property, including fishing and logging. A special license is required for each. Gasoline-powered watercraft are prohibited.

Pine and spruce trees were planted around the banks at the time of dam and lake construction to prevent erosion. It was also believed by engineers of the time that broad-leaved deciduous trees polluted the water with nutrients more so than conifers.

After the September 11 attacks, the city and state decided to permanently close the spillway road to vehicular traffic as a security precaution. This has added a great deal more traveling time and distance for those on the south side of the reservoir to reach locations to the north. The city compensates the local school district for the extra fuel costs its buses have incurred. The Reservoir Road causeway, however, is still open.

In the late 2010s the former Catskill Mountain Railroad tracks on the north side of the reservoir, from West Hurley to Boiceville, were converted into the Ashokan Rail Trail. The 11.5-mile (18.5 km) path is open for public use by non-motorized means (except wheelchairs) without a permit. The Glenford and Woodstock dikes, two open sections near the eastern end, provide views of the reservoir and surrounding mountains.

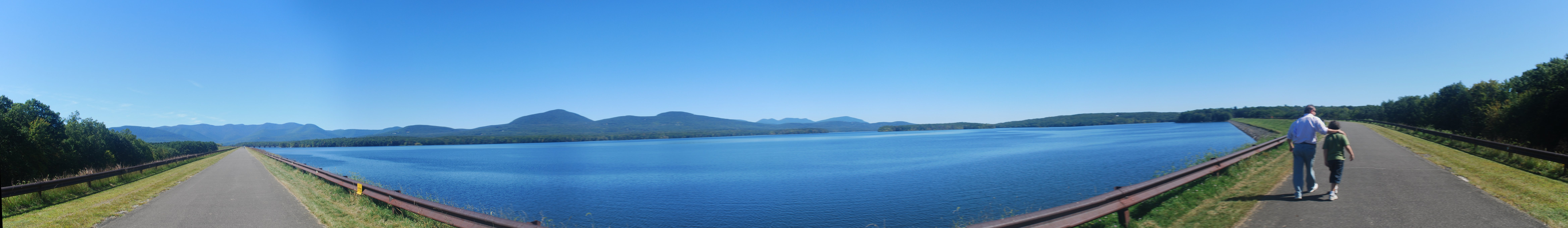
Panorama of Ashokan Reservoir from the south

== See also ==
- Ashokan Center
- Ashokan Farewell
- List of reservoirs and dams in New York
