= Krumville, New York =

Coordinates: 41°53′05″N 74°14′33″W

- Hamlet
- Nickname: Kromville
- Interactive map of Krumville, New York
- Postal code: 12461

Krumville (also Kromville) is a hamlet in the southeastern corner of the town of Olive in Ulster County, New York, United States. It takes its name from one of the most prominent of the early Dutch families who settled the area. Krumville is bordered on the northwest by the Olive hamlet of Samsonville, on the north by the hamlet of Olivebridge, on the southeast by the town of Marbletown and on the southwest by the town of Rochester. It lies at an elevation of 774 feet (236 m) above sea level.

The major commercial business in Krumville is the Country Inn, a bed-and-breakfast/restaurant in what was once known as the Deer Park Falls House, a long-time boarding house and inn. The Deer Park (or Deerhaven) is a long, low gorge that drains into Beaver Lake and Beaverdam Creek below the Deer Park Falls. The center of the hamlet is the intersection of Ulster County Route 2, which connects Kripplebush and Samsonville, and County Route 2A, also known as the Krumville Road or Krumville-Davis Corners Road. The Krumville Reformed Church was located nearby. The building was originally located in Samsonville but was taken down and rebuilt in Krumville in 1873. That church burned down in 1946. The former Krumville schoolhouse was converted into a replacement church dedicated in 1955. The church conducted its final service in 2011.

Krumville once had its own Post Office but now shares the ZIP code 12461 with neighboring Olivebridge. The U.S. Postal Service recognizes Krumville as a valid address within that ZIP.

Krumville is mentioned in Spalding Gray's Swimming to Cambodia and Terrors of Pleasure.

It also is the song title of one of the tracks on Oneohtrix Point Never's 2023 album Again.
