= Little Rocky =

Mountain in New York, United States

- Location within New York Location within the United States

Highest point
- Elevation: 3,008 feet (917 m)
- Coordinates: 41°55′07″N 74°19′56″W

Geography
- Location: West Shokan, New York, U.S.
- Topo map: USGS West Shokan

Little Rocky is a mountain located in the Catskill Mountains of New York. It is part of a massif that includes Ashokan High Point, Mombaccus Mountain and South Mountain.There are two summits, the higher of which is known as Southeast Little Rocky. Hanover Mountain is located north, Breath Hill is located northwest, and Big Rosy Bone Knob is located southwest of Little Rocky.
