= Samson Mountain =

Mountain in New York, United States

- Location within New York Location within the United States

Highest point
- Elevation: 2,808 feet (856 m)
- Coordinates: 41°54′37″N 74°24′09″W

Geography
- Location: Sundown Wild Forest, Ulster County, New York, U.S.
- Topo map: USGS Peekamoose Mountain

Samson Mountain is a mountain located in Sundown Wild Forest in the Catskill Mountains of New York. It stands above the Peekamoose Road (Ulster County Route 42) and the upper course of Rondout Creek.Van Wyck Mountain is located northwest and Bangle Hill is located west-southwest of Samson Mountain. The mountain was named for General Henry A. Samson, operator of a tannery in nearby Samsonville.
