= Boiceville, New York =

Hamlet in the United States

Coordinates: 42°00′18″N 74°15′58″W

Boiceville is a hamlet in the town of Olive, New York, United States. Located at the intersection of New York State Route 28 and New York State Route 28A, Boiceville is within Catskill State Park.

Boiceville was named after Lemuel Boice (died in Boiceville, 1899), who established a tannery in the town. Members of the Boice family owned tanneries, bluestone quarries, stores, farms, lumber businesses and mills in Olive for many years. Boiceville was relocated due to the construction of the Ashokan Reservoir. The current commercial center of the town is subject to severe flooding during exceptionally powerful storms. Some businesses have accepted buyouts from the New York City Department of Environmental Protection. The future of others is in doubt.

The Emile Brunel Studio and Sculpture Garden was listed on the National Register of Historic Places in 1999.

== Education ==
Onteora Central School District operates the public schools in Boiceville, including Onteora High School, Onteora Middle School, and Bennett Elementary School.
