= Shokan, New York =

- CDP
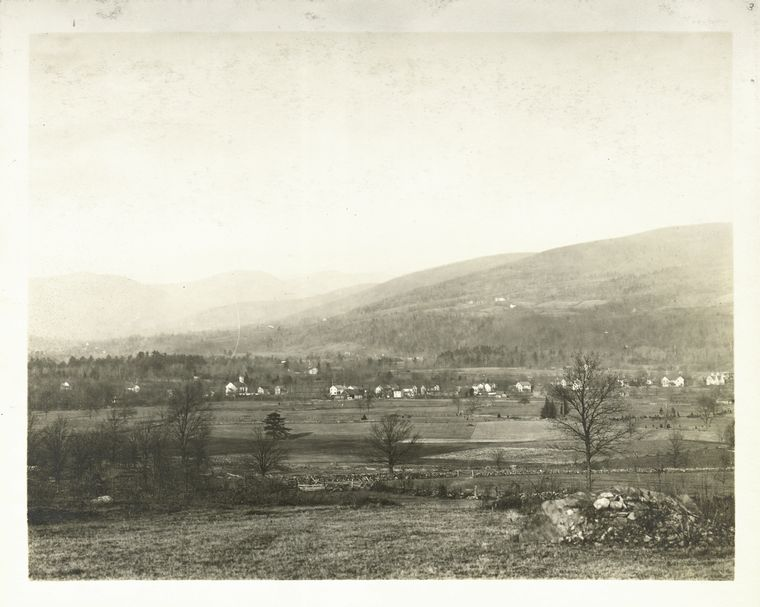
- Shokan in 1906

- Location in Ulster County and the state of New York.
- Coordinates: 41°58′22″N 74°12′56″W
- Country: United States
- State: New York
- County: Ulster
- Town: Olive

Area
  - Total: 3.89 sq mi (10.08 km^{2})
  - Land: 3.89 sq mi (10.08 km^{2})
  - Water: 0 sq mi (0.00 km^{2})
- Elevation: 709 ft (216 m)

Population (2020)
  - Total: 1,075
  - Density: 276.3/sq mi (106.67/km^{2})
- Time zone: UTC-5 (EST)
  - Summer (DST): UTC-4 (EDT)
- ZIP code: 12481
- Area code: 845
- FIPS code: 36-67081
- GNIS feature ID: 0965144

Shokan is a hamlet (and census-designated place) located in the town of Olive in Ulster County, New York, United States, within the Catskill Park. The population was 1,075 at the 2020 census.

== History ==
It was relocated to its present site in the early 20th century after the construction of Ashokan Reservoir on the land it originally occupied.

The Olive and Hurley Old School Baptist Church was listed on the National Register of Historic Places in 1998.

== Geography ==
Shokan is located at 41°58′22″N 74°12′56″W.

According to the United States Census Bureau, the CDP has a total area of 3.9 square miles (10 km^{2}), all land.

== Demographics ==
Historical population
Census	Pop.	Note	%±
2000	1,252		—
2010	1,183		−5.5%
2020	1,075		−9.1%
U.S. Decennial Census

As of the census of 2000, there were 1,252 people, 496 households, and 344 families residing in the CDP. The population density was 320.8 inhabitants per square mile (123.9/km^{2}). There were 569 housing units at an average density of 145.8 per square mile (56.3/km^{2}). The racial makeup of the CDP was 96.33% white, .96% African American, .16% Native American, 1.52% Asian, .08% Pacific Islander, .4% from other races, and .56% from two or more races. Hispanic or Latino of any race were 2.72% of the population.

There were 496 households, out of which 31.7% had children under the age of 18 living with them, 58.3% were married couples living together, 7.3% had a female householder with no husband present, and 30.6% were non-families. 24.0% of all households were made up of individuals, and 8.9% had someone living alone who was 65 years of age or older. The average household size was 2.52 and the average family size was 3.02.

In the CDP, the population was spread out, with 25.3% under the age of 18, 5.6% from 18 to 24, 24.8% from 25 to 44, 30.4% from 45 to 64, and 13.8% who were 65 years of age or older. The median age was 42 years. For every 100 females, there were 104.9 males. For every 100 females age 18 and over, there were 102.4 males.

The median income for a household in the CDP was $52,411, and the median income for a family was $57,700. Males had a median income of $36,250 versus $26,250 for females. The per capita income for the CDP was $23,710. About 4.5% of families and 5.8% of the population were below the poverty line, including 9.4% of those under age 18 and none of those age 65 or over.

== Education ==
The school district is Onteora Central School District.

== Notable people ==
- David Bowie
- Chris Hughes and Sean Eldridge
- Mary Margaret McBride
