= Kingston (town), New York =

Town in Ulster County, New York, US

Kingston
- Town
- Town of Kingston
- Location in Ulster County and the state of New York.

- Location within the state of New York
- Coordinates: 41°59′28″N 74°3′26″W
- Country: United States
- State: New York
- County: Ulster

Area
  - Total: 7.75 sq mi (20.07 km^{2})
  - Land: 7.70 sq mi (19.95 km^{2})
  - Water: 0.050 sq mi (0.13 km^{2}) 0.64%
- Elevation: 476 ft (145 m)

Population (2020)
  - Total: 933
  - Density: 121.1/sq mi (46.77/km^{2})
- Time zone: UTC-5 (Eastern (EST))
  - Summer (DST): UTC-4 (EDT)
- ZIP codes: 12401-12402
- Area code: 845
- FIPS code: 36-39738
- GNIS feature ID: 0979119

Kingston is a town in Ulster County, New York, United States. The Town of Kingston is in the northeastern part of Ulster County, north of the City of Kingston. Kingston is inside the Catskill Park. The population was 933 at the 2020 census.

== History ==
The original Town of Kingston was settled circa 1611, primarily as a military post, but that part of the town is now the City of Kingston. The town was formed by a patent granted in 1667 and its status as a town was reaffirmed in 1702. The current town does not border the city of Kingston.

In 1811, part of the Town of Kingston was used to form the Towns of Esopus and Saugerties. Additional parts of Kingston were used to set apart the City of Kingston in 1827 and the Town of Woodstock in 1879.

The quarrying industry brought many immigrant laborers to the town, and these new arrivals established themselves in the few communities within this town.

=== Sawkill ===
The community takes its name from the sawmills plus “kill”, the Dutch word for creek.

On January 1, 1765, William Legg bought around 100 acres of land lying on both sides of the Saw Kill. This was one of the first purchases to be made in the present town of Kingston. Legg built a sawmill and a house. The Legg family lived there for 88 years. It was reported that they ground wheat in the mill for the Continental Army. Saw mill and grist mill construction were commonplace along the Saw Kill River by the end of the 18th century. Milling died down by the end of the 19th because of decreased profitability.

The next owner was James Gaddis. He continued the milling operations and denied requests of people to use the land for quarrying. However, in the 1880s a fire destroyed both the house and the mill. Gaddis, needing money to rebuild, gave permission for quarrying bluestone on the Saw Mill creek ledge. The extensive quarrying moved the falls that were located by the mill back 300 feet.

Howe's Mill was another mill located on the Saw Kill. It was powered by a dam at Little Falls. The mill was used to make gunpowder and there were frequently explosions. The mill stayed mostly intact, however, and continued operating until the 1860s when it was hit by lightning.

Bluestone quarrying in the area increased in 1828 when the Delaware and Hudson Canal was being built. Bluestone was used to pave sidewalks in New York City, Albany, and Kingston and was shipped all over the world. Entrepreneurs bought up the rocky ground and brought unskilled immigrants, mostly Irish, upriver from Manhattan. Sawkill became a "quarry-town" with company-owned housing.

In the 1900s railroads helped spur tourism in the region. During the summers, many farmers would take in boarders from the city. The scenic beauty and trout fishing in the Saw Kill and other similar creeks is part of what attracted people to the area.

== Geography ==
According to the United States Census Bureau, the town has a total area of 7.8 square miles (20 km^{2}), of which 7.8 square miles (20 km^{2}) is land and 0.1 square miles (0.26 km^{2}) (0.64%) is water.

== Demographics ==
Historical population
Census	Pop.	Note	%±
1820	2,956		—
1830	4,170		41.1%
1840	5,824		39.7%
1850	10,232		75.7%
1860	16,640		62.6%
1870	21,943		31.9%
1880	1,053		−95.2%
1890	651		−38.2%
1900	524		−19.5%
1910	343		−34.5%
1920	166		−51.6%
1930	194		16.9%
1940	196		1.0%
1950	227		15.8%
1960	490		115.9%
1970	748		52.7%
1980	924		23.5%
1990	864		−6.5%
2000	912		5.6%
2010	889		−2.5%
2020	933		4.9%
U.S. Decennial Census

=== 2000 census ===
As of the census of 2000, there were 908 people, 356 households, and 249 families residing in the town. The population density was 117.1 people per square mile (45.2 people/km^{2}). There were 398 housing units at an average density of 51.3 per square mile (19.8/km^{2}). The racial makeup of the town was 95.59% White, 1.76% Black or African American, 0.22% Native American, 0.44% Asian, 0.11% from other races, and 1.87% from two or more races. Hispanic or Latino of any race were 1.65% of the population.

There were 356 households, out of which 30.9% had children under the age of 18 living with them, 56.7% were married couples living together, 8.4% had a female householder with no husband present, and 29.8% were non-families. 23.3% of all households were made up of individuals, and 6.5% had someone living alone who was 65 years of age or older. The average household size was 2.55 and the average family size was 2.99.

In the town, the population was spread out, with 22.9% under the age of 18, 6.1% from 18 to 24, 29.2% from 25 to 44, 30.3% from 45 to 64, and 11.6% who were 65 years of age or older. The median age was 41 years. For every 100 females, there were 110.7 males. For every 100 females age 18 and over, there were 107.1 males.

The median income for a household in the town was $42,500, and the median income for a family was $48,182. Males had a median income of $32,391 versus $25,956 for females. The per capita income for the town was $18,472. About 6.2% of families and 7.6% of the population were below the poverty line, including 10.9% of those under age 18 and 3.8% of those age 65 or over.

=== 2010 census ===
As of the 2010 census, the population was 889. The racial makeup of the town was 93.02% White, 3.94% Black or African American, 0.34% Native American, 1.24% Asian, 0.56% from other races, and 0.90% from two or more races. Hispanic or Latino of any race were 3.1% of the population.

=== 2020 census ===
As of the 2020 census, the population was 933. The racial makeup of the town was 87.67% White, 1.07% Black or African American, 0.21% Native American, 1.29% Asian, 1.39% from other races, and 8.36% from two or more races. Hispanic or Latino of any race were 6.86% of the population.

== Communities and locations in the Town of Kingston ==
- Halihan Hill – A hamlet north of Sawkill.
- Jockey Hill – A hamlet west of Sawkill.
- Saw Kill a stream passing through the center of the town and tributary of the Esopus River.
- Sawkill – A hamlet near the center of the town on Route 30 and Saw Kill.
- Stony Hollow – formerly a hamlet on Route 28.
- Sweet Meadows – A hamlet near the western town line, on the south side of Saw Kill.
