= Olivebridge, New York =

Hamlet in New York state, United States

- Hamlet
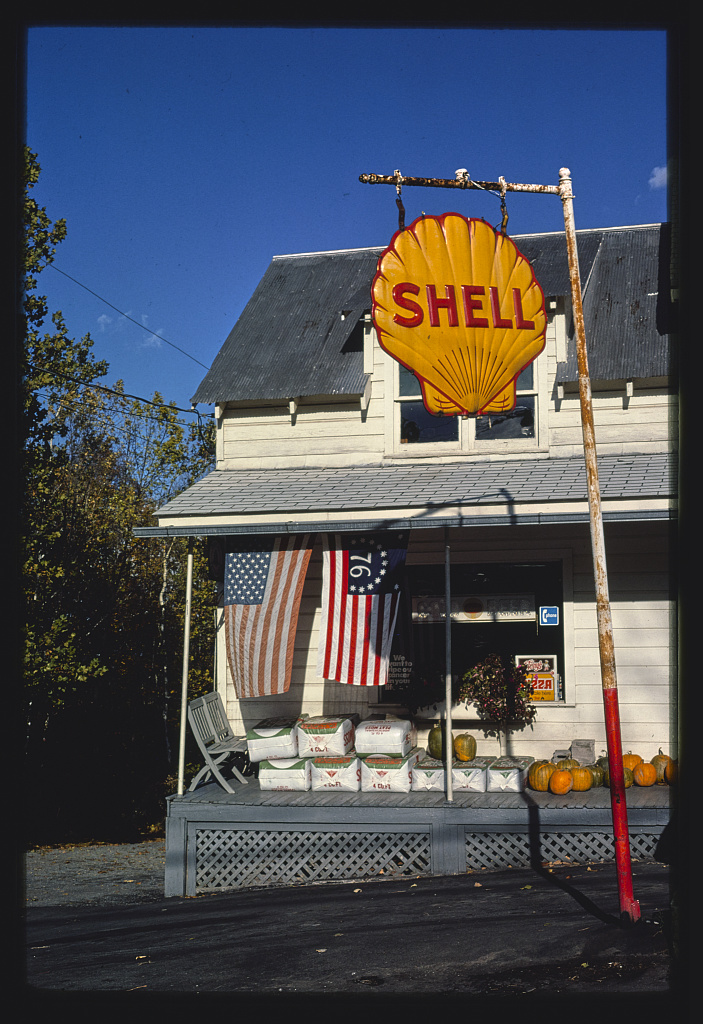
- Olivebridge Shell gas station & general store

- Location within New York Location within the United States
- Coordinates: 41°55′17.3″N 74°12′54.5″W
- Country: United States
- State: New York
- County: Ulster

Area
  - Total: 18.47 sq mi (47.8 km^{2})
  - Land: 18.45 sq mi (47.8 km^{2})
  - Water: 0.02 sq mi (0.052 km^{2})
- Elevation: 568 ft (173 m)

Population (2020)
  - Total: 1,661
  - Density: 276.3/sq mi (106.67/km^{2})
- Time zone: UTC-5 (EST)
  - Summer (DST): UTC-4 (EDT)
- ZIP code: 12461
- Area code: 845
- GNIS feature ID: 959342

Olivebridge is a hamlet in the town of Olive, Ulster County, New York, United States, within Catskill Park and the Catskill Mountains.

The community's name is sometimes written “Olive Bridge,” but the United States Board on Geographic Names lists the name as “Olivebridge.”

The U.S. Postal Service ZIP code for Olivebridge is 12461 which includes the hamlet of Krumville.

== Arts and culture ==
- The Ashokan-Turnwood Covered Bridge was listed on the National Register of Historic Places in 2000.

== Sports ==
- Onteora Speedway (aka Olivebridge Speedway and Onteora Speedway Park) was a 1/2-mile (0.80 km) dirt oval facility opened in 1960. The facility featured stock car racing, initially sanctioned by the Hudson Valley Racing Association which also hosted events at the Victory Speedway. The facility went bankrupt in 1966, and later efforts to reopen the speedway were unsuccessful. (Note: Geolocation of Onteora Speedway: 41.9284°N 74.2090°W)
