= Olive, New York =

Olive
- Town
- Location in Ulster County and the state of New York.
- Coordinates: 41°57′N 74°15′W
- Country: United States
- State: New York
- County: Ulster

Area
  - Total: 65.19 sq mi (168.85 km^{2})
  - Land: 58.45 sq mi (151.38 km^{2})
  - Water: 6.75 sq mi (17.47 km^{2})
- Elevation: 705 ft (215 m)

Population (2020)
  - Total: 4,226
  - Density: 72.30/sq mi (27.92/km^{2})
- Time zone: UTC-5 (Eastern (EST))
  - Summer (DST): UTC-4 (EDT)
- ZIP code: 12461
- Area code: 845
- FIPS code: 36-54749
- GNIS feature ID: 0979307
- Website: Town website

Olive is a town in Ulster County, New York, United States. The town is west of Kingston, New York, and is inside the Catskill Park. The population was 4,226 at the 2020 census.

== History ==
The town was settled circa 1740. The town of Olive was established in 1823 from parts of the towns of Hurley, Marbletown, and Shandaken. A limited edition 1973 commemorative plate, shown below, includes this text on the back:

The town of Olive, Ulster County, New York, was taken from Shandaken, Marbletown, and Hurley and erected by law on April 15, 1823. At that time a name was suggested for the new town by quoting the following verse from the Bible: 'and Noah sent out a Dove from the Ark and when the waters subsided she returned with an Olive leaf in her mouth.' 'Let us call it the Town of Olive.' The first town meeting was held on the second Tuesday in May 1824. The seal was adopted by the Olive Town Board on November 9, 1971. It was suggested by the Town Historian, Vera Sickler, and designed and executed by Mrs. Tisanne Gardner of Boiceville, N.Y.

front (symbol)	back (history)

The creation of the Ashokan Reservoir in 1917 covered some of the communities of Olive. The reservoir is owned by New York City and is part of the city's water system.

== Geography ==
According to the United States Census Bureau, the town has a total area of 65.1 square miles (169 km^{2}), of which 58.7 square miles (152 km^{2}) is land and 6.5 square miles (17 km^{2}) (9.93%) is water.

== Demographics ==
Historical population
Census	Pop.	Note	%±
1830	1,636		—
1840	2,023		23.7%
1850	2,710		34.0%
1860	3,262		20.4%
1870	3,083		−5.5%
1880	2,927		−5.1%
1890	2,649		−9.5%
1900	2,465		−6.9%
1910	4,497		82.4%
1920	1,237		−72.5%
1930	1,196		−3.3%
1940	1,320		10.4%
1950	1,463		10.8%
1960	1,999		36.6%
1970	2,857		42.9%
1980	3,924		37.3%
1990	4,086		4.1%
2000	4,579		12.1%
2010	4,419		−3.5%
2020	4,226		−4.4%
U.S. Decennial Census 2020

As of the census of 2000, there were 4,579 people, 1,869 households, and 1,263 families residing in the town. The population density was 78 inhabitants per square mile (30/km^{2}). There were 2,306 housing units at an average density of 39.3 per square mile (15.2/km^{2}). The racial makeup of the town was 96.68% white, .61% African American, .17% Native American, .92% Asian, .17% Pacific Islander, .48% from other races, and 0.96% from two or more races. Hispanic or Latino of any race were 2.51% of the population.

There were 1,869 households, out of which 29.8% had children under the age of 18 living with them, 55.4% were married couples living together, 7.9% had a female householder with no husband present, and 32.4% were non-families. 24.5% of all households were made up of individuals, and 8.5% had someone living alone who was 65 years of age or older. The average household size was 2.43 and the average family size was 2.91.

In the town, the population was spread out, with 24.2% under the age of 18, 4.6% from 18 to 24, 26.6% from 25 to 44, 31.1% from 45 to 64, and 13.6% who were 65 years of age or older. The median age was 42 years. For every 100 females, there were 99.1 males. For every 100 females age 18 and over, there were 96.0 males.

The median income for a household in the town was $45,409, and the median income for a family was $50,931. Males had a median income of $33,125 versus $27,008 for females. The per capita income for the town was $21,569. About 3.5% of families and 5.0% of the population were below the poverty line, including 4.6% of those under age 18 and 3.6% of those age 65 or over.

== Communities and locations in Olive ==
The Nine Hamlets are:

- Ashokan – north of the reservoir on Route 28, bordering the towns of Hurley and Woodstock.
- Brodhead – a remnant of a pre-reservoir hamlet located southwest of the reservoir, between West Shokan and Olivebridge.
- Boiceville – at the northwestern end of the reservoir on Route 28.
- Brown's Station – on the eastern border of Olive, now mostly submerged under the reservoir.
- Krumville – southeastern corner of Olive, bordering Samsonville, Olivebridge and the town of Marbletown.
- Olivebridge – south of the reservoir on Route 213. Relocated from its pre-reservoir site on Esopus Creek. The area now called Olivebridge was formerly known as Tongore.
- Samsonville – the southwestern corner of Olive, bordering the town of Rochester.
- Shokan – north of the reservoir on Route 28, west of Ashokan.
- West Shokan – south of Boiceville at the western end of the reservoir, bordering the towns of Shandaken and Denning to the west.

Other locations

- Ashokan Reservoir – the western end of the reservoir is inside the town.
- Brodhead's Bridge – a former railroad station submerged by the reservoir.
- Cold Brook – a former railroad station in Boiceville.
- Davis Corners – part of Olivebridge, at the intersection of Ulster County routes 2A and 4.
- Olive City – a now-submerged hamlet between the original sites of Shokan and Ashton (a former hamlet in the town of Hurley, site of the Olive Branch station on the Ulster & Delaware railroad).
- Steiny Hill is a mountain located in the Catskill Mountains of New York southwest of West Shokan. Little Rocky is located north, and Flat Hill is located west of Steiny Hill.
- Winchell – now part of Olivebridge, bordering Samsonville and Krumville. Former site of a schoolhouse.

== See also ==
- Olive and Hurley Old School Baptist Church
- Ashokan Center
- Ashokan Rail Trail
