= West Shokan, New York =

- Hamlet
- Location within New York Location within the United States
- Coordinates: 41°58′02″N 74°17′14″W
- Country: United States
- State: New York
- County: Ulster
- Elevation: 666 ft (203 m)
- Time zone: UTC-5 (Eastern (EST))
  - Summer (DST): UTC-4 (EDT)
- ZIP code: 12494
- Area code: 845
- GNIS feature ID: 970867

West Shokan is a hamlet in the town of Olive in Ulster County, New York, United States. The community is located near New York State Route 28A and is 15.2 miles (24.5 km) west of Kingston. West Shokan has a post office with the ZIP code 12494.
