= New York City Water Tunnel No. 3 =

Water-supply system

Coordinates: 40.894°N 73.890°W

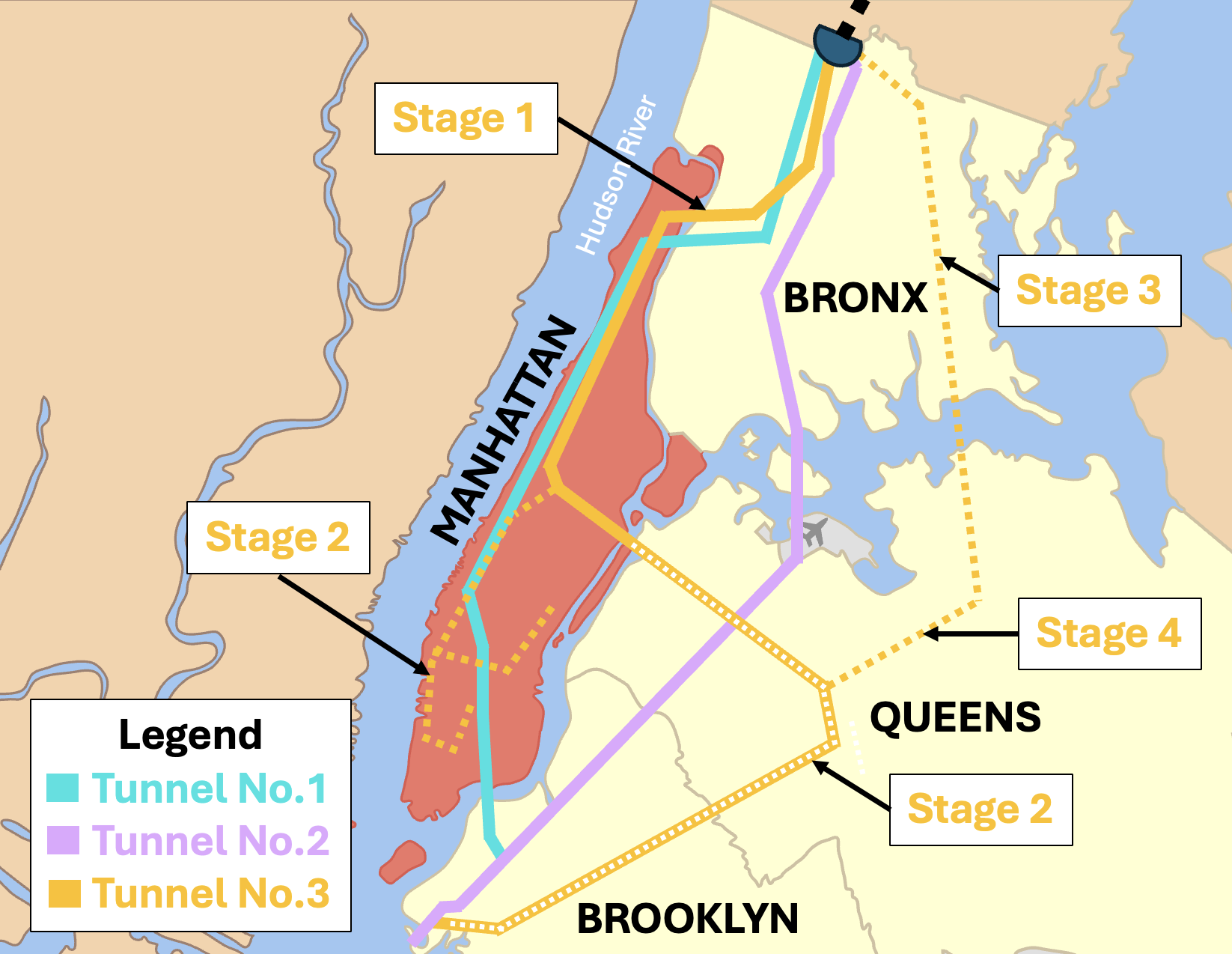
Map of New York City's water supply tunnels, including Tunnel No. 3

New York City Water Tunnel No. 3 is a water-supply tunnel forming part of the New York City water supply system. It is being built by the New York City Department of Environmental Protection (NYCDEP) to provide New York City with a third connection to its upstate water supply. The tunnel will serve as a backup to Water Tunnel No. 1, completed in 1917, and Water Tunnel No. 2, completed in 1936.

Water Tunnel No. 3 is the largest capital construction project in New York City history. Construction began in 1970. Portions of the tunnel were placed into service in 1998 and 2013 and the remaining sections are expected to be complete by 2032.

The complete tunnel will be more than 60 miles (97 km) long, travel 500 feet (150 m) below street level in sections, and will cost over $6 billion.

== Stages ==
=== One ===
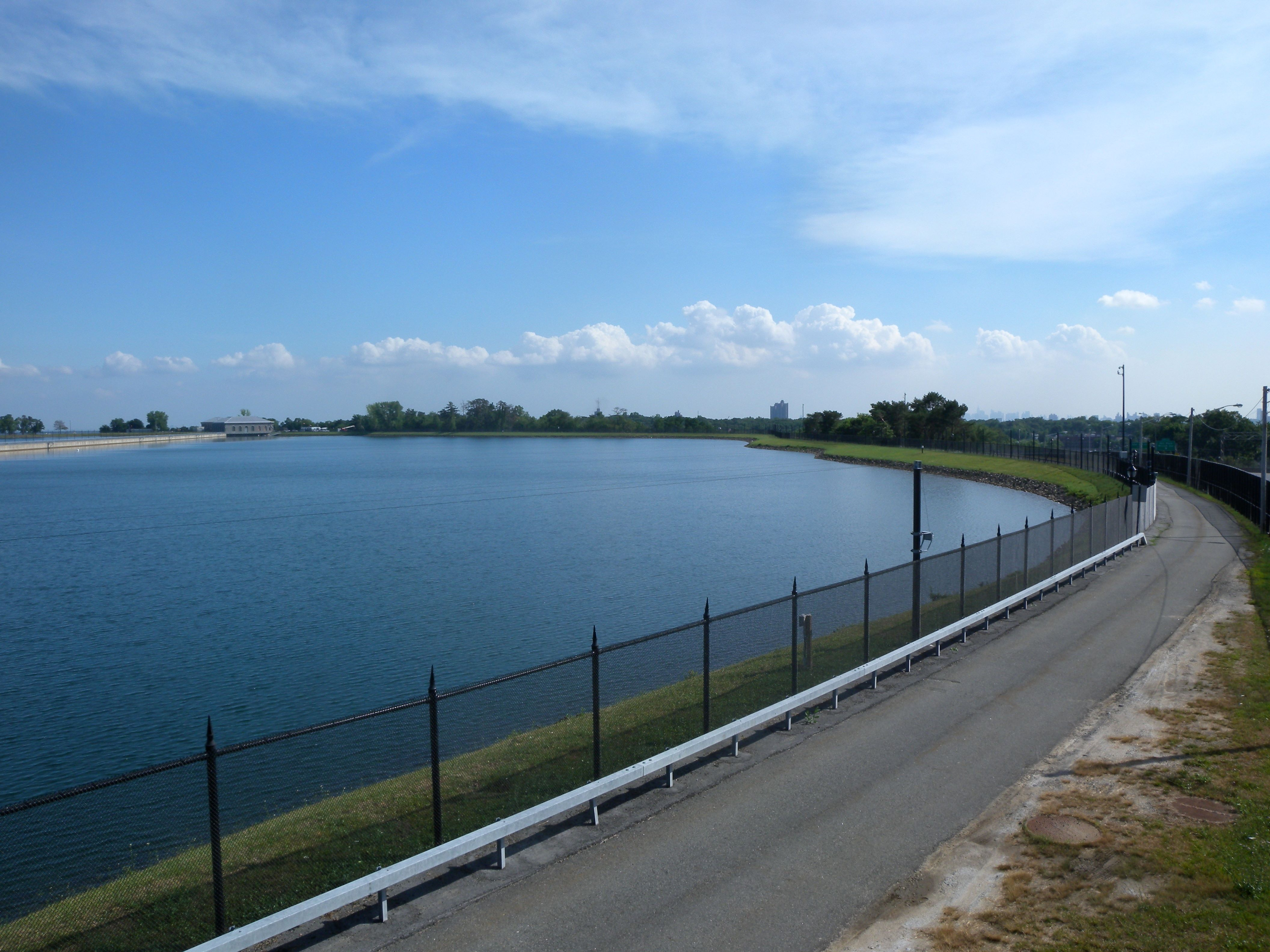
Stage One of the tunnel begins at the Hillview Reservoir in Yonkers

The project was authorized in 1954 and imagined as "the greatest nondefense construction project in the history of Western Civilization". The city determined that it needed a third water tunnel so that Tunnels 1 and 2 could be closed for inspection and repairs. Stage One construction of Tunnel 3 began in 1970 and completed in 1993. This portion was put into service in 1998 and cost about $1 billion.

This first section was bored through bedrock between 250 and 800 feet (76 and 244 m) underground, using drilling and blasting techniques. Section one is 13 miles (21 km) long and starts at Hillview Reservoir in Yonkers, New York, then crosses under Central Park in Manhattan to reach Fifth Avenue at 78th Street. From there it runs under the East River and Roosevelt Island into Astoria, Queens. It is a concrete-lined tunnel that is 24 feet (7.3 m) in diameter and reduces to 20 feet (6.1 m) in diameter before connecting to 14 vertical shafts.

=== Two ===
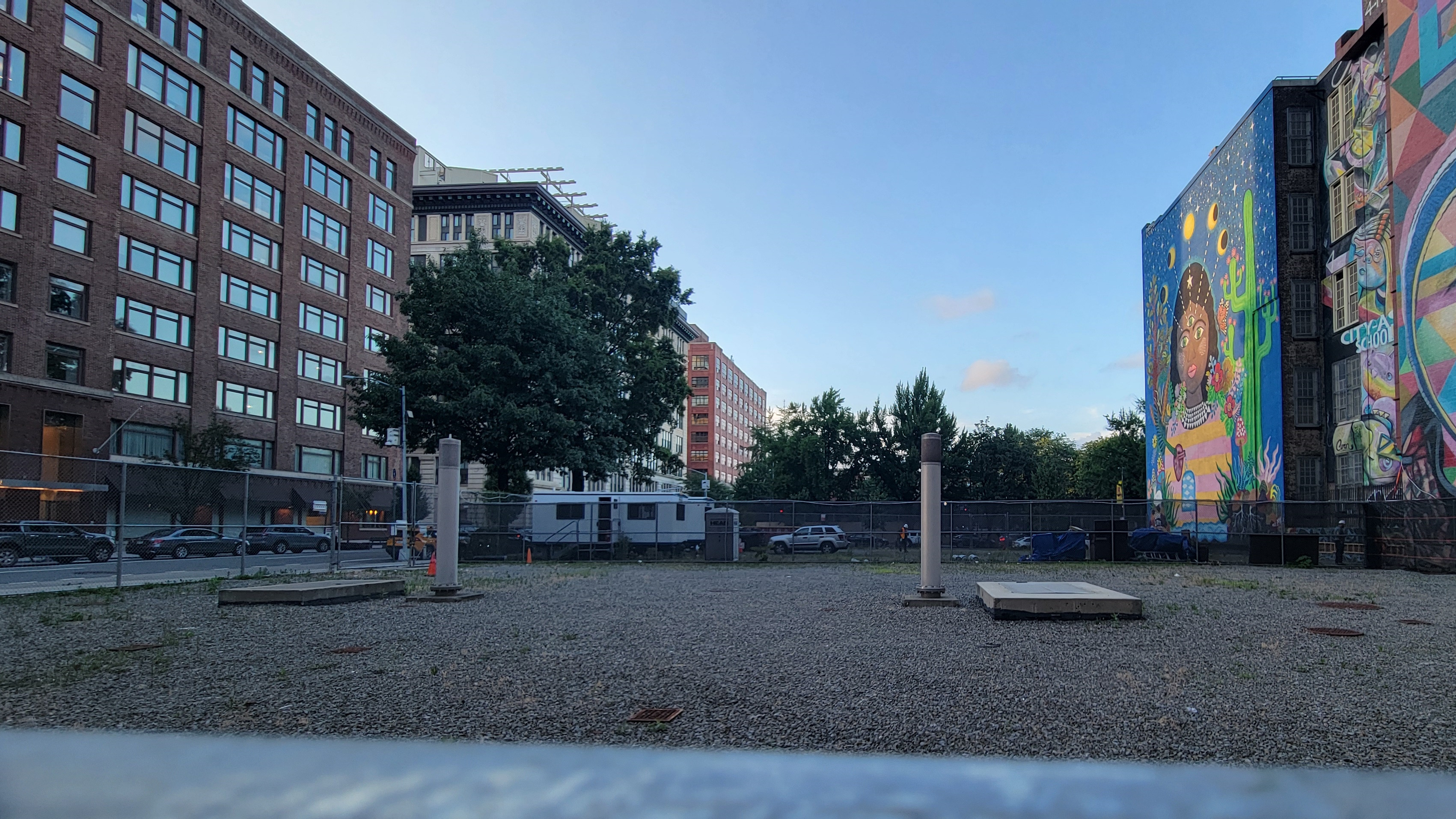
Hatchways and air vents at Shaft 28B connecting to Stage Two of the tunnel in Hudson Square, Lower Manhattan.

Stage Two was built using tunnel boring machines and comprises two sections. The Brooklyn and Queens section runs 10 miles (16 km) and begins in Red Hook, Brooklyn, where it connects to the Richmond Tunnel for Staten Island. It passes through Park Slope, Bedford-Stuyvesant, and Bushwick before reaching Maspeth, Queens. From Maspeth it runs through Woodside and Astoria, where it connects to the end of the Stage One section. The Brooklyn section is 16 feet (4.9 m) in diameter, and the Queens section is 20 feet (6.1 m).

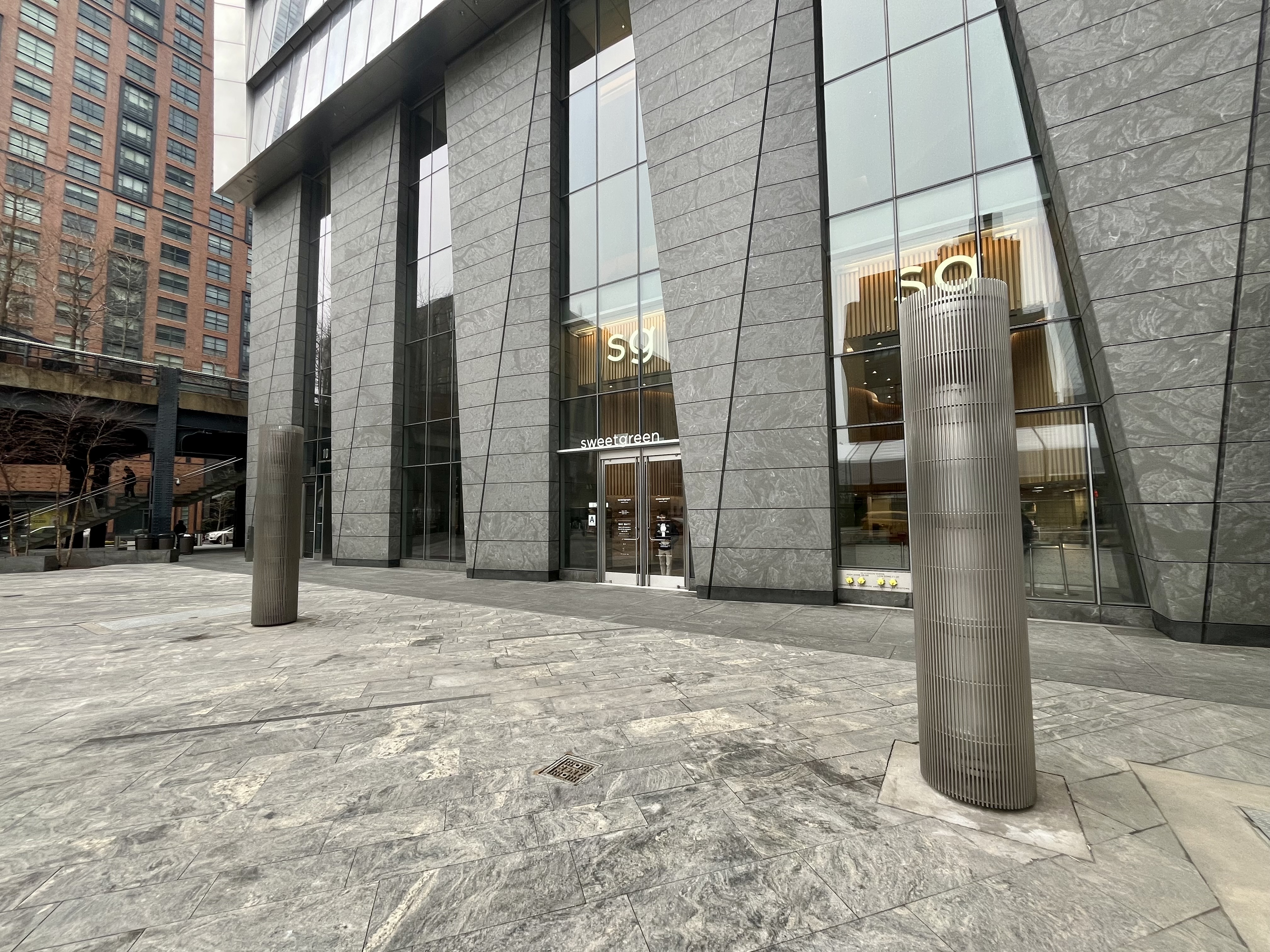
Air vents at Shaft 26B outside 10 Hudson Yards, the location from which construction of the Manhattan section of Stage Two began in 2001

The Manhattan section is 12 feet (3.7 m) in diameter and runs for 8.5 miles (13.7 km). It begins at a valve chamber under Central Park, runs south along the west side of Manhattan to Canal Street, and curves around to come partway through the Lower East Side. A spur of the Manhattan tunnel begins at Shaft 26B on the west side (located at Tenth Avenue between 30th and 31st streets), goes to the east side to Second Avenue, and then heads north to about 59th Street. Groundbreaking for construction of the Manhattan section took place in 2001 at Shaft 26B, from which all three legs of the tunnel (the northern, southern and crosstown legs) originate. Construction of the tunnel itself began in 2003 and was completed in 2008. After the construction of ten riser shafts was completed, this section of the tunnel opened in 2013.

As of 2022, two additional riser shafts (17B and 18B), each over 700 feet (210 m) deep, were under construction in Queens. The design of the shafts was revised in 2018 to increase their width and depth, allowing for a future connection to Stage Four of the tunnel without the need to shut down the Brooklyn and Queens section of Stage Two. The shafts are expected to be completed in 2032. Shaft 17B is located on 37th Avenue in Long Island City and Shaft 18B is located on 73rd Place in Maspeth.

=== Three ===
What used to be called Stage Three is now being referred to as a separate project, the "Kensico–City Tunnel". It will be 16 miles (26 km) long and 24 feet (7.3 m) in diameter, running from the Kensico Reservoir in Westchester to the Van Cortlandt Valve Chamber complex in the Bronx. Completion of this stage will enable Water Tunnel No. 3 to operate at a higher pressure as a result of the higher elevation of Kensico Reservoir compared to Hillview Reservoir.

=== Four ===
Stage Four is a proposed tunnel that would start at the Hillview Reservoir in Yonkers, pass through the eastern Bronx and then through Queens, where it would eventually meet the Stage Two section.

== Valve chambers ==
The largest valve chamber is in Van Cortlandt Park. It is built 250 feet (76 m) below the park surface. It controls the flow of water from the city's Catskill and Delaware systems. These systems provide 90 percent of the city's current drinking water. The Van Cortlandt Park Valve Chamber is 620 feet (190 m) long, 43 feet (13 m) wide and 41 feet (12 m) high. The complex has nine vertical shafts and two manifolds. Each manifold is 560 feet (170 m) long and 24 feet (7.3 m) in diameter and is currently in operation.

Additional, though smaller, valve chambers are in use under Central Park at 79th Street, under Roosevelt Island, and in Jackson Heights.

== Deaths ==
Since 1970, when construction on the tunnel began, twenty-four people have died in construction-related accidents. The deaths have included twenty-three workers (sandhogs, operating engineers and other employees) and a 12-year-old boy, Don-re Carroll, who fell 500 feet (150 m) to his death down a 12-foot-wide (3.7 m) riser shaft while exploring uncapped water pipes at a construction site in the University Heights section of the Bronx. No deaths have occurred since 1997. The safety of the tunneling work has been improved with the use of tunnel boring machines to excavate the tunnel beginning in Stage 2 (compared to the drilling and blasting techniques used in Stage 1). Another safety improvement has involved the use of vertical conveyor belts to transport muck to the surface.

On October 31, 2000, a ceremony was held adjacent to Van Cortlandt Park at the site of a planned memorial to honor the workers who have died during construction of the tunnel. The Third Water Tunnel Workers Memorial was completed in 2007 and is located at the intersection of Katonah Avenue and East 242nd Street in Woodlawn Heights. It includes a drinking fountain, a flagpole with a base made of stones mined from the tunnel, and a manhole cover for each worker that is engraved with their name and year of death. A remembrance mass for the fallen workers is held annually on Ascension Thursday at the nearby St. Barnabas Church.

== Construction progress ==
In 2002, New York City mayor Michael Bloomberg made completion of the tunnel a priority, and set a goal date of 2021. Commissioner Christopher O. Ward helped move this project along for the Mayor. A New York Times report in 2016 stated that mayor Bill de Blasio was postponing completion of the project indefinitely, but he subsequently stated that this was a miscommunication between his press office and the Times, and that the completion date was actually being pushed up to 2020. In 2017 De Blasio authorized city expenditures of $300 million for Tunnel No. 3, with an expected project completion date of 2025.

Work on the final shafts for the tunnel began in 2021. In September 2022 NYCDEP Commissioner Rohit Aggarwala stated that following the construction of the two deep riser shafts in Brooklyn and Queens, the Tunnel No. 3 project will be completed in 2032.

== In popular culture ==
The construction of Water Tunnel No. 3 was the subject of an off-off-Broadway play of the same title created in the mid-1990s by Marty Pottenger in cooperation with NYCDEP and Laborers Local Union No. 147 (the sandhogs union). Pottenger's work on the subject also included a 5-year-long community art project containing pictures and items associated with the tunnel's construction.

The under-construction tunnel plays a role in the action movie Die Hard with a Vengeance. Several dump trucks with gold bullion stolen from the New York Federal Reserve Bank travel through the tunnel to evade blockades on Manhattan's bridges and tunnels. Protagonist John McClane (played by Bruce Willis) pursues, but as a temporary dam is destroyed by the antagonists, a wall of water approaches him. McClane tries to flee, catches the grate of an escape hatch and is ejected on top of a fountain formed by the water pressure.

The tunnel appears in the final episode in the fourth season of the TV series The Strain where it serves as the site of the final confrontation between the protagonists and the vampire Master.

Construction of the water tunnel has also been the subject of several novels including This Side of Brightness by Colum McCann, Payback by Thomas Kelly and Table Money by Jimmy Breslin.
