= Catskill-Delaware Water Ultraviolet Disinfection Facility =

- Etymology: Catskill Aqueduct, Delaware Aqueduct

General information
- Status: Completed
- Type: Water treatment facility
- Location: Westchester County, New York, United States
- Coordinates: 41.078°N 73.8088°W
- Completed: 2013
- Cost: US$1.6 billion
- Owner: City of New York
- Operator: New York City Department of Environmental Protection

Technical details
- Grounds: 160,000-square-foot (15,000 m^{2})

Design and construction
- Main contractor: Trojan Technologies

The Catskill-Delaware Water Ultraviolet Disinfection Facility is a 270,000-square-foot (25,000 m^{2}) ultraviolet (UV) water disinfection plant built in Westchester County, New York, to disinfect water for the New York City water supply system. The compound is the largest ultraviolet germicidal irradiation plant in the world.

The UV facility treats water delivered by two of the city's aqueduct systems, the Catskill Aqueduct and the Delaware Aqueduct, via the Kensico Reservoir. (The city's third supply system, the New Croton Aqueduct, has a separate treatment plant.)

The plant has 56 energy-efficient UV reactors, and cost the city $1.6 billion. Mayor Michael Bloomberg created research groups between 2004–2006 to decide the best and most cost-effective ways to modernize the city's water filtration process, as a secondary stage following the existing chlorination and fluoridation facilities. The UV technology effectively controls microorganisms such as Giardia and Cryptosporidium which are resistant to chlorine treatment. The city staff determined that the cheapest alternatives to a UV system would cost over $3 billion. In response to this finding, Bloomberg decided to set up a public competitive contract auction. Ontario based Trojan Technologies won the contract.

The facility treats 2.2 billion U.S. gallons (8.3 billion liters) of water per day. The new facility was originally set to be in operation by the end of 2012. The facility opened on October 8, 2013.
