= Sandhog =

Term for underground construction workers in New York City

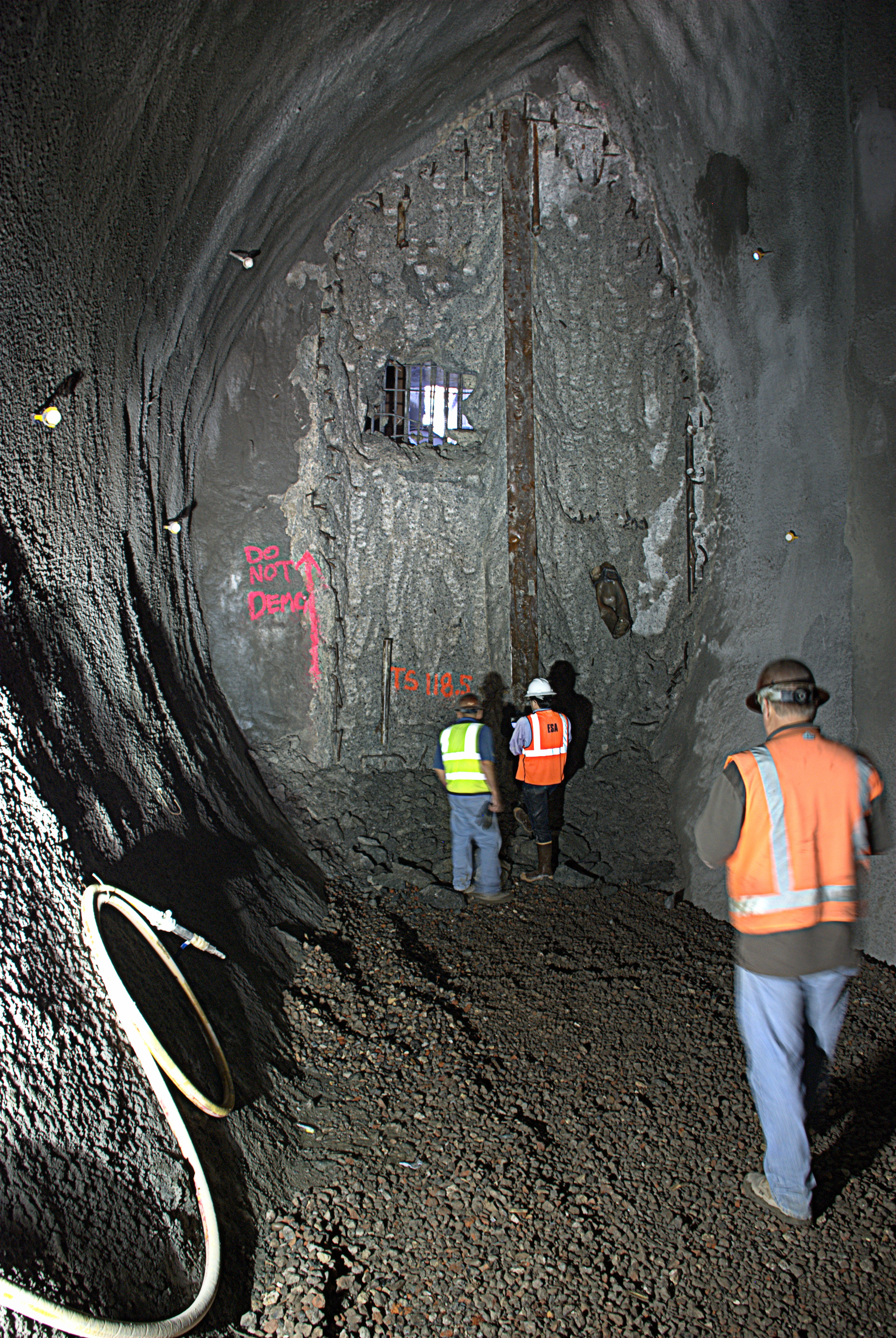
Sandhogs in New York City's East Side Access

Sandhog is the slang term given to urban miners and construction workers who work underground on a variety of excavation projects in New York City, Los Angeles and later other cities. Generally these projects involve tunneling, caisson excavation, road building, or some other type of underground construction or mining projects. The miners work with a variety of tools including using tunnel boring machines and explosives to remove material for the project they are building. The term sandhog is an American colloquialism.

Starting with their first job in 1872, the Brooklyn Bridge, the "hogs" have built a large part of the New York City infrastructure including the subway tunnels and sewers, Water Tunnels No. 1 and No. 2 as well as the currently under construction Water Tunnel No. 3, the Lincoln, Holland, Queens-Midtown, and Brooklyn-Battery tunnels. In addition, they worked on the foundations for most of the bridges and many of the skyscrapers in the city. Traditionally, these workers have been Irish or Irish American. Some West Indians are now sandhogs. Sandhogging is often a tradition and is passed down through generations of families; since mining projects span decades, it is not uncommon for multi-generations of families to work together on the same job. Warren Beatty was a rare exception in the 1950s, as a recently arrived to New York individual, who worked as a Sandhog relatively briefly on the third tube of the Lincoln Tunnel.

== Occupational hazards ==
Sandhogs are subject to numerous occupational hazards; the construction of a water tunnel under New York City resulted in the deaths of 23 workers and one child, who fell into an unsecured shaft, over 46 years of excavation. Historically, work in pneumatic caissons underwater exposed workers to the risk of decompression sickness upon rapid emergence. In addition to risk of physical injury, sandhogs laboring alongside tunnel boring machines can experience respiratory damage due to dust exposure.

== Appearances in media ==
- In the October 1997 issue of Esquire magazine, a series of photographs by David Allee, with a text accompaniment by Thomas Kelly, document the life and work of sandhogs.
- In 2006 at Grand Central Terminal in New York City there was a large-scale photo and video installation about the sandhogs, "The Sandhog Project", created by artist Gina LeVay.
- Thomas Kelly's 1997 novel about sandhogs, Payback, was reissued in 2008 as Sandhogs (ISBN 978-1593762360) by Soft Skull Press.
- David Grann's 2003 article about sandhogs, City of Water, appeared in the September 1 issue of The New Yorker and was republished in his collection The Devil and Sherlock Holmes. It has been optioned for a movie.
- On September 7, 2008, The History Channel began "Sandhogs" a series on the sandhogs.
- The CSI: NY episode "A Man a Mile" deals with the death of a sandhog during construction of Water Tunnel No. 3.
- A 2010 episode of the podcast Radiolab titled "Cities" includes interviews with several sandhogs.
- The Cold Case episode "Sandhogs" (Season 4, Episode 3) deals with the death of a Sandhog in 1948.
- A Public Broadcasting System (PBS) sponsored documentary show American Experience 2014 episode "The Rise and Fall of Penn Station" details the work done by the sandhogs in the creation of the rail tunnels connecting New York and New Jersey.
- The podcast 99% Invisible released an episode on sandhogs in March 2015.
- Chuck Wendig's urban fantasy novel, The Blue Blazes (ISBN 9780857663351). The protagonist is a former sandhog, and one of the central elements of the plot is Water Tunnel No. 3, a sandhog construction project.
- The final episode of season 4 of The Strain refers to sandhogs as the builders of Water Tunnel No. 3, where the scenes were filmed.
- Scorpion Season 3 Episode 14, where Walter refers to the workers as mole rats, as he felt the sandhogs nickname 'is illogical', and Toby corrects him to sandhogs.
- On September 12, 1956, NBC's Screen Directors Playhouse aired the final episode of the program, a teleplay directed by Allan Dwan and starring William Bendix and Dennis Harper. The title alludes to the high air pressure necessary to keep the river from flooding the work site. The episode tells the story of a father and son working as "Sandhoggers" constructing a tunnel below the Hudson River.
- On January 23, 1949, Box 13 episode "Three to Die" aired. It starred Alan Ladd as Dan Holiday. Dan goes undercover as a sandhog where construction on a new tunnel under the city's river has been plagued with deadly sabotage.

== Literature ==
- Colum McCann's "This Side of Brightness," Picador, New York 1998, ISBN 0-312-42197-4.
- Jimmy Breslin "Table Money," Tickner & Fields, New York 1986, ISBN 9780899193120.
- E. L. Doctorow's "Ragtime (novel)": Chapter 13, Random House, 1975, ISBN 0-394-46901-1

== Movies ==
- In the 1943 romantic comedy No Time for Love, photographer Claudette Colbert is on assignment to take pictures of a tunnel project under the Hudson River and falls for sandhog Fred MacMurray.
- In the 1996 film Daylight, directed by Rob Cohen and starring Sylvester Stallone, there are references to "sandhogs" as well as detailed history on how these men lived under the pressures of building the Holland Tunnel.
- In 2006 film Disaster Zone: Volcano in New York, directed by Robert Lee and starring Pascale Hutton, there is reference to "sandhog" when Hutton says that she is one.
- In 2007 Edward Burns also narrated the film The Greatest Tunnel Ever Built for The History Channel.
