= New York City water supply system =

Municipal water supply system

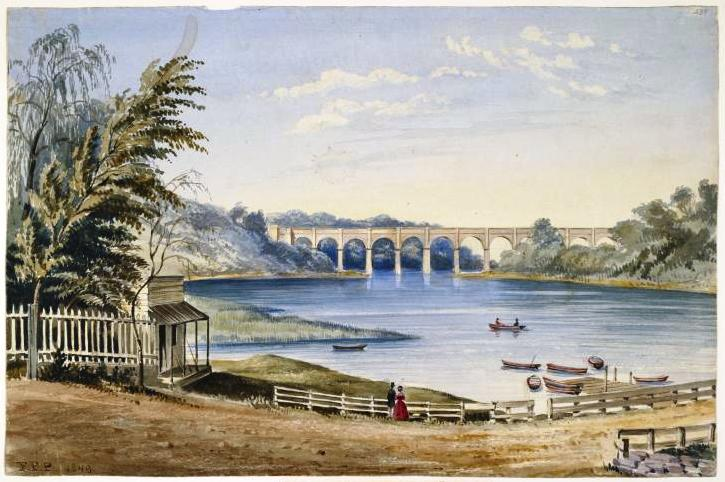
High Bridge in 1849, part of the Old Croton Aqueduct, the city's first water supply system

The New York City water supply system is a combination of aqueducts, reservoirs, and tunnels which supplies fresh water to New York City. With three major water systems (Croton, Catskill, and Delaware) stretching up to 125 miles (201 km) away to the north, the city's water supply system is one of the most extensive municipal water systems in the world.

New York's water treatment process is simpler than most other American cities. This largely reflects how well protected its watersheds are. The city has sought to restrict development surrounding them. One of its largest watershed protection programs is the Land Acquisition Program, under which the New York City Department of Environmental Protection (DEP) has purchased or protected, through conservation easement, over 130,000 acres (53,000 ha) since 1997. With all the care given, the city's water supply system is partially exempted from filtration requirements by both the federal and the state government, saving more than "$10 billion to build a massive filtration plant, and at least another $100 million annually on its operation". Moreover, the special topography the waterways run on allows 95% of the system's water to be supplied by gravity. The percentage of pumped water does change when the water level in the reservoirs is out of the normal range.

== History ==
=== Early years ===
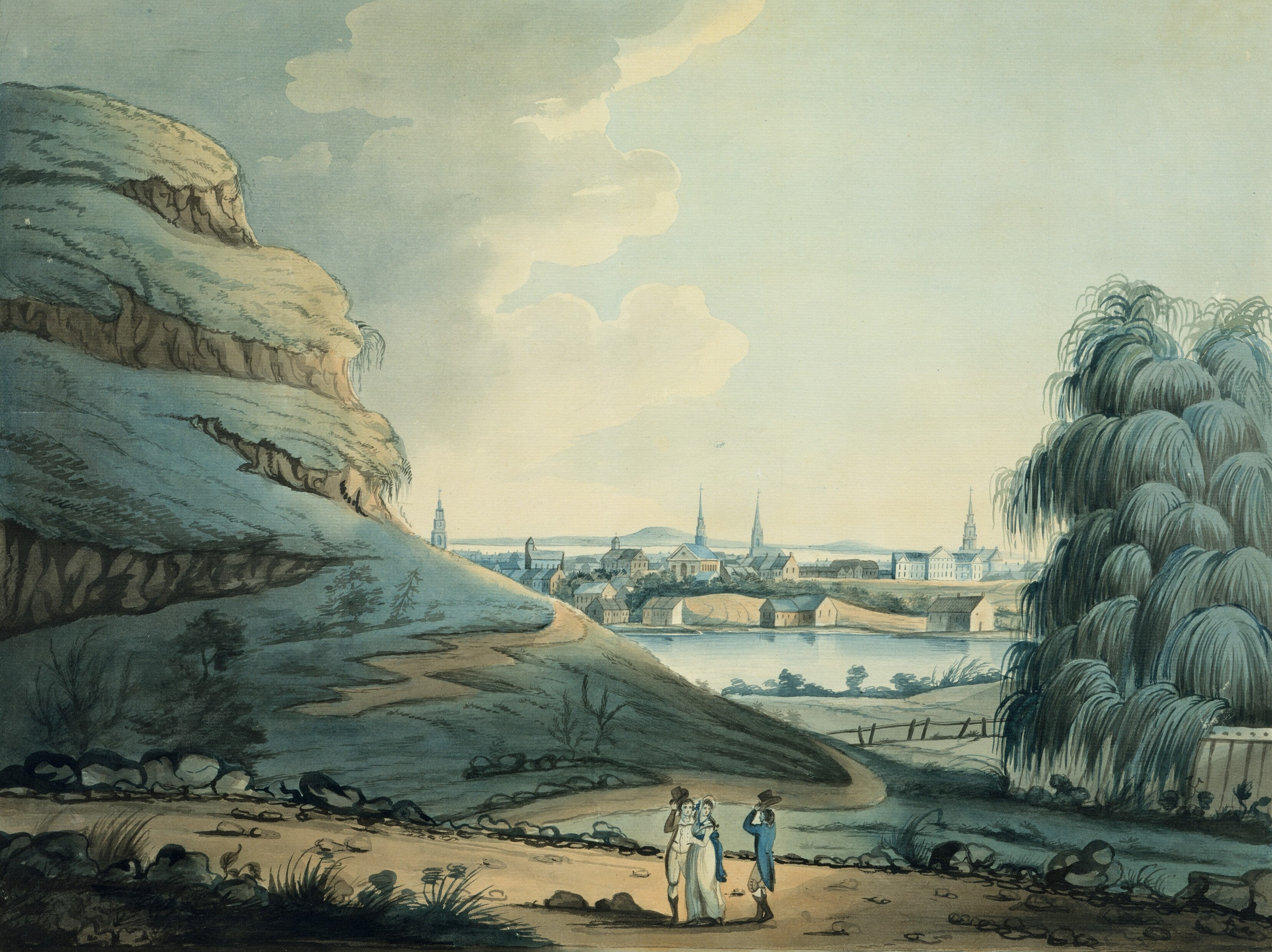
A 1798 watercolor of Collect Pond. Bayard's Mount, a 110-foot (34 m) hillock, is in the left foreground. Prior to being levelled around 1811 it was located near the current intersection of Mott and Grand Streets. New York City, which then extended to a stockade which ran approximately north–southeast from today's Chambers Street and Broadway, is visible beyond the southern shore.

Until the eighteenth century, New York City solely depended on primitive means such as wells and rainwater reservoirs to collect water for daily use. The first public well was dug in Bowling Green in 1677, and the first reservoir was built on the East Side of Manhattan in 1776 after the population grew up to 22,000.

Collect Pond, or "Fresh Water Pond", was a body of fresh water in what is now Chinatown in Lower Manhattan. For the first two centuries of European settlement in Manhattan, it was the main water supply system for the growing city. Later, the city was aware of its deteriorated water quality, owing to its rapid population growth (from 60,000 to 200,000 from 1800 to 1830), which had a considerable danger of causing epidemics.

In April 1831, a new water supply and distribution system opened, for fighting fires. It included a well and cistern on 13th Street between Bowery (today 4th Avenue) and Third Avenue, which was then at the northern fringes of the city. (Note: Union Square, eventually built one block to the north, had not yet been begun, as shown in an engraving published the same year.) The well was immense—16 feet across and 112 feet deep—blasted largely through rock, resulting in a quarry of over 175,000 gallons of water. A steam engine had the capacity to lift nearly half a million gallons a day. An octagonal iron tank, 43 feet in diameter and 20 feet high was installed atop a 27-foot-high stone tower. Mains under Broadway and the Bowery delivered the water to hydrants on Pearl, William, Hudson, and a dozen other major streets, in six-, ten-, and twelve-inch pipes, delivering water to a height of 60 feet above the highest streets.

=== Old and New Croton Aqueducts ===
The city's first aqueduct, the Croton Aqueduct, was built between 1837 and 1842 from the Croton River in Westchester County down to Manhattan, a distance of 41 miles (66 km). The aqueduct was supported by the Old Croton Dam. The Old Croton Aqueduct's capacity was around 90 million gallons per day. To meet the city's growing needs, the city started construction of the New Croton Aqueduct in 1885. The new aqueduct opened for operation in 1890 with a capacity of 300 million gallons per day. The New Croton Dam was added in 1906. The Old Croton Aqueduct continued supplying water to the city until 1955 and closed in 1965.

=== Catskill Aqueduct ===
In 1905, the city's newly established Board of Water Supply launched the Catskill Aqueduct project, which would play an additional role in supplying the city's ever-growing population of residents and visitors. Construction of the system began in 1907. Portions of the Catskill system began operation in 1916, and the overall system of dams, reservoirs and tunnels was complete by 1924. The Schoharie Reservoir was added to the system and began operation in 1926. The Catskill system has an operational capacity of approximately 850 million gallons per day. Within the city's overall water system, the Catskill Aqueduct is the furthest away from the city, approximately 125 miles (201 km).

=== Delaware Aqueduct ===
The Board of Water Supply submitted a request to the Board of Estimate and Apportionment in 1927 to use the Delaware River as an additional water source for New York City. Even though the request was approved, the Delaware Aqueduct project was delayed due to a Supreme Court case filed by the State of New Jersey (with intervention in the case by the Government of Pennsylvania) to prevent the State of New York from using the Delaware River as a water source. New York won the case in May 1931. Construction of the Delaware Aqueduct began in March 1937. The aqueduct was completed in 1944. From 1950 to 1964, Rondout, Neversink, Pepacton and Cannonsville reservoirs were established successively to complete the Delaware System. The Delaware Aqueduct supports half of the whole city's water usage by supplying more than 500 million gallons of water daily.

== Responsible agencies ==
Responsibility for the city water supply is shared among three institutions: the New York City Department of Environmental Protection (DEP), which operates and maintains the system and is responsible for investment planning; the New York City Municipal Water Finance Authority (NYW), which raises debt financing in the market to underwrite the system's costs; and the Water Board, which sets rates and collects user payments.

=== New York City Department of Environmental Protection ===
The DEP has a workforce of over 7,000 employees. It includes three bureaus in charge of, respectively, the upstate water supply system, New York City's water and sewer operations, and wastewater treatment:

- The Bureau of Water Supply manages, operates, and protects New York City's upstate water supply system to ensure the delivery of a sufficient quantity of high quality drinking water. The Bureau is also responsible for the overall management and implementation of the city's $1.5 billion Watershed Protection Program.
- The Bureau of Water and Sewer Operations operates and maintains the water supply and sewerage system. It is also responsible for the operation of the Staten Island Bluebelt, a natural alternative to storm sewers, which occupies approximately 15 square miles (39 km^{2}) of land in the South Richmond area of Staten Island. This project preserves streams, ponds and other wetland ("bluebelt") areas, allowing them to perform their natural function of conveying, storing and filtering storm water.
- The Bureau of Wastewater Treatment operates 14 water pollution control plants treating an average of 1.5 billion US gal (5.7 million m^{3}) of wastewater a day; 95 wastewater pump stations; eight dewatering facilities; 490 sewer regulators; and 7,000 miles (11,000 km) of intercepting sewers.

=== New York City Municipal Water Finance Authority ===
The NYW finances the capital needs of the water and sewer system of the city through the issuance of bonds, commercial paper, and other debt instruments. It is a public-benefit corporation created in 1985 pursuant to the New York City Municipal Water Finance Authority Act. The authority is administered by a seven-member Board of Directors. Four of the members are ex officio members: the Commissioner of Environmental Protection of the City, the Director of Management and Budget of the City, the Commissioner of Finance of the City, and the Commissioner of Environmental Conservation of the State. The remaining three members are public appointments: two by the Mayor, and one by the Governor.

=== New York City Water Board ===
The New York City Water Board was established in 1905. It sets water and sewer rates for New York City sufficient to pay the costs of operating and financing the system, and collects user payments from customers for services provided by the water and wastewater utility systems of the City of New York. The five board members are appointed to two-year terms by the mayor.

== Infrastructure ==
New York City's water system consists of aqueducts, distribution pipes, reservoirs, and water tunnels that channel drinking water to residents and visitors. A comprehensive raised-relief map of the system is on display at the Queens Museum of Art. Until the early 21st century, some places in southeastern Queens received their water from local wells of the former Jamaica Water Supply Company.

=== Reservoirs and aqueducts ===
The water system has a storage capacity of 550 billion US gal (2.1 billion m^{3}) and provides over 1.2 billion US gal (4.5 million m^{3}) per day of drinking water to more than eight million city residents, and another one million users in four upstate counties bordering on the system. Three separate sub-systems, each consisting of aqueducts and reservoirs, bring water from Upstate New York to New York City:

- The New Croton Aqueduct, completed in 1890, brings water from the New Croton Reservoir in Westchester and Putnam counties.
- The Catskill Aqueduct, completed in 1916, is significantly larger than New Croton and brings water from two reservoirs in the eastern Catskill Mountains.
- The Delaware Aqueduct, completed in 1945, taps tributaries of the Delaware River in the western Catskill Mountains and provides approximately half of New York City's water supply.

The latter two aqueducts provide 90% of New York City's drinking water, and the watershed for these aqueducts extends a combined 1 million acres (400,000 ha). Two-fifths of the watershed is owned by the New York City, state, or local governments, or by private conservancies. The rest of the watershed is private property that is closely monitored for pollutants; development upon this land is restricted. The DEP has purchased or protected over 130,000 acres (53,000 ha) of private land since 1997 through its Land Acquisition Program. Water from both aqueducts is stored first in the large Kensico Reservoir and subsequently in the much smaller Hillview Reservoir closer to the city. In 2025 the city announced the purchase of additional land near the Kensico Reservoir.

The water is monitored by robotic buoys that measure temperature as well as pH, nutrient, and microbial levels in the reservoirs. A computer system then analyzes the measurements and makes predictions for the water quality. In 2015, the buoys took 1.9 million measurements of the water in the reservoirs.

=== Disinfection and filtration ===
The water in the Kensico Reservoir flows to the Catskill-Delaware Water Ultraviolet Disinfection Facility, located in Westchester County. Although the city water system uses chlorination as a basic disinfection technology, the ultraviolet disinfection (UV) facility was built to control microorganisms such as giardia and cryptosporidium which are resistant to chlorine treatment. Ultraviolet treatment was seen as the least risky way to control such microorganisms and avoid higher levels of chlorination, which can lead to unintended health effects. The UV facility opened on October 8, 2013, and was built at a cost of $1.6 billion. The compound is the largest ultraviolet germicidal irradiation plant in the world; it contains 56 UV reactors designed to treat up to 2.2 billion US gal (8.3 billion L) per day.

While all of the city's water goes through the disinfection process, only 10% of the water is filtered. The Croton Water Filtration Plant was built to address constant turbidity problems that are specific to the Croton water supply system. The plant was completed in 2015 at a cost of over $3 billion. The facility was constructed 160 feet (49 m) under Van Cortlandt Park in the Bronx and filters water delivered by the New Croton Aqueduct. The 830-by-550-foot (250 by 170 m) plant, which is bigger than Yankee Stadium, is the city's first water filtration plant. The plant was built after the U.S. Environmental Protection Agency (EPA), the U.S. Department of Justice and the State of New York filed suit against the city in 1997 for violating the Safe Drinking Water Act and the New York State Sanitary Code. The city government agreed to rehabilitate the New Croton Aqueduct and build a filtration plant. The plant includes a UV disinfection system. The city had been studying possible sites for such a plant for more than 20 years in both the Bronx and Westchester.

=== Tunnels and distribution system ===
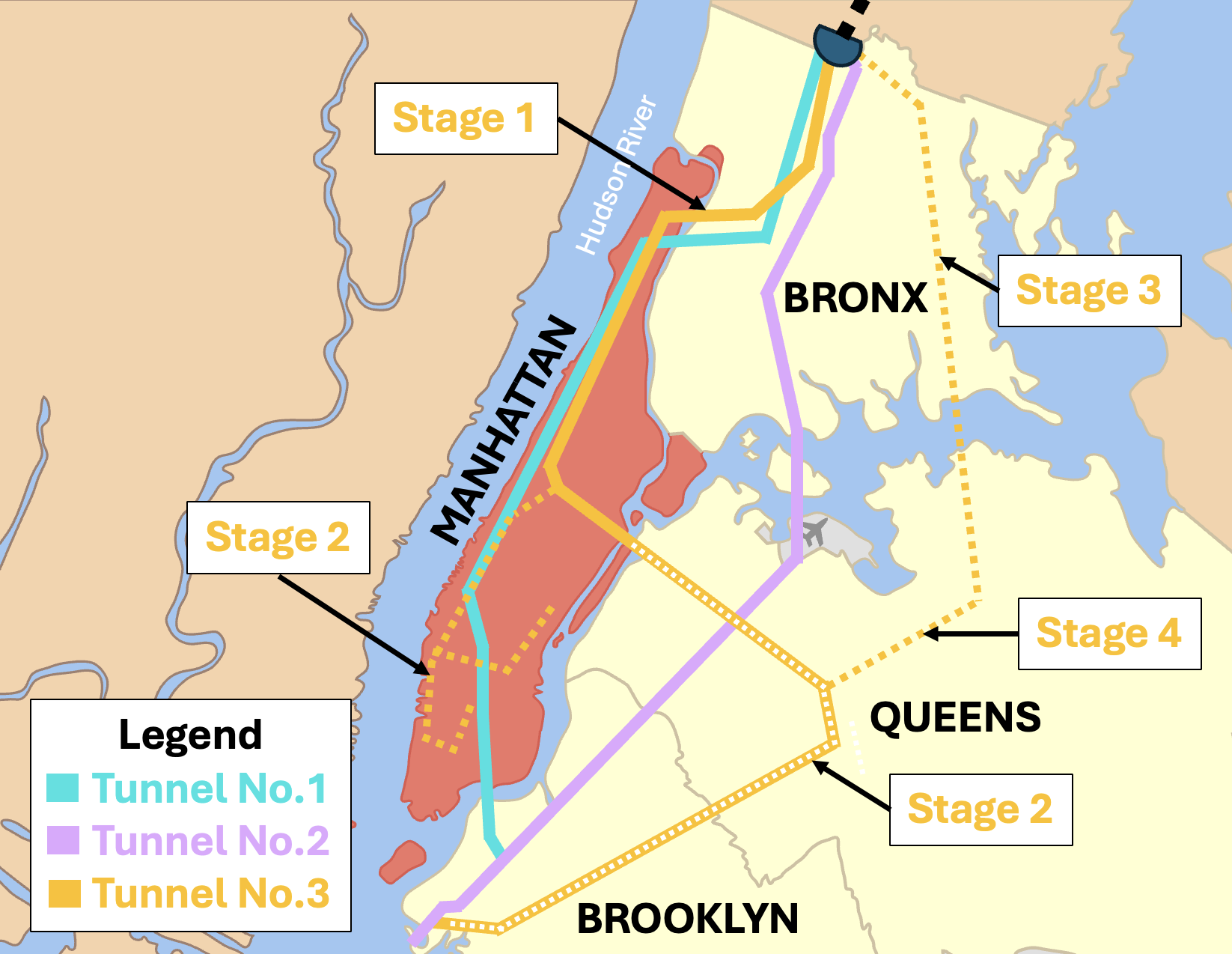
Map of water supply tunnels

==== Tunnels ====
From the Hillview reservoir water flows by gravity to three tunnels under New York City. Water rises again to the surface under natural pressure, through a number of shafts. The three tunnels are:

1. New York City Water Tunnel No. 1, completed in 1917. It runs from the Hillview Reservoir under the central Bronx, Harlem River, West Side, Midtown, and Lower East Side of Manhattan, and under the East River to Brooklyn where it connects to Tunnel 2. It is expected to undergo extensive repairs upon completion of Tunnel No. 3.
2. New York City Water Tunnel No. 2, completed in 1935. It runs from the Hillview Reservoir under the central Bronx, East River, and western Queens to Brooklyn, where it connects to Tunnel 1 and the Richmond Tunnel to Staten Island. When completed, it was the longest large diameter water tunnel in the world.
3. The partially-completed New York City Water Tunnel No. 3, the largest capital construction project in New York City's history (see Ongoing repairs and upgrades). It starts at Hillview Reservoir in Yonkers, New York then crosses under Central Park in Manhattan, to reach Fifth Avenue at 78th Street. From there it runs under the East River and Roosevelt Island into Astoria, Queens. From there it will continue on to Brooklyn.

==== Distribution ====
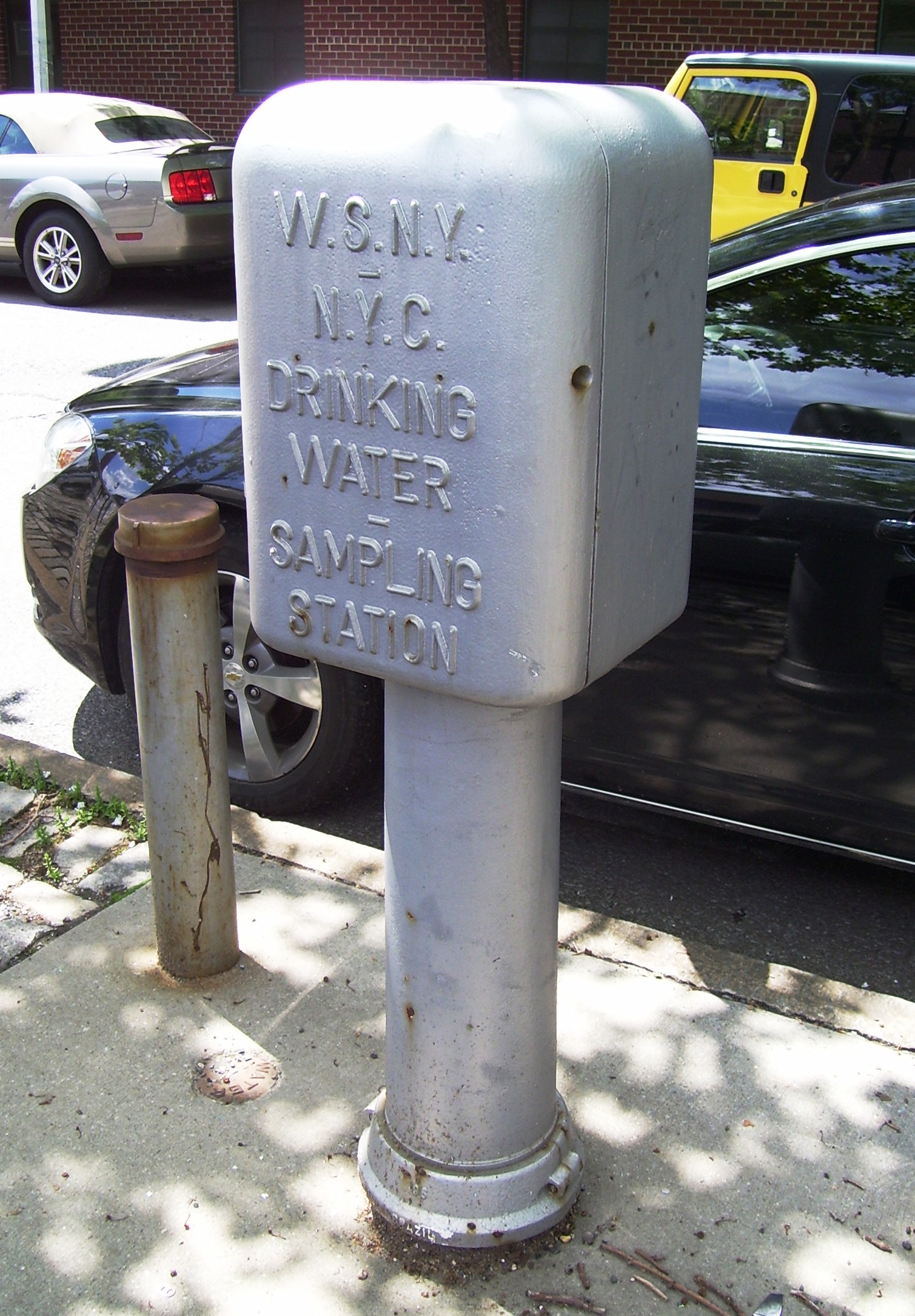
Water sampling station located on a sidewalk in Manhattan

The distribution system is made up of an extensive grid of water mains stretching approximately 6,800 miles (10,900 km). As of 2015, it costs the city $140 million to maintain these mains.

There are 965 water sampling stations in New York City. The water-sampling system has been in use since 1997. The stations are small cast-iron boxes with spigots inside them, raised 4.5 feet (1.4 m) above the ground. Scientists from the city measure the water every day, totaling over 1,300 stations per month, at up to 546 locations. The samples are then tested for microorganisms, toxic chemicals, and other contaminants. In 2015, the DEP performed 383,000 tests on 31,700 water samples.

== Ongoing repairs and upgrades ==
Leaks were first discovered in the Delaware Aqueduct in 1988, with water losses up to 36 million US gallons (140,000 m^{3}) per day. In 2010 the city announced a plan for a major repair project for the aqueduct. In 2013 work began on a 2.5-mile (4.0 km) bypass tunnel under the Hudson River, the largest construction project in DEP's history. The tunnel construction completed in 2019 and the overall bypass project is expected to be complete in 2027.

In 2018, the city announced a US$1 billion investment to protect the integrity of its municipal water system and to maintain the purity of its unfiltered water supply. A significant portion of the investment will be used to prevent the turbidity that might be caused by climate change, including relocating the residents and cleaning up decaying plantations near the watersheds, and conducting flood-preventing research for infrastructures near the watersheds. According to Eric A. Goldstein, a senior lawyer for the Natural Resources Defense Council: "This is no time to let down one’s guard".

The construction of Water Tunnel No. 3 is intended to provide the city with a critical third connection to its upstate supply system so that the city can, for the first time, close tunnels No. 1 and No. 2 for repair. The tunnel will eventually be more than 60 miles (97 km) long. Construction began in 1970 and portions of the tunnel opened in 1998 and 2013. The remaining sections are expected to be complete by 2032.

== See also ==
- Brooklyn Waterworks
- Environmental issues in New York City
- High Bridge (New York City) – part of the old Croton Aqueduct system
- Integrated urban water management
- Water supply and sanitation in the United States
- Water supply network
