= Marty Pottenger =

Performance artist

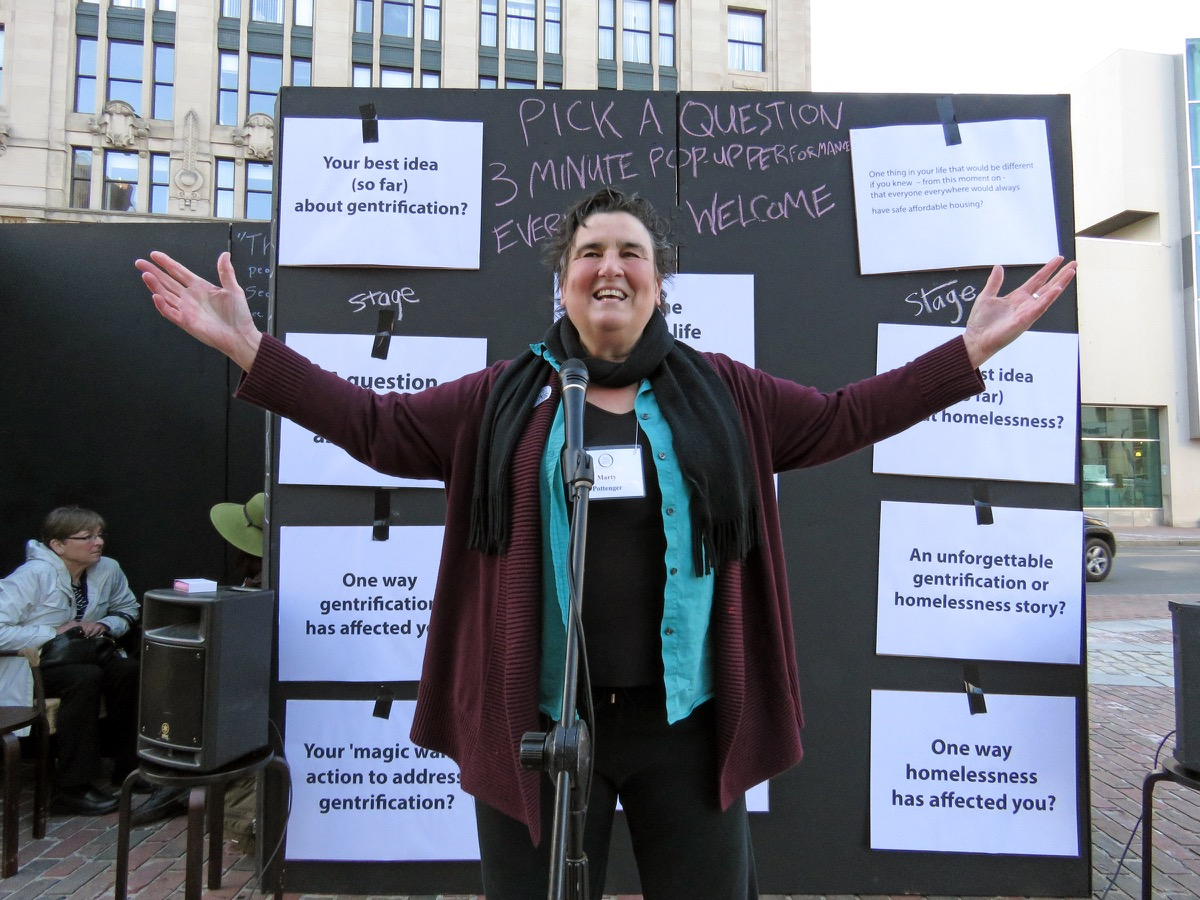
- Born: March 30, 1952 (age 74); Chicago, Illinois
- Occupation: Performance artist
- Notable work: City Water Tunnel #3 What It's Like To Be a Man Art At Work
- Awards: Obie 1996 New York Foundation for the Arts Fellowships: 1992, 1994, 1999 MacDowell Colony Fellow 2016

Marty Pottenger (born March 30, 1952, in Chicago, Illinois) is an American playwright, performer, activist, and community organizer known for her interdisciplinary work that blends art, social justice, and civic engagement.

Pottenger is perhaps best known for her pioneering work in the field of “arts-based civic engagement,” where she combines performance, public art, and dialogue to foster understanding and action on issues ranging from urban renewal to police reform. Her work has been described as a bridge between creative expression and community activism, creating platforms for marginalized voices and enabling people to see their shared humanity in new ways.

Pottenger was a founding member of Heresies: A Feminist Publication on Art and Politics. She was the writer, artistic director, and solo performer of City Water Tunnel #3 a multi-media Obie-winning play and community art project about the building of the largest (non-defense) public works project in the Western Hemisphere.

Pottenger is also the founder of Art At Work (originally Terra Moto Inc.), a groundbreaking public art initiative piloted with the City of Portland, Maine's departments, unions and elected officials to improve municipal government through strategic arts projects in collaboration with artists and community members. Pottenger served as a consultant with the city of Boston, MA on an Art At Work inspired project called Boston AIR.

She is currently the Executive & Artistic Director of Art At Work (originally Terra Moto Inc.), a multidisciplinary arts organization.

Pottenger gave a TED Talk at TEDxDirigo about her work.

== Notable work ==
=== Art At Work ===
Pottenger is the Founder / Director of Art At Work (2007–2015), a national initiative piloted with the City of Portland, Maine's departments, unions and elected officials to improve municipal government through strategic arts projects. In response to the success of her community performance project "home land security," the City of Portland, Maine asked Pottenger to develop a citywide initiative that would use the tools of stories, art and performance to address long-standing issues of discrimination and perceived prejudice within the city government and the school system, with the objective of increasing equity. Art At Work (AAW) was created as the first US city/school/community partnership to develop ways for creativity and the arts to effectively address discrimination, inequity, and a growing sense of disenfranchisement between multiple sectors of the city.

Over the next eight years, Art At Work's ideas were re-created in seven cities and two countries, training hundreds of artists for residencies in city departments, unions, and neighborhoods putting people at the center of creative placemaking. In 2013, Pottenger launched Art At Work Holyoke in Holyoke MA.

Most notable of Art At Work's fifteen projects:

- Meeting Place, an NEA Our Town project, to increase diversity, with strategic arts-based programs partnering professional artists and city residents in four neighborhood associations in Portland, Maine;
- Radio Calls, an original performance written & directed by Pottenger for police officers in Portland, Maine;
- Police Poetry & Photography Calendars, a project involving ten Portland, Maine police officers and detectives working to creating a police calendar by partnering with ten local poets & photographers.

== Productions and performances ==
=== #PHILADELPHIASAVESEARTH (2015 - 2016) ===
A theatrical piece (currently in production) written and directed by Pottenger and commissioned by The Painted Bride Arts Center as one of three artist residencies in the project "Re-PLACE-ing Philadelphia". #PhiladelphiaSavesEarth is a community arts project that explores the impacts of climate change and the city's responses. It premieres on Earth Day 2016 April 22 to the 24th at The Painted Bride Arts Center in Philly. Funding in part from the Pew Center for Arts & Heritage.

It feels almost impossible to face let alone act on behalf of the planet in light of the scale and estimated impacts of global warming. But by experiencing our collective power, we can face our fears, express our grief, locate our courage, take note of our history, and together take decisive action. Theater lives in that collective consciousness.

— Marty Pottenger

=== Hearts, Minds & Homes (2015 – 2016) ===
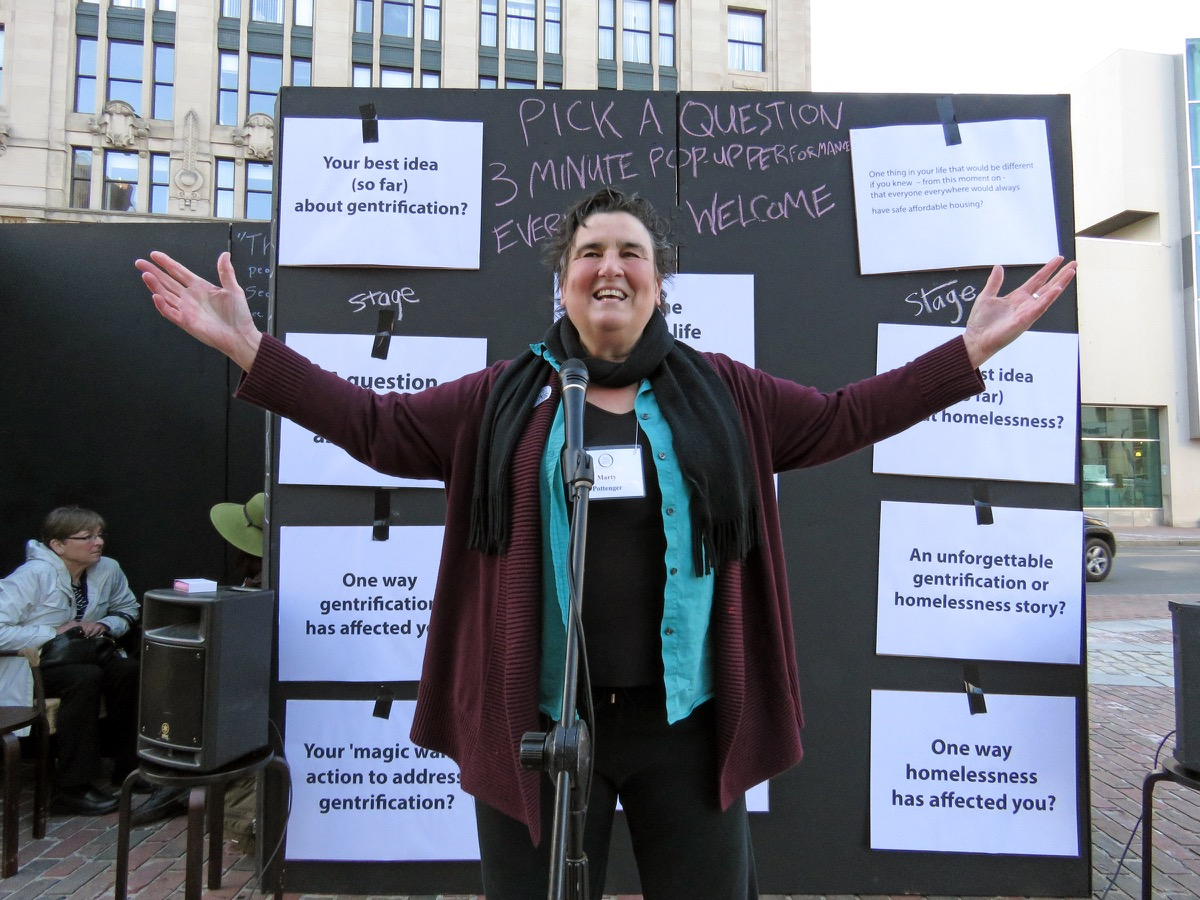
Pottenger at a Hearts, Minds, Homes public event in Portland, Maine in 2015.

Pottenger is writer, director for this series of public dialogues and theatrical performances focused on creating civic dialogue about gentrification and homelessness in Maine's largest city, Portland, Maine. Pottenger has said she created Hearts, Minds & Homes in response to Portland's housing crisis with a 0% vacancy rate and the second-highest increase in rents in the nation. "When you use art as the basis of a civic dialogue like this, people are able to talk more directly with each other and think more flexibly, without the understandable need to be defensive. Art introduces a sense of collaborative exploration," Pottenger said. Performances were followed by the launching of a city-led task force aimed at addressing and coming up with solutions to the housing crisis.

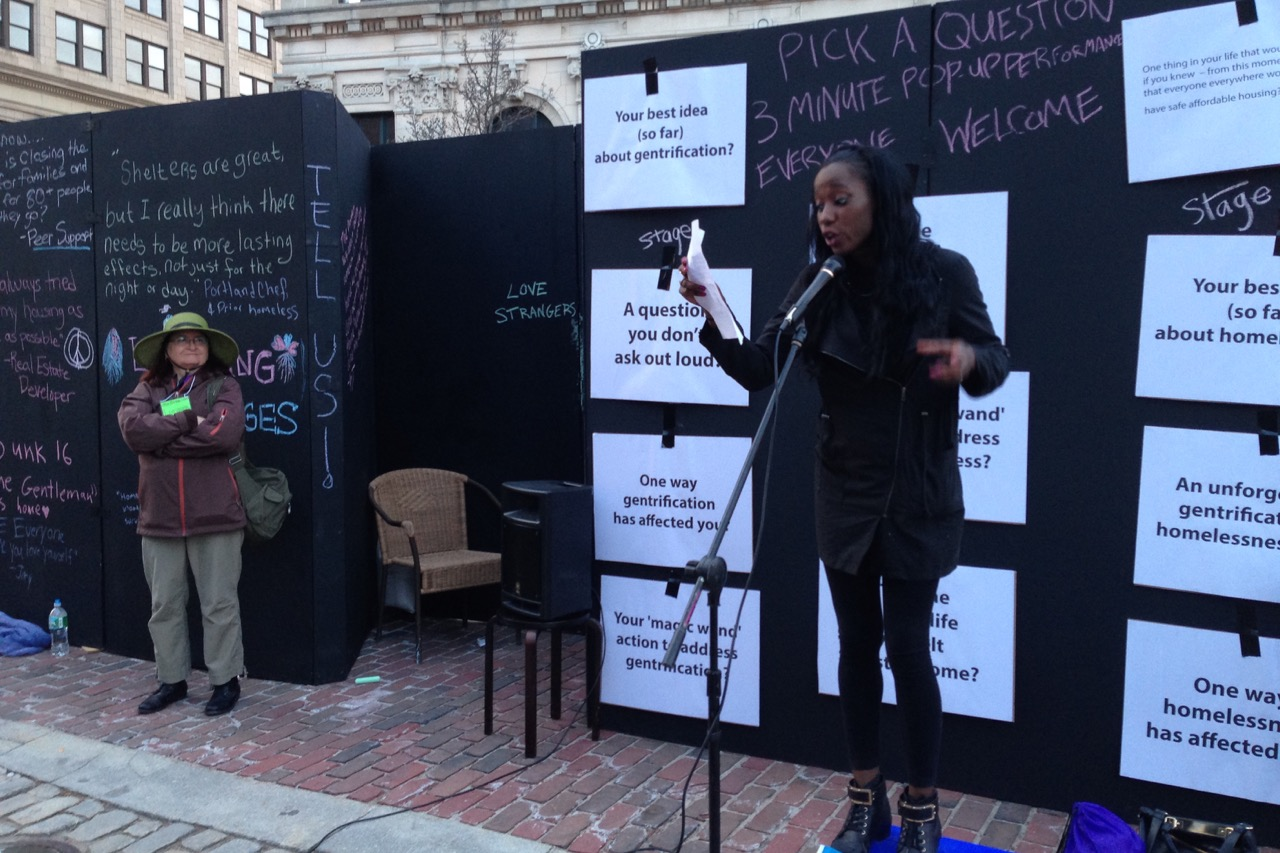
Hearts, Minds, Homes in Portland Maine in 2015.

In 2015, Hearts, Minds & Homes presented a free public interactive event in downtown Portland, Maine with: an art installation, Tiny House Models, On-the-Street Listening Exchanges & Pop-up Performances in collaboration with University of Southern Maine art and social work students, University of Maine Augusta architecture students, and Waterville Maine Mid Maine Homeless Shelter. Funded by the NEA, Creative Portland, and the City of Portland.

All The Way Home Veteran's Story Exchange (2014–2015)

A participatory story exchange project throughout Southern Maine created, produced and directed by Marty Pottenger in collaboration with an advisory team including Portland Police Chief Mike Sauschuck (former Marine); Major Cliff Trott, Director of Portland Vets Center/Vermont National Guard, SSG. Heath John Bouffard, Maine National Guard.

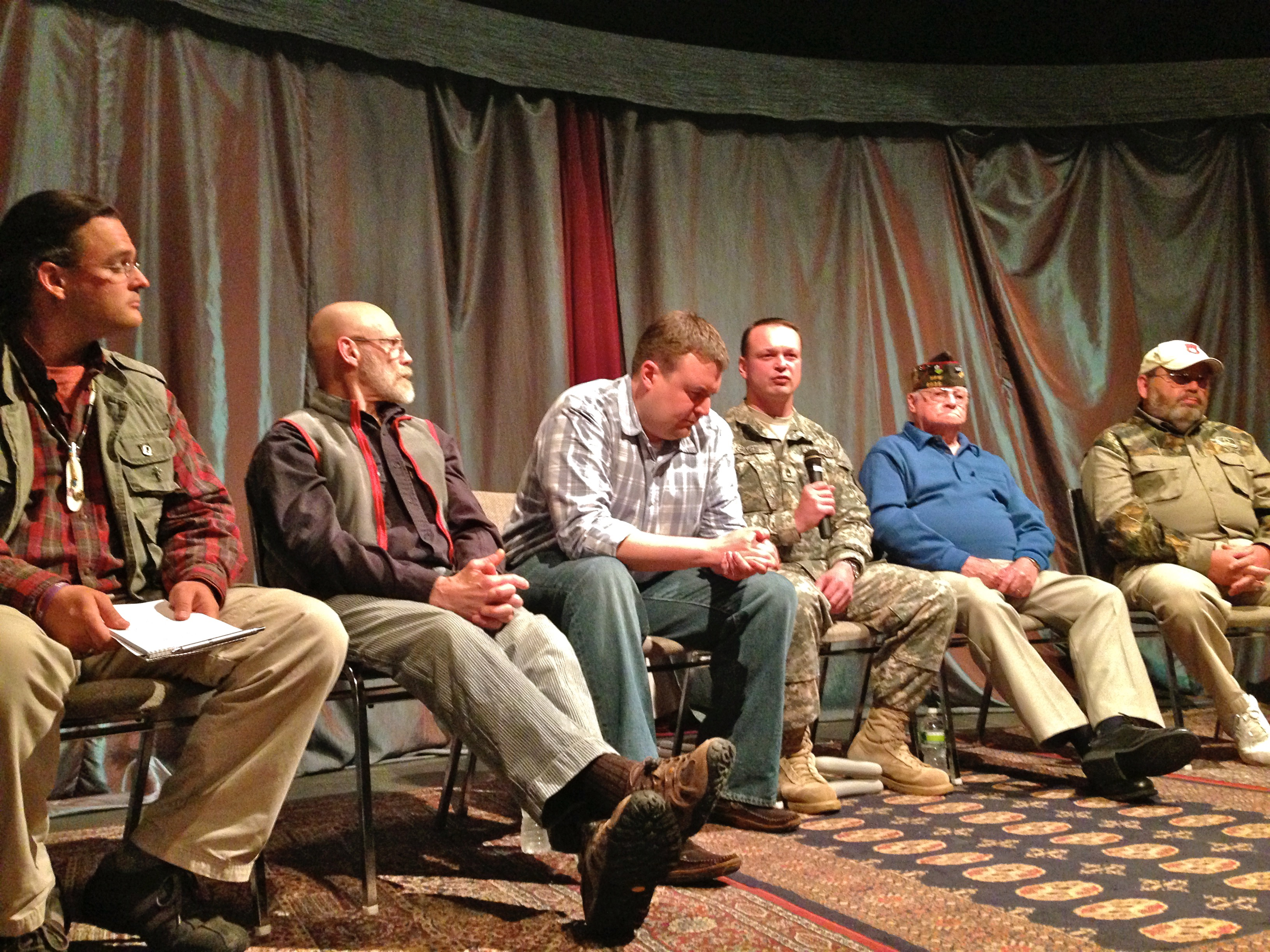
Veterans participating in All the Way Home in 2015.

All The Way Home engaged both veteran and active duty military personnel who have served in Iraq and/or Afghanistan and are battling PTSD. Veterans were partnered with a professional graphic novelist/comic book artist to collaborate with Pottenger to create individual comic books/graphic novels of each veteran's life story. Project partners include Maine Military Community Network, Portland Vets Center, 262nd Battalion of Maine National Guard, among others. NEA Chairman Jane Chu and Maine Congresswoman Chellie Pingree attended an All The Way Home Veterans Story Exchange in 2015. All The Way Home will culminate in a series of performances incorporating stories from comic books.

Meeting Place (2012 – 2013)

Art At Work's citywide assessment in 2012 confirmed that none of Portland's 14 neighborhood associations reflected the diversity of the residents Pottenger created Meeting Place in Portland, Maine. It was a year-long project with 4 key neighborhoods to increase the odds that Portland's neighborhood associations might reflect the diversity of their neighborhoods. Meeting Place was selected by the National Endowment of the Arts as one of five nationally featured creative place-making Our Town grant projects.

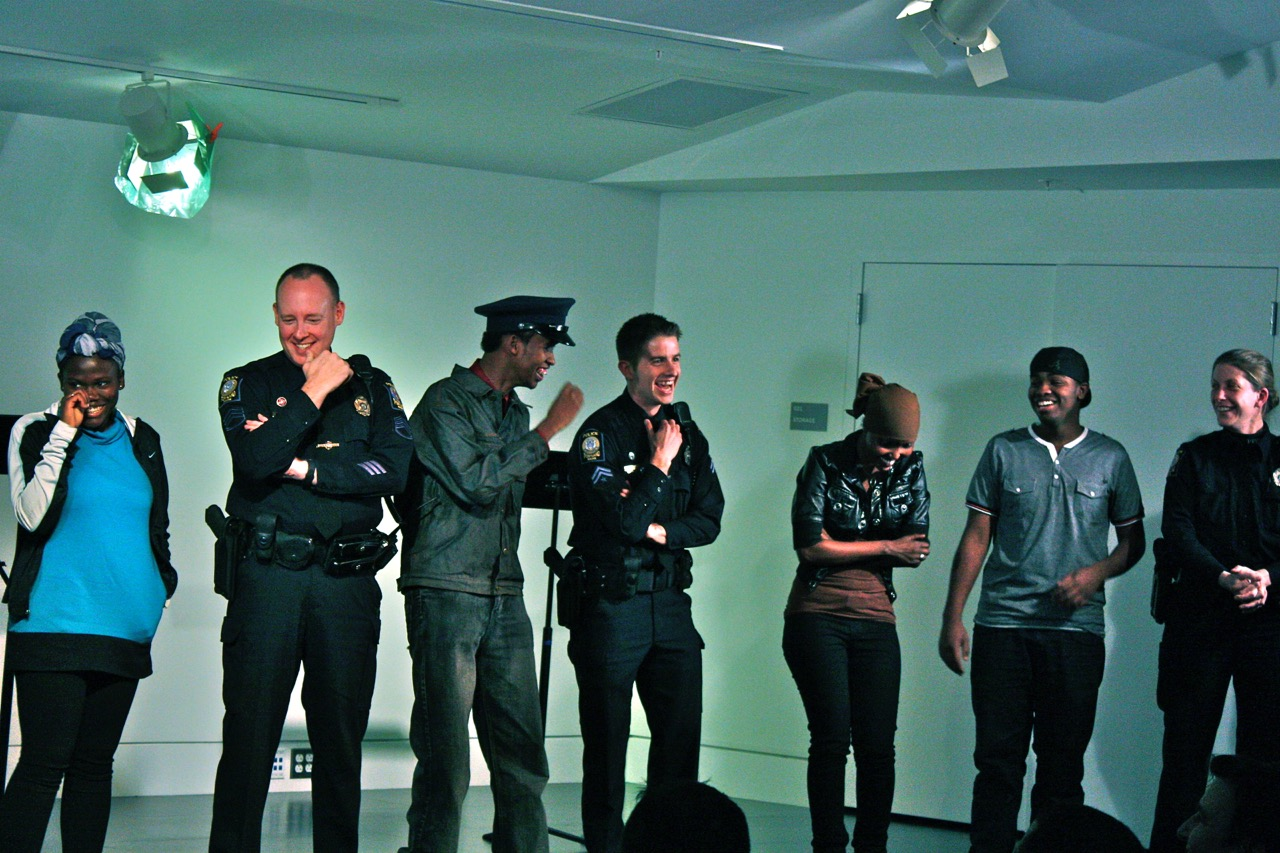
Forest City Times (2010) students and officers.

Forest City Times: Radio Calls & The Weeping City (2010)

An original performance by five police officers and performed at each of Portland, Maine's 3 high schools, as well as for the public. Written, produced, and directed by Pottenger, Radio Calls was initiated by Portland's Police Chief (James Craig) in response to escalating incidents of youth throwing rocks and bottles at police officers after a police shooting. Before accepting the invitation, Pottenger negotiated Chief's permission to work with police officers 'more likely to cross a line' as part of the Radio Calls ride-alongs and workshops–in order to insure that the work's transformative power was directed at both the police force and the youth.

Who We Are (2008)

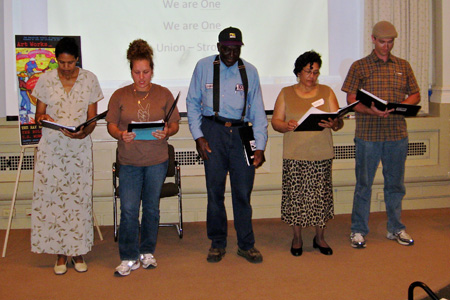
Participants in Pottenger's 2008 Who We Are.

Pottenger wrote and directed this performance about the lives and work of 8 members of Local 200, Service Employees International Union at Syracuse University. It was performed by the members themselves. Custodians, food service and maintenance workers, working in collaboration with Pottenger, developed and performed in a live piece about their lives and work. The original performance is now a part of First Year Student Orientation Week at SU. After viewing excerpts of the performance at a Labor & Arts Symposium, Chancellor Nancy Cantor reversed a long-standing policy of hiring nonunion construction companies, a policy the union had been fighting to win for years.

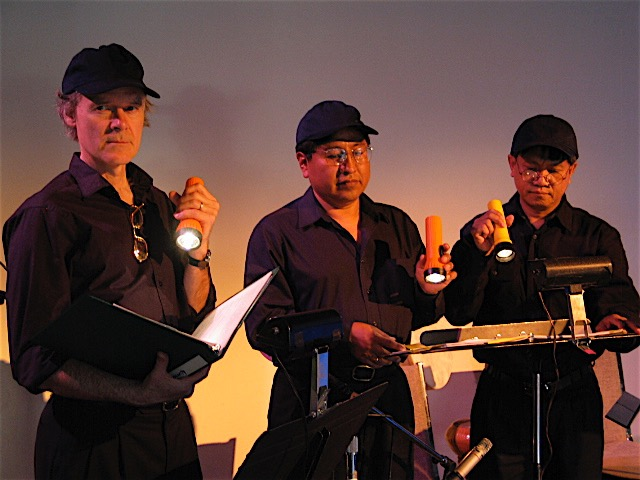
Musicians/border patrol performers in Pottenger's 2005 home land security.

Home Land Security (2005 – 2006)

After an unprecedented Border Patrol raid targeting the immigrant community of Portland Maine, the Center for Cultural Exchange (Portland Maine) commissioned Pottenger to create an arts project in collaboration with people affected by the raid. home land security was a two-year community performance project, by Pottenger, focused on the city after 9/11. It was written from story circles and interviews. The Portland Phoenix wrote, "Though this show wasn't just about anxiety (many monologues stressed the comfort of Portland's community and the beauty of Maine land. Lucien, among others, provided big-hearted comic relief), it certainly didn't shrink from its participants' fears and outrage, or from providing a truly balanced survey of community."

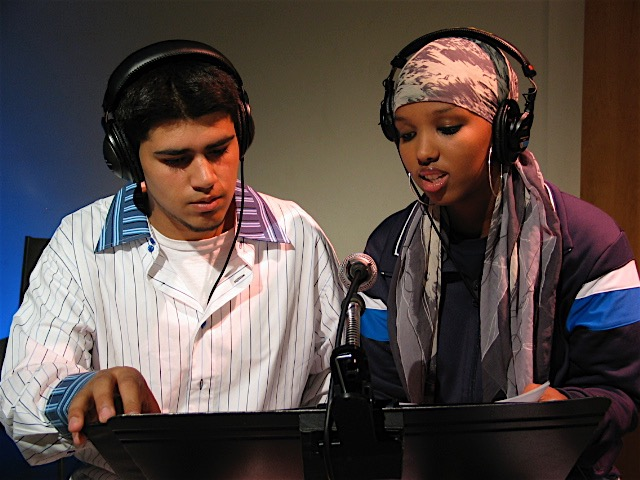
Radio announcers in Pottenger's 2005 home land security.

Abundance (2000 – 2004)

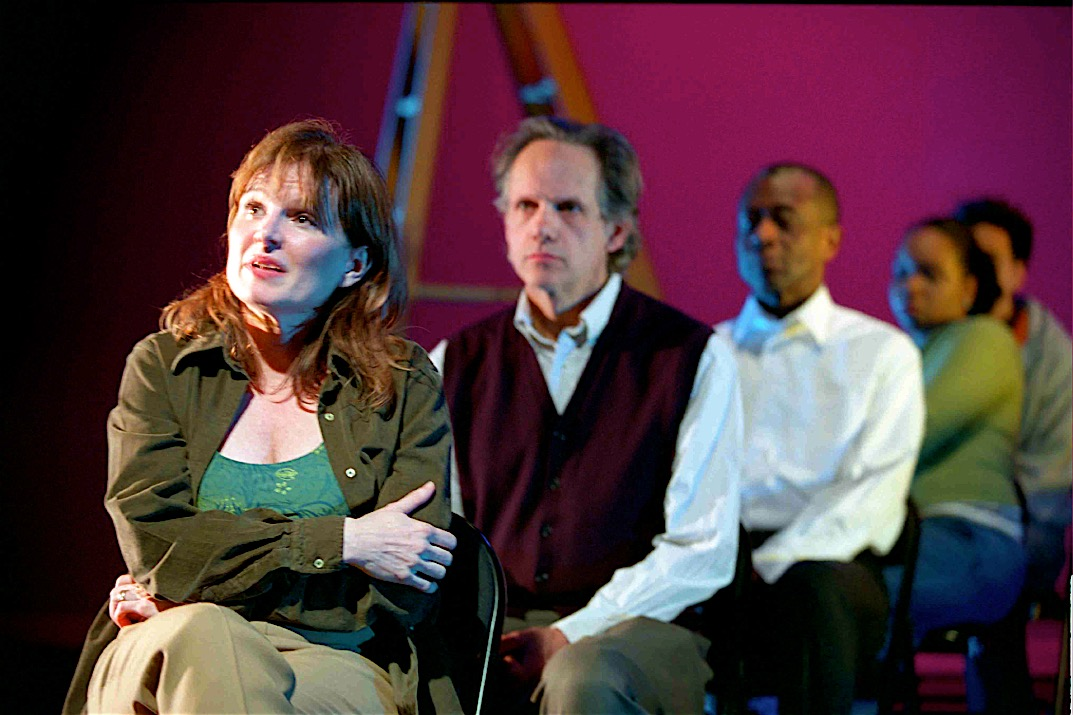
Pottenger's Abundance.

Abundance was a national community performance project written and 5-actor play directed by Pottenger about money and America. "Elegant and troubling ... one of 2003's Ten Best Plays," wrote the Seattle Post Intelligencer. The Abundance Project included four years of in depth interviews with 30 multi-millionaires and 30 minimum wage-earners throughout the United States, and a monthly NYC dialogue that included undocumented workers, millionaires and the people in between. The play, co-directed by Steve Bailey, was written in part with text from these interviews and dialogues. It toured to Seattle, Houston, Burlington, Washington DC, Providence, Philadelphia and NYC.

Winning the Peace (1999)

Pottenger created this play from over 400 collected emails from the people in Kosova and Serbia during the war. It was co-produced with The Working Theatre and Cornell University's School of Industrial and Labor Relations and debuted at St. Peter's Church in New York City. It was read by 35 New York leading citizens from theater, dance, religion, the military, unions, legal professions, publishing, education and business and had music by Terry Dame.

City Water Tunnel #3 (1996 – 1999)

City Water Tunnel #3, which earned Pottenger an Obie Theater award in 1996, chronicles the development of a $5 billion New York City water tunnel project, at the time the largest non-defense public works project in the Western hemisphere.

Constructions Stories (1991 - 1994)

Pottenger produced a series of stories about the construction trade, told while completing construction on stage, which debuted at the Dance Theater Workshop in New York NY in 1991. Construction Stories was work created by Pottenger, a construction worker herself for 20 years, to respond to the daily beauty and brutality of physical labor.

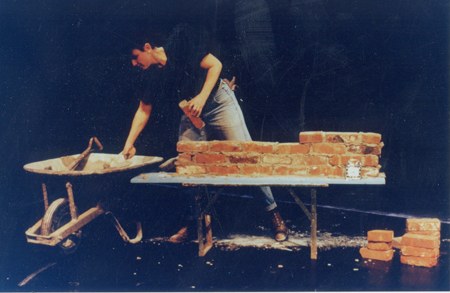
Pottenger in Construction Stories.

In addition to the Dance Theater Workshop, Pottenger performed the work at SUSHI Neo-Fest San Diego CA; Highways Los Angeles CA 1992; ICA London England 1993; Green Room Manchester England 1993; Theater Rhinoceros San Francisco CA 1994. Excerpts from construction Stories aired on NPR, KPFA, Canadian Broadcasting Corporation, & Voice of America.

"The work itself tells a story ... wry and poignant." — Wall Street Journal

The LA Weekly review describes the author's work as consisting of personal accounts of people and objects, while also addressing the social factors influencing these interactions. The publication characterizes the writing as detailed and focused on human experiences.

House Building Time (1989)

Conceived, choreographed, directed and produced by Pottenger to celebrate the 1st National Tradeswomen Conference, in Chicago Illinois in 1989. House Building Time was a 15-minute choreographed construction of a small house, including framing out the walls, windows and door, wiring an overhead light, plumbing water, and setting a roof of rafter trusses. It featured a team of working women, real carpenters, plumbers, electricians and laborers, all in yellow slickers.

High Performance wrote: "Pottenger transformed the attendees notion of 'artwork' by creating a performance piece that included real laborers, and she introduced others to the possibility of their own creativity."

What It's Like To Be A Man (1987)

Pottenger was playwright, director and solo performer in this 1987 piece. She combined music, stories, and dance to examine the condition of the lives of men. What It's Like to be a Man was performed at avant-garde New York City art space Franklin Furnace (1987, 1988) where it received a "Jerome Award." Pottenger also performed it at Pyramid Art Space, Rochester NY; Diverseworks, Houston TX with PS 122 Field Trips A census-taking, standup tragic comedy show that at times resembles an action-adventure magazine. A vast hys/torical survey of men's lives as men as told by the men themselves. The stories drawn from over 60 interviews include "Harry Belafonte, Genghis Khan, Kermit & Me," "Real Penis Stories," "Most-Best-Time-With-My-Dad" and "Slowly I Turn ..."

== Selected awards, honors, fellowships, and residencies ==
- City of Portland (Maine) Proclamation Recognizing Marty M. Pottenger – Sponsored by Mayor Michael F. Brennan / 2014

== Teaching ==
Since 1995, Pottenger has been invited by Theater, Dance, History and English Departments to lecture and teach workshops on Community Performance Theory & Practice including: Williams College, Emerson College, Virginia Tech, Dartmouth, University of Texas at Austin, University of Massachusetts Amherst, Jacob's Pillow, SFSU, San Francisco Art Institute, Mount Holyoke, Roanoke College, University of Kansas, School for Visual Arts, Dickinson College, George Mason University, Mills College and SUNY Albany, and SUNY Purchase. In 2002, the University of Roma, Sapienza held a Symposium on Pottenger's work, which included performance workshops, lectures by professors, and a performance of City Water Tunnel #3.

Pottenger was the founder of TheaterWorks! with The Working Theater in 2002, an initiative where union members develop performances about their experiences as workers, deepen connections, define issues and offer solutions. Participating organizations included Local 371 of social workers, Communication Workers of America (Local 1180), Garment Workers (UNITE), and Amalgamated Life Insurance workers. At the final performance of each class, labor leaders and politicians come making the imaginative reach of performance increasingly significant in the lives of working people.
