= Hillview Reservoir =

Reservoir in Yonkers, New York

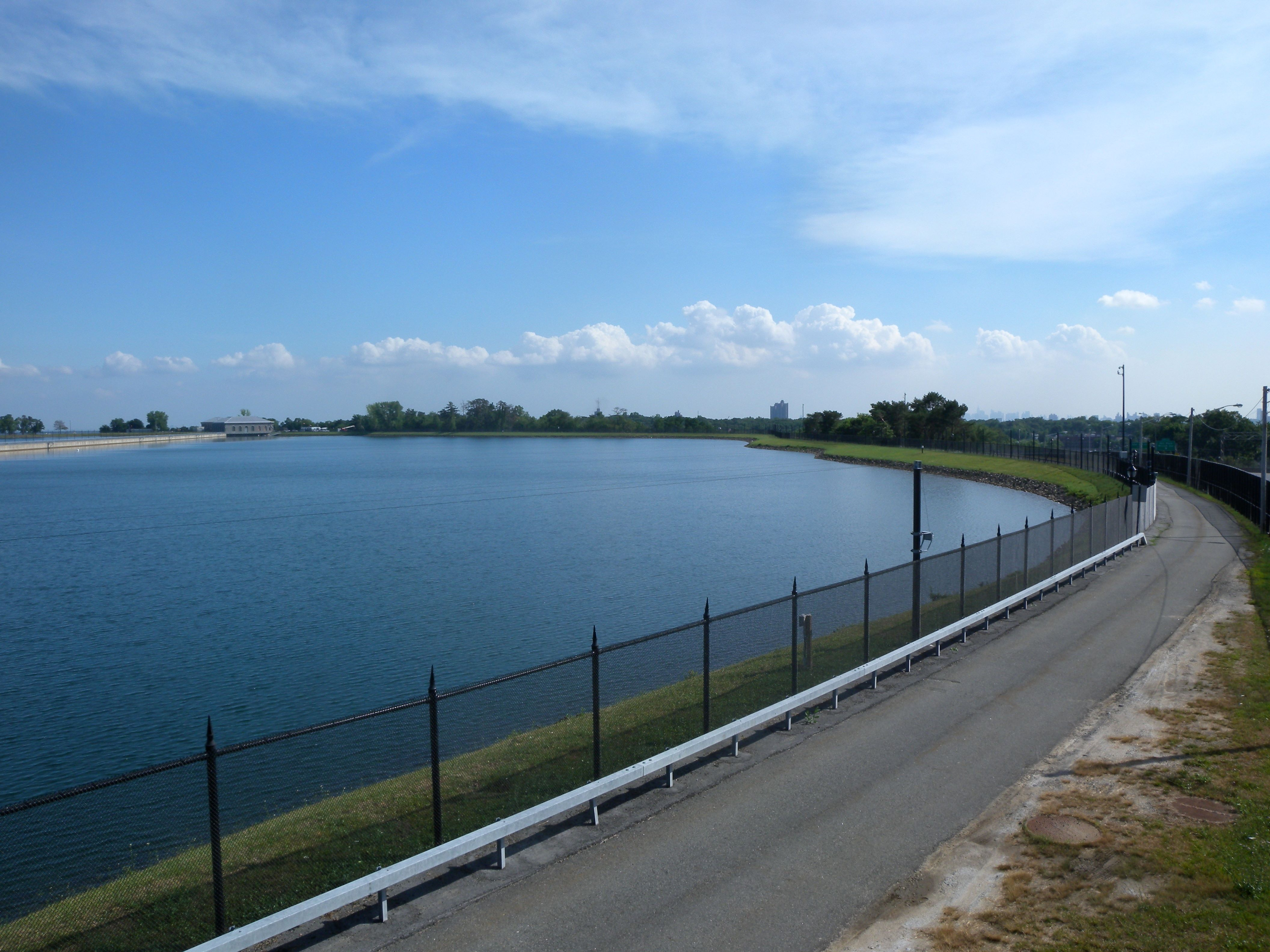
- Southwestern portion

- Location within New York Location within the United States
- Location: Westchester County, New York
- Coordinates: 40°54′44″N 73°52′9″W
- Type: reservoir
- Basin countries: United States
- Surface area: 90-acre (0.36 km^{2})
- Surface elevation: 90 m (300 ft)

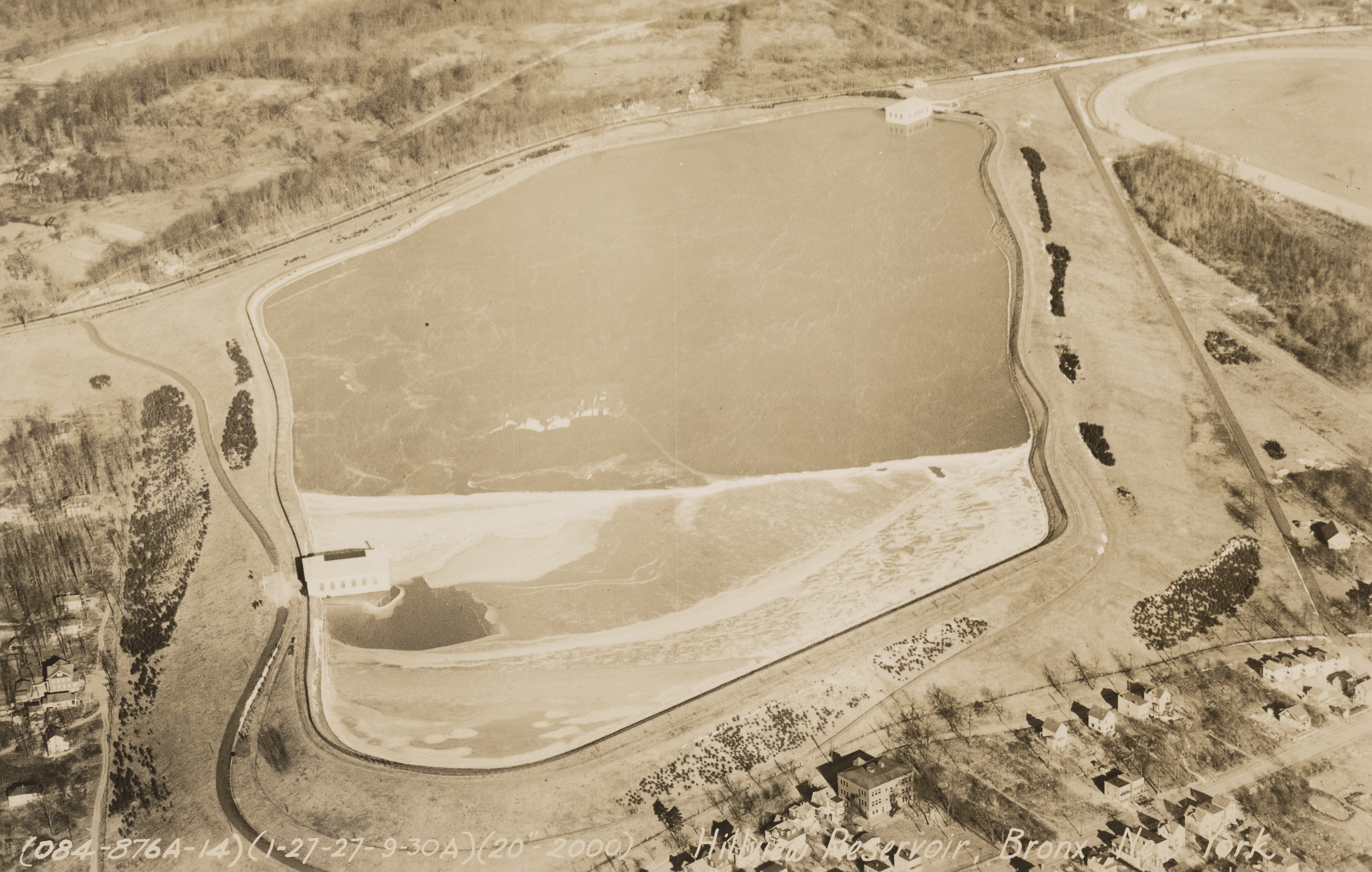
Aerial view of Hillview Reservoir, 1927

The Hillview Reservoir is a 90-acre (0.36 km^{2}) storage reservoir in southeastern Yonkers, New York. It was built within a six-year period from 1909–1915 by the New York City Board of Water Supply to receive water from the newly constructed Catskill Aqueduct, which drained water from the Ashokan Reservoir and sent it down into the Kensico Reservoir, where it would, in turn, be drained back into a continuation of the Catskill Aqueduct, and sent into the Hillview Reservoir. Frank E. Winsor was the engineer in charge of construction of both Hillview and Kensico as well as 32 miles (51 km) of the Catskill Aqueduct.

The reservoir itself has a maximum capacity of 900 million US gallons (3,400,000 m^{3}), and water from the reservoir is sent through New York City Water Tunnels No. 1 and No. 2. The plan for the New York City Water Tunnel No. 3 is to move water from the Kensico Reservoir, and send it directly into the Hillview Reservoir, and then into the rest of New York City. The reservoir itself does not impound a river, and is held up by walls on all sides.

On September 23, 1950, a seaplane that had encountered engine trouble attempted an emergency landing in the reservoir but instead crashed into Kimball Avenue. A month later, another seaplane made a successful emergency landing in the reservoir.

In 1993, city officials considered building a concrete cover over the reservoir to prevent excrement from seagulls contaminating the water with bacteria and viruses.

In March 2019, the New York City Department of Environmental Protection (DEP) made an agreement with the United States Environmental Protection Agency (EPA) to cover the reservoir by 2049 to comply with the Safe Drinking Water Act. They also agreed to enhance efforts to manage wildlife at the reservoir in the meantime, eliminating cliff swallow nests and capturing or killing waterfowl.

== See also ==
- List of reservoirs and dams in New York
- New York City water supply system
