= Delaware Aqueduct =

Aqueduct in New York

Coordinates: 41.282317°N 73.667908°W

Delaware Aqueduct, New York

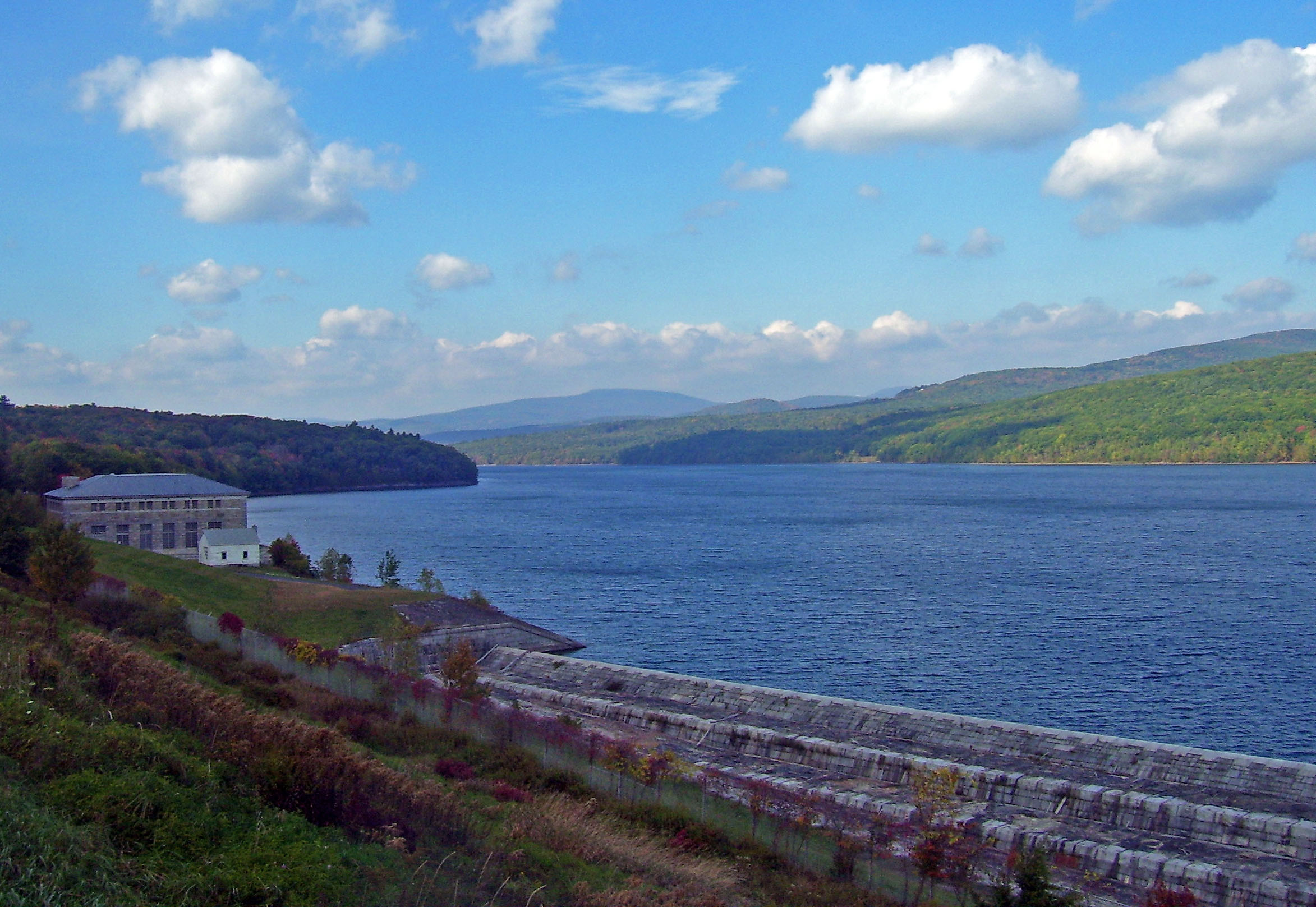
Rondout Reservoir is the central collection point for the Delaware Aqueduct, receiving the waters of the Cannonsville, Neversink, and Pepacton reservoirs

The Delaware Aqueduct is an aqueduct in the New York City water supply system. It takes water from the Rondout, Cannonsville, Neversink, and Pepacton reservoirs on the west bank of the Hudson River through the Chelsea Pump Station near Beacon, New York, then into the West Branch, Kensico, and Hillview reservoirs on the east bank, ending at Hillview in Yonkers, New York.

Built between 1939 and 1945, the Delaware Aqueduct carries about half of New York City's water supply of 1.3 billion US gallons (4,900,000 m^{3}) per day. At a minimum of 13.5 feet (4.1 m) diameter and 85 miles (137 km) long, it is the world's longest tunnel.

== Reservoirs and watersheds ==
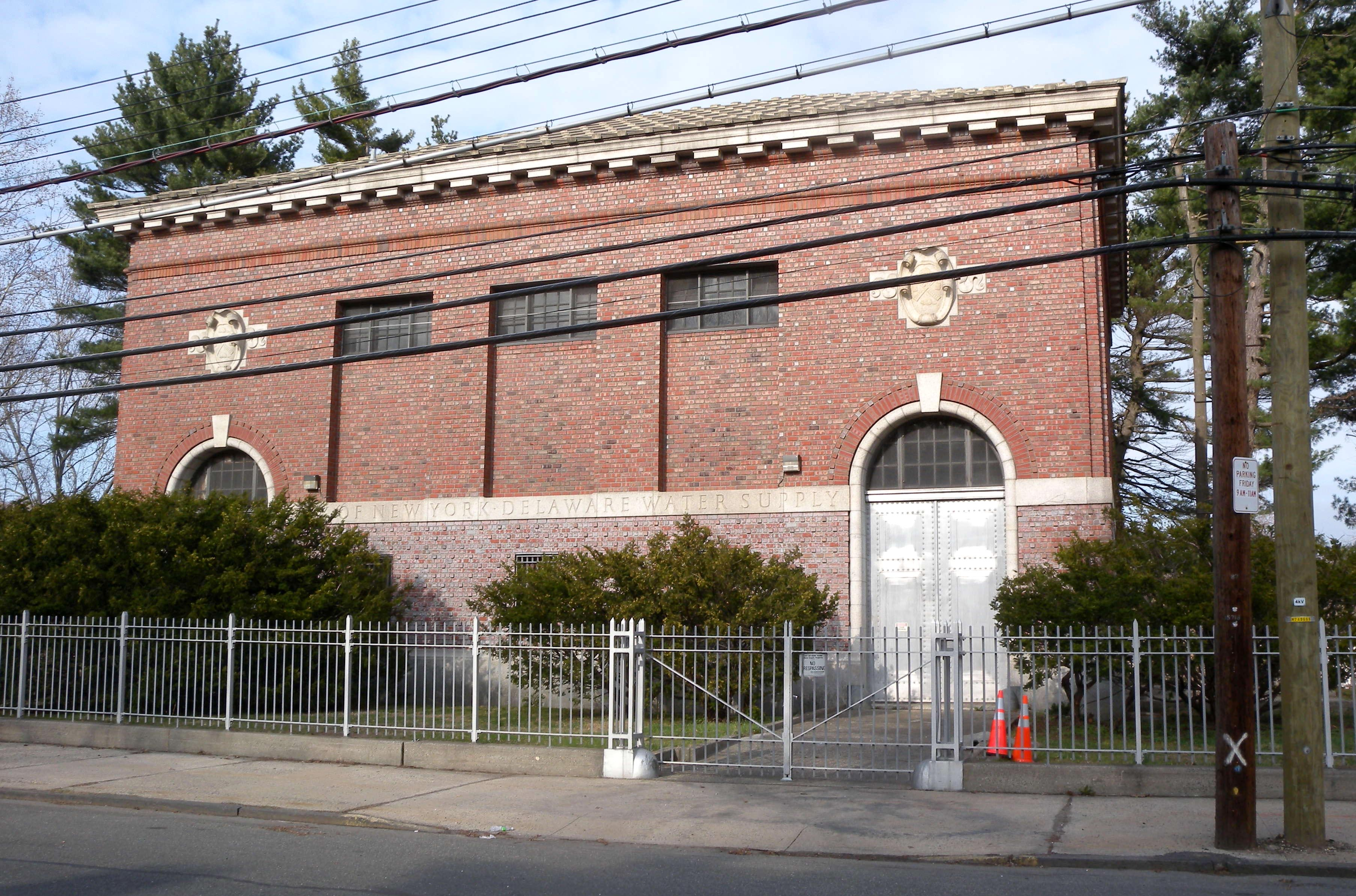
Water supply building in Yonkers

The Delaware Aqueduct carries water from the 95-square-mile (250 km^{2}), 49.6-billion-US-gallon (188-million-cubic-metre) watershed using the Rondout, Cannonsville, Neversink and Pepacton reservoirs with the Delaware and Neversink tunnels. (The latter three reservoirs are within the Delaware River watershed. The water from the Rondout Reservoir is collected as part of the Delaware system, though the Rondout Creek is part of the Hudson River watershed.)

Combined, the four reservoirs account for 1,012 square miles (2,620 km^{2}) of watershed and 320.4 billion US gallons (1.2 billion cubic metres) of capacity, 890 million US gallons (3.4 million cubic metres) of which goes to the city — half of daily demand. All this water is fed from the Rondout to West Branch Reservoir in Putnam County (part of the Croton River watershed, which includes the flow of the upstream Boyds Corner Reservoir), then to the Kensico, and Hillview reservoirs in southern Westchester County, before continuing on to distribution within New York City.

== Leak problems ==
Leaks were first discovered in the Delaware Aqueduct in 1988, with water losses up to 36 million US gallons (140,000 m^{3}) per day. The city took many years to analyze the leak problem and devise a solution. In 2010 it announced a plan for a major repair project.

=== Repairs ===
The NYCDEP is building a 2.5-mile (4.0 km) Rondout-West Branch Bypass Tunnel beneath the Hudson River, which will allow it to bypass the leak. Construction began in November 2013. "The number's going to be $1.5 billion to do the entire program to make the fix," said Paul Rush, Deputy Commissioner of the NYCDEP. "About two-thirds of it, $1 billion, will actually go into constructing a bypass tunnel around the location with the most significant leakage in Roseton, and to do additional concrete grouting in the Wawarsing section."

The new bypass tunnel is the largest construction project in NYCDEP's history. Construction of the tunnel, 500 feet (150 m) under the Hudson, was completed in 2019. The project involved digging two shafts measuring 700 and 900 feet (210 and 270 m) deep. To complete the repairs, the aqueduct was supposed to shut down temporarily in 2022, but this was postponed. The northern section of the tunnel was shut down in September 2024. The repair project was paused in November 2024 due to drought conditions. As of mid-2025, NYCDEP estimates that the final stage of the repair project will be complete in 2027.

== See also ==
- Catskill Aqueduct
- Croton Aqueduct
- Delaware River Basin Commission
