= Kensico Reservoir =

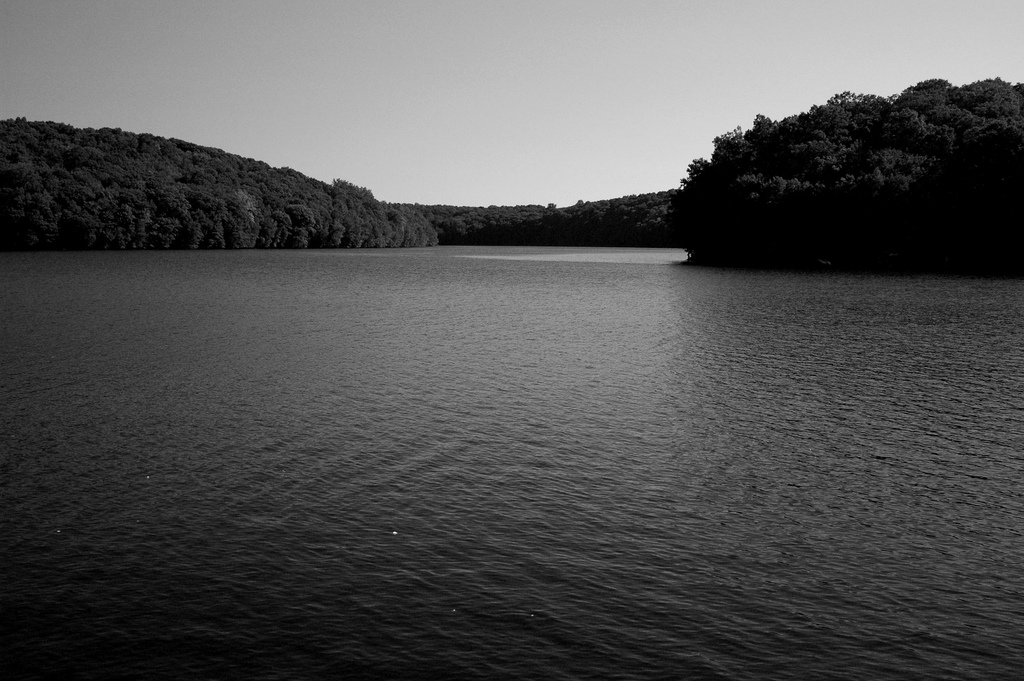
- Kensico Reservoir

- Location within New York
- Location: Valhalla, Harrison, North Castle, New York, United States
- Coordinates: 41°5′10″N 73°45′50″W Kensico Dam41°04′25″N 73°45′59″W
- Type: reservoir
- Primary inflows: Bronx River
- Primary outflows: Bronx River
- Basin countries: United States
- Surface area: 2,140 acres (8.7 km^{2})
- Average depth: 43.6 ft (13.3 m)
- Max. depth: 120 ft (37 m)
- Water volume: 30,000,000,000 US gal (110,000,000 m^{3})
- Surface elevation: 354 ft (108 m)

The Kensico Reservoir is a reservoir in the New York City water supply system. Spanning the towns of North Castle and Mount Pleasant, New York, it was formed by the Kensico Dam in 1885, which impounded waters from the Bronx and Byram Rivers.

In addition to being a catchment for its own drainage basin in Westchester County, the reservoir serves as a mixing basin for and stores waters from both the Catskill Aqueduct and Delaware Aqueduct, as well as the drainages of the West Branch Reservoir and Boyds Corner Reservoir (that lie within the Croton River watershed), which get mixed at West Branch with those of the Delaware Aqueduct before the combined flow is carried to Kensico.

The final reservoir within the Catskill/Delaware system, Kensico is held back by the 1,843 foot (562 m) long, 307-foot (94 m) high Kensico Dam, and holds approximately 30 billion US gallons (110,000,000 m^{3}) of water.

== History ==
The first use of water from Westchester County came from the Old Croton Dam, which was completed in 1842. During the 1880s, New York faced increased demands for water and sought to enlarge the Croton Distributing Reservoir located in Manhattan to meet that need. The enlargement was completed in 1906 as a part of a system of reservoirs – the Croton Watershed – designed to draw water from Putnam and Westchester counties to New York City.

In 1885, the old Kensico Dam was built south of the village of Kensico as an additional source of water for New York City. The dam formed a small lake with water from the Bronx and Byram Rivers, but it was not enough for New York's increasing population. A larger reservoir was needed to act as a holding tank for distribution to New York City. Kensico was surrounded by hills that came to a natural V-shape, making it an ideal area to hold a vast amount of water. To the south of Kensico were two ponds in Harrison, Rye Pond and Little Rye Pond, which would eventually form part of the new reservoir. A nearby quarry in Harrison bordering Cranberry Lake provided the necessary materials for building the new dam.

In 1905, New York State passed legislation to allow fundraising for the construction of Kensico Reservoir. The following year, final planning by the state was approved, and preliminary surveys were started. A seventeen-mile railroad spur and a small network of highways were built to carry materials from quarries at nearby Cranberry and Silver Lakes to the dam site. A camp for the workers and their families was also constructed, along with public facilities for their children.

To prepare for the dam construction, each individual lot of land was condemned and appraised, and the owner was paid a "fair value" for the land. Many of the families had to move to the surrounding communities of Armonk, Harrison, Valhalla, and White Plains. The village of Kensico was then flooded to make way for the reservoir.

On July 12, 2018, the New York City Department of Environmental Protection (DEP) announced plans for a Kensico-Eastview Connection Project. The project mainly involved constructing an approximately 2-mile long tunnel between the Kensico Reservoir and the nearby Catskill-Delaware Water Ultraviolet Disinfection Facility.

== Dam construction ==
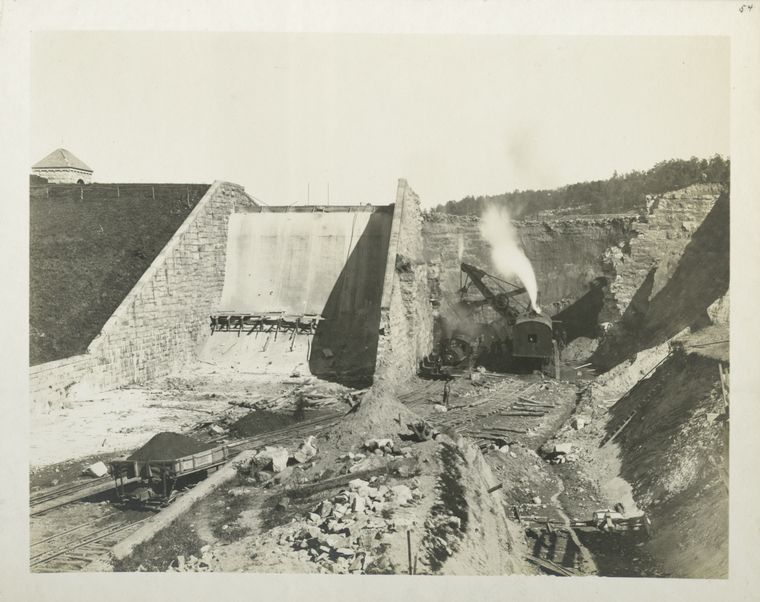
Old Kensico Dam being removed by steam shovel in 1911

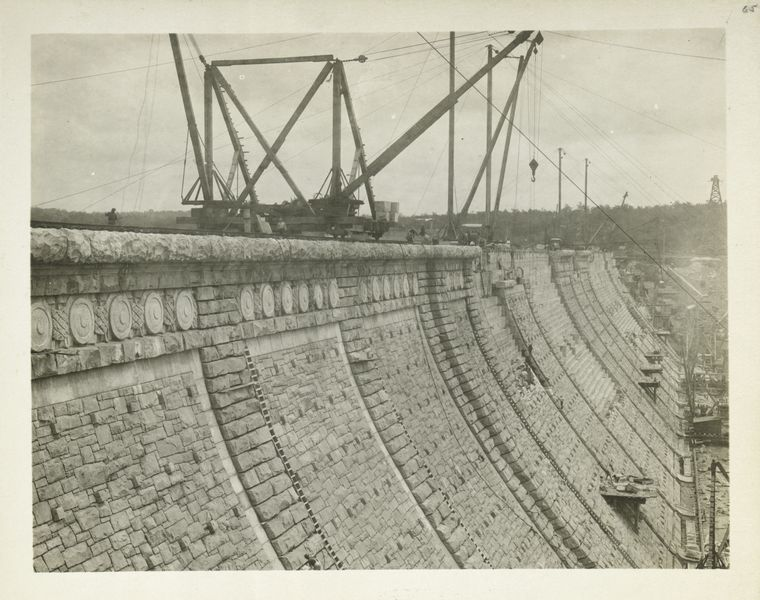
The new Kensico Dam under construction in 1915

Before constructing the new Kensico Dam, the old one had to be removed; demolition began in 1911. The construction of the new dam began in 1913 and was concluded in 1917—three years ahead of schedule—at a cost of more than $15,000,000.

The dam is 1,843 feet (562 m) long, stands 307 feet (94 m) above its foundation, and is able to hold back about 30 billion US gallons (110,000,000 m^{3}) of water. It contains 1 million cubic feet (28,000 m^{3}) of masonry.

Frank E. Winsor was the engineer in charge of construction at Kensico. New York City's main contractor built a work camp at nearby Valhalla for the 1,500 men who worked on the dam at the height of construction, and the water supply board created a mounted police force to keep order. Crews were largely made up of Italian immigrants, who were tasked with digging straight down to a depth of 110 feet (34 m) to reach solid rock with no water-bearing seams. This entailed months of blasting and a number of fatal accidents.

The tremendous influx of workers and their families provided a period of growth for the surrounding area, spurring new stores, rooming houses, hotels, restaurants and saloons. Many of the worker's families remained in the area after the completion of the dam, contributing to the growth and character of Valhalla and its environs. The Kensico Reservoir was acquired as parkland in 1963 from the New York City Watershed Commission and remains the property of the DEP.

== Water sources ==
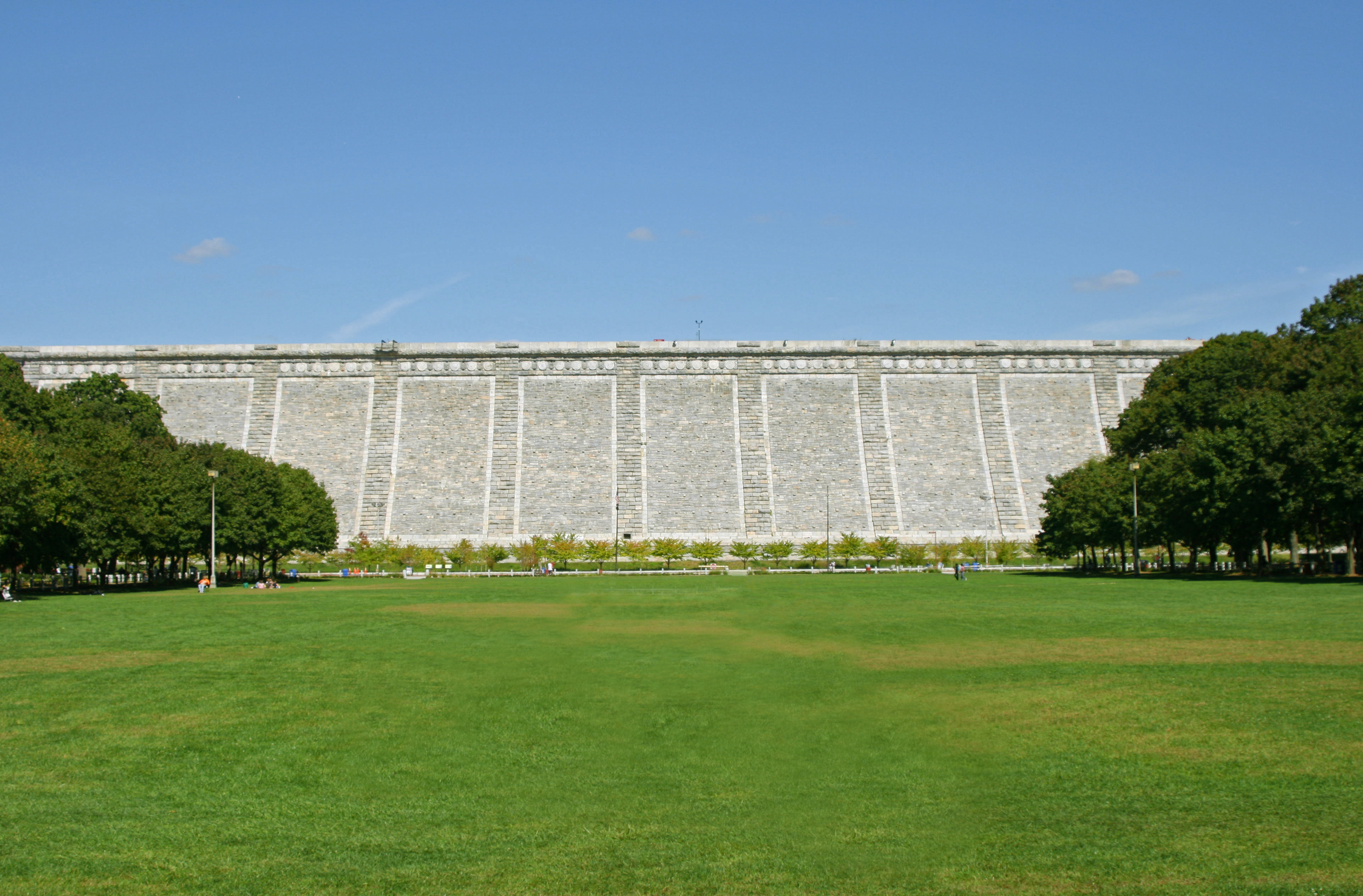
Kensico Dam and Plaza

The reservoir is the collecting point for the Schoharie Reservoir and Ashokan Reservoir of the Catskill Aqueduct; the Cannonsville Reservoir, the Neversink Reservoir, the Pepacton Reservoir, and the Rondout Reservoir of the Delaware Aqueduct; and Croton River watershed waters from the Boyds Corner Reservoir and the West Branch Reservoir.

Through the use of pumping stations along the Delaware Aqueduct, it is possible when needed to supply Kensico reservoir with water from the Cross River Reservoir and Croton Falls Reservoir (and indirectly, the reservoirs upstream of the Croton Falls) as well as the Hudson River; however these connections are rarely in use.

The resulting body of water has a drainage basin of 13 square miles (34 km^{2}) and holds 30.6 billion US gallons (116,000,000 m^{3}) of water at full capacity. The reservoir's watershed provides only 2% of New York City's water supply, while the rest comes from the reservoirs to which it connects. After leaving Kensico, the water is treated with ultraviolet light at the Catskill-Delaware Water Ultraviolet Disinfection Facility, then continues on to Hillview Reservoir in Yonkers. At Hillview the water enters the three city tunnels that distribute water throughout the boroughs of New York City.

In order to protect the water quality in the Kensico Reservoir, the city owns the shoreline land and several other properties in the area. In 2025 DEP announced the purchase of additional land, to protect the reservoir from stormwater runoff pollution.

== Fishing ==
Kensico Reservoir sustains an active population of gamefish including brown trout, lake trout, smallmouth bass, largemouth bass, perch, and grass pickerel. The size and depth of the reservoir allow lake trout in particular to thrive. Shore fishing is practiced in many areas, and boating is restricted to Department of Environmental Conservation licensed and inspected aluminum rowboats. No motorboats or recreational watercraft are permitted on the reservoir. In April 2020, the reservoir was stocked with 7,360 brown trout fingerlings. The reservoir was formerly stocked with lake trout, however this program was discontinued after it was determined they had established a sustainable breeding population.

== Kensico Dam Plaza ==
The Kensico Dam plaza is a plaza located at the foot of the dam. Historically, Westchester County's Department of Parks has hosted several community-wide events at the plaza, including outdoor screenings throughout the summer and early autumn, and a Fourth of July celebration with fireworks, food trucks, and live music. Amidst the COVID-19 pandemic, it also began sponsoring "Winter Wonderland," a winter holiday-themed drive-through light experience. The plaza also provides recreational activities, including a playground, a large lawn, gravel paths for walking and biking, and a hiking trail running from the plaza level to the top of the dam. Placards posted throughout the plaza encompass its history.

The plaza is also home to The Rising, a memorial dedicated to victims of the 9/11 terrorist attacks who were from Westchester County. This memorial displays the names of the victims on the granite surrounding the main structure. The main structure of the memorial is made of steel rods that come together and point towards the sky.

== See also ==
- Trial of Joseph Spell
