= Catskill Aqueduct =

Aqueduct in New York

Coordinates: 41°50′55″N 74°8′14″W

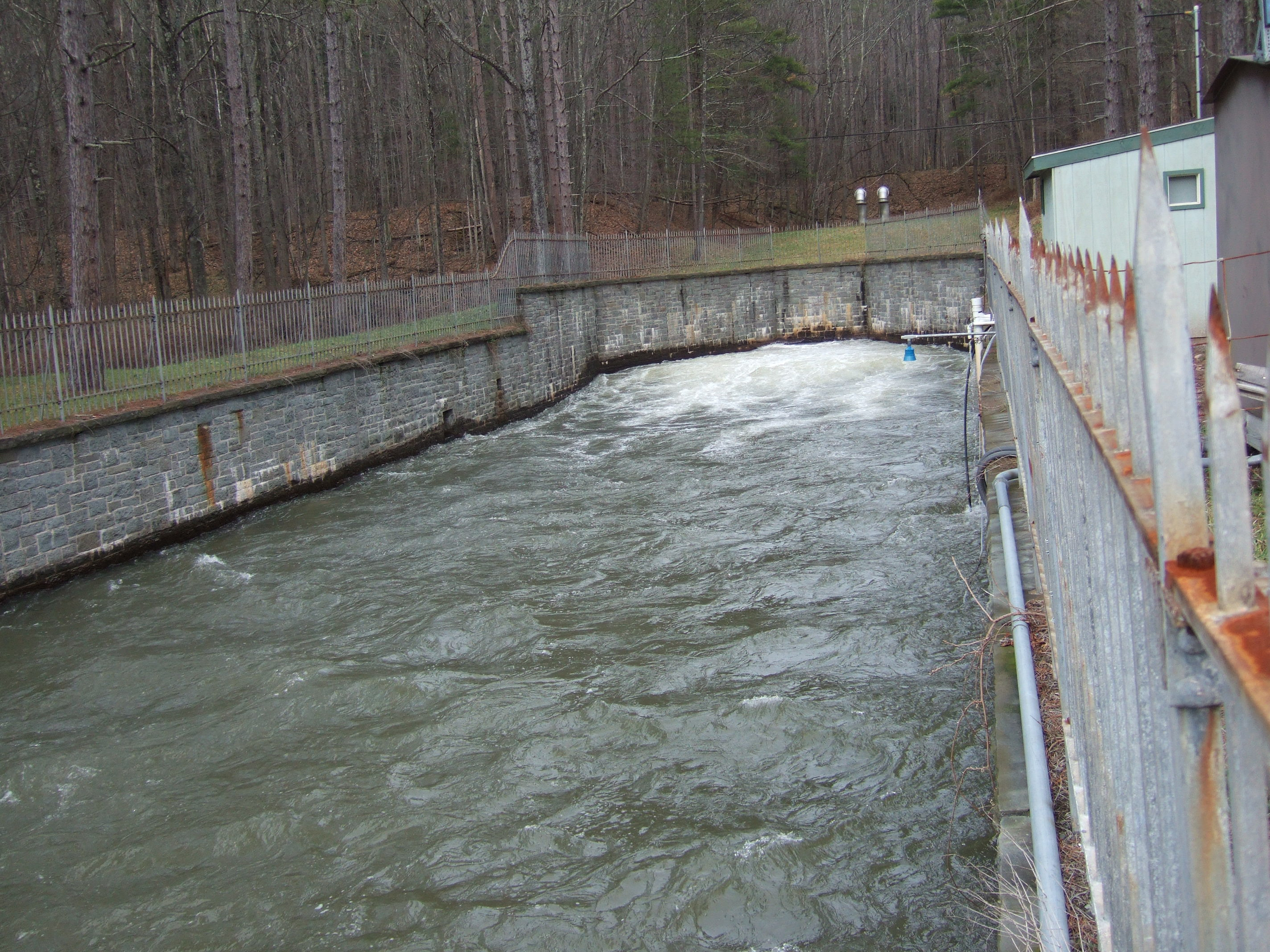
The Catskill Aqueduct in Shandaken, New York

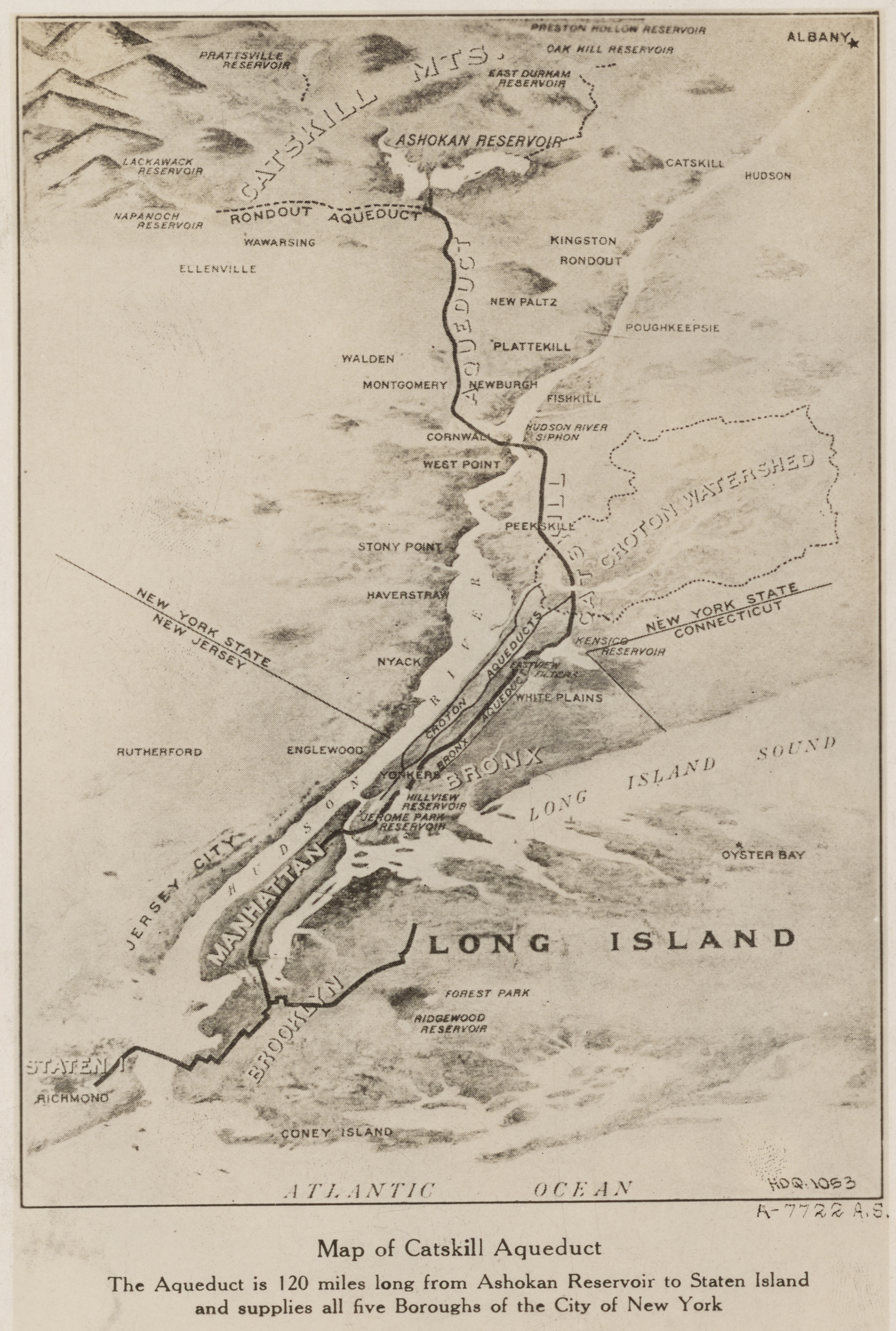
Map of Catskill Aqueduct

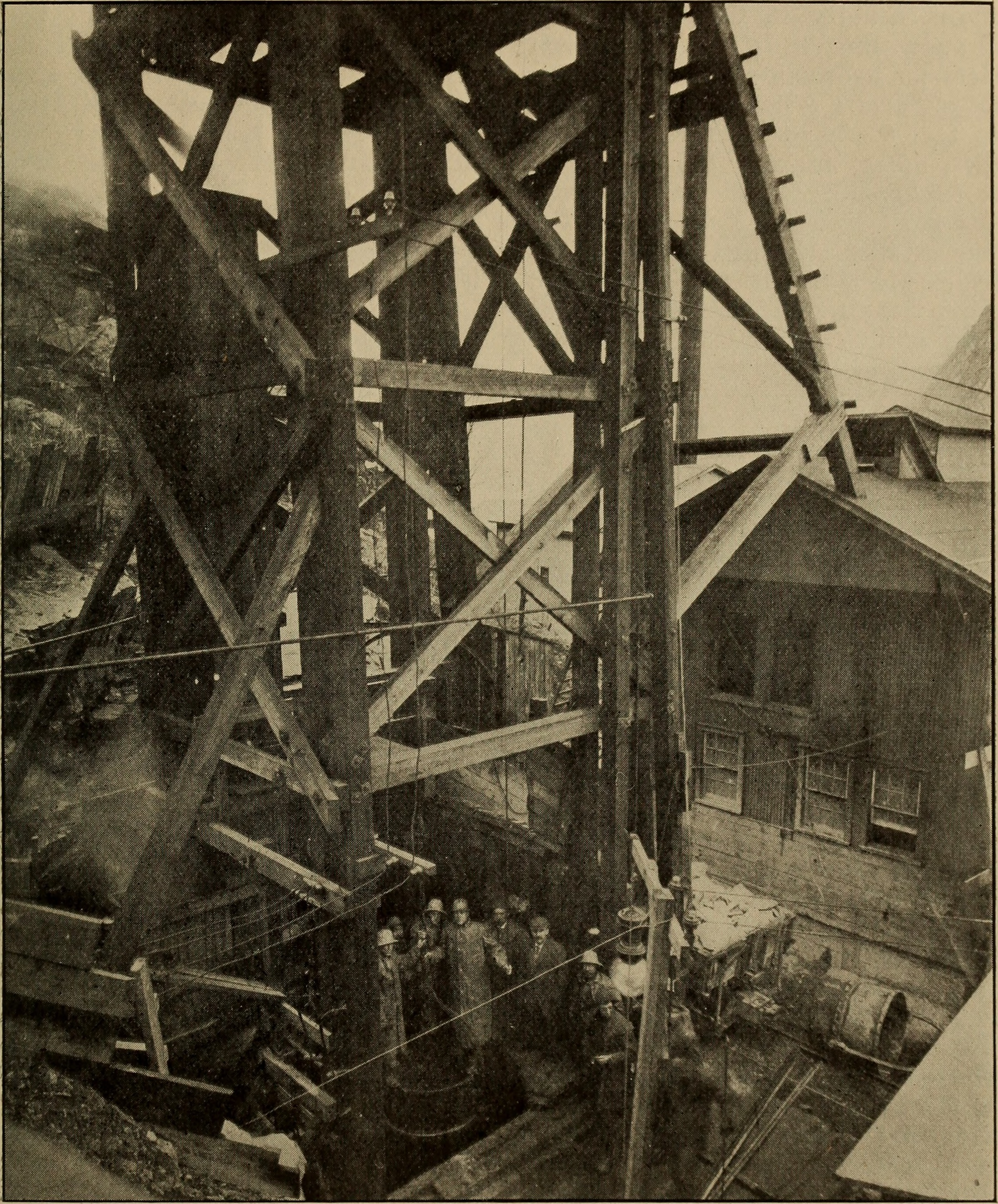
Test shaft for the Catskill Aqueduct (c. 1905-1910, published 1911)

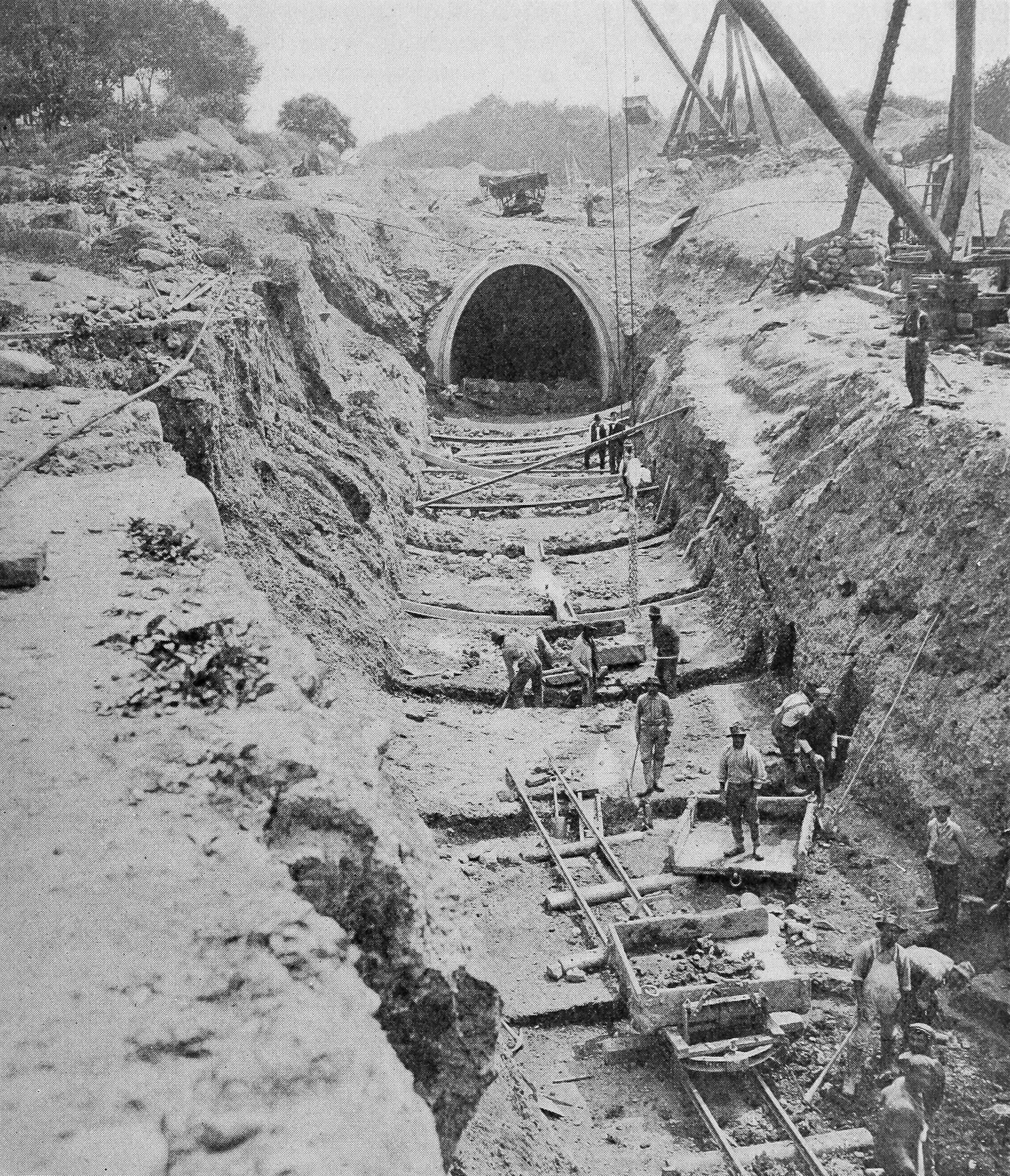
Cut and cover construction on the Catskill Aqueduct, 1911

The Catskill Aqueduct is an aqueduct in the New York City water supply system which brings water from the Catskill Mountains to Kensico Dam in Westchester County, New York. There it joins with waters from the Kensico watershed and the Delaware Aqueduct. After mixing and settling, the flow from Kensico continues in the aqueduct to the Hillview Reservoir in Yonkers for distribution in New York City.

The 92-mile (148 km) aqueduct is fed by the waters of the Schoharie and Ashokan reservoirs located in Ulster County.

== History ==
Construction began in 1907. Numerous test shafts were dug to determine the stability of the area's sub-surface geology to ensure both the impermeability of the completed reservoirs and holding strength of their various levees, tunnels, dikes, and dams, and the integrity of the structures of the aqueduct. The aqueduct proper was completed in 1916 and the entire Catskill Aqueduct system including three dams and 67 shafts was completed in 1924. The total cost of constructing the system, less interest on the bonds to finance it, was $177 million ($4.34 billion in 2024).

== Specifications ==
The 92-mile (148 km) aqueduct consists of 55 miles (89 km) of cut and cover aqueduct, over 14 miles (23 km) of grade tunnel, 17 miles (27 km) of pressure tunnel, and nine miles (14 km) of steel siphon. The 67 shafts sunk for various purposes on the aqueduct and City Tunnel vary in depth from 174 to 1,187 feet (53 to 362 m). Water flows by gravity through the aqueduct at a rate of about 4 feet per second (1.2 m/s).

The Catskill Aqueduct has an operational capacity of about 550 million US gallons (2,100,000 m^{3}) per day north of the Kensico Reservoir in Valhalla, New York. Capacity in the section of the aqueduct south of Kensico Reservoir to the Hillview Reservoir in Yonkers, New York is 880 million US gallons (3,300,000 m^{3}) per day. The aqueduct normally operates well below capacity with daily averages around 350–400 million US gallons (1,300,000–1,500,000 m^{3}) of water per day. About 40% of New York City's water supply flows through the Catskill Aqueduct.

== Geography ==
The Catskill Aqueduct begins at the Ashokan Reservoir in Olivebridge, New York, located in Ulster County, which is fed by its own watershed and flow from the upstream Schoharie Reservoir. The aqueduct traverses in a southeasterly direction, first tunneling beneath the Rondout Valley and Rondout Creek in the town of Marbletown, then beneath the Wallkill River in the town of Gardiner in Ulster County before flowing toward Orange County. At Storm King Mountain it crosses 1,100 feet (340 m) below the Hudson River to Breakneck Mountain in Putnam County on the east side of the river.

The aqueduct then enters Westchester County, and flows to the Kensico Reservoir, where it joins with waters of the Kensico drainage basin and the city's Delaware Aqueduct. It continues from Kensico and terminates at the Hillview Reservoir in Yonkers. The Hillview Reservoir then feeds City Tunnels 1 and 2, which bring water to New York City. If necessary, water can be made to bypass both reservoirs.

== See also ==
- Delaware Aqueduct
- New York City water supply system
- Frank E. Winsor the engineer in charge of construction of 32 miles (51 km) of the Aqueduct.
