= Beatrice Welters =

American diplomat and philanthropist

United States Ambassador to Trinidad and Tobago
- In office May 2010 – November 2012

Personal details
- Born: Beatrice Wilkinson; July 2, 1951 (age 75) Brooklyn, New York, U.S.
- Spouse: Anthony Welters
- Education: Ulster Community College, A.A. 1972 Manhattanville College, B.A. 1974 John Jay College of Criminal Justice, M.A. 1976
- Occupation: Systems engineer and philanthropist

Beatrice Wilkinson Welters (born July 2, 1951) is an African American diplomat, systems engineer, and philanthropist. She served as the United States Ambassador to Trinidad and Tobago from May 2010 through November 2012. She co-founded the AnBryce Foundation and the Vincent Wilkinson Foundation with her husband, Anthony Welters.

== Early life ==
Welters was born in Brooklyn, New York on July 2, 1951. Her origins are from the Caribean; her paternal grandmother immigrated to New York City from the Barbados and her maternal grandmother immigrated to New York City from Jamaica. Welters was seven when her mother died.. Her father died when she was twelve. After being orphaned, she was in foster care in Brooklyn, and lived with a foster family, Mr. and Mrs. Harvey V. Herron.

Welters attended Ulster Community College (now the SUNY Ulster) in Stone Ridge, New York, graduating with an Associate degree in 1972. She then received a Bachelor of Arts degree from Manhattanville College in Purchase, New York in 1974. Welter attended the John Jay College of Criminal Justice in New York City and received a Master of Arts in psychology and criminal justice in 1976.

== Career ==
In 1971, Welters started working for IBM, where she held positions through 1991 such as systems engineer and technical authority on IBM’s marketing team.

President Barack Obama appointed Welters as the United States Ambassador to Trinidad and Tobago in 2010. The United States Senate confirmed her on March 10, 2010. She began her term as the ambassador in May 2010 in Port of Spain. In this capacity, shw worked on the Caribbean Basin Security Initiative, the Energy and Climate Partnership of the Americas, and the U.S. Partnership Framework on HIV/AIDS. Welters resigned from the diplomatic post in November 2012 and returned to the United States.

== Philanthropy ==
With her husband, Welters established the AnBryce Foundation in 1995 to provide opportunities for disadvantaged children. She is the president and chairman of the foundation. Through the AnBryce Foundation, Welters created the Camp Dogwood Summer Academy, a tuition-free educational summer camp program in Virginia. Through the foundation, she also co-founded the AnBryce Scholars Program at the New York University School of Law and the University of Notre Dame, which helps students who are academically gifted but economically disadvantaged attend graduate school.

Welters and her husband formed the Vincent Wilkinson Foundation in 2004; it provides organizational grants to support education for underserved youth. In 2016, Welters created the Beatrice W. Welters Breast Health Outreach & Navigation Program at the NYU Langone Health.

Welters serves on the board of the Brookings Institution and the national council of the White House Historical Association. She is also an emeritus trustee of the John F. Kennedy Center for the Performing Arts and served on the boards of the Aspen Institute, the Colin Powell School for Civic and Global Leadership, the Library of Congress, the National Symphony Orchestra, and the Washington Jesuit Academy.

== Honors ==
In October 2008, Welters and her husband received the Woodrow Wilson Award for Public Service. Livingstone College gave her an honorary doctorate in 2009. She received the Promise of America Award in 2015.

== Personal life ==
Welters is married to Anthony Welters, an attorney and executive with UnitedHealthcare. Their two sons are Andrew Welters and Bryant Welters. As of January 2026, they live in McLean, Virginia.

Welters was a founding member of the National Museum of African American History and Culture. She is a member of Zeta Phi Beta sorority in Alexandria, Virginia. She has hiked Mount Kilimanjaro two times.

In February 2007, Welters was diagnosed with triple-negative breast cancer. She had a mastectomy at the at the Perlmutter Cancer Center at NYU Langone and did not required additional treatments.
