= SUNY Ulster =

Community college in Stone Ridge, New York, U.S.

Ulster County Community College (SUNY Ulster)
- Type: Public community college
- Established: 1961; 65 years ago
- Parent institution: State University of New York
- President: Alison Buckley
- Undergraduates: 3,150 (fall 2025)
- Location: Stone Ridge, New York, United States; 41.852925°N 74.13115°W
- Campus: Rural 165 acres (0.67 km^{2})
- Colors: Blue & White
- Sporting affiliations: National Junior College Athletic Association, Region III, Mid-Hudson Conference
- Mascot: Senator Sam
- Website: www.sunyulster.edu

SUNY Ulster (Ulster County Community College) is a public community college with its main campus in Stone Ridge, New York, in Ulster County. It is part of the State University of New York (SUNY) system. The college also maintains facilities in Kingston at the Kingston Center of SUNY Ulster (KCSU).

== Academics ==
SUNY Ulster offers over 60 undergraduate academic programs, including veterinary technology, graphic arts and fine arts, education, criminal justice, and nursing.

== Campus ==
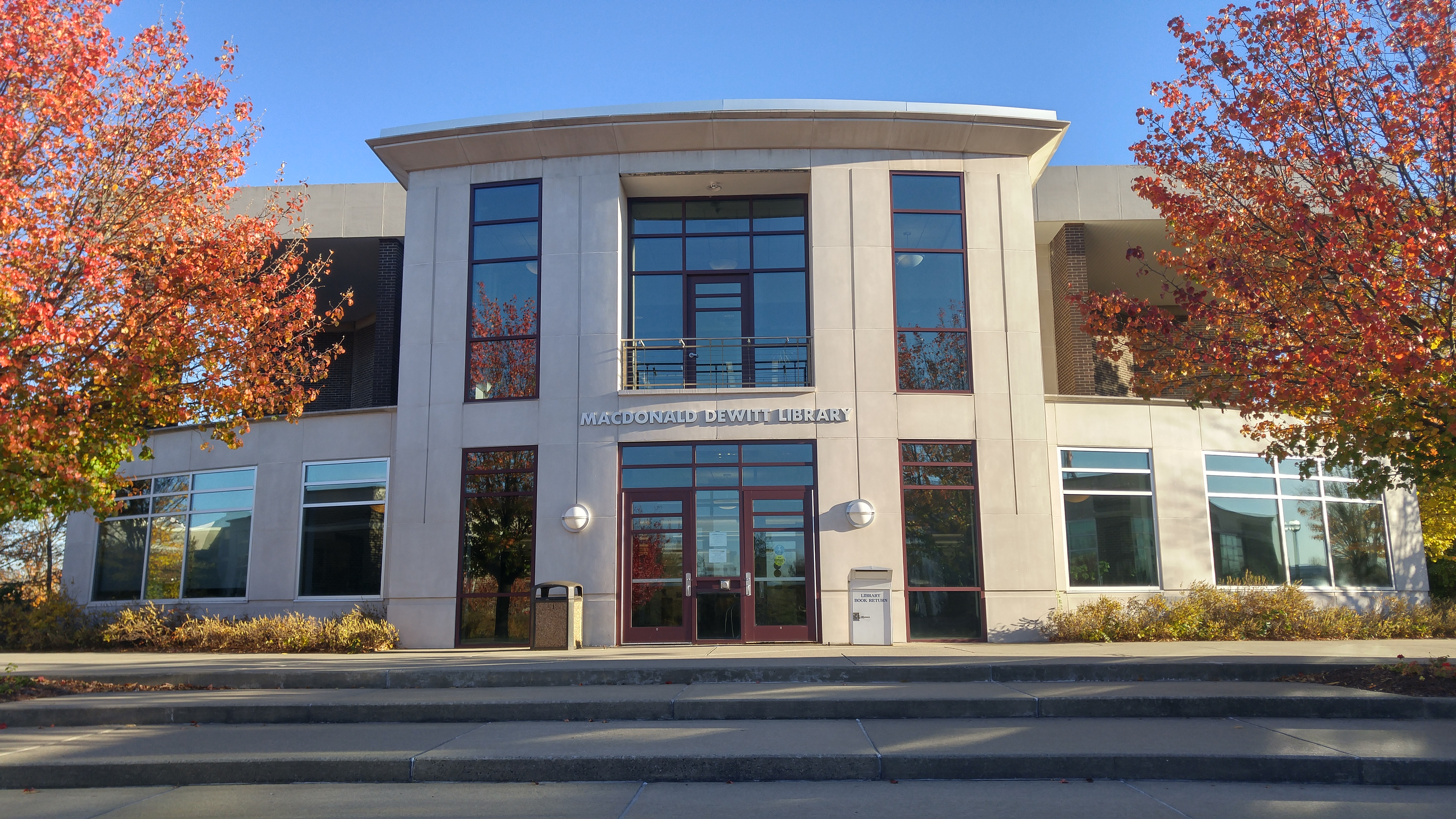
The Macdonald DeWitt Library at SUNY Ulster's Stone Ridge campus

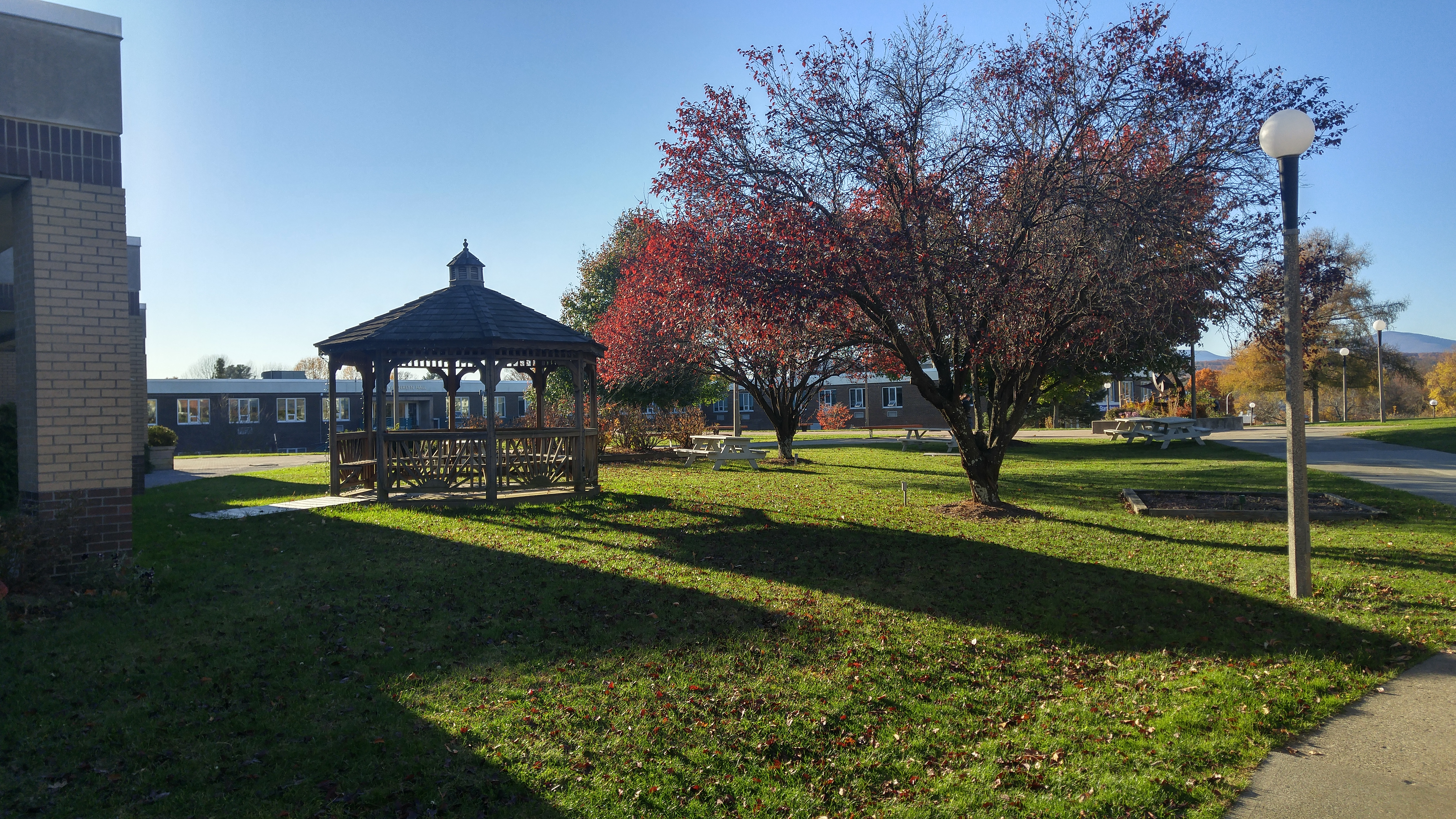
The Vanderlyn Quad at SUNY Ulster's Stone Ridge campus

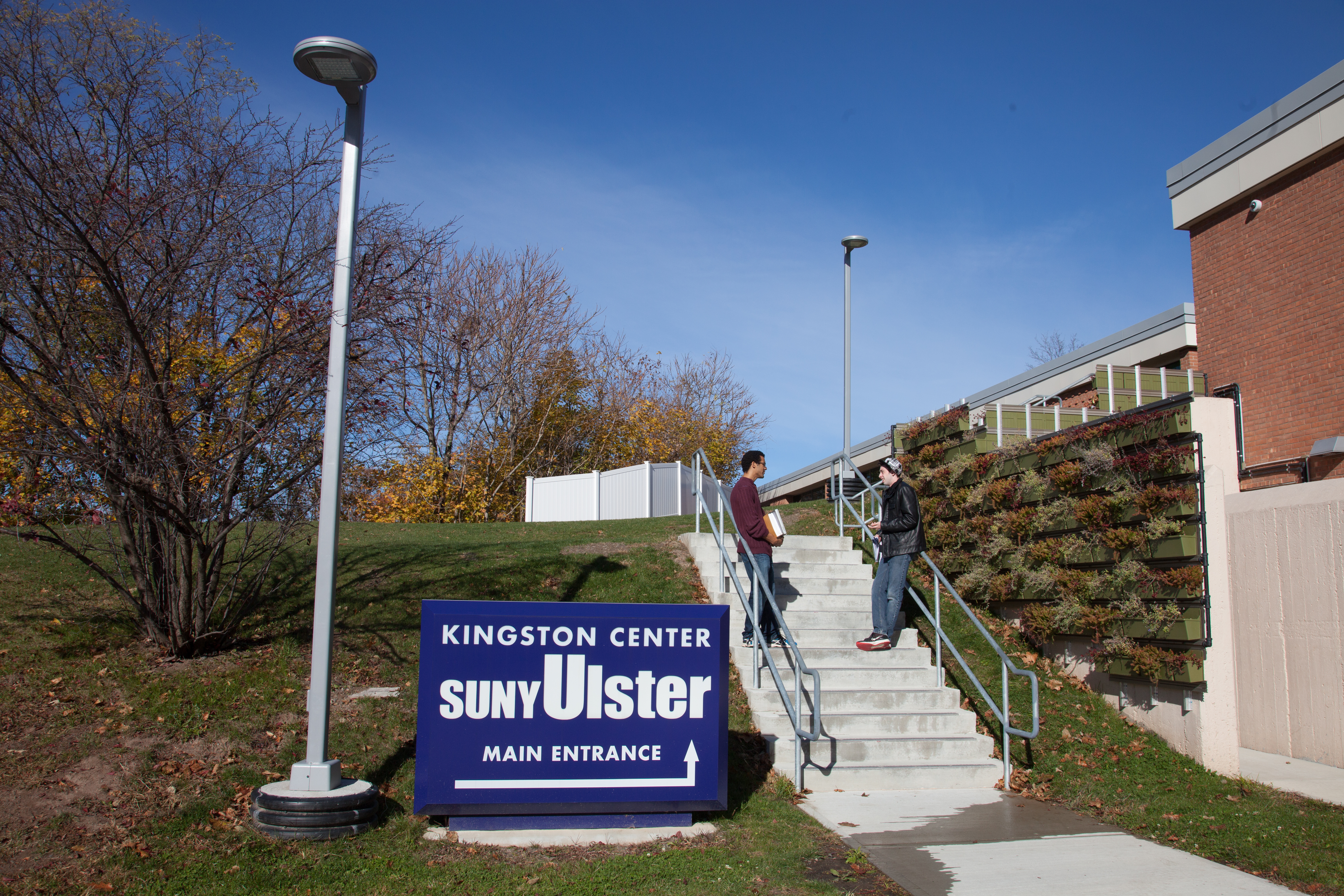
The Kingston Center of SUNY Ulster

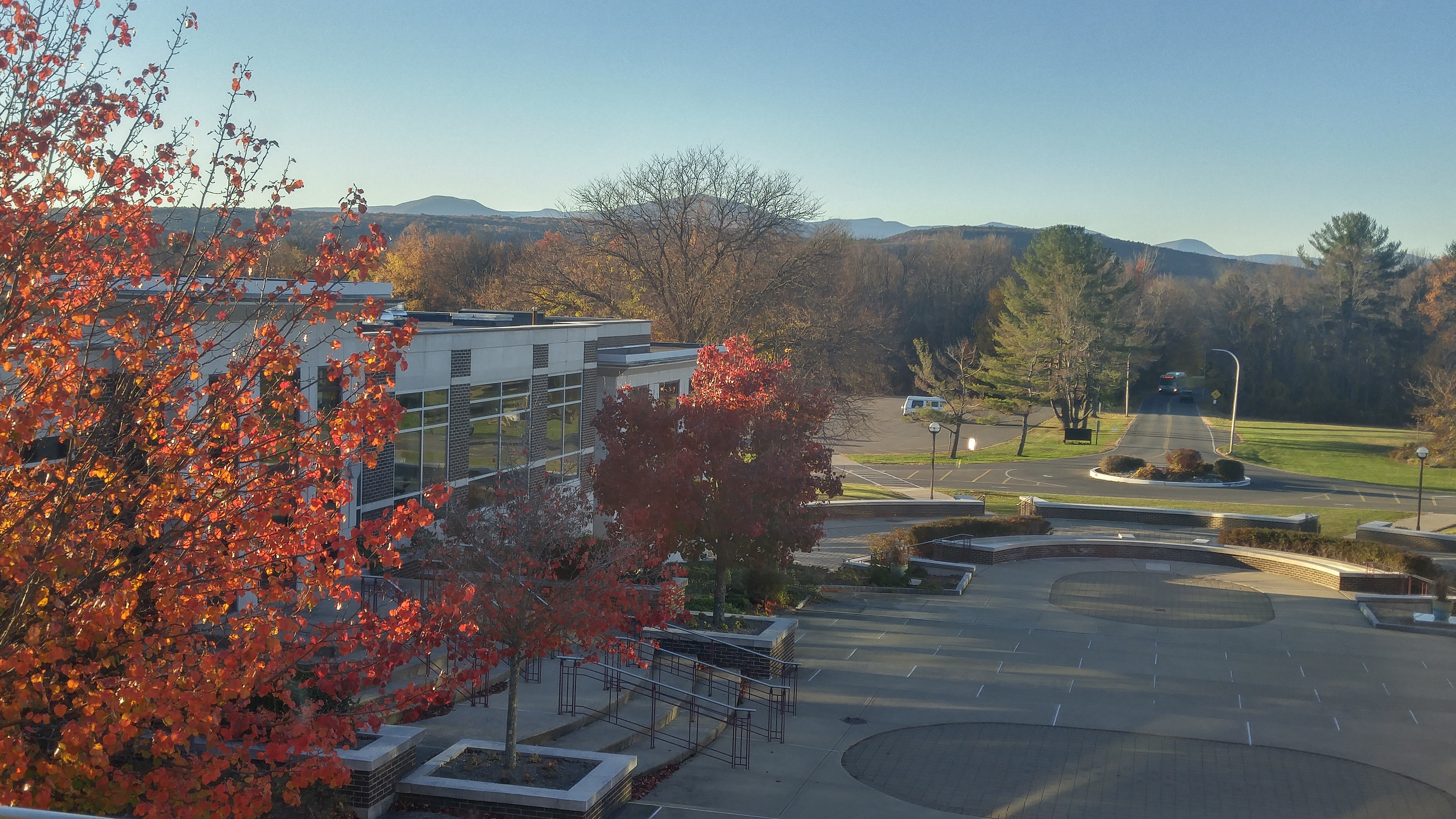
Overlooking the Catskill Mountains from the Macdonald DeWitt Library

== Notable alumni ==
- Brennan Lee Mulligan, writer and comedian
- Beatrice Welters (A.A., 1972), United States Ambassador to Trinidad and Tobago
