= Main Street Historic District (Stone Ridge, New York) =

Historic district in New York, United States

- U.S. National Register of Historic Places
- U.S. Historic district
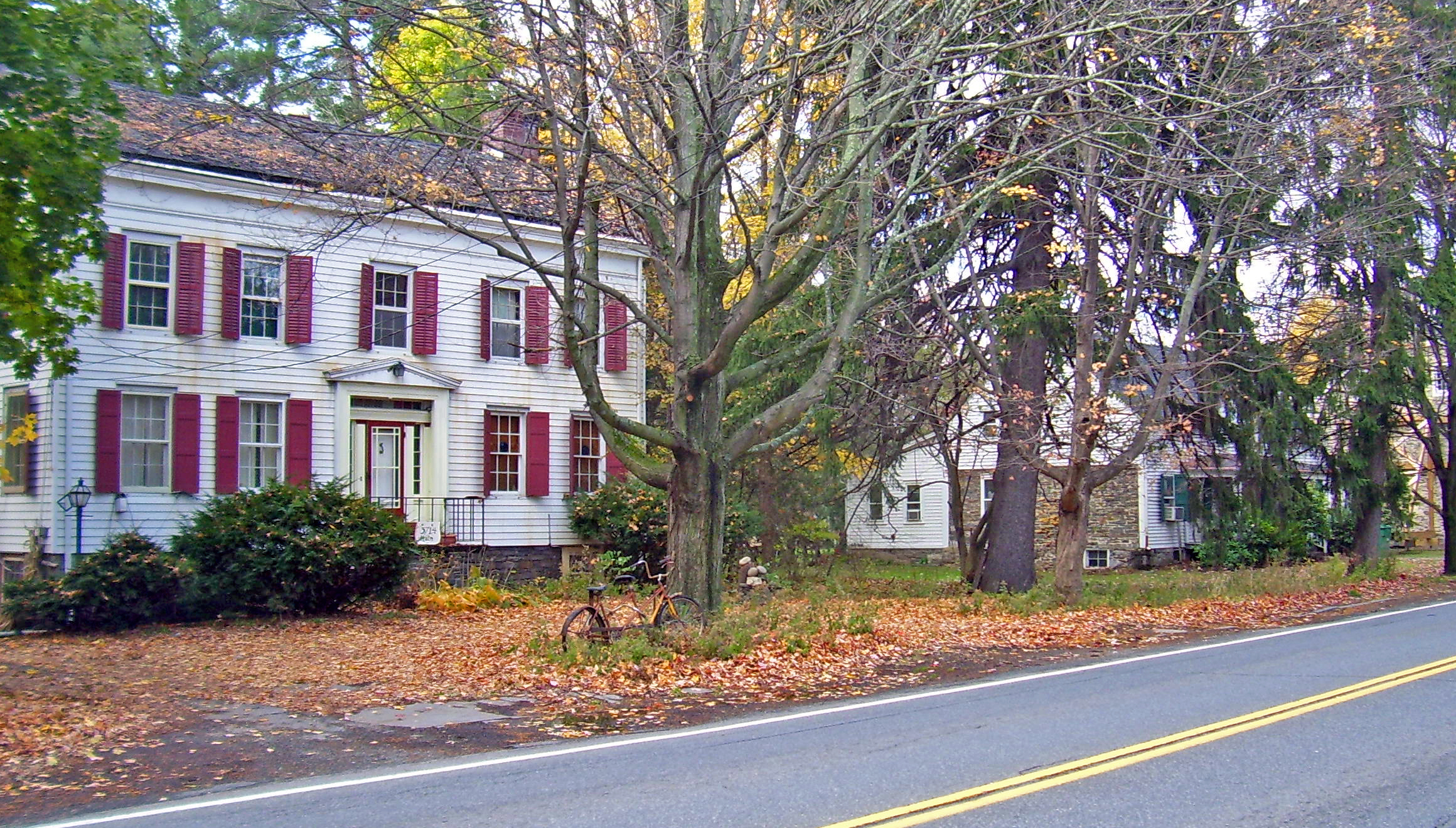
- Houses amidst wooded lots along Main Street, 2007

- Location within New York Location within the United States
- Location: Stone Ridge, NY
- Nearest city: Kingston
- Coordinates: 41°50′52″N 74°08′40″W
- Area: 70 acres (28 ha)
- Built: 1750-1930
- Architectural style: Colonial, Federal style, Greek Revival, Craftsman
- NRHP reference No.: 88000666
- Added to NRHP: June 7, 1988

The Main Street Historic District in Stone Ridge, New York, United States, is located along US 209/NY 213 in that hamlet, part of the Town of Marbletown in Ulster County. It is a strip from the southern end of the unincorporated community to a short distance north of the intersection at Cooper Street, where the 209/213 concurrency ends. The latter highway turns left (northwest) towards the Catskill Mountains.

Main Street's 70 acres (28 ha) contain 97 resources on 38 separate lots. All but five are contributing properties to the historic character of the district. In 1988, Main Street Historic District was added to the National Register of Historic Places.

The buildings are mostly houses, dating from the 18th and early 19th centuries. The earlier structures are stone houses such as the Hasbrouck House at the district's southern boundary and the 1767 Cornelius Wynkoop Stone House, where George Washington once slept. Later buildings show the Federal and Greek Revival styles, such as the Tack Tavern, the Marbletown Dutch Reformed Church, and the town library (which was once the house of Edward Lounsbery). A few Craftsman and Victorian houses are scattered among the older homes. The entire strip has been relatively unchanged since the early 20th century, with the only significant addition being Marbletown's town hall and accompanying garages.

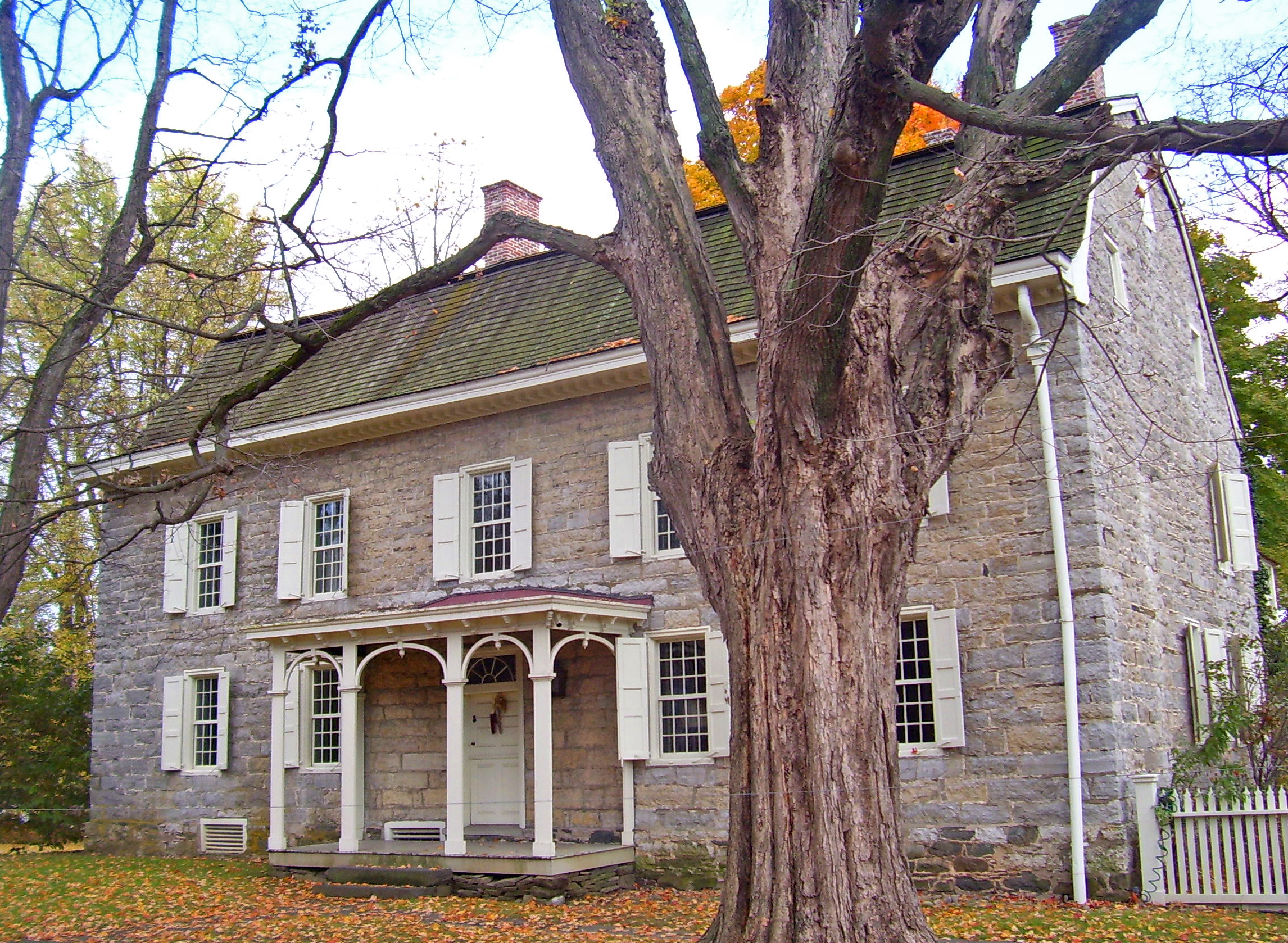
Historic tree in front of Wynkoop House.

From the earliest settlement of the area, development remained close to what was then the Old Mine Road. There were no side streets because the land on both sides of the road slopes down to unbuildable wetlands. Due to the short setback of the houses and other buildings, the lots—which range in size from one-quarter acre to more than twenty acres—appear smaller than they are.

Many houses also have historic outbuildings in their rear. They are shielded from view of traffic along the street somewhat by the wooded character of the lots, which also makes the transition from country to town somewhat less abrupt for drivers approaching Stone Ridge along 209/213 from the south. Six black locust trees spaced 10 feet (3 m) apart along the frontage of the Wynkoop House, which was added to the National Register in its own right in 1996, were planted around the time it was built and are contributing aspects of its historic character.
