= Rest Plaus Historic District =

Historic district in New York, United States

- U.S. National Register of Historic Places
- U.S. Historic district
- Location within New York Location within the United States
- Location: Roughly, along Old Kings Hwy., Rest Plaus Rd. and Lucas Tpk. (Co. Rt. 1), Marbletown, New York
- Coordinates: 41°49′12″N 74°9′52″W
- Area: 725 acres (293 ha)
- Architectural style: Colonial, Federal, Greek Revival
- NRHP reference No.: 95000602
- Added to NRHP: June 1, 1995

Rest Plaus Historic District is a national historic district located at Marbletown in Ulster County, New York. The district includes 55 contributing buildings, four contributing sites, 10 contributing structures, and one contributing object. It encompasses mostly undeveloped open space that has been in continuous agricultural use for over 250 years. Most of the land is in four principal farms.

It was listed on the National Register of Historic Places in 1995.
