= Stephen Minarik =

American politician (1960–2009)

Chairman of the Monroe County, New York Republican Committee
- In office March 24, 1992 – June 27, 2008
- Preceded by: John A. Stanwix
- Succeeded by: William D. Reilich

Chairman of the New York Republican State Committee
- In office November 15, 2004 – November 2006
- Preceded by: Alexander Treadwell
- Succeeded by: Joseph Mondello

Personal details
- Born: Stephen J. Minarik III; January 2, 1960 Rochester, New York, U.S.
- Died: April 12, 2009 (aged 49) Webster, New York, U.S.
- Cause of death: Heart attack
- Party: Republican
- Education: University of Rochester

Stephen J. Minarik III (January 2, 1960, in Rochester, New York – April 12, 2009 in Webster, New York) was a New York State political figure who served as the chairman of the Monroe County, New York, and New York State Republican Committees.

== Life ==
Minarik was the son of Stephen J., Jr. and Eleanor Minarik. He graduated from Irondequoit High School in 1978 and received a bachelor's degree in political science from the University of Rochester in 1982. He credited working in his grandfather's restaurant, Steve's Treetop Inn, as key to his future political career.

He began his career in politics in 1979 with Young Americans For Freedom the nation's largest young conservative organization. He became active in government in 1983, when he was hired to be the assistant deputy county clerk in the office of the Monroe County Legislature's Republican majority. He worked on Republican campaigns, most notably those of Congressman Fred J. Eckert and County Executive Lucien Morin. In 1988, he moved to a position in the county's community development administration and formed a campaign committee in 1989 to elect Republicans to the County Legislature. In 1990, the GOP hired him to be the executive director of its county committee which led to his election to chairman in 1992, a post he held for sixteen years.

During this time, he led the Republican Party to a takeover of the County Legislature and elected three consecutive Republican county executives: Robert L. King, Jack Doyle, and Maggie Brooks. Said Ben Smith of the New York Observer, "his record in Rochester is, in political terms, difficult to argue with: With only a slight Republican registration advantage, and working both as a paid political consultant and as county chairman, he took nearly all of the county’s important offices away from the ruling Democrats and built a formidable organization".

His successes as county chairman led Governor George E. Pataki to select him to be the Republican state chairman in November 2004. Minarik quickly came under attack following his remarks on the election of Howard Dean as chairman of the Democratic National Committee, stating that the Democrats were now the party of Barbara Boxer, Lynne Stewart, and Howard Dean. These comments set off a national firestorm, with Pataki publicly rebuking Minarik, and Dean demanding an apology or Minarik's resignation. Minarik refused, calling this "just the latest Dean scream, and stating that the Democrats would be wise to take action on members like Lynne Stewart, rather than attacking me. Maybe then the Democratic Party can start to regain some credibility with the American people.

Minarik also earned the ire of State Senator Serphin R. Maltese for leading a successful push to revamp the state committee's bylaws, and to include the Log Cabin Republicans on the State GOP's executive committee. Stated Minarik, in the Republican Party we are allowed to have diversity of opinion. While I may agree with Serph Maltese on many of the issues, particularly with regard to the Log Cabin Republican group, that doesn't mean they shouldn't be allowed to sit at our table and be part of our party. Inclusion won, and inclusion won handily. I'm happy about that.

Minarik was a vocal booster of former Massachusetts Governor William F. Weld's candidacy for governor, and unsuccessfully pushed for the party to run moderate Republican candidates for governor and United States Senate. In June 2006, the State Republican Committee proceeded to nominate a conservative slate of candidates not favored by Minarik, including Gubernatorial nominee John Faso. Minarik prevailed on Weld to drop out of the Gubernatorial election to unify the party behind Faso.

Faso faced questions during the campaign regarding his conservatism, his anti-abortion position and his lobbying activities. The Faso-led ticket lost all statewide offices to the Democrats for the first time in 60 years, and lost three Congressional seats. This included losses to Governor Eliot L. Spitzer and State Comptroller Alan Hevesi; both of whom would later resign their offices in disgrace. Minarik stepped down as chairman shortly after the 2006 elections.

In 2008, he stepped down as chairman of the Monroe County Republican Committee at the request of Maggie Brooks.

Minarik was a stroke survivor who reported developing a preference for country music after the incident.

He lived resided in Webster, New York, and was a partner in a political consulting firm, Impact Communications, LLC.

== Death ==
Minarik died on April 12, 2009, of a heart attack, aged 49.

In an editorial mourning his death, the Rochester Democrat and Chronicle stated that,

Wherever you stood on his political style and methods – and this page was a frequent critic over the years – former Monroe County Republican chairman Steve Minarik, who died Sunday, was an accomplished political leader in this community...People stayed on message, and Republican control of the county executive's office, the county Legislature and most town and village governments testified to his success over his 16-year tenure as county chair and two years as state chair.

Party political offices
| Preceded by John A. Stanwix | Chairman of the Monroe County, New York Republican Committee; March 24, 1992 – June 27, 2008 | Succeeded by William D. Reilich |
| Preceded by Alexander F. Treadwell | Chairman of the New York Republican State Committee; November 15, 2004 – November 2006 | Succeeded by Joseph N. Mondello |
