= Michael Benjamin (investor) =

American investor and politician

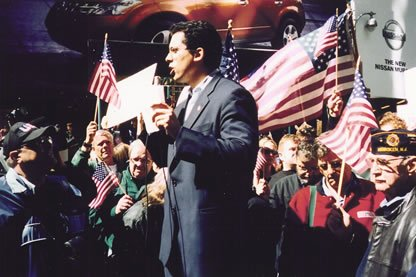
- Bonheur in 2004

Personal details
- Born: November 1, 1969 (age 56) New York City, US
- Spouse: Meaghan Benjamin (m. 2008; div. 2022)
- Occupation: Investor, politician

Michael Benjamin Bonheur (born November 1, 1969) is an American investor and politician, who was an unsuccessful Republican candidate for the United States Senate in 2004.

== Early life and education ==
Bonheur was born on November 1, 1969, in New York City, to an Iranian Jewish father that immigrated to the United States from Tehran in 1950 and a Catholic mother who immigrated from Honduras.

Soon after Bonheur's birth, the family moved to San Pedro Sula, Honduras, where his father was relocated with his job at Bank of America. After about one year in San Pedro Sula, they moved to the capital, Tegucigalpa, for another year. In 1971, the family moved to Lima, Peru and in 1973, they moved to Quito. Bonheur attended school at the American Cotopaxi Academy.

Several years later, in 1976, the family moved back to the U.S. They settled in the New York City suburb of Greenwich, Connecticut, where they lived for four years. Bonheur attended North Street Elementary School. In 1980, the family relocated to Bogotá, Colombia. He attended the American school Colegio Nueva Granada. Soon after, in 1982, they moved to Mexico City, where he attended the American School Foundation. They left Mexico in 1987 and, after a brief stay in San Francisco, moved back to Greenwich. Bonheur attended his senior year at Greenwich High School. While there, he was awarded High Honors by the NAACP for his writing in recognition of Black History Month.

Bonheur attended New York University, where he studied economics and Western literature and was elected president of the student government for his junior and senior years. He received his Bachelor of Arts in 1992 and shortly thereafter began work as an assistant to the president of Richter & Co., Inc., an investment bank in midtown Manhattan known primarily for launching Cerberus Partners, L.P. a major American hedge fund. He later worked in the insurance industry with American Corporate Benefits, Inc. and Guardian Life Insurance Company, before starting his own securities trading and investments business in 1997.

== The New York Benevolence Council, Inc. ==
Along with another graduate of NYU, Bonheur founded the New York Benevolence Council, Inc. in 1993, a non-profit organization which provided mentoring and tutoring in New York City public schools, coordinated food and clothing drives, and organized fund-raisers in support of various humanitarian causes. At its height in the late 1990s and early 2000s, NYBC had over 1,000 young professionals serving as volunteer tutors and mentors to public school students, and organizing fund-raising benefits primarily for women and children who were victims of domestic violence. In 2002, New York City Mayor Michael Bloomberg awarded NYBC a community service award for its work on behalf of victims of domestic violence. In 2003, after a 10-year run, NYBC donated its assets to various charitable organizations and ceased operations.

== Political career ==
=== 1996 Congressional Race ===
In 1996, Bonheur was the Republican nominee for the U.S. Congress from New York's 8th district, covering parts of Manhattan and Brooklyn. Although he lost the race, he received endorsements from Mayor Rudolph Giuliani and the New York Post. The chairman of his campaign was covil servant John C. Whitehead. Whitehead went on to head the Lower Manhattan Development Corporation, the organization in charge of rebuilding the World Trade Center after September 11 attacks.

=== 2004 Senate Race ===
In January 2003, Bonheur announced his intentions to run for the United States Senate against incumbent Democrat Chuck Schumer. Initially regarded as a long shot, he raised over $820,000 for the campaign from over 20,000 different individuals.

The conservative Bonheur battled with the state GOP, which decided in August 2004 there would be no primary. Despite his fundraising, the Republican State Committee nominated moderate Assemblyman Howard Mills III to run against Schumer. Mills went on to lose the election in the largest landslide for a Senate seat in the history of New York.

Bonheur publicly accused New York GOP Chairman Sandy Treadwell and Governor George Pataki of trying to muscle him out of the Senate race and undermine the democratic process. Many Republican voters were upset when Bonheur was denied the chance to engage in a primary. He had campaigned throughout New York, visiting all 62 counties on several occasions, and had built strong support among political leaders and community groups. He received the majority of his financial support in small donations, with only $2,500 from Political Action Committees (PACs). Mills had raised $200,000 less than him, and a large portion of his campaign contributions came from PACs.

His platform included simplifying the tax code, lowering taxes, reducing government spending, Social Security private accounts, a strong national defense, and a no-nonsense approach toward Iran, Syria and North Korea. His platform advocated for school choice for "all parents, not just the rich". Benjamin supported banning partial-birth abortion, except for cases where the mother's life is at risk, and abolishing unfunded Medicaid mandates on municipalities. He also stated he wanted to bring jobs back to New York and limit government intervention in the economy. He espoused many very conservative opinions including support for the war in Iraq and supported both the Patriot Act and the inclusion of Iran as part of the "Axis of Evil" by George W. Bush.

== Electoral history ==
US House election, 1996: New York District 8
Party	Candidate	Votes	%	±%
Democratic	Jerrold Nadler	131,943	82.3	
Republican	Michael Benjamin	26,028	16.2	
Conservative	George A. Galip, Jr.	2,381	1.5	
Majority		105,915	66.1	
Turnout		160,352	100	

== Notes ==
Preceded by David L. Askren	Republican Candidate; New York's 8th Congressional District; 1996	Succeeded by Theodore Howard
