= Roy L. Austin =

American diplomat (born 1939)

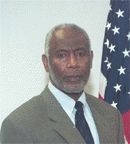

15th U.S. Ambassador to Trinidad and Tobago
- In office December 6, 2001 – December 18, 2009
- President: George W. Bush; Barack Obama
- Preceded by: Edward E. Shumaker III
- Succeeded by: Beatrice Wilkinson Welters

Personal details
- Born: Roy Leslie Austin; December 13, 1939 (age 86) Kingstown, Saint Vincent and the Grenadines
- Spouse: Glynis Josephine Sutherland
- Children: Roy L. Austin, Jr. Roger Austin; Deborah Austin Depay
- Education: Yale University (B.A.); University of Washington (M.A., Ph.D.)
- Occupation: Professor of Sociology

Roy Leslie Austin (born 1939) is a former United States Ambassador to Trinidad and Tobago from December 2001 to December 2009.

== Biography ==
Born in Kingstown, Saint Vincent and the Grenadines, he moved to the United States to study and later became a U.S. citizen. He attended Yale University and graduated with a Bachelor of Arts in sociology. While there he befriended future U.S. President George W. Bush and both were inducted to the secret society Skull and Bones. He earned a Master of Arts and Ph.D. in sociology from the University of Washington.

Austin was Associate Professor of Sociology, Justice, and African American Studies at Pennsylvania State University and served as director of the Crime, Law, and Justice Program and the Africana Research Center.

Bush appointed Austin to the post of Ambassador to Trinidad and Tobago. He was sworn in October 19, 2001. He left the post on December 18, 2009.

== Personal life ==
In 1967, Austin married Glynis Josephine Sutherland. They have three children, Roy L. Austin, Jr., Roger Austin, and Deborah Austin Depay. Austin's eldest son, Roy Jr., served as a Deputy Assistant to President Barack Obama leading the White House Office of Urban Affairs, Justice, and Opportunity.

Diplomatic posts
Preceded by Edward E. Shumaker III	United States Ambassador to Trinidad and Tobago; 2001–2009	Succeeded by Beatrice Wilkinson Welters
