= Cornelius Wynkoop Stone House =

- U.S. National Register of Historic Places
- U.S. Historic district – Contributing property
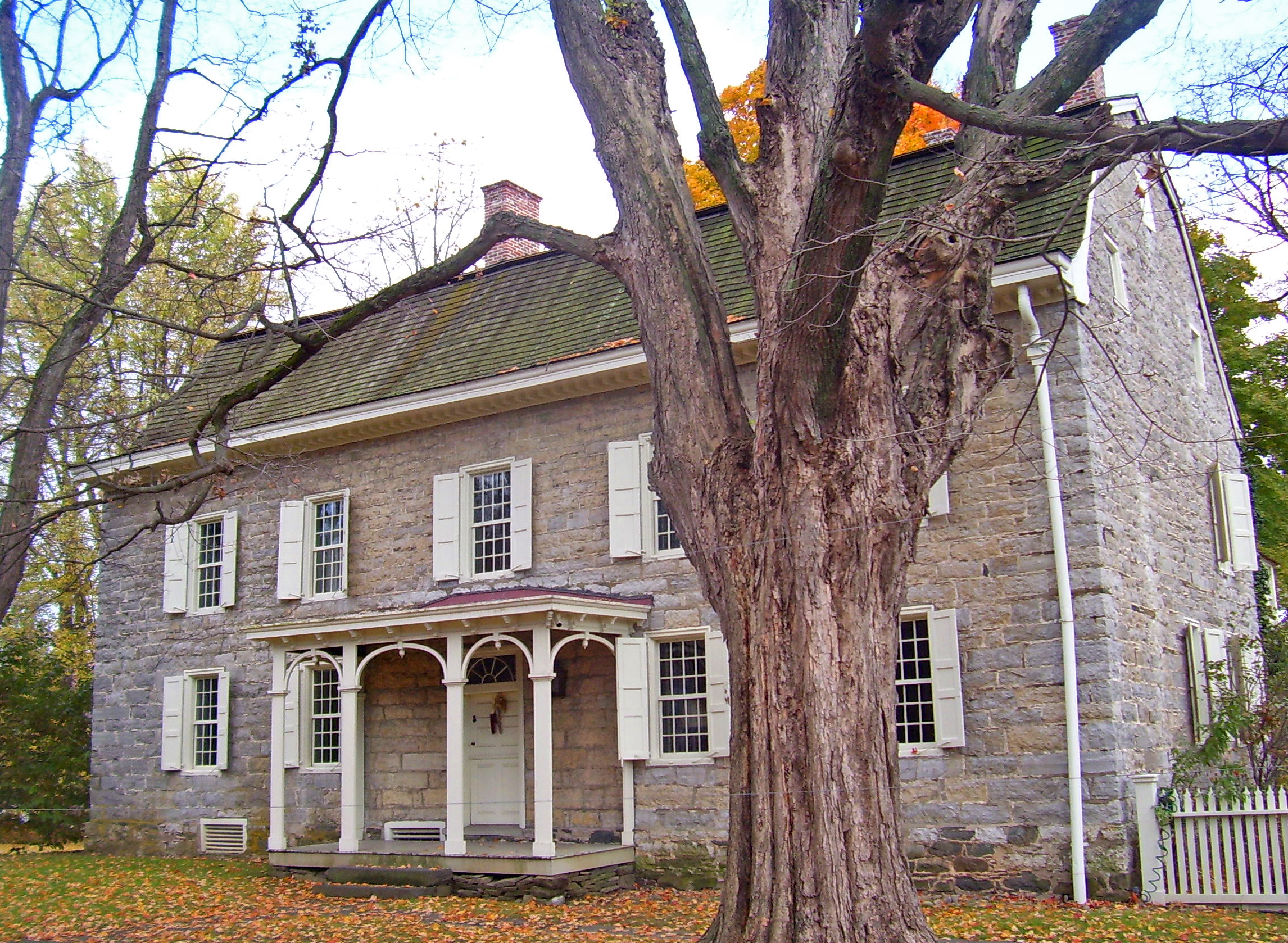
- House in 2007, with sugar maple tree in foreground

- Location within New York Location within the United States
- Interactive map showing the location of Cornelius Wynkoop House
- Location: 3721 Main Street Stone Ridge, New York 12484
- Nearest city: Kingston
- Coordinates: 41°50′48″N 74°08′43″W
- Built: 1772
- Architectural style: Georgian
- Part of: Main Street Historic District (ID88000666)
- NRHP reference No.: 96000138

Significant dates
- Added to NRHP: February 23, 1996
- Designated CP: June 7, 1988

The Cornelius Wynkoop Stone House is located along US 209 in the hamlet of Stone Ridge, New York, United States. It is a stone house in the Georgian style, built from 1767 to 1772 for Cornelius Evert Wynkoop. It is a contributing property to the Main Street Historic District, and was added to the National Register of Historic Places in its own right in 1996.

The house combines a Georgian plan with a gambrel roof, an unusual combination reflecting British and Dutch tastes found on only one other stone house in the Hudson Valley. George Washington spent a night at the house as well.

== Building ==
The two-story building sits on a 60-by-33-foot (18 by 10 m) base. All facades are made of locally quarried gray limestone. The since-modified original first floor plan of a center hall dividing a large room on one side from two smaller ones on the other is still evident in the basement layout, with the original winter kitchen in the southwest corner. The second story is given over to bedrooms and storage space. The fine wide stair, with gumwood balusters and rails gives ascent to the attic, used also for storage.

A 24-by-35-foot (7.3 by 10.7 m) stone ell at the rear considerably predates the rest of the house, possibly having been built as early as 1715 as a tenant farmer's home. It has evidence of a jambless fireplace, probably removed when the old house was converted into the Wynkoops' summer kitchen. Porches and the picket fence out front were added in later years.

The interior has changed very little. Care has been taken in contemporary restorations to avoid using newer materials—for example, damaged wood has been reconsolidated with invisible modern epoxies rather than replaced with modern wood. Or, materials and methods true to the period were used. Modern conveniences such as heating, plumbing and electricity were not installed until 1992.

A nearby carriage house, the other building on the plot, is a contributing property to the site as it was built around the same time. Six large black locust trees, spaced 10 feet (3 m) apart on the front of the property, date to c. 1770 as well and are also considered integral to its setting.

== History ==
Cornelius Evert Wynkoop was the great-grandson of the original Dutch settler in his family, Cornelis Wynkoop, who established a homestead in nearby Hurley (formerly known as Nieu Dorp), New York, in the 1680s. After marrying Cornelia Mancis in 1766, Wynkoop, the youngest son of a prosperous brewer, purchased 42 acres (17 ha) and probably began construction of his house in the spring of 1767. A commemorative fireback on the first floor with the inscription "Nov 5 CWK 1772", CWK standing for Cornelius Wynkoop, suggested to one historian that the house was probably finished in 1772, but that may be unlikely as similar houses built at the same time had been finished in as little as six months, and Wynkoop was not short of cash. The Georgian design was a common one in pattern books but the gambrel roof was distinctly American and very popular at the time. Contemporary tax records suggest that it was one of the largest, if not the largest, house in the Town of Marbletown at the time.

Wynkoop served as an officer in the local Minutemen, as well as on the Committee to Detect and Defeat Conspiracies, along with Aaron Burr and Dewitt Clinton. Due to these connections, George Washington slept at his house on the night of November 15, 1782, when he was on his way to Kingston to give a speech and attend services at the Old Dutch Church.

After Wynkoop's 1795 death, his wife, daughter and son-in-law ran the farm until 1818, when they sold it to the Lounsbery family, headed by the local blacksmith, who had previously lived in what is now Stone Ridge's library across the street. Lounsbery's descendants held on to it through several subdivisions of the land until 1988. The front porch was built c. 1870. In 1929, they modified the kitchen roof, adding windows and the rear porch. After four years of vacancy, the present owner acquired it in 1992. It is currently used as an event hall, especially for weddings.

Photographs of the house and its interiors have appeared in Architectural Digest, Martha Stewart Living and Town and Country, among other publications. It has also been used as a backdrop for photos in the Lands' End and Ralph Lauren catalogs.
