= Joseph Mondello =

American politician (1938–2022)

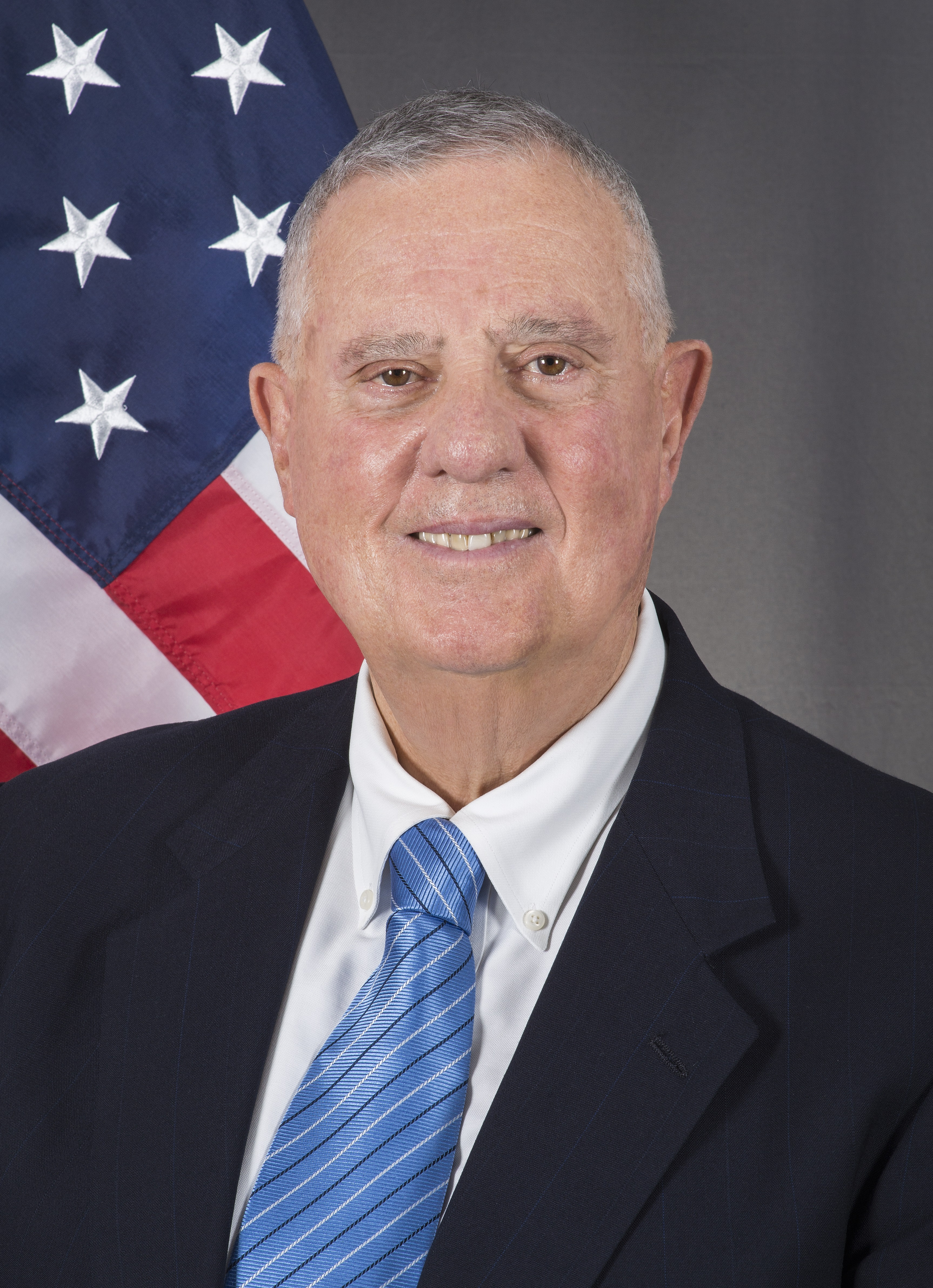

United States Ambassador to Trinidad and Tobago
- In office October 22, 2018 – January 13, 2021
- Appointed by: Donald Trump
- Preceded by: John L. Estrada
- Succeeded by: Candace Bond

Chair of the New York Republican Party
- In office November 15, 2006 – September 29, 2009
- Preceded by: Stephen Minarik
- Succeeded by: Edward F. Cox

Town Supervisor of Hempstead
- In office 1987–1993
- Preceded by: Thomas Gulotta
- Succeeded by: Gregory P. Peterson

Personal details
- Born: February 13, 1938 Brooklyn, New York, U.S.
- Died: August 1, 2022 (aged 84)
- Party: Republican
- Spouse: Linda Elizabeth Crabtree
- Children: 3
- Occupation: Politician, lawyer, professor

Military service
- Allegiance: United States
- Branch/service: United States Army; United States Air Force; United States Navy
- Years of service: 1955–1958

Joseph Nestor Mondello (February 13, 1938 – August 1, 2022) was an American politician and diplomat who served as the United States Ambassador to Trinidad and Tobago from 2018 to 2021. He previously served as Chairman of the New York Republican State Committee until September 2009 and as the chairman of the Nassau County Republican Committee from 1983 to May 24, 2018.

Mondello was a lawyer with the firm of Berkman, Henoch, Peterson and Peddy of Garden City, New York, and held the rank of Major General in the New York Guard. Prior to being elected state chairman, he served as the head of the Nassau County Republican Committee for twenty three years. He was a past Town supervisor of Hempstead, New York, as well as an attorney, college professor, high school teacher, and probation officer. He served as deputy commander of the New York Guard, and also served in the United States Army, Navy, and Air Force.

== Early career and background ==
Mondello was born in Brooklyn, New York, on February 13, 1938, to a Puerto Rican mother and a father of Sicilian descent, Joseph Mondello. Upon graduating high school, Mondello entered the Air National Guard as an airman from 1955 to 1956, and transferred to the United States Army as Corporal in the infantry from 1956 to 1958. After being honorably discharged, Mondello attended Hofstra University, and earned his Bachelor of Arts in 1962. After graduating, Mondello worked as a teacher in the East Meadow school system and later became a probation officer in Nassau County. Chairman Mondello would later return to his alma mater to teach as an adjunct professor of government.

His activities as a probation officer spurred him to return to the study of law, and in 1966, Mondello entered the New England School of Law. Mondello distinguished himself during his tenure in law school; he was named to law review after his first semester, an honor rarely accorded a freshman law student. He graduated in 1969, and after passing the bar examination joined the Levittown based law firm of Flaum, Imbarrato and Mondello.

Mondello then served in a host of legal positions, including counsel to the New York State Legislature, and an Assistant District Attorney in the Complaint, Felony, and Trial Bureaus. He would later serve as a Special Agent in the U.S. Office of Naval Intelligence. In 1975 he ran and was elected to the proposed Nassau County Legislature but because the electorate failed to approve a referendum setting up a legislative form of government in the County, never served in that capacity.

== Political career ==
From 1979 to 1987, Mondello served as a Councilman of the Town of Hempstead, New York. In January 1987, Mondello was appointed Town supervisor of Hempstead, which is the largest town in the United States with a population close to 800,000. He was then reelected by wide margins in 1987, 1989, and 1991. In 1984, Mondello became Chairman of the Nassau County Republican Committee, a position he held before stepping down in May 2018.

In March 2018, he was nominated by Donald Trump to be United States Ambassador to Trinidad and Tobago. He was confirmed for the post by the U.S. Senate on June 28, 2018, and appointed on July 2. Mondello presented his credentials to President Paula-Mae Weekes on October 22, 2018. He resigned on January 13, 2021.

== Death ==
Mondello died on August 1, 2022, at the age of 84.

Party political offices
Preceded by Stephen J. Minarik	Chairman of the New York Republican State Committee; 2006–2009	Succeeded by Edward F. Cox
Diplomatic posts
Preceded by John L. Estrada	United States Ambassador to Trinidad and Tobago; 2020–2021	Succeeded by Candace Bond
