= Richard Kenneth Fox =

American diplomat (1925–2017)

Richard K. Fox

US Ambassador to Trinidad and Tobago
- In office July 8, 1977 – July 16, 1979
- President: Jimmy Carter
- Preceded by: Albert B. Fay
- Succeeded by: Irving G. Cheslaw

Personal details
- Born: October 22, 1925 Cincinnati, OH
- Died: April 9, 2017 (aged 91) Washington, DC
- Resting place: Arlington National Cemetery
- Education: Indiana University

Richard Kenneth Fox, Jr. (October 22, 1925 – April 9, 2017) was an American career Foreign Service Officer who served United States Ambassador to Trinidad and Tobago (1977–79). He was also a lifelong advocate for equal employment.

== Early life ==
Richard Kenneth Fox, Jr. was born in Cincinnati, Ohio in October 1925. From 1944 to 1945, Fox served in the U.S. Navy. He graduated from Indiana University in 1950 with a bachelor's degree in journalism and then two years later with a graduate degree in social psychology.

== Career ==
From 1950 to 1956, he worked for the Urban League, a historic civil rights organization, in St. Louis and St. Paul. His work expanded employment opportunities for African Americans in those areas. In 1965, he became the Associate Director of the Minnesota Fair Employment Practices Commission.

In 1961 he joined the U.S. Department of State with the encouragement of Carl T. Rowan. In 1963, Fox was appointed Special Assistant for Employment Practices. In this position, he headed the State Department's new equal employment initiative. At the time, Black employment in the State Department was very low and Black employees were only assigned to certain positions in what was called the "Negro circuit." Fox was awarded the Superior Honor Award in 1964. In 1970, Fox became the Executive Director, and four years later the Deputy Assistant Secretary, of the Bureau of Educational and Cultural Affairs.

President Jimmy Carter appointed Fox to be the U.S. Ambassador to Trinidad and Tobago in 1977. Right before his appointment, Fox attended the Senior Seminar in Foreign Policy. At the beginning of Carter's term, his administration proposed a "Caribbean Initiative" to improve U.S.–Caribbean relations. The main concerns of Fox during his time as ambassador were economic due to the ongoing oil crisis.

At the end of his assignment in Trinidad and Tobago, Fox became Deputy Inspector General in the Inspection Corps. He retired in 1984 and was awarded the Wilbur J. Carr prize for distinguished service. He was a member of the American Academy of Diplomacy. He was also the vice president of the Meridian International Center and served on the board at Diplomatic and Consular Officers, Retired (DACOR) twice. He died in April 2017 at the age of 91.
