= Charles D. Cook =

American politician (1935–2001)

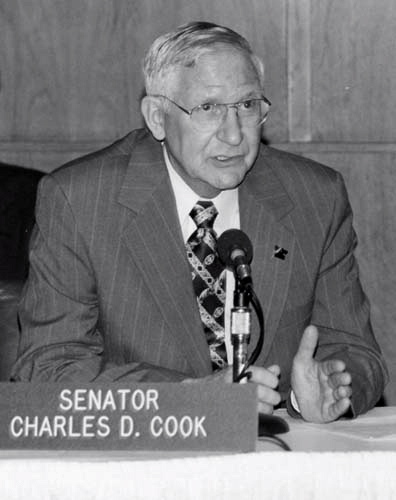

Member of the New York State Senate
- In office January 1, 1979 – December 31, 1998
- Preceded by: Edwyn E. Mason
- Succeeded by: John Bonacic
- Constituency: 48th district (1979-1982); 40th district (1983-1998)

Member of the New York State Assembly for the 105th District
- In office January 1, 1973 – December 31, 1978
- Preceded by: Clark C. Wemple
- Succeeded by: Arlington P. Van Dyke

Personal details
- Born: February 26, 1935 Deposit, New York, U.S.
- Died: May 23, 2001 (aged 66)
- Party: Republican

Charles David Cook (February 26, 1935 – May 23, 2001) was an American politician who served in the New York State Legislature for 26 years and was appointed to the National Advisory Committee on Rural Health by President George H.W. Bush.

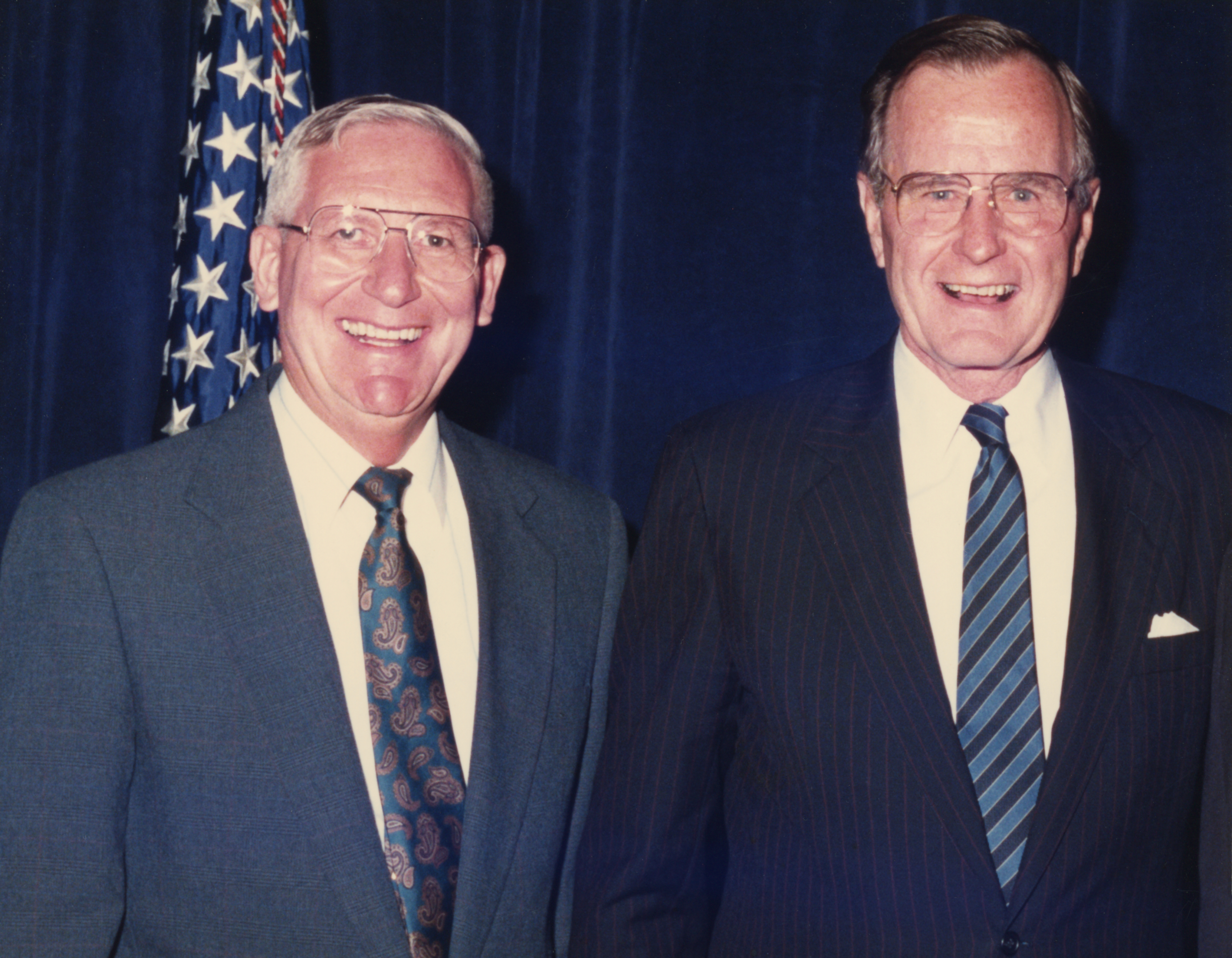

== Biography ==
Born in Deposit, New York, Cook graduated from Hancock Central School in 1952. He earned a Bachelor of Arts in political science from Hartwick College in 1956 and received an honorary Doctor of Laws from the college in 1989. A member of Tau Kappa Epsilon fraternity, he briefly worked for the national organization after earning his undergraduate degree. He was also a lay preacher at area churches.

He became editor of the Bainbridge News in 1957, and entered the U.S. Army in 1958. Upon honorable discharge in 1960, he became editor of the Deposit Courier. In 1965, he entered public service when he was elected Delaware County treasurer and moved to Delhi, New York in December of that year. He held that position until his appointment as Delaware County commissioner of social services in 1971.

He was a member of the New York State Assembly from 1973 through 1978, sitting in the 180th, 181st and 182nd New York State Legislatures. He was a member of the New York State Senate from 1979 through 1998, sitting in the 183rd, 184th, 185th, 186th, 187th, 188th, 189th, 190th, 191st and 192nd New York State Legislatures.

During his time in the legislature, Cook represented all or parts of 11 different counties, or one-sixth of all the counties in New York State.

Cook was married to Dorothy Behrens Cook, co-founder and longtime teacher at the Delhi Christian Playschool. They had five children: Edward and David, both of whom predeceased him; Linda; John; and Jeffrey. They also had seven grandchildren at the time of his death.

Cook held numerous volunteer and civic leadership roles. He served as a trustee of Hartwick College and as a member of the Government Law Center Advisory Board at Albany Law School of Union College. He and his wife were active members of the United Ministry of Delhi, where both participated in committee work, and Charles frequently served as a lay preacher.

Cook also served as a trustee of O’Connor Hospital and chaired its annual fundraising efforts. He was a member of Friends of Bassett Hospital, the New York State Rural Health Council, and the New York State Partnership Trust.

In addition, he served on the board of directors of a campus ministry organization in Oneonta and was an honorary director of Delaware-Otsego Planned Parenthood. His advocacy for reproductive rights was recognized with a statewide award.

Cook, who had developed heart disease, retired from the Senate on the advice of his physicians at the end of his term on December 31, 1998.

In retirement, Cook taught courses in history and government at Hartwick College, SUNY New Paltz, and SUNY Delhi until his death in 2001.

== Senate career ==
Over the course of his tenure, Cook chaired the Senate committees on local government, transportation, agriculture, and education.

Cook was also the first chairman of the Legislative Commission on Rural Resources, which became known nationally for its programs to address the needs of rural residents. As chairman, he authored the legislation which established the New York State Office of Rural Health, which was later named after him, and founded the program of state grants to assist rural health care providers in extending and maintaining services in rural communities. He was credited in helping to maintain a multi-million-dollar annual budgetary appropriation to support rural hospitals in diversifying and expanding outpatient services, a program that is still in operation. He also served as a member of the Legislative Commission on Critical Transportation Choices, and the Council on Health Care Financing.

He was appointed by President George H. W. Bush and his Secretary of Health and Human Services Louis Sullivan to the National Advisory Committee on Rural Health, and in 1992 was asked to the White House to meet with the president as a representative of New York State for discussions concerning the proposed Balanced Budget Amendment.

As chairman of the Senate Education Committee, he was the original author of what ultimately became the STAR program for relief of school property taxes for New York residents.

In 1993, he participated in the Oxford University Education Round Table as an internationally recognized expert on education policy, alongside such leaders as the education ministers of Norway, Croatia, Belarus, Philippines, Russia, South Africa, Portugal, Sweden, Jamaica, Ethiopia, Hungary, and Estonia.

Cook helped broker a crucial agreement between New York City and upstate communities in resolution of the heated and protracted controversy regarding watershed regulations in the Catskill mountain region, and he authored original early intervention legislation that provided for early identification, diagnosis, and treatment of developmental disabilities in children.

In 1994, he was rumored to be high on the shortlist of prospective running mates for lieutenant governor.

== Recognition ==
Following his death on May 23, 2001, flags at the New York State Capitol were lowered to half-staff, and a flag was flown in his honor over the U.S. Capitol. In recognition of his contributions to the development, delivery, and accessibility of rural health care, New York state named the "Charles D. Cook Office of Rural Health" in his honor. Numerous other institutions and programs were also named in his memory, including the Delaware County government office building, the Children’s Center at SUNY New Paltz, a statewide nursing education partnership program, and a firefighting training center.

New York State Assembly
Preceded by Clark C. Wemple	New York State Assembly; 105th District; 1973–1978	Succeeded by Arlington P. Van Dyke
New York State Senate
Preceded by Edwyn E. Mason	New York State Senate; 48th District; 1979–1982	Succeeded by Martin S. Auer
Preceded by Richard E. Schermerhorn	New York State Senate; 40th District; 1983–1998	Succeeded by John Bonacic
