= Kripplebush Historic District =

Historic district in New York, United States

- U.S. National Register of Historic Places
- U.S. Historic district
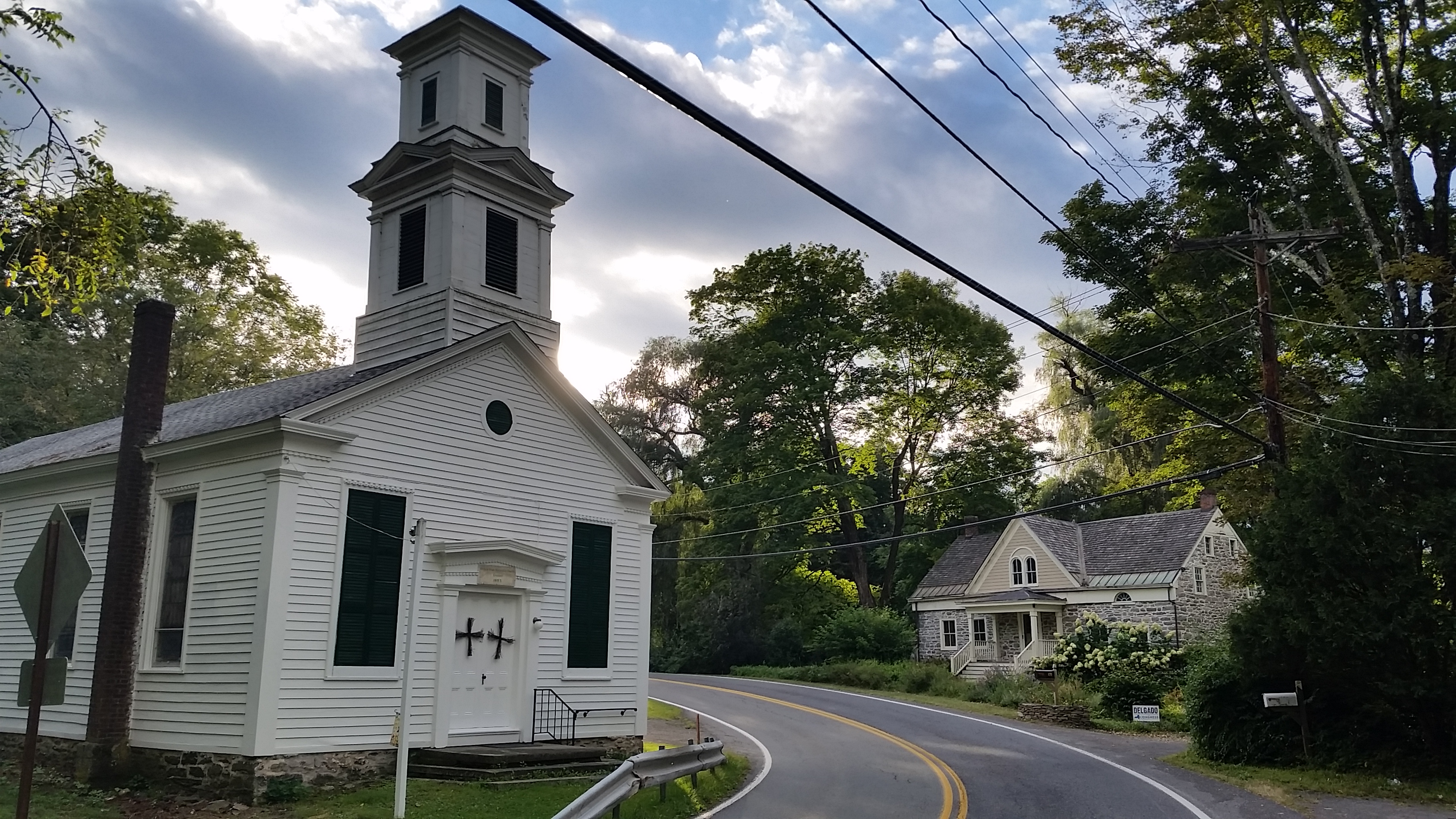
- The Methodist Church and a stone house at the entrance to the district

- Location within New York Location within the United States
- Location: Roughly, area surrounding Kripplebush and Pine Bush Rds., Marbletown, New York
- Coordinates: 41°50′18″N 74°11′17″W
- Area: 40 acres (16 ha)
- Architectural style: Federal, Greek Revival, Late Victorian
- NRHP reference No.: 94001173
- Added to NRHP: October 4, 1994

Kripplebush Historic District is a national historic district located at Marbletown in Ulster County, New York. The district includes 33 contributing buildings. It encompasses a variety of stone and frame dwellings and outbuildings at the hamlet of Kripplebush. Many of these buildings created a once-functioning commercial area but the stores have been converted to residential use, the one room schoolhouse is now a museum; only the Methodist Church, built in 1857, continues in its original function. Older maps refer to the district as Kripple Bush.

It was listed on the National Register of Historic Places in 1994.

== Gallery ==
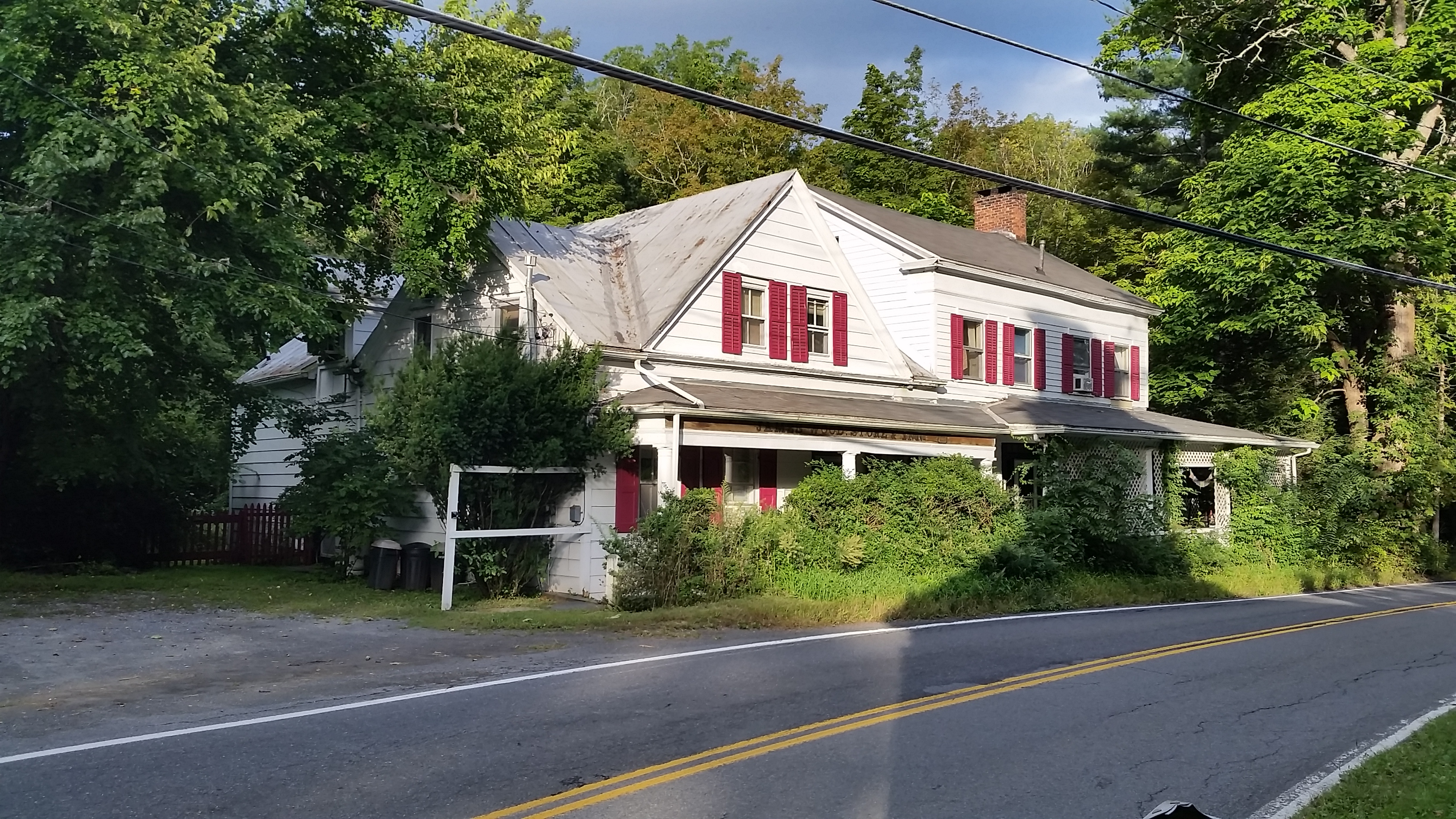
Former James Wood Store and Inn

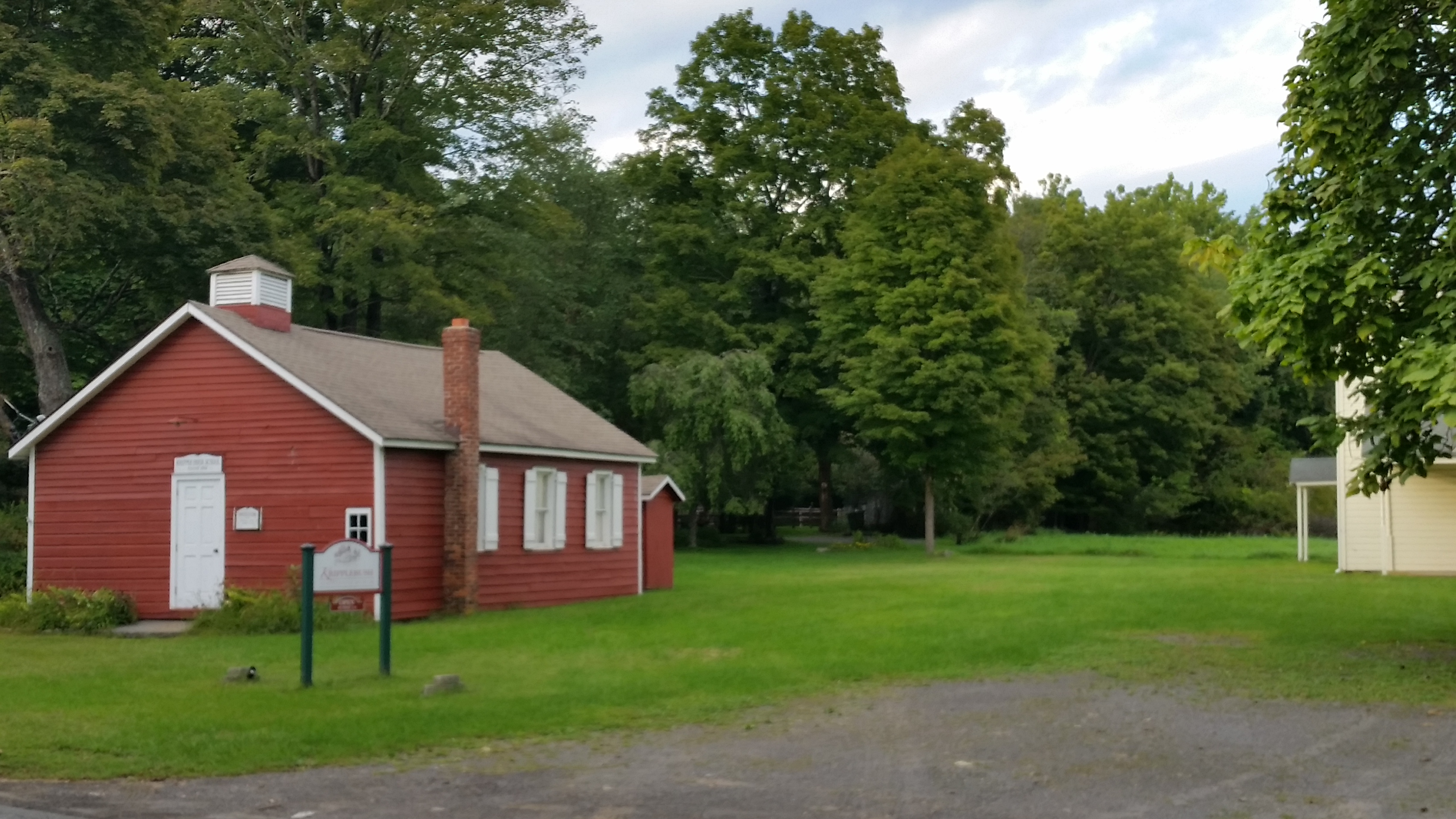
Kripplebush schoolhouse
