= Sandy Treadwell =

American politician and journalist (born 1946)

Chair of the New York Republican Party
- In office March 8, 2001 – November 15, 2004
- Appointed by: George Pataki
- Preceded by: William Powers
- Succeeded by: Stephen Minarik

60th Secretary of State of New York
- In office January 4, 1995 – April 12, 2001
- Appointed by: George Pataki
- Governor: George Pataki
- Preceded by: Gail S. Shaffer
- Succeeded by: Randy Daniels

Personal details
- Born: Alexander Ferguson Treadwell; March 25, 1946 (age 80) London, England, UK
- Party: Republican
- Education: University of North Carolina, Chapel Hill
- Profession: Sports journalist, artist
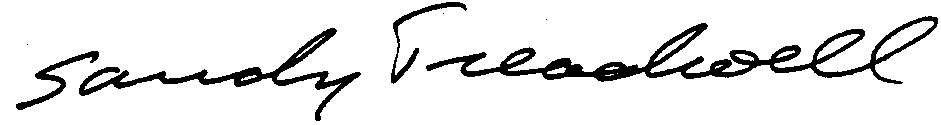
- Signature

Alexander Ferguson "Sandy" Treadwell (born March 25, 1946) is an American politician, journalist, and artist. He was Secretary of State of New York, as well as New York's representative on the Republican National Committee. He was also a writer for Sports Illustrated.

== Early life ==
Treadwell was born in London, England. His father, John F. W. Treadwell, was a Brigadier in the British Army. His mother, Susan Vanderpoel Ord, was from Albany, New York, but went to England with the Red Cross during World War II. His maternal grandfather was Joseph P. Ord, a founding executive of General Electric.

While he was still an infant, his family moved to Albany. His father resigned from his commission and worked as vice president of the English Speaking Union in New York City starting in 1949. Treadwell grew up on a 385-acre family estate called Bessboro Farm in Westport, New York, overlooking Lake Champlain. There, his father raised Holstein cattle. Treadwell had one brother, Thomas Ord Treadwell.

Treadwell went to Groton School. He then attended the University of North Carolina at Chapel Hill, graduating in 1968 with a degree in journalism. While there, he was a member of the fraternity St. Anthony Hall and was a sports writer for The Daily Tark Heel.

Treadwell served in the Army National Guard.

== Career ==
=== Journalist ===
After college, Treadwell was a sports journalist for Sports Illustrated. He wrote articles about college basketball and football. He stayed in that position for three years, leaving in 1972 to become a freelance writer. In 1973, he wrote articles for New York magazine.

He worked for Classic Sports magazine for four years in the late 1970s. Next, he tried to start a movie magazine without success. In 1987, he wrote The World of Marathons (Stewart, Tabori & Chang, 1987) a book about 26 races around the world. In its review, Library Journal wrote, "Essential reading for both the amateur and professional distance runner."

=== Politics ===
Treadwell became active in the Republican Party in Essex County, New York. In 1973, he sought the Essex County GOP endorsement for the New York State Assembly but lost badly in a county committee vote. He changed his tactics, aiming lower. He became the Republic Party chairman in Westport. In 1985, he was elected Republican chairman for the county. He was vice chairman of the New York State Republican Party from 1989 to 1994.

In 1990, Treadwell campaigned for the Republican Party across the state of New York, sharing the Republican platform at public forums. Along the way, he met George Pataki. In 1994 when Pataki ran for governor in 1994, Treadwell officially endorsed him as a county chairman, becoming one of the first county chairmen in the state to do so.

==== New York Secretary of State ====
In 1995, Governor George Pataki appointed Treadwell Secretary of State of New York. In this capacity, Treadwell earned $120,800 a year. The Department of State had 850 employees and an annual budget of $110 million during Treadwell's leadership. As Secretary, Treadwell was active in reorganizing the Department of State in order to streamline operations and improve efficiency. He reduced the agency's workforce without layoffs while holding the line on spending. He was also active in local government issues statewide. He served as the Secretary of State through 2001.

==== New York State Republican Party chairman ====
In 2001, Pataki appointed Treadwell as the Chairman of the New York Republican Party, serving through 2004. He replaced William D. Powers. Treadwell was the host state chairman of the 2004 Republican National Convention that nominated President George W. Bush and Vice President Dick Cheney for re-election. Under his tenure, Pataki was elected to a second term and Michael Bloomberg was elected mayor of New York City.

In 2004, Treadwell faced controversy after he supported Assemblyman Howard Mills as the party's nominee for the U.S. Senate against Senator Chuck Schumer over the would-be candidate Michael Benjamin. Benjamin publicly accused Treadwell and Governor George Pataki of trying to muscle him out of the Senate race and undermine the democratic process because he was half Honduran. Mills, who was nominated after numerous other potential candidates turned the race down, lost to incumbent Schumer in the largest landslide in state history.

Treadwell stepped down as state chairman in 2004 to become New York's Republican National Committeeman.

==== 2008 Congressional Candidacy ====
In April 2008, Treadwell filed to run for Congress in New York's 20th District against Kirsten Gillibrand. Treadwell signed the Americans For Tax Reform's Taxpayer Protection Pledge and ran on the promise that he will never vote to increase taxes on individuals or businesses. He supported more troops in Iraq, but noted, "We went into Iraq for the wrong reasons. Terrible mistakes were made in the first four years." He also favored a limit of four terms for Congressmen. In addition, he supported expanding broadband and cellular infrastructure. He also stated that he would not accept a salary to serve in Congress, but would donate those funds to charities.

Treadwell was endorsed by Bill Weld, the former Governor of Massachusetts. Former mayor of New York City, Rudy Giuliani, hit the campaign trail on his behalf. However, conservative commentator George Marlin criticized Treadwell, labeling him a "social moderate" and a "liberal elitist trust bab[y]". In fact, during his campaign, Treadwell noted Martin Luther King Jr. and John F. Kennedy as major influences on his life. Another New York Republican operative called him a "Rockefeller Republican".

Treadwell was defeated by Gillibrand, who was re-elected with 62% of the vote. Treadwell spent more than $6 million on his campaign; nearly $5 million was his own money. Gillibrand spend $4.49 million. It was the most expensive United States House race in 2008.

==== Other political issues ====
In 2011, Treadwell publicly supported gay marriage, and encourage Republican senators to vote for marriage equality. In 2020, Treadwell was a founder of a Bipartisan Committee to Elect Joe Biden; the committee started to support Democrat Amy Klobuchar who later withdrew from the presidential race.

=== Artist ===
At 67 years old, Treadwell became an artist, specializing in charcoal portraits. He is affiliated with the Ojai Studio Artists. His gallery is the Ojai Valley Artists at 238 East Ojai Avenue in Ojai, California.

== Personal life ==
Treadwell married Elisabeth "Libby" Ward Krautter on March 21, 1970, in Saints Chapel of Christ Episcopal Church in Winnetka, Illinois. Krautter was also a writer for Sports Illustrated and was one of the first woman journalists to cover professional football. In addition, she is a poet. They had an apartment in Manhattan, but also lived in Essex County, New York near his mother. They moved to Westport in 1972. The couple had two children: Zachary and Caroline.

In 1980, he saw runners in the New York City Marathon. The next day, he began training for the 1981 marathon. At the time, Treadwell smoked two and a half packs of cigarettes a day. He ran both the New York City Marathon and the London Marathon two times, as well as running the Moscow Marathon once.

In 2004, he purchased a home in Lake Placid, New York. He spent winters there and summers in Westport on the farm where he spent his childhood. The family also has a house in California.

In 2004, President George W. Bush appointed Treadwell to the board of trustees for the John F. Kennedy Center for the Performing Arts. In 2006, he was the president of the Lake Placid Regional Winter Sports Committee. He has also served as vice president of the Clark Foundation.

Political offices
Preceded by Gail Shaffer	Secretary of State of New York; 1995–2001	Succeeded by Randy Daniels
Party political offices
Preceded by William D. Powers	Chairman of the New York Republican State Committee; 2001–2004	Succeeded by Stephen Minarik
