= Gail S. Shaffer =

American politician (born 1948)

59th Secretary of State of New York
- In office January 1, 1983 – January 4, 1995
- Governor: Mario Cuomo
- Preceded by: Basil A. Paterson
- Succeeded by: Alexander Treadwell

Member of the New York State Assembly for the 105th District
- In office 1981–1983
- Preceded by: Arlington P. Van Dyke
- Succeeded by: Paul Tonko

Personal details
- Born: August 1, 1948 (age 78) North Blenheim, New York, U.S.
- Education: Elmira College (B.A.)

Gail S. Shaffer (born August 1, 1948) is an American politician and activist who served as the 59th Secretary of State of New York under Mario Cuomo.

Shaffer grew up on a family farm in Blenheim, New York. She graduated from Gilboa-Conesville Central School in 1966 as valedictorian. Awarded a full scholarship to Elmira College, she graduated as class valedictorian in 1970, and a Phi Beta Kappa member, with a B.A. summa cum laude in Political Science. She studied abroad for her junior year at Sciences Po. She also spent a semester of her senior year on a kibbutz in Israel.

== Career ==
Shaffer began her career in publishing before entering politics in the 1970s. She served as a town supervisor for two years and then became special assistant to Peter A. A. Berle. She later served as the executive director of the Rural Affairs Council, which was chaired by then-Lieutenant Governor, Mario Cuomo.

Shaffer was elected in 1980, as a Democrat representing a five-county, predominantly Republican district to the New York State Assembly serving in 1981 and 1982, In November 1982, she was re-elected with 68% of the vote, but did not take her seat in the 185th New York State Legislature. She was instead appointed by Governor Mario Cuomo as Secretary of State of New York, and took office on January 1, 1983.

The longest-tenured secretary of state in New York history, she served twelve years during Cuomo's three terms as governor January 1, 1983 – January 4, 1995, when she was replaced by Republican Alexander Treadwell. She was a delegate to the 1988, 1992 and 2004 Democratic National Conventions.

She went into the private sector, serving as national president and CEO of the Business and Professional Women's Foundation from 1997 to 2001, focused on economic equity for women, including workplace issues such as pay equity, family leave, fair minimum wage, Social Security, and pension reform. Returning to New York, she served as president and CEO of the Brooklyn Historical Society from 2001 to 2003. She returned to her family farm where she still resides, and became a freelance writer on public policy issues.

In September 2015, Shaffer ran for town supervisor of the Blenheim, New York. Shaffer was defeated by incumbent attorney Shawn J. Smith in the Democratic Caucus held on September 10, 2015. Although Shaffer remains a Democrat, she was endorsed by the town's Republican party for supervisor. She was narrowly defeated by Smith (by 10 votes) in the general election.

Shaffer remains an active Democrat, as a member of the Schoharie County Democratic Committee, and continues as an activist on issues including government reform, environmental quality, women's rights, civil rights, consumer rights and economic equity.
