= Anthony Welters =

American lawyer, business executive and philanthropist

- Born: 1955 (age 70–71); Harlem, New York, U.S.
- Spouse: Beatrice Welters

Anthony Welters (born 1955) is an American businessman and philanthropist. Welters Lobby, inside New York University School of Law's Vanderbilt Hall, is now named for him. He is a 1977 graduate of the school.

His portrait, which hangs in the lobby, was painted by Jamie Lee McMahan.

== Early life ==
Welters was born in Harlem in 1955. He grew in a one-room tenement with three brothers. His father worked as a shipping clerk in Manhattan's garment district. His mother died, from an allergic reaction to a penicillin injection, when Welters was eight years old.

He graduated from the New York University School of Law in 1977.

== Career ==
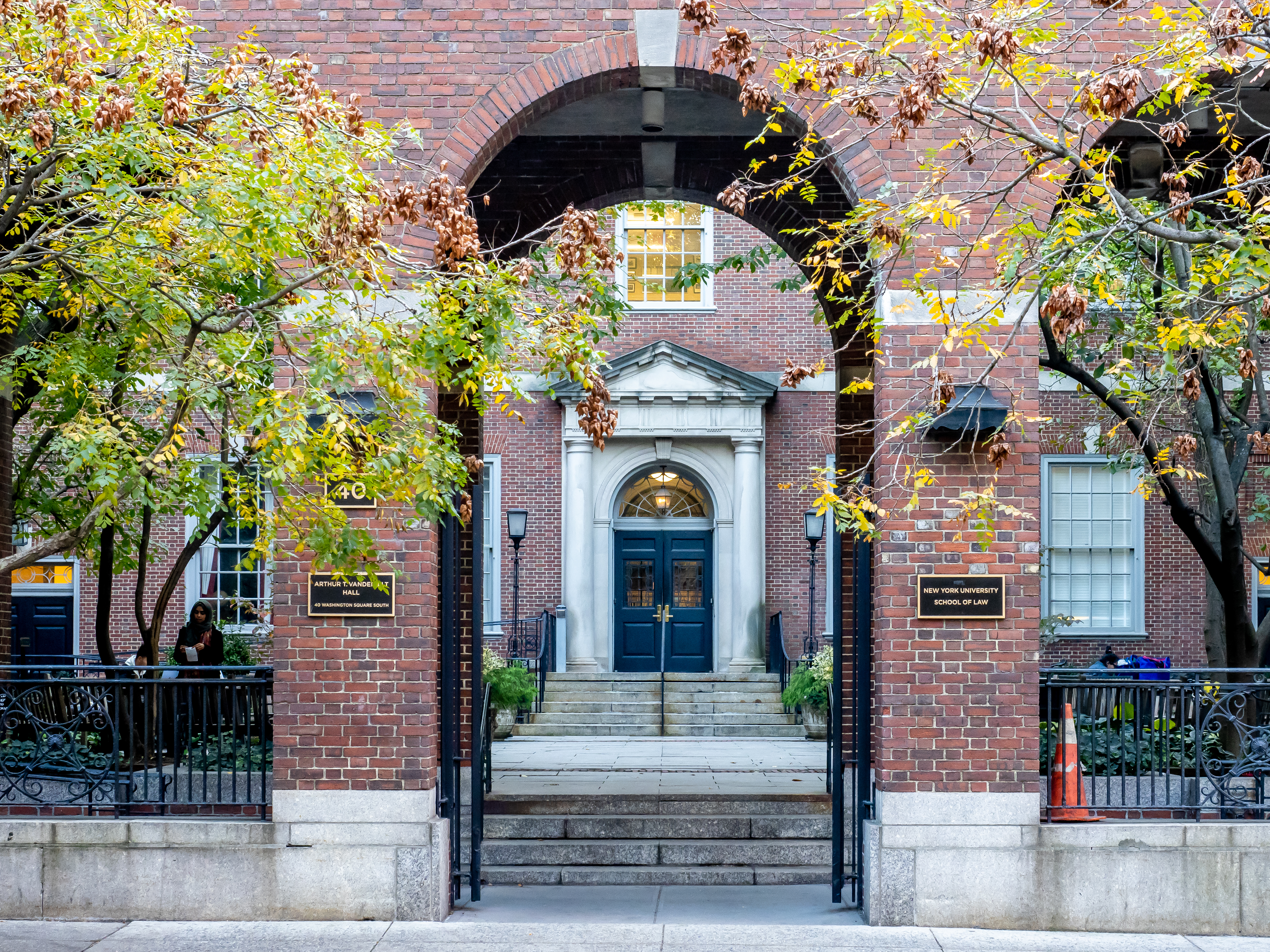
The exterior of Vanderbilt Hall at New York University's School of Law

Welters is the executive chairman of the BlackIvy Group. With his wife, Beatrice, he founded the AnBryce Scholarship Program, which provides full scholarships for first-generation students pursuing a professional degree.

Welters is vice chair of New York University's board of trustees, as well as that of the John F. Kennedy Center for the Performing Arts. He is also a founding member of the National Museum of African American History and Culture.

He is executive vice-president of UnitedHealth Group (UHG), having founded its predecessor, AmeriChoice, in 1989.

=== Awards ===
Welters has received the National Medical Fellowships Humanitarian Award, the Horatio Alger Award and the African American Chamber of Commerce Chairman's Award.

== Relationship with Clarence Thomas ==
Welters provided a $267,000 loan to Clarence Thomas in connection with the Supreme Court Justice's purchase of a luxury recreational vehicle. It is unclear to what extent Thomas paid back the loan, but some of the loan was forgiven.

== Personal life ==
In 2019, the lobby of the NYU School of Law's Vanderbilt Hall was named in his honor.
