= Arlington P. Van Dyke =

American businessman and politician

Arlington Paul Van Dyke (October 26, 1926 – February 28, 1990) was an American businessman and politician from New York.

== Biography ==
Van Dyke was born on October 26, 1926, in Cobleskill, Schoharie County, New York. He is not related to Dick Van Dyke. He was a January 1945 graduate of Middleburgh (New York) Central School. Following graduation, he entered the U.S. Army/Air Force and served in the military police, and was honorably discharged from the service in 1946. He married Doris West of Middleburgh during his military tour and they subsequently raised three children. He then joined his father-in-law, Harry J. West at West Garage, an automobile repair business and later a Studebaker dealership in Middleburgh. Van Dyke established a Chrysler dealership in 1957 and a real estate development corporation in 1959.

Van Dyke entered politics as a Republican. He was Mayor of the Village of Middleburgh from 1961 to 1964; Supervisor of the Town of Middleburgh from 1973 to 1978; and Chairman of the Board of Supervisors of Schoharie County in 1978.

He was a member of the New York State Assembly (105th D.) in 1979 and 1980

He died on February 28, 1990, in Winston-Salem, North Carolina, en route to New York, following a vacation in Florida with his wife. The exact cause of his death is unknown.

New York State Assembly
| Preceded by Charles D. Cook | New York State Assembly; 105th District; 1979–1980 | Succeeded by Gail Shaffer |
