= Bevier House Museum =

Historic house in New York, United States

- Bevier Stone House
- U.S. National Register of Historic Places
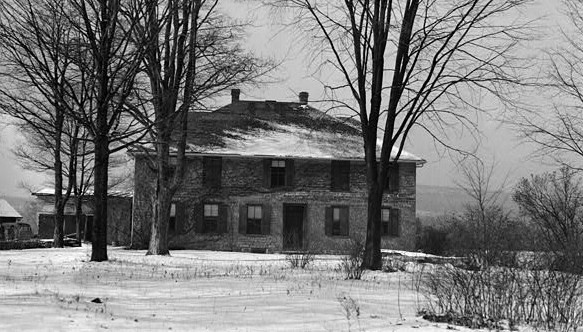
- Bevier House Museum

- Location within New York Location within the United States
- Location: 2687 NY 209, Marbletown, New York
- Coordinates: 41°53′25″N 74°6′11″W
- Built: ca.1680
- Architectural style: Colonial
- Visitation: 1,000 (2005)
- NRHP reference No.: 02000135
- Added to NRHP: March 12, 2002

The Bevier House Museum, referred to simply as the Bevier House or Bevier Stone House prior to its conversion from a private residence, is located in Marbletown, near Kingston, New York. The house is also the home of the Ulster County Historical Society and is currently open to the public as a museum.

Bevier House is believed to have been constructed around 1680 by Andries Pieterse Van Leuven. The original part of the house, currently the kitchen, was designed in the Dutch style and was probably a one-room, one-story structure. In 1715, the house was bought for 440 pounds from Pieter Andries Van Leuven by Louis Bevier, Jr., son of the New Paltz patentee, who expanded the structure and operated it as part of a large farm. The house was donated to the Historical Society in 1938 after being used by seven generations of the Bevier Family between 1715 and 1939, during which it was expanded to the two-story building currently standing.

The house was listed on the National Register of Historic Places in 2002.

The museum displays a series of additions and renovations that explain its history and provide context for the artifacts donated by the family and numerous others. The museum's collection includes farm implements, home furnishings and decor, and an array of American Civil War memorabilia relating directly to Ulster County. It also includes the earliest-known land grant map for Ulster County.
