= Candace Bond =

American businesswoman & diplomat (born 1965)

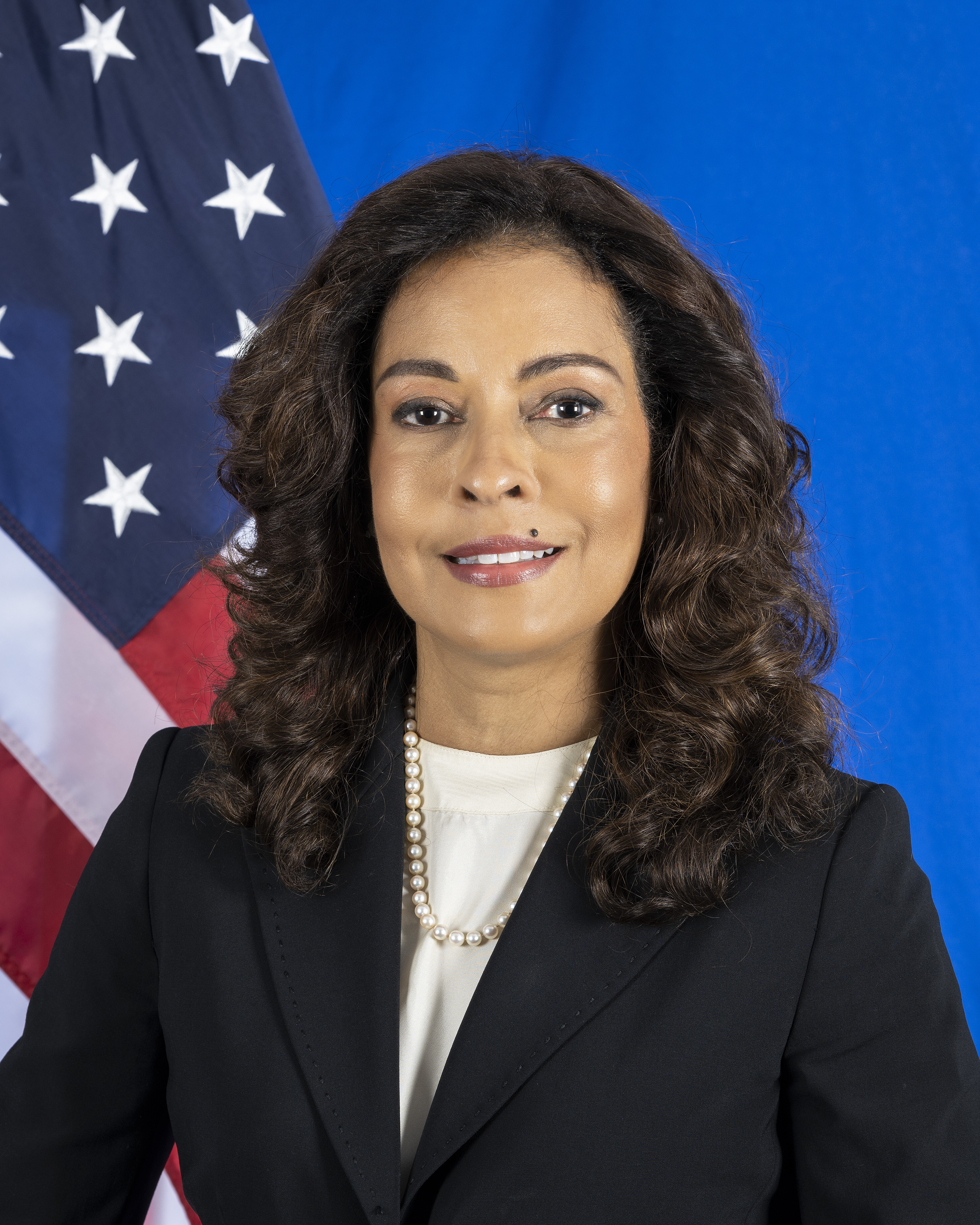

United States Ambassador to Trinidad and Tobago
- In office December 8, 2022 – January 20, 2025
- President: Joe Biden
- Preceded by: Joseph Mondello
- Succeeded by: TBC

Personal details
- Born: St. Louis, Missouri, U.S.
- Spouse: Steven McKeever
- Children: 2
- Parents: Leslie Fee Bond, Sr., MD (father); Anita Lyons Bond (mother)
- Education: Harvard University (AB, MBA)

Candace A. Bond is an American businesswoman who is the president and CEO of AESA Inc., a business advisory and community development consulting firm. She had served as United States ambassador to Trinidad and Tobago.

== Early life and education ==
Bond was born St. Louis. Her mother, Anita Lyons Bond is a civil rights advocate and academic and her father, Dr. Leslie Fee Bond, was a surgeon. After graduating from the Villa Duchesne and Oak Hill School, she earned a Bachelor of Arts degree in government from Harvard College and a Master of Business Administration from Harvard Business School.

== Career ==
=== Entertainment and media industry (1987-2004) ===
From 1992 to 1997, Bond was a vice president at Motown Records. In 2019, she was featured in The Black Godfather, a Netflix documentary about the record label. From 1997 to 2001, she was the vice president of De Passe Entertainment for special projects. From 2001 to 2003, she was the vice president of Essence and general manager for entertainment. In 2004 and 2005, she was a senior partner at Impact Strategies. From 2005 to 2010, she was a managing partner at Infusion Media Partners. She was also a business development advisor at EV Structure. Since 2010, she has been a principal at Beacon Rose Partners, a real estate investment firm. She is the president and CEO of AESA, a consulting firm that offers advisory services in community development, environmental stability, governance, education, and health equity.

=== United States ambassador to Trinidad and Tobago ===
On March 18, 2022, President Joe Biden nominated Bond to be the next ambassador to Trinidad and Tobago. Hearings on her nomination were held before the Senate Foreign Relations Committee on July 28, 2022. The committee favorably reported her nomination to the Senate floor on August 3, 2022. She was confirmed by the Senate on September 29, 2022. On November 15, 2022, she was ceremonially sworn in by Vice President Kamala Harris as ambassador, and she presented her credentials to President Paula-Mae Weekes on December 8, 2022.

== Personal life ==
Bond and her husband, Steven McKeever, have two children and live in Los Angeles. McKeever works as an attorney. Bond's older son, Brent McKeever, is a photographer.

Diplomatic posts
Preceded by Joseph Mondello	United States Ambassador to Trinidad and Tobago; 2022–2025	Vacant
