= William Powers (politician) =

American politician

William Powers is a New York Republican Party political activist. Before becoming the Republican state chairman, Powers was the chairman of the Rensselaer County Republican Committee.

Powers was an aide to Senator Al D'Amato. He was elected state chairman two months after the New York Republicans had suffered a crushing defeat in the 1990 gubernatorial election. At the time, the state committee was over $1 million in debt, and Republicans controlled only 19 of New York's 62 counties. Over the next four years, Powers led a rebirth of the party which saw the election of Rudy Giuliani as mayor of New York City in 1993 and the election of George Pataki as governor in 1994.

Party political offices
Preceded by J. Patrick Barrett	Chairman of the New York Republican State Committee; 14 January 1991 – 8 March 2001	Succeeded by Alexander F. Treadwell
