= Stone Ridge, New York =

- CDP
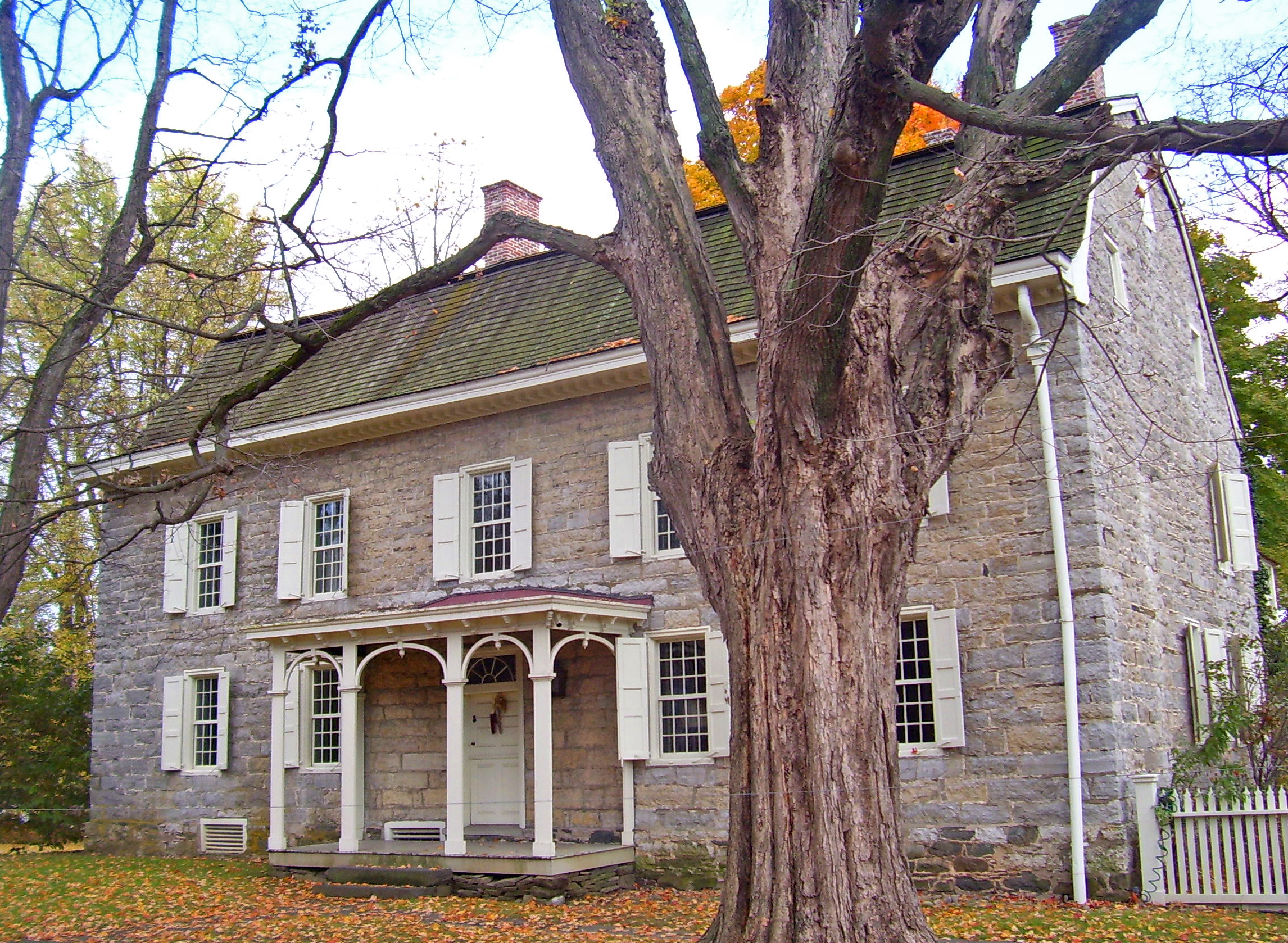
- George Washington slept in Cornelius Wynkoop's house, part of the Main Street Historic District

- Location in Ulster County and the state of New York.
- Coordinates: 41°50′45″N 74°9′23″W
- Country: United States
- State: New York
- County: Ulster

Area
  - Total: 6.00 sq mi (15.54 km^{2})
  - Land: 5.95 sq mi (15.42 km^{2})
  - Water: 0.046 sq mi (0.12 km^{2})
- Elevation: 364 ft (111 m)

Population (2020)
  - Total: 1,234
  - Density: 207.3/sq mi (80.04/km^{2})
- Time zone: UTC−5 (Eastern (EST))
  - Summer (DST): UTC−4 (EDT)
- ZIP Code: 12484
- Area code: 845
- FIPS code: 36-71597
- GNIS feature ID: 0966515

Stone Ridge is a hamlet (and census-designated place) in Ulster County, New York, United States. The population was 1,234 at the 2020 census.

Stone Ridge is located in the Town of Marbletown, along US 209 where it overlaps NY 213.

== History ==
The Main Street Historic District was listed on the National Register of Historic Places in 1988.

== Geography ==
Stone Ridge is located at 41°50'45" north, 74°9'23" west (41.845867, -74.156494).

According to the United States Census Bureau, the CDP has a total area of 5.2 square miles (13 km^{2}), of which 5.2 square miles (13 km^{2}) is land and 0.04 square miles (0.10 km^{2}) (0.76%) is water.

== Demographics ==
Historical population
Census	Pop.	Note	%±
2000	1,173		—
2010	1,173		0.0%
2020	1,234		5.2%
U.S. Decennial Census

As of the census of 2000, there were 1,173 people, 458 households, and 327 families residing in the CDP. The population density was 225.0 inhabitants per square mile (86.9/km^{2}). There were 501 housing units at an average density of 96.1 per square mile (37.1/km^{2}). The racial makeup of the CDP was 94.46% White, 1.71% Black or African American, none Native American, 1.88% Asian, none Pacific Islander, 0.51% from other races, and 1.45% from two or more races. Hispanic or Latino of any race were 3.41% of the population.

There were 458 households, out of which 30.3% had children under the age of 18 living with them, 59.4% were married couples living together, 7.0% had a female householder with no husband present, and 28.6% were non-families. Of all households 25.1% were made up of individuals, and 9.6% had someone living alone who was 65 years of age or older. The average household size was 2.50 and the average family size was 3.01.

In the CDP, the population was spread out, with 22.3% under the age of 18, 6.6% from 18 to 24, 25.3% from 25 to 44, 30.2% from 45 to 64, and 15.5% who were 65 years of age or older. The median age was 43 years. For every 100 females, there were 91.0 males. For every 100 females age 18 and over, there were 90.6 males.

The median income for a household in the CDP was $39,271, and the median income for a family was $68,977. Males had a median income of $35,000 versus $26,176 for females. The per capita income for the CDP was $21,465. About 8.3% of families and 12.2% of the population were below the poverty line, including 8.6% of those under age 18 and 7.9% of those age 65 or over.

== Education ==
The CDP is in Rondout Valley Central School District.

Private school:

- High Meadow School

Tertiary education:

- SUNY Ulster

== Notable people ==
- John Monroe Van Vleck (1833–1912), mathematician and astronomer, grandfather of Nobel Prize–winning physicist John Hasbrouck Van Vleck
- Melissa Leo (born 1960), actress
- Roger Kahn (1927–2020), author of The Boys of Summer
