= List of ambassadors of the United States to Trinidad and Tobago =

Ambassador of the United States of America to Trinidad and Tobago
- Seal of the United States Department of State

- United States ambassador flag

- Incumbent; Philip Kern; Chargé d'affaires since June 26, 2026
- Style: His/Her Excellency (formal); Mr./Ms. Ambassador (informal)
- Nominator: The president of the United States
- Appointer: The president; with Senate advice and consent
- Inaugural holder: William H. Christensen as Chargé d'Affaires ad interim
- Formation: August 31, 1962
- Website: U.S. Embassy - Port of Spain

The United States Embassy is located in Trinidad and Tobago's capital, Port of Spain, and was established there on August 31, 1962.

== List of ambassadors ==
Name	Background	Title	Appointment	Presentation of credentials	Termination of mission	Notes
William H. Christensen	Non-career appointee	Chargé d'Affaires ad interim	August 31, 1962	August 31, 1962	December 1, 1962	
Robert Graham Miner	Foreign Service officer	Ambassador Extraordinary and Plenipotentiary	October 23, 1962	December 1, 1962	Left post September 18, 1967	
William A. Costello	Non-career appointee	Ambassador Extraordinary and Plenipotentiary	September 13, 1967	October 26, 1967	Left post March 17, 1969	
J. Fife Symington Jr.	Non-career appointee	Ambassador Extraordinary and Plenipotentiary	July 8, 1969	September 11, 1969	Left post November 14, 1971	
Anthony D. Marshall	Non-career appointee	Ambassador Extraordinary and Plenipotentiary	February 15, 1972	February 22, 1972	Left post December 27, 1973	An earlier nomination of December 7, 1971 was not acted upon by the Senate.
Lloyd I. Miller	Non-career appointee	Ambassador Extraordinary and Plenipotentiary	December 19, 1973	February 8, 1974	Left post May 23, 1975	
Albert B. Fay	Non-career appointee	Ambassador Extraordinary and Plenipotentiary	February 4, 1976	February 17, 1976	Left post April 5, 1977	
Richard K. Fox, Jr.	Foreign Service officer	Ambassador Extraordinary and Plenipotentiary	July 8, 1977	July 21, 1977	Left post July 16, 1979	
Irving G. Cheslaw	Foreign Service officer	Ambassador Extraordinary and Plenipotentiary	September 28, 1979	October 18, 1979	Left post September 1, 1981	
Melvin Herbert Evans	Non-career appointee	Ambassador Extraordinary and Plenipotentiary	December 1, 1981	January 1, 1982	Died November 27, 1984	Evans left post on November 21, 1984.
Sheldon J. Krys	Foreign Service officer	Ambassador Extraordinary and Plenipotentiary	July 12, 1985	August 19, 1985	Left post April 24, 1988	
Charles A. Gargano	Non-career appointee	Ambassador Extraordinary and Plenipotentiary	July 15, 1988	August 9, 1988	Left post June 7, 1991	
Sally G. Cowal	Foreign Service officer	Ambassador Extraordinary and Plenipotentiary	August 2, 1991	August 27, 1991	Left post August 22, 1994	
Brian J. Donnelly	Non-career appointee	Ambassador Extraordinary and Plenipotentiary	July 5, 1994	September 5, 1994	Left post September 24, 1997	
Edward E. Shumaker III	Non-career appointee	Ambassador Extraordinary and Plenipotentiary	October 24, 1997	January 13, 1998	Left post March 31, 2001	
Roy L. Austin	Non-career appointee	Ambassador Extraordinary and Plenipotentiary	October 1, 2001	December 6, 2001	December 18, 2009	
Beatrice Welters	Non-career appointee	Ambassador Extraordinary and Plenipotentiary	March 10, 2010	May 11, 2010	Left post November 2, 2012	
Margaret Diop	Foreign Service officer	Chargé d'Affaires ad interim	July 2013	N/A	April 19, 2016	
John L. Estrada	Non-career appointee	Ambassador Extraordinary and Plenipotentiary	March 7, 2016	April 19, 2016	Left post January 20, 2017	
John W. McIntyre	Foreign Service Officer	Chargé d'Affaires ad interim	January 20, 2017	N/A	October 15, 2018	
Joseph Mondello	Non-career appointee	Ambassador Extraordinary and Plenipotentiary	July 2, 2018	October 22, 2018	Left post January 13, 2021	
Shante Moore	Foreign Service Officer	Chargé d'Affaires ad interim	January 13, 2021	N/A	December 7, 2022	
Candace Bond	Non-career appointee	Ambassador Extraordinary and Plenipotentiary	September 29, 2022	December 8, 2022	January 20, 2025	
Jennifer Neidhart de Ortiz	Foreign Service Officer	Chargé d'Affaires ad interim	January 20, 2025	N/A	June 8, 2026	
Mike Fitzpatrick	Foreign Service Officer	Chargé d'Affaires ad interim	June 8, 2026	N/A	June 26, 2026	
Philip Kern	Foreign Service Officer	Chargé d'Affaires ad interim	June 26, 2026	N/A	Present	

== See also ==
- Trinidad and Tobago – United States relations
- Foreign relations of Trinidad and Tobago
- Ambassadors of the United States

== Notes ==
- United States Department of State: Background notes on Trinidad and Tobago
