= Marbletown, New York =

- Town
- Location in Ulster County and the state of New York.
- Coordinates: 41°51′12″N 74°9′21″W
- Country: United States
- State: New York
- County: Ulster

Area
  - Total: 55.18 sq mi (142.92 km^{2})
  - Land: 54.47 sq mi (141.08 km^{2})
  - Water: 0.71 sq mi (1.84 km^{2})
- Elevation: 837 ft (255 m)

Population (2020)
  - Total: 5,658
  - Density: 101.3/sq mi (39.13/km^{2})
- Time zone: UTC-5 (Eastern (EST))
  - Summer (DST): UTC-4 (EDT)
- FIPS code: 36-45458
- GNIS feature ID: 0979195
- Website: Town website

Marbletown is a town in Ulster County, New York, United States. The population was 5,658 at the 2020 census. It is located near the center of Ulster County, southwest of the City of Kingston. US 209 and NY 213 pass through the town. It is at the eastern edge of the Catskill Park.

== History ==
The area was settled around 1638, and received its land patent (to Henry Beekman, Thomas Garton, and Charles Brodhead) in 1703. The community of Marbletown once served briefly as the state capital, after the city of Kingston was burned by the British during the American Revolutionary War. Part of Marbletown was used in 1823 to form the Town of Olive and another part was used in 1844 to form the Town of Rosendale. The town of Marbletown was formed in 1788.

The Bevier Stone House, Rest Plaus Historic District, Cornelius Wynkoop Stone House and Mohonk Mountain House are listed on the National Register of Historic Places.

== Geography ==
According to the United States Census Bureau, the town has a total area of 55.2 square miles (143 km^{2}), of which 54.6 square miles (141 km^{2}) is land and 0.6 square miles (1.6 km^{2}) (1.11%) is water.

The Rondout Creek and Esopus Creek flow through the town.

== Demographics ==
Historical population
Census	Pop.	Note	%±
1820	3,809		—
1830	3,223		−15.4%
1840	3,813		18.3%
1850	3,830		0.4%
1860	4,120		7.6%
1870	4,223		2.5%
1880	3,970		−6.0%
1890	3,639		−8.3%
1900	3,511		−3.5%
1910	4,713		34.2%
1920	2,017		−57.2%
1930	2,276		12.8%
1940	2,543		11.7%
1950	2,364		−7.0%
1960	3,191		35.0%
1970	4,146		29.9%
1980	4,956		19.5%
1990	5,285		6.6%
2000	5,854		10.8%
2010	5,607		−4.2%
2020	5,658		0.9%
U.S. Decennial Census

As of the census of 2000, there were 5,854 people, 2,386 households, and 1,598 families residing in the town. The population density was 107.3 inhabitants per square mile (41.4/km^{2}). There were 2,846 housing units at an average density of 52.1 per square mile (20.1/km^{2}). The racial makeup of the town was 95.46% white, 1.38% African American, 0.22% Native American, 0.70% Asian, 0.53% from other races, and 1.71% from two or more races. Hispanic or Latino of any race were 2.07% of the population.

There were 2,386 households, out of which 30.6% had children under the age of 18 living with them, 55.4% were married couples living together, 7.8% had a female householder with no husband present, and 33.0% were non-families. 26.1% of all households were made up of individuals, and 9.3% had someone living alone who was 65 years of age or older. The average household size was 2.43 and the average family size was 2.96.

In the town, the population was spread out, with 23.2% under the age of 18, 4.9% from 18 to 24, 27.5% from 25 to 44, 31.2% from 45 to 64, and 13.2% who were 65 years of age or older. The median age was 42 years. For every 100 females, there were 97.2 males. For every 100 females age 18 and over, there were 93.4 males.

The median income for a household in the town was $46,250, and the median income for a family was $54,085. Males had a median income of $40,640 versus $30,130 for females. The per capita income for the town was $23,962. About 4.4% of families and 7.3% of the population were below the poverty line, including 7.5% of those under age 18 and 2.9% of those age 65 or over.

== Communities and locations in Marbletown ==
- Atwood – a hamlet on Route 213, west of Lomontville.
- High Falls – a hamlet in the eastern area of the town (part of which is in the town of Rosendale).
- Kripplebush – a hamlet near the southern town line. The Kripplebush Historic District was listed on the National Register of Historic Places in 1994.
- Lapla – a hamlet in the northern part of the town.
- Lomontville – a hamlet northeast of Stone Ridge.
- Lyonsville – a hamlet near the southern town line, west of Kripplebush.
- Pacama – a hamlet in the northern part of the town.
- Stone Ridge – a location south of Marbletown village on Route 209
- The Vly – a hamlet in the western part of the town.

== Notable people ==
- Natalie Merchant, singer/songwriter
- Aidan Quinn, actor
- Bruce Morrow, radio personality/actor
- Rick Danko, musician
- Julia Roberts, actress sold her estate in 2009
- Leona Helmsley, businesswoman
- Rachel Weisz, actress
- Steve Buscemi, actor
- Willem Dafoe, actor
- Peter Buffett, musician and philanthropist
- Melissa Leo, actress
- Father Divine, minister and founder of the International Peace Mission movement
- Romeo Earl Muller, Jr., an American screenwriter and actor most remembered for his screenplays the 1964 TV special Rudolph the Red-Nosed Reindeer, Santa Claus Is Comin' to Town, The Little Drummer Boy, Here Comes Peter Cottontail, and Frosty the Snowman
- Dennis Crowley, entrepreneur
