= Herlihy =

Herlihy is an Irish surname. Deriving from the Gaelic "Ó hIrghiligh," which means "descendant of Irghileach," the name has connotations of long-standing heritage. The prefix "Ó" literally means "descendant" and was commonly used in Gaelic surnames.

Notable people with the surname include:

- David Herlihy (1930–1991), American historian
- David V. Herlihy (born 1958), American author and historian
- Ed Herlihy (1909–1999), American newsreel narrator
- Gavan Herlihy (born 1947), New Zealand politician
- James Leo Herlihy (1927–1993), American writer
- Maurice Herlihy (born 1954), American computer scientist
- Patricia Herlihy (1930–2018), American historian
- Thomas Herlihy (1956–2015), American politician
- Tim Herlihy (born 1966), American actor and producer

== See also ==
- O'Herlihy (surname)
- Hurley (surname)
- O'Hurley (surname)
