= James Hurley =

James Hurley may refer to:

- James Hurley (Twin Peaks), a fictional character from the television show Twin Peaks
- James Francis Hurley (born 1962), English murderer
- James R. Hurley (born 1932), Southern New Jersey politician and gambling regulator
- Frank Hurley (James Francis Hurley, 1885–1962), Australian film maker, photographer and adventurer
- Jim Hurley (1902–1965), Irish sportsman and revolutionary
- James E. Hurley (born 1955), American business executive
- James H. Hurley, protein researcher
- James J. Hurley (1915–2002), American businessman and politician
- James L. Hurley, president of Tarleton State University
