= Hurrey =

Hurrey is a surname. Notable people with the surname include:

- Adam Hurrey (born 1983), British journalist, author, and podcaster
- Frank Hurrey (1885–1953), Australian rules footballer
- Herbert Hurrey (1888–1961), Australian rules footballer

== See also ==
- Hurley (surname)
- Hurney
