= Hurl =

Hurl or HURL may refer to:

- Hawaii Undersea Research Laboratory, in the US National Undersea Research Program
- Hurl Park, Gauteng, a suburb of Johannesburg, South Africa
- H.U.R.L., a 1995 children's video game
- Hurl!, an American game show on the G4 television channel
- Hurl or Hurley (stick), a wooden stick used in the Irish sport of hurling
- A slang term for vomiting
- Hurl Beechum (born 1973), German basketball player
- Samuel Hurl (born 1990), Canadian football player

== See also ==
- Hurley (disambiguation)
- Hurling, an Irish sport
