= Hurley =

Hurley may refer to:

== Places ==
=== England ===
- Hurley, Berkshire, a village and civil parish
- Hurley, Warwickshire, a village
- Hurley Common, Warwickshire
- Hurley Lock, a weir and lock on the River Thames

=== United States ===
- Hurley, Alabama, an unincorporated community
- Hurley, Mississippi, an unincorporated community and census-designated place
- Hurley, Missouri, a city
- Hurley, New Mexico, a town
- Hurley, New York, a town
  - Hurley (CDP), New York, a hamlet and census-designated place in the town
    - Hurley Historic District, a National Historic Landmark in the hamlet
- Hurley, South Dakota, a city
- Hurley, Wisconsin, a city
- Hurley, Virginia, an unincorporated community

== People ==
- Hurley (surname)
- Hurley Goodall (1927–2021), American politician
- Hurley Tarver (born 1975), American football player
- Abu Baker Asvat (1943–1989), South African medical doctor and activist nicknamed "Hurley"

== Fictional characters ==
- Bob "Bull" Hurley, an arm-wrestler in the film Over the Top
- Big Ed Hurley, in the television series Twin Peaks
- Hugo "Hurley" Reyes, in the television series Lost
- James Hurley (Twin Peaks), in the television series Twin Peaks
- Nadine Hurley, in the television series Twin Peaks

== Other uses ==
- Hurley (album), an album by Weezer
- Hurley (stick), a wooden stick used in the Irish sport of hurling
- Hurley International, a clothing brand
- Ó Comáin, an Irish surname sometimes mistranslated as Hurley

== See also ==
- O'Hurley, a surname
- Hurly (disambiguation)
