= Pauline Mellon =

Irish mathematician

Pauline E. Mellon
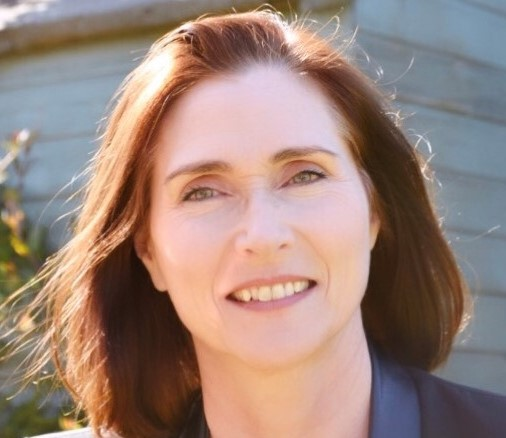
- Pauline Mellon in 2021
- Born: County Wicklow, Ireland
- Occupation: Professor

Academic background
- Education: University College Dublin
- Thesis: Symmetric Banach Manifolds (1990)
- Doctoral advisor: Seán Dineen

Academic work
- Discipline: Mathematics
- Sub-discipline: Functional analysis
- Institutions: University College Dublin
- Website: https://people.ucd.ie/pauline.mellon

Pauline E. Mellon is an Irish mathematician who works as a professor of mathematics at University College Dublin. Her research specialties include functional analysis, the theory of Banach spaces, and the symmetries of manifolds. From 2019 to 2020 she was president of the Irish Mathematical Society and has been a member of the Royal Irish Academy's Physical, Chemical and Mathematical Sciences committee.

Mellon was born in Avoca, County Wicklow. She did her undergraduate studies at University College Dublin, and performed research both at the University of Tübingen and at University College Dublin as part of her graduate studies. Her 1990 dissertation, Symmetric Banach Manifolds, was supervised by Seán Dineen. She taught at St Patrick's College, Maynooth before returning to University College Dublin as a lecturer in 1991.
