= Catasto =

Italian system of land registration

Catasto is the Italian system of land registration. The register itself is maintained at a local level by the individual councils or Comuni. The data held in the Catasto is the basis for the IMU council property tax (Imposta Municipale Unica).

There are several companies which offer easy search facilities to draw data from the various Italian local councils. This information can be used to understand the property holdings of individuals or companies and the charges (e.g. mortgages) which might be held over their ownership.

== History ==
The Florentine Catasto of 1427 provided an important source of raw historical data for historians of the Renaissance. The extensive surveys conducted by Florentine officials reveal changing forms of social organization over the period that records were collected. David Herlihy and Christiane Klapisch-Zuber's work on these records, Tuscans and Their Families is one of the first historical works to make use of computer-assisted statistical analysis.

== See also ==
- David Herlihy
