= Hurney =

Hurney is a surname. Notable people with the surname include:

- Gary Hurney (born 1980), Irish hurler and Gaelic footballer
- Marty Hurney (born 1955), American football executive

== See also ==
- Hurley (surname)
- Hurrey
