= Hurly =

Hurly may refer to:

- Hurly Long (born 1995), German golfer
- Eileen Hurly (born 1932, Benoni, South Africa), former Southern Transvaal and South Africa cricketer
- John Hurly (1878–1949), justice of the Montana Supreme Court
- William Hurly, 3rd Baronet (died 1691), Anglo-Irish politician
- Hurly baronets, a title in the Baronetage of Ireland

== See also ==
- Hurley (disambiguation)
