= Denis Hurley (hurler) =

Irish hurler (born 1933)

Personal information
- Native name: Donncha Ó hUrthuile (Irish)
- Born: 10 May 1933 (age 93) Riverstown, County Cork, Ireland
- Occupation: Company director

Sport
- Sport: Hurling
- Position: Goalkeeper
Clubs
- Years: Club
- Sarsfields; Glanmire → Imokilly
Club titles
- Cork titles: 2
Inter-county
Years	County	Apps (scores)
1953-1962	Cork	0 (0-00)
Inter-county titles
- Munster titles: 0
- All-Irelands: 0
- NHL: 0

Denis Hurley (born 10 May 1933) is an Irish former hurler, Gaelic footballer and selector. At club he level he played with Sarsfields, Glanmire and Imokilly and was also a member of the Cork senior hurling team.

== Playing career ==
Born and raised in Riverstown, Hurley's father had played with the Sarsfields club and was goalkeeper for the Cork junior hurling team that lost the 1929 All-Ireland junior final to Offaly. It was as a student at Christian Brothers College that he became involved in athletics and he won Munster and national titles over 100 yards and 220 yards. After leaving school Hurley gave up athletics to concentrate on Gaelic games and he won Cork SHC titles with Sarsfields in 1951 and 1957. He first appeared on the inter-county scene as sub-goalkeeper on the Cork minor hurling team during the 1950 Munster MHC. Hurley later made a number of appearances for the Cork senior hurling team in the National Hurling League and various tournament games and was goalkeeping understudy to Mick Cashman for the 1962 Munster SHC.

== Management career ==
Hurley's first season as a member of the Cork senior hurling team selection committee ended with the team winning the 1966 All-Ireland SHC title. He served as a selector at various times over a 27-year period and was also part of All-Ireland SHC-winning teams in 1976, 1984 and 1990. During Hurley's tenure as a selector, Cork also won eight Munster SHC titles and the National Hurling League.

== Honours ==
=== Player ===
Sarsfields

- Cork Senior Hurling Championship: 1951, 1957

=== Selector ===
Cork

- All-Ireland Senior Hurling Championship: 1966, 1976, 1984, 1990
- Munster Senior Hurling Championship: 1966, 1976, 1982, 1983, 1984, 1985, 1990, 1992
- National Hurling League: 1992-93
