= Maurice Herlihy =

American computer scientist

- Born: January 1, 1954 (age 72)
- Parents: David Herlihy (father); Patricia Herlihy (mother)
- Relatives: David V. Herlihy (brother)
- Scientific career
- Fields: Computer science
- Workplaces: Brown University

Maurice Peter Herlihy (born 4 January 1954) is an American computer scientist active in the field of multiprocessor synchronization. Herlihy has contributed to areas including theoretical foundations of wait-free synchronization, linearizable data structures, applications of combinatorial topology to distributed computing, as well as hardware and software transactional memory. He is the An Wang Professor of Computer Science at Brown University, where he has been a member of the faculty since 1994.

Herlihy was elected a member of the National Academy of Engineering in 2013 for concurrent computing techniques for linearizability, non-blocking data structures, and transactional memory.

He is the son of historians David Herlihy and Patricia Herlihy. His brother, David V. Herlihy, is also a historian.

== Recognition ==
- 2003 Dijkstra Prize
- 2004 Gödel Prize
- 2005 Fellow of the Association for Computing Machinery
- 2012 Dijkstra Prize
- 2013 W. Wallace McDowell Award
- 2013 National Academy of Engineering
- 2014 National Academy of Inventors Fellow
- 2015 American Academy of Arts and Sciences Member
- 2022 Dijkstra Prize
- 2025 Honorary Doctorate in Informatics from Università della Svizzera italiana in Lugano, Switzerland
- 2025 Honorary Doctorate in Informatics from Technion
