= Seán Dineen =

Irish mathematician (1944–2024)

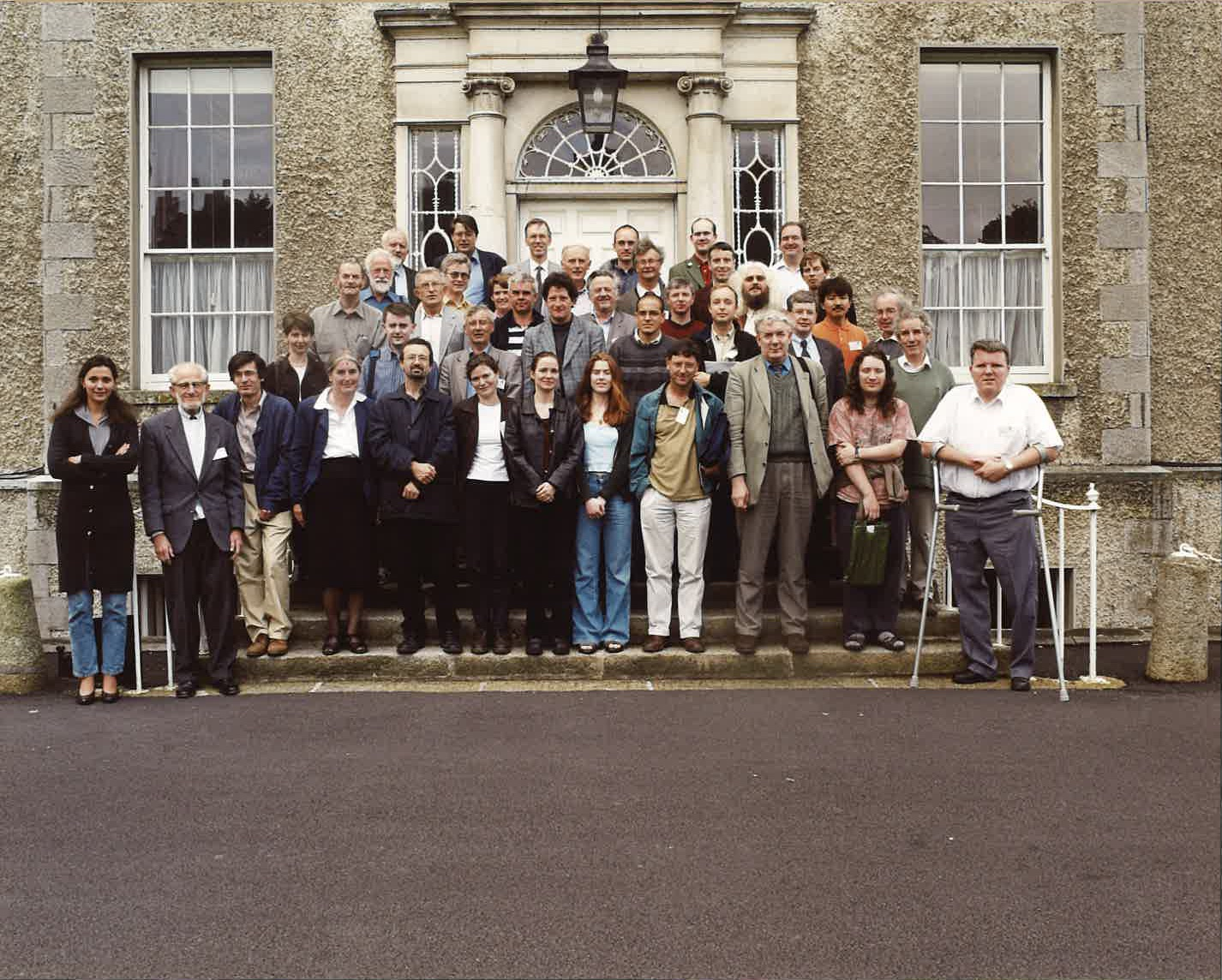
Irish Mathematical Society Annual meeting in Maynooth in 2000. Seán Dineen is directly behind the woman who is 6th from the left in the front row.

Seán Dineen (12 February 1944 – 18 January 2024) was an Irish mathematician specialising in complex analysis. His academic career was spent, in the main, at University College Dublin (UCD) where he was Professor of Mathematics, serving as Head of Department and as Head of the School of Mathematical Sciences before retiring in 2009. Dineen died on 18 January 2024, at the age of 79.

== Education ==
Seán Dineen was born in Clonakilty, Co. Cork, Ireland on 12 February 1944. He attended St Mary's, the first secondary school for boys in Clonakilty, which his parents Jerry (Jeremiah) and Margaret Dineen had founded in 1938. His father had died in 1953 and the school was subsequently run by his mother. He entered University College Cork (UCC) in 1961 to study mathematics, graduating with honours BSc in mathematics in 1964. While at UCC, he was involved in setting up the student mathematics society there. His tutors and lecturers included Finbarr Holland, Michael Mortell, Tagdh Carey, Paddy Kennedy, Paddy Barry and Siobhán O'Shea (later Siobhán Vernon). He completed his MSc there in 1965, and was awarded a National University of Ireland Travelling Studentship.

Dineen was the first student of pure mathematics from UCC to travel to the USA to do his doctorate, where he did his coursework in the University of Maryland. His official supervisor there was John Horvath, but his PhD research was carried out in Rio de Janeiro at Instituto Nacional de Matemática Pura e Aplicada (IMPA) under the supervision of Leopoldo Nachbin. He completed his thesis on "Holomorphy Types on a Banach Space" in 1970.

== UCD Career ==
Dineen spent the year 1969-1970 at Johns Hopkins as an instructor before returning to Ireland. After two years at the Dublin Institute for Advanced Studies (DIAS), he secured a position at University College Dublin. Seven years later, in 1979, he was appointed to the professorship and chair of mathematics vacated by J. R. Timoney. He spent the rest of his career there, formally retiring in 2009.

== Mathematics ==
Dineen's work has principally been in the area of infinite dimensional complex analysis and the topological structure of spaces of Holomorphic functions. He later worked on bounded symmetric domains and spectral theory, among other topics. He has said "If you want to stay active as a research mathematician, you have to reinvent yourself regularly".

His academic footprint includes 10 books and/or monographs, over 100 peer-reviewed research articles, over 4000 citations, 11 PhD students, over 40 collaborators, and the organisation of numerous mathematical conferences and meetings. In 1987 he was elected to the Royal Irish Academy.

== Selected papers ==
- Dineen, Seán "The second dual of a JB∗ triple system. Complex analysis, functional analysis and approximation theory". (Campinas, 1984), 67–69, North-Holland Math. Stud., 125, Notas Mat., 110, North-Holland, Amsterdam, 1986.
- Dineen, Seán "Complete holomorphic vector fields on the second dual of a Banach space". Math. Scand. 59 (1986), no. 1, 131–142.
- Dineen, Seán "Holomorphy types on a Banach space". Studia Math. 39 (1971), 241–288.
- Alencar, Raymundo; Aron, Richard M.; Dineen, Seán "A reflexive space of holomorphic functions in infinitely many variables". Proc. Amer. Math. Soc. 90 (1984), no. 3, 407–411.
- Dineen, Seán; Timoney, Richard M. "On a problem of H. Bohr". Bull. Soc. Roy. Sci. Liège 60 (1991), no. 6, 401–404.
- Dineen, Seán; Timoney, Richard M.; Vigué, Jean-Pierre "Pseudodistances invariantes sur les domaines d'un espace localement convexe". Ann. Scuola Norm. Sup. Pisa Cl. Sci. (4) 12 (1985), no. 4, 515–529.
- Dineen, Seán; Timoney, Richard M. "Absolute bases, tensor products and a theorem of Bohr". Studia Math. 94 (1989), no. 3, 227–234.
- Dineen, Seán; Mellon, Pauline "Holomorphic functions on symmetric Banach manifolds of compact type are constant". Math. Z. 229 (1998), no. 4, 753–765.
- Dineen, Seán; Mackey, Michael; Mellon, Pauline "The density property for JB∗-triples". Studia Math. 137 (1999), no. 2, 143–160.
- Dineen, Seán; Patyi, Imre; Venkova, Milena "Inverses depending holomorphically on a parameter in a Banach space". J. Funct. Anal. 237 (2006), no. 1, 338–349.
- Dineen, Seán; Mujica, Jorge "A monomial basis for the holomorphic functions on $c_0$". Proc. Amer. Math. Soc. 141 (2013), no. 5, 1663–1672.
- Dineen, Seán; Harte, Robin E. "Banach-valued axiomatic spectra". Studia Math. 175 (2006), no. 3, 213–232.
- Dineen, Seán; Galindo, Pablo; García, Domingo; Maestre, "Manuel Linearization of holomorphic mappings on fully nuclear spaces with a basis". Glasgow Math. J. 36 (1994), no. 2, 201–208.

== Selected books ==
- Analysis, a Gateway to Understanding. World Scientific, 2012, 320pp.
- Black-Scholes Formula. Second edition. Graduate Studies in Mathematics, 70. American Mathematical Society, Providence, RI, 2013. xiv+305
- Probability Theory in Finance. A Mathematical Guide to the Black-Scholes formula. Graduate Studies in Mathematics, 70. American Mathematical Society, Providence, RI, 2005. xiv+294 pp.
- Complex Analysis on Infinite-Dimensional Spaces. Springer Monographs in Mathematics. Springer-Verlag London, Ltd., London, 1999. xvi+543 pp.
- Multivariate Calculus and Geometry. Springer Undergraduate Mathematics, Series. Springer-Verlag London, Ltd., London, 1998. xii+262 pp. Third edition 2014. xiv+257 pp.
- Functions of Two Variables. Chapman and Hall Mathematics, Series. Chapman & Hall, London, 1995. x+189 pp. Second edition Chapman & Hall/CRC, Boca Raton, FL, 2000. xii+191 pp.
- The Schwarz Lemma. Oxford Mathematical Monographs. Oxford Science Publications. The Clarendon Press, Oxford University Press, New York, 1989. x+248 pp.
