= O'Herlihy =

O'Herlihy is a surname of Irish origin. The principal concentrations of O'Herlihy are found in County Cork.

== Persons with the surname ==
- Bill O'Herlihy (1938–2015), Irish public relations executive and television broadcaster.
- Dan O'Herlihy (1919–2005), Irish actor.
- Gavan O'Herlihy (1954–2021), Irish actor
- Lorcan O'Herlihy (born 1959), Irish architect.
- Micaela O'Herlihy, multimedia artist.
- Michael O'Herlihy (1929–1997), Irish television producer and director.

== See also ==
- Herlihy (surname)
- Hurley (surname)
- O'Hurley (surname)
