= Walter Ledermann =

German and British mathematician (1911–2009)

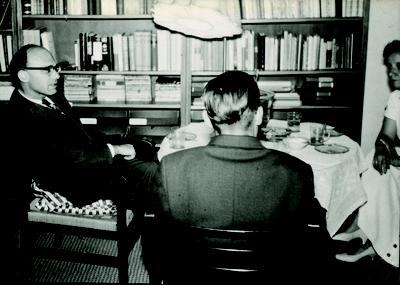
- Born: 18 March 1911; Berlin, German Empire
- Died: 22 May 2009 (aged 98); London, England
- Education: University of St Andrews
- Known for: Mathematics, matrix theory, group theory, homological algebra, number theory, statistics, stochastic processes
- Scientific career
- Workplaces: University of Edinburgh; University of Dundee; University of St Andrews; University of Manchester; University of Sussex
- Thesis: Classifying the Stabilizer of a Pencil (1936)
- Doctoral advisor: Herbert Turnbull
- Doctoral students: Thomas J. Laffey; Carol Alexander

Walter Ledermann FRSE (18 March 1911, Berlin, Germany – 22 May 2009, London, England) was a German and British mathematician who worked on matrix theory, group theory, homological algebra, number theory, statistics, and stochastic processes. He was elected to the Royal Society of Edinburgh in 1944.

== Education ==
Ledermann studied at the Köllnisches Gymnasium and Leibniz Gymnasium in Berlin, from which he graduated in 1928 at the age of 17. He went on to study at the University of Berlin, but due to the rise of Hitler and antisemitism, was forced to flee Germany shortly after he completed his undergraduate studies in 1934. Through the International Student Service in Geneva, he was able to obtain a scholarship to study at the University of St Andrews in Scotland. His doctoral work at St Andrews was supervised by Herbert Turnbull. He was awarded his PhD in 1936. Whilst working at the University of Edinburgh with Professor Sir Godfrey Thomson, Ledermann was granted a DSc in 1940 for his work with Thomson on intelligence testing.

== Career ==
He taught at the universities of Dundee, St Andrews, Manchester, and finally Sussex. At Sussex, Ledermann was appointed professor in 1965, where he continued to teach until he was 89. He wrote various mathematics textbooks.

== Publications ==
- Ledermann, Walter (1949), Introduction to the Theory of Finite Groups, Oliver and Boyd, Edinburgh and London, MR 0028309; 2nd edn. 1953; 3rd edn. 1957; 4th rev. edn. 1961
- —— (1960), Complex numbers, Library of Mathematics, Routledge and Kegan Paul, London, MR 0118652
- —— (1964), Integral calculus, Dover
- —— (1966), Multiple integrals, London: Routledge and Paul; also published 1966 (New York, Dover)
- —— (1973), Introduction to group theory, Oliver and Boyd; 2nd edn. 1996 Addison-Wesley
- —— (1977), Introduction to group characters, Cambridge University Press, ISBN 978-0-521-21486-5, MR 0460424; 2nd edn. 1987
- —— (2009), Encounters of a Mathematician, Lulu.com (published 28 September 2011), ISBN 9781409282679
- Lederman, Walter, ed. (1980), Handbook of applicable mathematics, Wiley; 10 editions from 1980 to 1991
