= Hurley (surname) =

Hurley is an English and Irish surname. It is most often a habitational name derived from Old English hyrne 'corner' plus leah 'woodland clearing'. In Ireland it may be an Anglicized form of the Gaelic Ó hUrthuile or Clan Ó Comáin.

People with the surname include:

- Alexander Hurley (1871–1913), British performer
- Andrew Hurley (academic), English translator of Spanish literature
- Andrew Michael Hurley (born 1975), English novelist
- Andy Hurley (born 1980), American drummer
- Annette Hurley (born 1955), Australian Senator
- Billy Hurley III (born 1982) American professional golfer
- An American family involved with basketball:
  - Bob Hurley (born 1947), high school coach and Hall of Famer
  - His older son Bobby Hurley (born 1971), former player and current coach
  - His younger son Dan Hurley (born 1973), former player and current coach
- Bruce Hurley (1934–2020), American politician
- Chad Hurley (born 1977), American businessman
- Charles Hurley (disambiguation), multiple people
- Chris Hurley (footballer) (born 1943), English former footballer
- Chris Hurley (police officer), Queensland police officer involved in the 2004 Palm Island death in custody
- Clyde Hurley (1916–1963), American Big Band Era musician
- Damian Hurley (born 2002), British actor and model
- David Hurley (born 1953), retired Australian general and Governor of New South Wales, Governor-general of Australia
- David Hurley (singer) (born 1962), English countertenor and member of the King's Singers
- Denis Hurley (disambiguation), multiple people
- Dick Hurley (1847–aft. 1916), American baseball player
- Douglas G. Hurley (born 1966), NASA astronaut
- Eddie Hurley (1908–1969), American baseball umpire
- Elizabeth Hurley (born 1965), British model and actress, mother of Damian Hurley
- Eric Hurley (born 1985), professional baseball pitcher
- Evelyn Hurley (1915–2024), American nun and educator
- Francis Thomas Hurley (1927–2016), American Roman Catholic archbishop
- Francis X. Hurley (1903–1976), American politician
- Frank Hurley (1885–1962), Australian photographer, member of Ernest Shackleton's exploration team
- Frank Hurley (rugby league), Australian rugby league footballer of the 1930s, and 1940s
- George Hurley (born 1958), drummer for The Minutemen, and Firehose
- Graham Hurley (born 1946), novelist
- Jack Hurley (1897–1972), American boxing promoter
- Jack Hurley (baseball) (born 2002), American baseball player
- James Francis Hurley (born c. 1966), English murderer
- Colonel John Hurley (fl. 1694), Jacobite and Rapparee
- Joseph L. Hurley (1898–1956), American politician
- Kameron Hurley, American science fiction/fantasy writer and Hugo Award winner
- Luke Hurley (born 1957), New Zealand songwriter
- Marcus Hurley (1883–1941), American cyclist
- Margaret Hurley (Connecticut politician) (1878–1975), American politician from Connecticut
- Margaret Hurley (Washington politician) (1909–2015), American politician from Washington
- Mark Joseph Hurley (1919–2001), American Roman Catholic bishop
- Marty Hurley (1946–2011), American marching band musician
- Michael Hurley (disambiguation), multiple people
- Myke Hurley, British podcaster
- Patrick J. Hurley (1883–1963), American soldier, statesman and diplomat
- Patrick Hurley, British politician
- Paul Hurley (born 1946), former American ice hockey player
- Peter Hurley, Australian Broadcasting Corporation board member
- Rosalind Hurley (1929–2004), knighted for service to medicine, science and law
- Ryan Hurley (born 1975), former West Indian cricketer
- Steve "Silk" Hurley (born 1962), American music producer and DJ
- Ted Hurley (born 1945), Irish mathematician
- Tonya Hurley, American writer and director
- William Hurley (disambiguation), multiple people

== See also ==
- Hurly, given name and surname
- O'Hurley (surname)
- O'Herlihy (surname)
