= Micka Brennan =

Irish hurler

Personal information
- Native name: Micheál Ó Braonáin (Irish)
- Nickname: Micka
- Born: Michael John Brennan; 29 September 1914 Glanmire, County Cork, Ireland
- Died: 29 November 1987 (aged 73) Wilton, Cork, Ireland

Sport
- Sport: Hurling
- Position: Left corner-forward
Club
- Years: Club
- Sarsfields
Club titles
- Cork titles: 1
Inter-county
Years	County	Apps (scores)
1932-1944	Cork	23 (17-5)
Inter-county titles
- Munster titles: 2
- All-Irelands: 2
- NHL: 2

Michael John "Micka" Brennan (29 September 1914 – 29 November 1987) was an Irish hurler who played as a left corner-forward for the Cork senior team.

Brennan joined the team during the 1932 championship and subsequently became a regular member of the starting fifteen until his retirement during the 1944 championship. During that time he won two All-Ireland medals, two Munster medals and two National League medals. Brennan was an All-Ireland runner-up on one occasion.

At club level Brennan was a one-time county club championship medalist with Sarsfields.

== Playing career ==
=== Club ===
Brennan played his club hurling with Sarsfield's and had much success during a lengthy career.

Having won a minor championship medal in 1931, Brennan subsequently became a key member of the club's senior team. In 1951 Sarsfields qualified for a senior championship decider against four-in-a-row hopefuls Glen Rovers. A 5-8 to 3-7 for the underdogs gave Brennan a Cork Senior Hurling Championship medal.

=== Inter-county ===
Brennan first came to prominence on the inter-county scene as a member of the Cork minor hurling team in 1931. He enjoyed two seasons in this grade but had little success as Cork exited the provincial championship at an early stage in both years.

While still a member of the minor grade in 1932 Brennan joined the Cork junior hurling team. He was in the full-forward line for the provincial decider and a 1-4 to 1-2 defeat of Clare gave him a Munster medal.

Brennan also joined the Cork senior hurling team in 1932 but was an unused substitute for two championships. He made his debut in 1935 in a Munster quarter-final defeat of Tipperary.

In 1939 Cork made a breakthrough in the provincial championship after nearly a decade in the doldrums. A narrow 4-3 to 3-4 defeat of Limerick gave Cork the title and gave Brennan his first Munster medal. The subsequent All-Ireland final pitted Cork against Kilkenny on the day World War II broke out, with the climax played in a ferocious thunderstorm. While a draw looked likely as the hour drew to a close Paddy Phelan sent a seventy-yard free in towards the Cork goalmouth. The sliotar was gobbled up by the defence and cleared, but only as far as Jimmy Kelly who sent it straight over the bar for a one-point lead. Immediately after the puck-out the referee blew the whistle and Cork were defeated on a score line of 2-7 to 3-3.

Although defeated in the All-Ireland decider, Cork continued their breakthrough in 1940. An 8-9 to 6-4 defeat of Tipperary in the decider gave Brennan his first National Hurling League medal. He added a second winners' medal to his collection in 1941 following a defeat of Dublin.

An outbreak of foot and mouth disease severely hampered the 1941 championship. As a result, Cork were nominated to represent the province in the All-Ireland series. Brennan lined out in the forwards for the final against Dublin, however, it turned into a one-sided affair thanks to contributing goals from Johnny Quirke and Ted O'Sullivan. At the full-time whistle Cork had won by 5-11 to 0-6. It was one of the most one-sided championship deciders of all-time, however, it did give Brennan an All-Ireland medal.

Having played no part in the 1942 championship, a 2-13 to 3-8 defeat of Waterford in 1943 gave Brennan a second Munster medal. He later lined-out in a third All-Ireland decider with Antrim becoming the first Ulster side to qualify for a final. Cork built up an unassailable 3-11 to 0-2 half-time lead over Antrim, and the final score of 5-16 to 0-4 gave Cork their second-ever hat-trick of All-Ireland titles while it also gave Brennan a second All-Ireland medal.

Brennan played his final championship game for Cork in an All-Ireland semi-final defeat of Galway in 1944. He was recalled for a tournament game against Laois in 1951 and scored six goals in the process.

=== Inter-provincial ===
Brennan also had the honour of being selected for Munster in the inter-provincial series of games. He made his debut with the province in 1935 and was a regular until his retirement in 1940.

In 1935, Brennan faced defeat to Leinster in the inter-provincial decider. Munster were also defeated by Leinster again the following year.

A third successive inter-provincial decider between Leinster and Munster occurred in 1937. A 1-9 to 3-1 victory gave Brennan his first Railway Cup medal.

After being dropped from the panel the following year, Brennan was back with Munster in 1939. Successive defeat of Leinster gave Brennan another two Railway Cup medals.

== Honours ==
=== Team ===
Ballincollig

- Cork Senior Hurling Championship (1): 1951
- Cork Minor Hurling Championship (1): 1931

Cork

- All-Ireland Senior Hurling Championship (2): 1941, 1943
- Munster Senior Hurling Championship (2): 1939, 1943
- National Hurling League (2): 1939-40, 1940-41
- Munster Junior Hurling Championship (1): 1932

Munster

- Railway Cup (3): 1937, 1939, 1940
