= Denis Hurley =

Denis or Dennis Hurley may refer to:

- Denis Hurley (bishop) (1915–2004), South African Catholic clergyman
- Denis Hurley (rugby union) (born 1984), Irish rugby union player
- Denis Hurley (hurler) (born 1933), Irish former hurler, Gaelic footballer, and selector
- Denis M. Hurley (1843–1899), American politician
- Denis Reagan Hurley (born 1937), American judge
