= Herbert Turnbull =

English mathematician

Professor Herbert Turnbull FRS FRSE
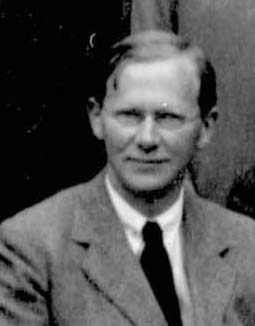
- from 1926
- Born: Herbert Westren Turnbull; 31 August 1885; Tettenhall, Wolverhampton, Staffordshire, England
- Died: 4 May 1961 (aged 75)
- Awards: Smith's Prize (1909); Fellow of the Royal Society
- Scientific career
- Institutions: University of St Andrews
- Doctoral students: Walter Ledermann

Herbert Westren Turnbull (31 August 1885 – 4 May 1961) was an English mathematician. From 1921 to 1950 he was Regius Professor of Mathematics at the University of St Andrews.

== Life ==
He was born in the Tettenhall district, on the outskirts of Wolverhampton on 31 August 1885, the eldest of five sons of William Peveril Turnbull, HM Inspector of Schools. He was educated at Sheffield Grammar School then studied Mathematics at Cambridge University graduating MA.

After serving as lecturer at St. Catharine's College, Cambridge (1909), the University of Liverpool (1910), and the University of Hong Kong (1912), Turnbull became master at St. Stephen's College in Hong Kong (1911–15), and warden of the University Hostel (1913–15). He was a Fellow at St John's College, Oxford (1919–26), and from 1921 held a chair of mathematics at the University of St Andrews.

In 1922, he was elected a Fellow of the Royal Society of Edinburgh. His proposers were Arthur Crichton Mitchell, Sir Edmund Taylor Whittaker, Cargill Gilston Knott, and Herbert Stanley Allen. He won the Society's Keith Prize for 1923-25 and the Gunning Victoria Jubilee Prize for 1940–1944. In 1932, he was elected a Fellow of the Royal Society.

He was a keen mountain climber and served as President of the Scottish Mountaineering Club from 1948 to 1950.

He retired in 1950 and died at Grasmere in the Lake District on 4 May 1961.

== Family ==
In 1911, he married Ella Drummond Williamson, daughter of Canon H. D. Williamson. They had one daughter.

== Selected publications ==
- The Theory of Determinants, Matrices, and Invariants. 1928.
- The Great Mathematicians. 1929.
- Theory of Equations. 1939.
- The Mathematical Discoveries of Newton. 1945.
- with A. C. Aitken: An Introduction to the Theory of Canonical Matrices. 1945.
- as editor: The correspondence of Isaac Newton, first 3 vols (1959–1961) out of a total of 7 vols (1959–77).
