= 1937 Cork Junior Hurling Championship =

Irish hurling competition

- Champions: Sarsfields (1st title)
- Runners-up: Shanballymore

The 1937 Cork Junior Hurling Championship was the 40th staging of the Cork Junior Hurling Championship since its establishment by the Cork County Board.

On 28 November 1937, Sarsfields won the championship following a 5–05 to 5–02 defeat of Shanballymore in the final at Fermoy Sportsfield. It remains their only championship title.
