= 1951 Cork Senior Hurling Championship =

Annual hurling competition season

- Dates: 8 April 1951 – 7 October 1951
- Teams: 14
- Champions: Sarsfields (1st title); Pat O'Leary (captain)
- Runners-up: Glen Rovers; Seán O'Brien (captain)

Tournament statistics
- Matches played: 13
- Goals scored: 88 (6.77 per match)
- Points scored: 138 (10.62 per match)
- Top scorer(s): Micka Brennan (9-01)

The 1951 Cork Senior Hurling Championship was the 62nd staging of the Cork Senior Hurling Championship since its establishment by the Cork County Board in 1887. The draw for the opening round fixtures took place at the Cork Convention on 21 January 1951. The championship began on 8 April 1951 and ended on 7 October 1951.

Glen Rovers were the defending champions.

On 7 October 1951, Sarsfields won the championship following a 5–8 to 3–7 defeat of Glen Rovers in the final. This was their first championship title ever.

Micka Brennan was the championship's top scorer with 9-01.

== Team changes ==
=== To Championship ===
Promoted from the Cork Intermediate Hurling Championship

- Carrigtwohill

== Results ==
=== First round ===
8 April 1951 First round	Sarsfields	7-07 - 6-01	Muskerry	Cork Athletic Grounds, Cork
	M Brennan 3-0, D Buckley 2-0, J O'Neill 1-1, D Shine 1-0, P Barry 0-3, P O'Leary 0-2, D Barry 0-1.		P Duggan 2-0, M Bowen 2-0, J Buckley 1-1, D Connor 1-0.	Referee: C Murphy (Valley Rovers)

15 April 1951 First round	St. Finbarr's	5-09 - 0-04	Duhallow	Rathluirc Sportstfield, Rathluirc
	M Finn 2-3, S Condon 1-1, S Leddy 1-1, M Kickham 1-0, J Ring 0-1, J O'Sullivan 0-1, J Sargent 0-1.		M Quane 0-2, M O'Sullivan 0-1, P Noonan 0-1.

15 April 1951 First round	Glen Rovers	8-08 - 0-03	Seandún	The Mardyke, Cork
	C Ring 3-1, S O'Sullivan 2-0, M Cullinane 1-3, D O'Donovan 1-1, J Hartnett 1-1, J Clifford 0-2.		WC Horgan 0-2, R O'Connor 0-1.

29 April 1951 First round	Blackrock	2-05 - 1-03	Carrigdhoun	Cork Athletic Grounds, Cork
	M Ryan 0-4, S McSweeney 1-0, M Cashman 0-1,		T Flynn 1-0, J Crowley 1-0 (og), R Andrews 0-1, J West 0-1, J Deasy 0-1.	Referee: M Barrett (Nemo Rangers)

29 April 1951 First round	Carbery	4-04 - 1-08	University College Cork	Innishannpn Sportsfield, Innishannon
	F Lyndon 2-0, P Riordan 1-2, J Burrows 1-1, N O'Driscoll 0-1.		B Murphy 1-0, D McCarthy 0-2, T Crotty 0-3, M Ryan 0-2, T Kavanagh 0-1.	Referee: P O'Leary (Sarsfields)

29 April 1951 First round	Imokilly	4-02 - 2-05	Avondhu	Castlemartyr Sportsfield, Castlemartyr
	L Dowling 2-0, A Ahern 2-1, J O'Sullivan 0-1.		W Griffin 1-1, D Carroll 0-2, V Fahy 0-1, Coffey 0-1.	Referee: T Barrett (St. Finbarr's)

8 July 1951 First round	Carrigtwohill	2-12 - 2-06	Rathluirc	Cork Athletic Grounds, Cork
	V Deasy 2-3, M Fuohy 0-3, S Twomey 0-2, WJ Daly 0-2, D Foley 0-1, W Moore 0-1.		M O'Toole 1-4, PJ O'Toole 1-1, D O'Toole 0-1.	Referee: C Conway (Blarney)

=== Second round ===
26 August 1951 Second round	Glen Rovers	4-04 - 3-03	Carrigtwohill	Cork Athletic Grounds, Cork
	J Clifford 1-2, D O'Donovan 1-0, S O'Sullivan 1-0, D Twomey 1-0, C Ring 0-2.		V Deasy 1-1, W Moore 1-1, M Fuohy 1-0, P O'Neill 0-1.	Referee: B Thornhill (Buttevant)

2 September 1951 Second round	St. Finbarr's	3-03 - 4-06	Sarsfields	Cork Athletic Grounds, Cork
	S Condon 1-1, M Kickham 1-0, PJ O'Connor 1-0, M Finn 0-1, J O'Grady 0-1.		M Brennan 1-0, S O'Sullivan 1-0, J Barry 1-0, E Monahan 1-0, P Barry 0-2, W O'Neill 0-1, P O'Leary 0-1, T Bowman 0-1.	Referee: C Conway (Blarney)

9 September 1951 Second round	Blackrock	4-09 - 3-04	Imokilly	Cork Athletic Grounds, Cork
	B Tobin 3-2, M O'Riordan 0-3, M Ryan 0-2, D Murphy 0-1, P Aherne 0-1, T Furlong 0-1.		A Ahern 2-0, J O'Sullivan 0-2, G Murphy 0-1, C O'Donovan 0-1.	Referee: B Thornhill (Buttevant)

- Carbery received a bye in this round.

=== Semi-finals ===
16 September 1051 Semi-final	Sarsfields	4-07 - 2-01	Carbery	Kinsale Sportsfield, Kinsale
	E Monahan 2-1, M Brennan 2-0, P Barry 0-3, J O'Neill 0-1, W Dooley 0-1, S O'Sullivan 0-1.		P O'Neill 1-0, E Driscoll 0-1.	Referee: C Conway (Blarney)

23 September 1951 Semi-final	Glen Rovers	5-07 - 4-04	Blackrock	Cork Athletic Grounds, Cork
	D O'Donovan 2-0, C Ring 1-3, D Twomey 1-0, J Lynam 0-2, J Twomey 0-1, J Clifford 0-1.		M O'Riordan 1-1, B Tobin 1-0, M Ryan 1-0, P Ahern 0-1.

=== Final ===
7 October 1951 Final	Sarsfields	5-08 - 3-07	Glen Rovers	Cork Athletic Grounds, Cork
	M Brennan 3-1, Dooley 2-1, O'Leary 0-4, P Barry 0-1, Buckley 0-1.		C Ring 2-0, Clifford 0-5, Lynam 1-0, O'Donovan 0-1, Twomey 0-1.	Referee: C Murphy (Valley Rovers)

== Championship statistics ==
=== Top scorers ===
Top scorers overall

Rank	Player	Club	Tally	Total
1	M. Brennan	Sarsfields	9-01	28
2	C. Ring	Glen Rovers	6-06	24
3	B. Tobin	Blackrock	4-02	14
3	D. O'Donovan	Glen Rovers	4-02	14

Top scorers in a single game

Rank	Player	Club	Tally	Total	Opposition
1	B. Tobin	Blackrock	3-02	11	Imokilly
2	C. Ring	Glen Rovers	3-01	10	Seandún
2	M. Brennan	Sarsfields	3-01	10	Glen Rovers
3	M. Brennan	Sarsfields	3-00	9	Muskerry
3	M. Finn	St. Finbarr's	2-03	9	Duhallow
3	V. Deasy	Carrigtwohill	2-03	9	Rathluirc
4	A. Ahern	Imokilly	2-01	7	Avondhu
4	E. Monahan	Sarsfields	2-01	7	Carbery
4	W. Dooley	Sarsfields	2-01	7	Glen Rovers
4	M. O'Toole	Rathluirc	1-04	7	Carrigtwohill

=== Miscellaneous ===
- For the first time since 1931, the championship was won by a team other than Glen Rovers or St. Finbarr's.
- Sarsfields win their first title after losing four finals.
- Sarsfields are the first non city club to win the title since 1928.
