= Frank Hurrey =

Australian rules footballer

Personal information
- Full name: Frank Steadman Hurrey
- Born: 23 June 1885; Burwood, Victoria
- Died: 19 August 1953 (aged 68); Burwood, Victoria
- Original team: Burwood

Playing career^{1}
Years	Club	Games (Goals)
1905–06	Melbourne	3 (0)
- ^{1} Playing statistics correct to the end of 1906.

Frank Steadman Hurrey (23 June 1885 – 19 August 1953) was an Australian rules footballer who played with Melbourne in the Victorian Football League (VFL).

== Family ==
One of four children, and the son of Alfred Clarke Hurrey (1855-1931), and Mary Anna Frances Hurrey (1853-1936), née Newman, Frank Steadman Hurrey was born on 23 June 1885.

He was engaged to a Miss Vera Agnes Patterson in 1913; however, they did not marry — Miss Patterson married a Donald William McKellar in June 1915.

Hurrey remained single for the rest of his life. He died on 19 August 1953.

== Football ==
Recruited by Melbourne from the Burwood Football Club, and selected at half-back flank, he was one of Melbourne's best players (in a team that only had 17 men, due to Ernest Denton's broken jaw in the first quarter) in his first senior game, the last match of the 1905 season, against Carlton on 9 September 1905.

He played two further games: against Essendon on 14 July 1906 (round 10), and against Fitzroy on 25 August 1906 (round 15).

== Teacher ==
A qualified State School teacher, he was a teacher by profession.

== Military service ==
The headmaster of the Emu Creek State School, Mandurang, Hurrey enlisted in the First AIF, at the age of 30, in October 1915. He returned to Australia from his overseas service in July 1918; and, for some time, was operating as a recruiting officer.
