= Thomas J. Laffey =

Irish mathematician

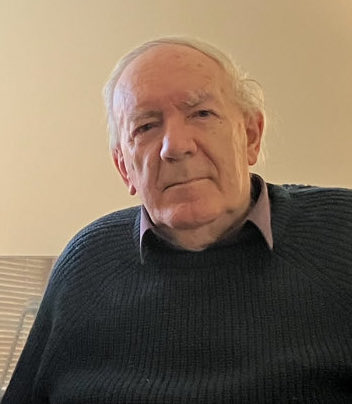
Tom Laffey in June 2024

Thomas J. Laffey (born December 1943) is an Irish mathematician known for his contributions to group theory and matrix theory. His entire career has been spent at University College Dublin (UCD), where he served two terms as head of the school of mathematics. While he formally retired in 2009, he remains active in research and publishing. The journal Linear Algebra and Its Applications had a special issue (April 2009) to mark his 65th birthday. He received the Hans Schneider Prize in 2013. In May 2019 at UCD, the International Conference on Linear Algebra and Matrix Theory held a celebration to honor Professor Laffey on his 75th birthday.

== Education and career ==
Tom Laffey was born in Cross, County Mayo. His parents were farmers, and the family had no tradition of education. His own early schooling was entirely through the Irish language, and in mathematics and physics he was more or less self-taught. The technical books he had to study were in English, which at first he found challenging. Nobody at his school had attempted honours Leaving Cert maths before. However, he got one of the highest marks in the country in the 1961 Leaving Certificate mathematics examination, thereby earning a state scholarship to university.

He attended University College Galway, earning bachelor's (1964) and master's (1965) degrees in mathematical science and also winning a National University of Ireland Traveling Studentship Prize. In 1968 he was awarded the D.Phil. by the University of Sussex for a thesis on "Structure Theorems for Linear Groups" done under advisor Walter Ledermann.

He immediately joined the staff at University College Dublin, from which he officially retired in 2009, but he has continued to publish regularly. His research has focussed on group theory, and later linear algebra too, and he has supervised five Ph.D. students. He has also played a significant role in the establishment of the Irish Mathematical Olympiad, and had frequently served the BT Young Scientists Exhibition as a judge and reviewer.

Early in his career, he developed a strong interest in matrix theory, due to the influence of Olga Taussky-Todd, with whom he often corresponded. This was cemented by a 1972–3 sabbatical spent at Northern Illinois University.

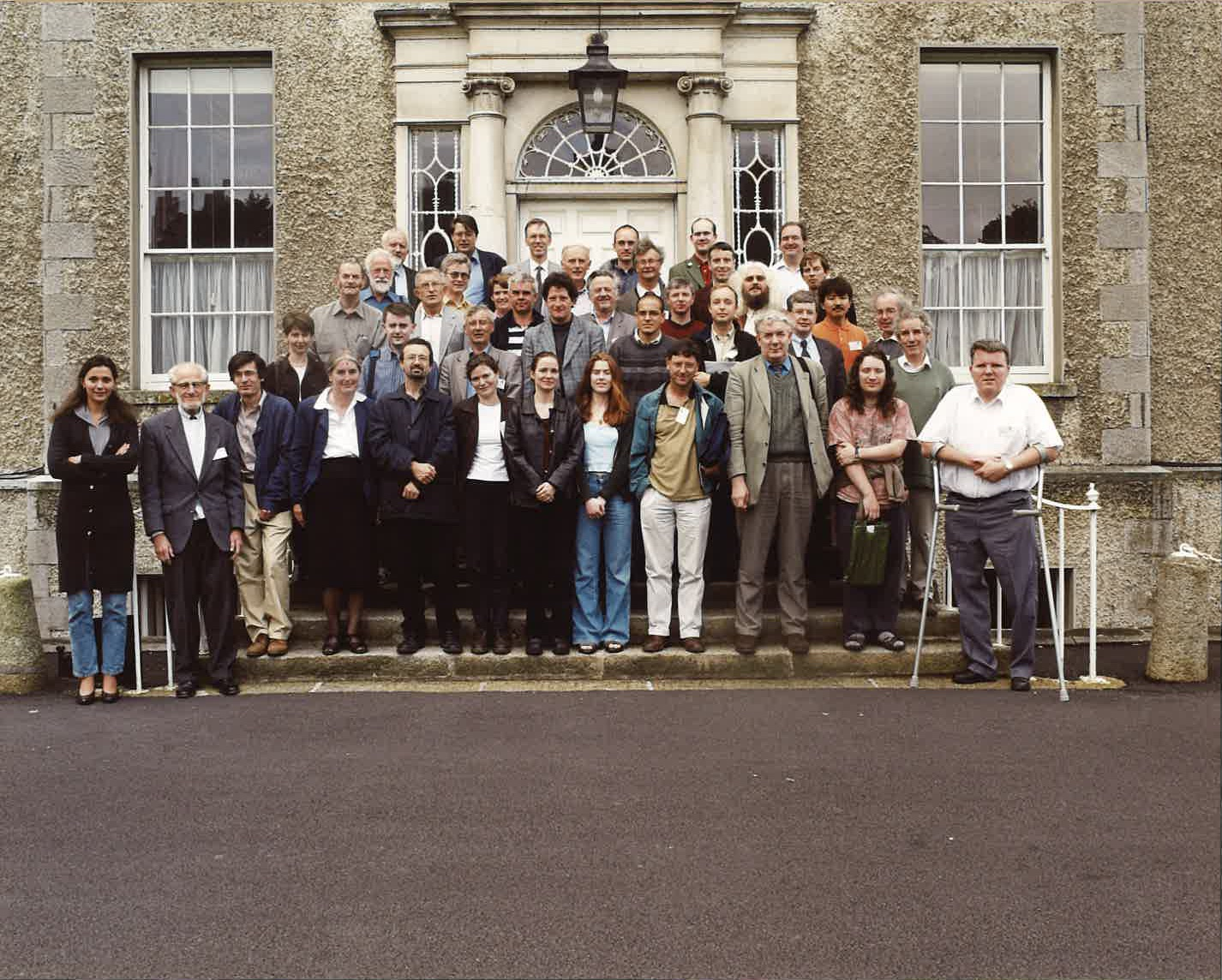
Irish Mathematical Society Annual meeting in Maynooth in 2000 Thomas Laffey is in front row, 3rd from right

He received the Hans Schneider Prize in 2013 in recognition of his constructive solution to the NIEP (Non-negative inverse eigenvalue problem) for non-zero spectra.

== Selected publications ==
- 2018 "The Diagonalizable Nonnegative Inverse Eigenvalue Problem" (with Cronin, A.). Special Matrices, 6 (1) 273–281.
- 2015 "On a conjecture of Deveci and Karaduman". Linear Algebra and its Applications, Vol 471, 15 April 2015, Pages 569–574.
- 2012 "A constructive version of the Boyle–Handelman theorem on the spectra of nonnegative matrices". Linear Algebra Appl., Volume 436, Issue 6, 15 March 2012, pages 1701–1709.
- 2006 "Nonnegative realization of spectra having negative real parts" (with H. Šmigoc). Linear Algebra Appl., 416 (1) 148–159.
- 2004/2005 "Perturbing non-real eigenvalues of nonnegative real matrices". J. Linear Algebra, 12 73–76 (electronic).
- 1999 "A characterization of trace zero nonnegative 5 × 5 matrices". (with E. Meehan) Linear Algebra Appl., 302–3.
- 1996 "The real and the symmetric nonnegative inverse eigenvalue problems are different" (with C.R. Johnson, R. Loewy). Proc. Amer. Math. Soc, 124 (12) 3647–3651.
