= Michael Hurley =

Michael Hurley may refer to:

- Michael Hurley (Australian footballer) (born 1990), Australian rules footballer
- Michael Hurley (Gaelic footballer) (born 1996), Irish Gaelic footballer
- Michael Hurley (Jesuit) (1923–2011), Irish Jesuit priest and theologian
- Michael Hurley (musician) (1941–2025), American singer/guitarist
- Michael Hurley (19th-century priest) (1780–1837), American Augustinian priest
- Michael D. Hurley (born 1976), British literary critic
- Mike Hurley (born 1958), Canadian politician
- Myke Hurley (born 1988), British podcaster

== See also ==
- Andrew Michael Hurley (born 1975), British writer
- Hurley (surname)
