= August Kauss =

American soldier during the American Civil War

- Born: November 6, 1843; Germany
- Died: 27 April 1913 (aged 69); New York
- Burial place: Hurley, New York
- Military career
- Allegiance: United States of America
- Branch: United States Army
- Service years: 1861 - 1865
- Rank: Corporal
- Units: (New York (state)) Company H, 15th New York Heavy Artillery
- Conflicts: Battle of Five Forks; American Civil War
- Awards: Medal of Honor

Corporal August Kauss (or Kautz) (November 6, 1843 – April 27, 1913) was an American soldier who fought in the American Civil War. Kauss received his country's highest award for bravery during combat, the Medal of Honor. Kauss's medal was won for capturing the battle flag of the 22nd South Carolina Volunteer Infantry at the Battle of Five Forks in Virginia on April 1, 1865. He was honored with the award on May 10, 1865.

Kauss was born in Germany. He joined the 8th New York Infantry from New York City in April 1861, and mustered out with this regiment after two years. He re-enlisted with the 15th New York Heavy Artillery in August 1863, and again mustered out with his regiment after two years. Kauss was buried in Hurley, New York.

== Medal of Honor citation ==
The President of the United States of America, in the name of Congress, takes pleasure in presenting the Medal of Honor to Corporal August Kauss, United States Army, for extraordinary heroism on 1 April 1865, while serving with Company H, 15th New York Heavy Artillery, in action at Five Forks, Virginia, for capture of battle flag.

== See also ==
- List of American Civil War Medal of Honor recipients: G–L
