= James H. Hurley =

American biophysicist

James H. Hurley is an American university professor known for his research into proteins. He won the 2014 Neurath Award from the Protein Society for a unique, recent contribution to basic science.

== Education ==
Hurley trained in protein crystallography with Robert Stroud at the University of California, San Francisco, where he completed a PhD in biophysics in 1990. He also trained with Brian Matthews at the University of Oregon, where he was a postdoctoral fellow from 1990 to 1992.

== Career ==
Prior to entering academia, Hurley worked as an investigator at the National Institutes of Health (NIH).

Hurley is the Judy C. Webb Chair and Professor of Biochemistry, Biophysics and Structural Biology at the University of California, Berkeley. His research interests focus on the interplay between proteins and lipids. Hurley received the 2014 Neurath Award from the Protein Society. The award recognizes Hurley's "ground-breaking contributions to structural membrane biology and membrane trafficking." In 2014, Hurley co-authored a study highlighting the importance of a protein called Nef in HIV.
