= James E. Hurley =

James E. Hurley was appointed to be the chief financial officer of Britannica.com Inc. on 10 November 1999.

On 3 November 2000, Hurley resigned from Britannica.com Inc. Hurley returned to his prior career in financial and general management. He is co-founder of TRU Aseptics, LLC, a technology-based beverage and ingredient processor. Prior to co-founding TRU Aseptics, Hurley was president and CEO of Vegetable Juices, Inc., a midwestern U.S. marketer and manufacturer of specialty food ingredient products acquired by France-based Naturex in 2014.

Hurley received an Master of Business Administration, with distinction, from DePaul University, where he was an adjunct member of the department of finance faculty at the Kellstadt Graduate School of Business from 1988 to 2003. He presently is a Clinical Instructor of Strategy at DePaul University's Center for Strategy, Execution and Valuation. Hurley was recognized as an Executive Scholar in Strategy and Leadership by the Kellogg School of Management in 2007. He holds a CPD in strategy from the Wharton School and is a Wharton Fellow. He is a 2010 graduate of the President's Forum advanced study program in Peer Directed Emotional Intelligence (PdEI) at the Liautaud Graduate School of Business at the University of Illinois Chicago and is also certified in Production and Inventory Management (CPIM), a Certified Supply Chain Professional (CSCP) and a member of the American Inventory and Control Society. He is a credentialed Associate Certified Coach (ACC) by the International Coach Federation (ICF). Hurley presently serves on the board of advisors of The School of Music of DePaul University. He is a licensed certified public accountant in Illinois.
