= David Herlihy =

American historian (1930–1991)

- Born: David Joseph Herlihy; May 8, 1930; San Francisco, California, U.S.
- Died: February 21, 1991 (aged 60); Providence, Rhode Island, U.S.
- Education: University of San Francisco (BA); Catholic University of America (MA); Yale University (PhD)
- Occupation: Historian
- Spouse: Patricia Herlihy
- Children: Maurice; David
- Parents: Maurice Herlihy (father); Irene O'Connor (mother)

David Joseph Herlihy (May 8, 1930 – February 21, 1991) was an American historian who served as the president of the American Historical Association. He wrote on medieval and renaissance life, and was married to fellow historian Patricia Herlihy. His study of the Florentine and Pistoiese Catasto of 1427 is one of the first statistical surveys to use computers to analyze large amounts of data. The resulting book examines statistical patterns in tax-collecting surveys to find indications of social trends.

The University of San Francisco history department named their annual award for the best student-written history paper the David Herlihy Prize, and Brown University has established a David Herlihy University Professorship.

== Life ==
David Joseph Herlihy was born the youngest of four in San Francisco in 1930 to Irishman Maurice Herlihy, of County Kerry, and Irish American Irene O'Connor. His parents had eloped in Los Gatos in California. He was a member of his school's debating team and met his wife-to-be Patricia McGahey at a match as a sophomore.

At college, he published his first article in the journal of the American Catholic Historical Society of Philadelphia; it was about Peter Yorke and the American Protective Association. He got his bachelor's degree with all As in three years from the University of San Francisco. Herb Caen reported this achievement at the time. He studied Byzantine history at the Catholic University of America. He received his master's degree in 1953. He went on to undertake a fellowship at Yale, where he worked on the Middle Ages in Italy with Robert Lopez, and obtained his Ph.D. in 1956.

He had his first son, Maurice, before bringing his young family to Pisa for a year between 1954 and 1955 (courtesy of the Fulbright Program). Bryn Mawr hired him in 1955; he was to work there for the next nine years. He wrote a dissertation on Pisa, for which Yale awarded him a doctoral degree in 1956; Yale University Press published it in 1958, titled Pisa in the Early Renaissance. The Guggenheim sent him to Florence for a year between 1961 and 1962. His wife was also in Florence that year, with a grant of her own from the Fulbright Association. The city flooded during their stay.

From 1964 to 1972, he was on the faculty of the University of Wisconsin–Madison and earned tenure there. Herlihy's next trip to Florence was 1966–1967, as fellow of the American Council of Learned Societies. He produced his second book (on Pistoia) shortly after. He was a member of both the American Philosophical Society and the American Academy of Arts and Sciences.

Herlihy died at age 60 at his home in Providence, Rhode Island, on February 21, 1991.

== Bibliography ==
- Pisa In The Early Renaissance; A Study Of Urban Growth, 1958
- Medieval And Renaissance Pistoia; The Social History Of An Italian Town, 1200–1430, 1967
- Medieval Culture and Society, 1968 (compiler)
- The History of Feudalism, 1970 (compiler)
- Women in Medieval Society, 1971
- The Social History Of Italy And Western Europe, 700–1500, 1978
- Les Toscans Et Leurs Familles : Une étude Du "Catasto" Florentin De 1427, 1979 (with Christiane Klapisch-Zuber)
- Cities And Society In Medieval Italy, 1980
- Medieval Households, 1985
- Tuscans and their Families, 1985
- Opera Muliebria : Women And Work In Medieval Europe, 1990
- The Black Death and the Transformation of the West, 1997 (posthumous, edited by Samuel Cohn)
