= Siobhán Vernon =

Irish mathematician (1932–2002)

- Born: Siobhán O'Shea; 22 February 1932; Macroom, County Cork
- Died: 18 September 2002 (aged 70)
- Education: University College, Cork
- Occupation: Mathematician
- Spouse: Peter Vernon
- Parent(s): Joseph J O'Shea and M O'Shea

Siobhán Vernon (née O'Shea) was the first Irish-born woman to obtain a PhD in pure mathematics in Ireland, in 1964.

== Early life and education ==
Siobhán O'Shea was born in Macroom, County Cork in 1932 and was the daughter of Joseph J. O'Shea and his wife M. O'Shea.

Her post-primary education was at the Convent of Mercy in Macroom, but she also attended the De La Salle, a secondary school for boys, for the higher level mathematics classes required for the Irish Leaving Certificate examination. She entered University College, Cork in 1949 and was awarded a college scholarship in 1950, based on the results of her first year examinations. She graduated in 1952 with a first class honours B.Sc. in Mathematics and Mathematical Physics. She went on to complete her M.Sc. in Mathematics and Mathematics Statistics, awarded in 1954.

== Career ==
Siobhán Vernon worked as a demonstrator in the Department of Mathematics at University College, Cork while she completed her M.Sc. and was then appointed Senior Demonstrator. Encouraged by Dr Patrick Brendan Kennedy, Siobhán began to publish research in 1956 and was appointed to the full-time post of Assistant in 1957. Continuing her research career, she spent a year as a visiting lecturer in Royal Holloway College, University of London, in 1962-63.

Returning to University College, Cork, she submitted her published papers for the award of PhD, which was awarded in 1964 by the National University of Ireland. She was appointed lecturer in 1965.

Following her marriage to geologist Peter Vernon, Siobhán reduced her teaching to half-time, as they raised their four children. She later returned to full time teaching, retiring in 1988.

== Awards ==
In 1995 she was honoured with a Catherine McAuley award as a distinguished past pupil by the Convent of Mercy in Macroom.

== Later life and death ==
Her final publication came after her retirement, when she contributed a chapter on Paddy Kennedy in Creators of Mathematics: The Irish Connection. She died on 18 September 2002.
