= Hurl Park =

- Location within Gauteng Location within South Africa
- Coordinates: 26.091°S 28.041°E
- Country: South Africa
- Province: Gauteng
- Municipality: City of Johannesburg

Area
  - Total: 0.65 km^{2} (0.25 sq mi)

Population (2001)
  - Total: 443
  - Density: 680/km^{2} (1,800/sq mi)
- Time zone: UTC+2 (SAST)
- Postal code (street): 2196

Hurl Park is a suburb of Johannesburg, South Africa. It is located in Region E of the City of Johannesburg Metropolitan Municipality.
