= Hurley Historic District =

Historic district in New York, United States

- U.S. National Register of Historic Places
- U.S. National Historic Landmark District
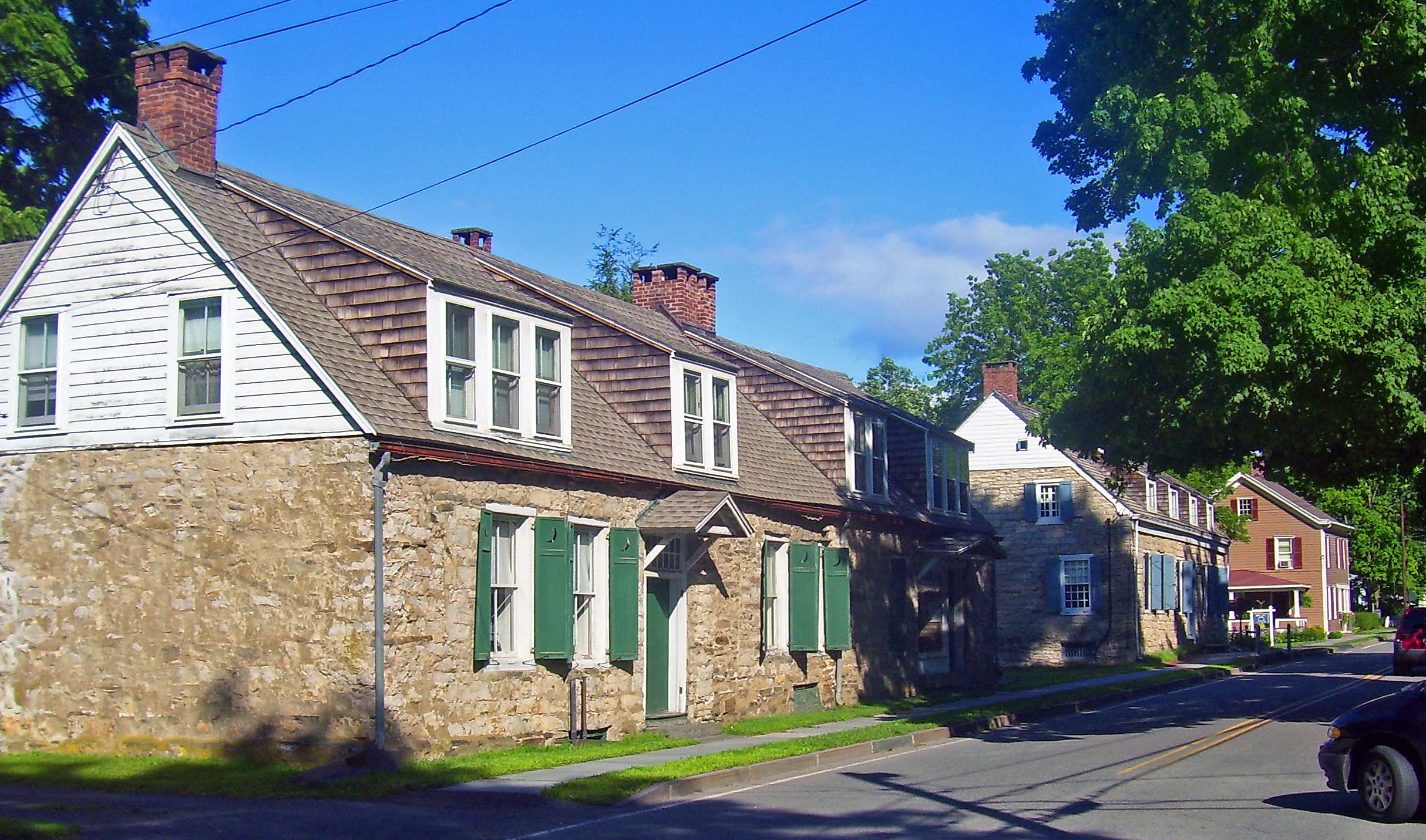
- Stone houses along Main Street

- Location within New York Location within the United States
- Location: Hurley, NY
- Coordinates: 41°55′32″N 74°03′49″W
- Area: 250 acres (100 ha)
- Built: early 1700s
- Architect: Multiple
- Architectural style: Greek Revival, Federal and/or Dutch Colonial
- NRHP reference No.: 66000577

Significant dates
- Added to NRHP: October 15, 1966
- Designated NHLD: November 5, 1961

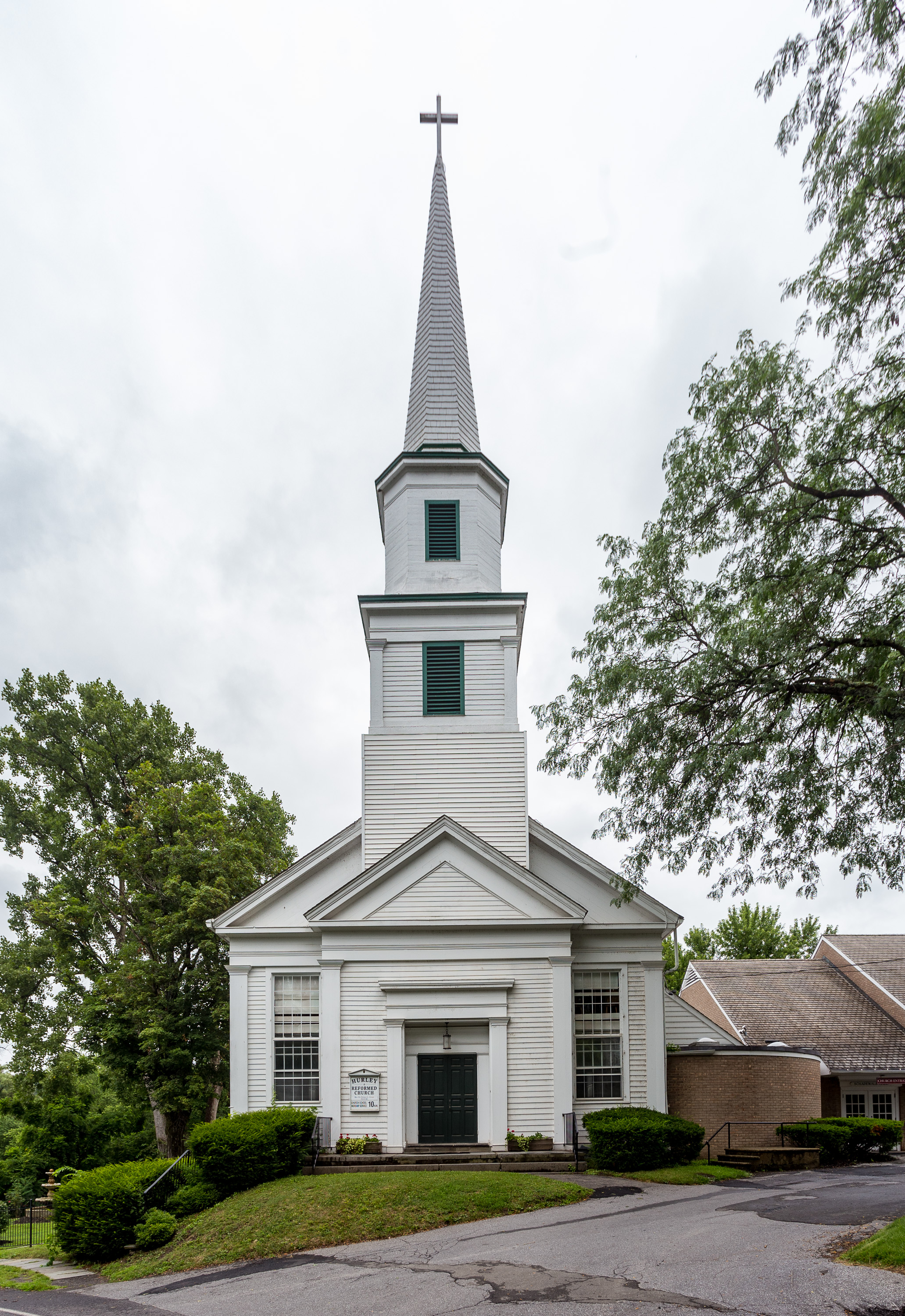
Hurley Reformed Church, built 1853, stands at one end of the historic district

The Hurley Historic District encompasses the center of the hamlet of Hurley, the main settlement area of the town of Hurley, New York. Stretched along US 209, the hamlet includes one of the finest concentrations of colonial Dutch architecture in the United States. Settled by the Dutch in the 17th century, its architecture has retained the influence of that period. The village is also historically significant as a temporary home of the seat of New York government during the American Revolutionary War. It was designated a National Historic Landmark in 1961.

== Description and history ==
Hurley is a small town located on the edge of the Catskill Mountains west of Kingston in the Hudson River Valley. Its main village lines both sides of US 209, which bisects the community, and extends along Wynkoop Road, Main Street and Hurley Mountain Road at the boundary of the Catskill Park. The village includes a collection of stone and frame structures, many dating from the 18th century. Ten of these are good examples of Dutch Colonial architecture, while the other buildings contribute to its ambience as an 18th-century village. Included in the historic district are the town cemetery, where its early settlers are buried, and the surrounding farmland.

Originally settled by the Dutch and called Nieuw Dorp ("New Village"), it came under English control soon thereafter although its inhabitants continued to speak Dutch and preserve other aspects of that culture for at least another century. Hurley is also historically important for its role in the American Revolutionary War. The newly formed New York state government moved here for two months in late 1777 while Kingston was being rebuilt. The British Army had burned it in retaliation for the creation of the state there (Albany, New York's traditional capital, was under threat of attack by a large army led by General John Burgoyne). It is thus the second of the state's three capital cities.

== See also ==
- List of National Historic Landmarks in New York
- National Register of Historic Places listings in Ulster County, New York
