= Ted Hurley =

Irish mathematician (born 1944)

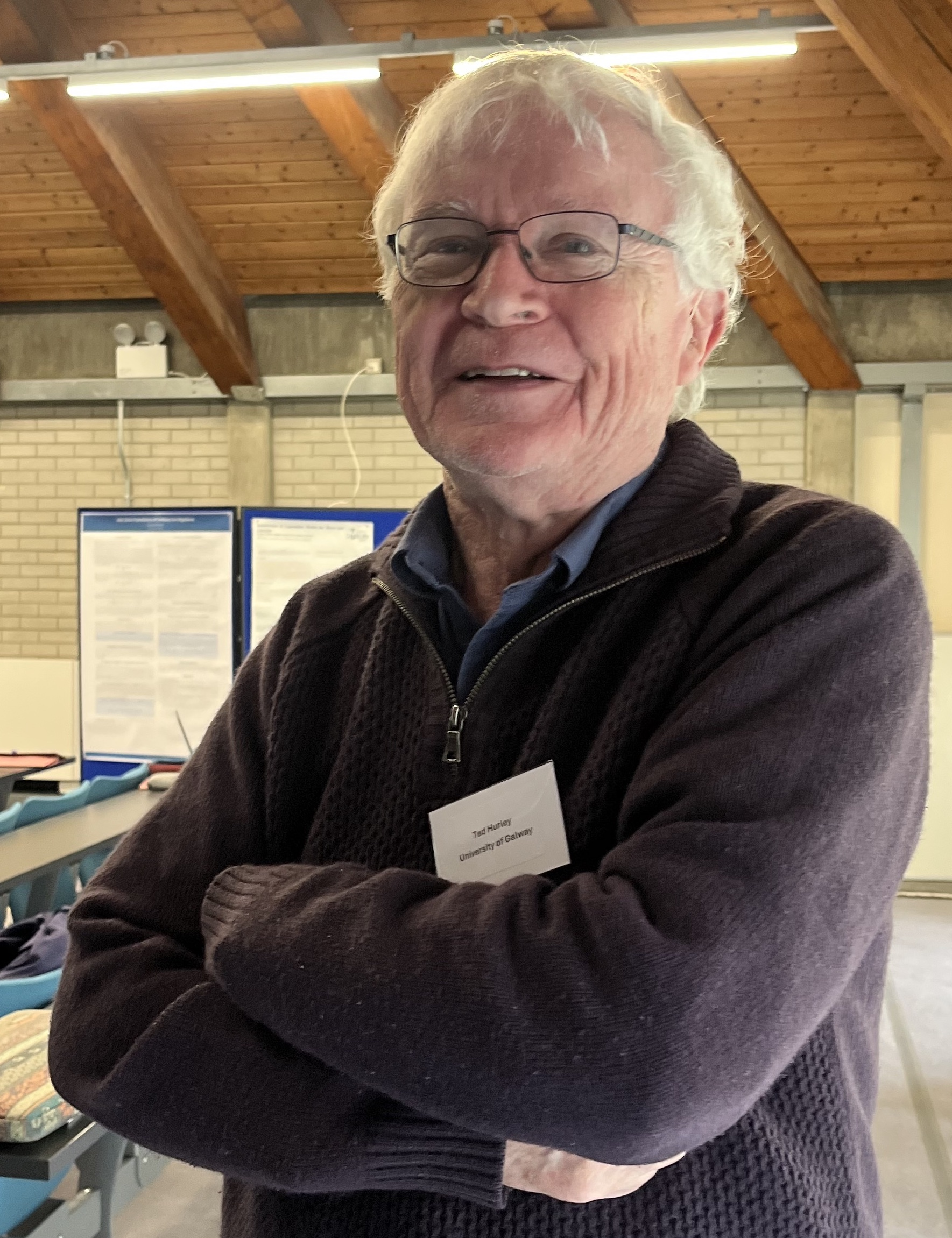
- Ted Hurley at the 2025 Irish Maths Society Meeting
- Born: 22 September 1944; Tuam, Co. Galway
- Education: University College Galway; University of London
- Scientific career
- Fields: Mathematics
- Workplaces: Imperial College London, University of Sheffield, University College Dublin, University College Galway
- Academic advisors: Karl W. Gruenberg

Ted Hurley (born Thaddeus C. Hurley on 22 September 1944) is an Irish mathematician and retired university professor specialising in algebra, specifically in group theory, group rings, cryptography, coding theory and computer algebra. In 1976, Hurley was a founding member of the Irish Mathematical Society, and he served as its inaugural secretary (1977-1979).

== Early life and education ==
Hurley was born and grew up in Tuam, Co. Galway, Ireland, to James Hurley and Bridget Walsh. He earned his BSc (1965) and MSc (1966) in mathematical science from University College Galway (UCG, now known at the University of Galway). There he won the Peel Prize in Geometry and the Sir Joseph Larmor Prize. He earned his PhD (1970) from the University of London for the thesis Representations of Some Relatively Free Groups in Power Series Rings done under Karl W. Gruenberg.

== Career ==
After positions at Imperial College London, the University of Sheffield and University College Dublin (UCD), in 1980 Hurley took up a senior position at University College Galway (later known as the National University of Ireland Galway, and now as University of Galway. He was Statutory (Senior) Lecturer in Mathematics at UCG from 1980 to 1988, Associate Professor from 1988 to 1996, and Professor of Mathematics from 1996 on. He was Head of the Department of Mathematics from 1996 to 2001 and Head of Discipline from 2001 to 2010 within the School of Mathematics.

He has also been a vocal public commentator on mathematics' education, including the importance of numeracy and mathematics to our lives, in the Irish print media and has also discussed these issues on popular national radio shows.

In 1976, Hurley was a founding member of the Irish Mathematical Society, and he served as its inaugural secretary (1977-1979). Over the years, he has been a vocal public commentator on mathematics’ education—including the importance of numeracy and mathematics to our lives—in the Irish print media and radio.

Hurley’s work was originally mostly in group theory, specifically on structural features of infinite groups (relatively free groups, commutators and powers in groups), and also group rings. Later, his interests expanded to include algebraic coding theory and cryptography. His main early works looked at existing problems and include: (i) critically improving Philip Hall’s famous work on Stability Groups, (ii) providing the general solution to Fox’s problem on the identification of ideals in a group ring, (iii) constructing counterexamples, to the Lie Dimension subgroup conjecture which had been open for many years. Work on group rings led, to new results and structures in coding theory and in cryptography. He showed that codes, including convolutional and quantum codes, could be constructed from known algebraic structures giving unique methods for constructing these to desired type, length, rate and distance. Cryptographic algebraic schemes (quantum safe) are described in [1],[2], and methods for constructing non-separable matrices for use in information and quantum theory are described in [3].

== Selected papers ==
- 2021 "Unique builders for classes of matrices Special Matrices", Hurley, Ted. Special Matrices, vol. 9, no. 1, 2021, pp. 52–65.
- 2018 "Coding theory: the unit-derived methodology". Hurley T., Hurley D., International Journal of Information and Coding Theory, 5 (1):55-80
- 2018 "Quantum error-correcting codes: the unit design strategy". Hurley T., Hurley D., Hurley B. International Journal of Information and Coding Theory, 5 (2):169-182
- 2017 "Solving underdetermined systems with error-correcting codes". Hurley, T. International Journal of Information and Coding Theory, 4 (4)
- 2014 "Cryptographic schemes, key exchange, public key". Hurley, Ted. International Journal Of Pure And Applied Mathematics, 6 (93):897-927
- 2014 "Algebraic Structures for Communications". Hurley, Ted (2014). Contemporary Mathematics, (611):59-78
- 2014 "Systems of MDS codes from units and idempotents". Hurley, Barry and Hurley, Ted (2014). Discrete Mathematics, (335):81-91
- 2011 "Group ring cryptography". Hurley, B., Hurley, T. (2011). Int. J. Pure Appl. Math, 69 (1):67-86
- 2009 "Convolutional codes from units in matrix and group rings". Hurley, T. (2009). Int. J. Pure Appl. Math, 50 (3):431-463]
- 2006 "Group Rings And Rings Of Matrices". Hurley T., Hurley D., International Journal of Information and Coding Theory, Vol 31 No. 3 2006, 319-335
- 2000 "Groups related to Fox subgroups". Hurley, T, Sehgal, S (2000). Communications In Algebra, 28 :1051-1059
- 1996 "The modular Fox subgroups". Hurley, T.C., Sehgal, S.K. (1996). Commun. Algebra, 24 (14):4563-4580
- 1991 "The Lie Dimension Subgroup Conjecture*", Thaddeus C. Hurley and Sudarshan K. Sehgal, Journal Of Algebra 143, 46-56
- 1990 "On the Class of the Stability Group of a Series of Subgroups", Ted Hurley. Journal of the London Mathematical Society s2-41(1)
- 1986 "On commutators and powers in groups II". Hurley, T.C. (1986). Arch. Math, 46 (5):385-386

== Conference proceedings edited ==
- Groups '93 Galway/St Andrews (1995, in 2 volumes), selected papers from the international conference "Groups 1993 Galway/St Andrews", University College Galway, August 1993. Edited by T. C. Hurley, S. J. Tobin, J. J. Ward, C. M. Campbell & E. F. Robertson, Cambridge (LMS Lecture Note Series 211).
- The First Irish Conference on the Mathematical Foundations of Computer Science and Information Technology (MFCSIT2000) (2002), papers from conference held in Cork, Ireland, 20 and 21 July 2000. Edited by Ted Hurley, Micheal Mac an Airchinnigh, Michel Schellekens and Anthony Seda. Elsevier Science (Electronic Notes in Theoretical Computer Science, Vol 40)
- The Second Irish Conference on the Mathematical Foundations of Computer Science and Information Technology (MFCSIT2002) (2003), papers from conference held in Galway, Ireland, 18th and 19 July 2002. Edited by Ted Hurley, Sharon Flynn, Micheal Mac an Airchinnigh, Niall Madden, Michael McGettrick, Michel Schellekens and Anthony Seda. Elsevier Science (Electronic Notes in Theoretical Computer Science, Vol 74)
- The Third Irish Conference on the Mathematical Foundations of Computer Science and Information Technology (MFCSIT2004) (2006), papers from conference held in Dublin, Ireland, 22 and 23 July 2004. Edited by Ted Hurley, Micheal Mac an Airchinnigh, Michel Schellekens, Anthony Seda & Glenn Strong. Elsevier Science (Electronic Notes in Theoretical Computer Science, Vol 161)
- The Fourth Irish Conference on the Mathematical Foundations of Computer Science and Information Technology (MFCSIT2006) (2009), papers from conference held at University College Cork, Ireland, 1 to 5 August July 2006. Edited by Ted Hurley, Micheal Mac an Airchinnigh, Michel Schellekens, Anthony Seda, Glenn Strong and Menouer Boubekeur. Elsevier Science (Electronic Notes in Theoretical Computer Science, Vol 225)
