= Charles Hurley =

Charles Hurley may refer to:

- Charles A. Hurley, former CEO of Mothers Against Drunk Driving
- Charles F. Hurley (1893–1943), Governor of Massachusetts
- Charlie Hurley (1936–2024), Irish footballer
- Charlie Hurley (Irish republican) (died 1921), Irish Republican Army officer
