= Christiane Klapisch-Zuber =

French historian, anthropologist and academic

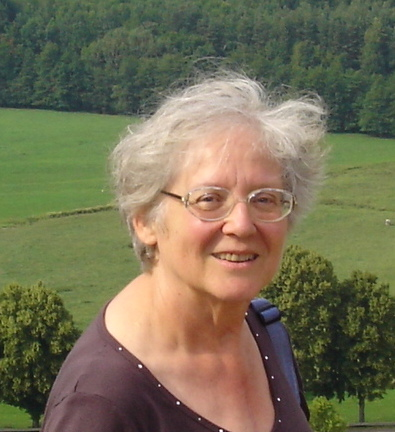
- Christiane Klapisch-Zuber in 2006.
- Born: Christiane Zuber; 30 November 1936; Mulhouse, Haut-Rhin, France
- Died: 29 November 2024 (aged 87); Paris, France
- Occupations: Historian, anthropologist, academic
- Spouse: Robert Klapisch (div.)
- Children: 1 daughter

Christiane Klapisch-Zuber (30 November 1936 – 29 November 2024) was a French medieval historian, a leading specialist of late medieval and Renaissance Tuscany, and a pioneer in the history of women and gender. Her work combined quantitative history, historical anthropology, and close reading of textual and visual sources. She spent her entire academic career at the École pratique des hautes études (EPHE), which became the École des hautes études en sciences sociales (EHESS) in 1975.

== Early life and education ==
Christiane Zuber was born into a Protestant family of the industrial upper-class in Mulhouse. Her family left Alsace during the Second World War and settled in Chantilly. She was educated at the Lycée Lamartine in Paris before completing preparatory classes at Lycée Janson-de-Sailly. In 1955 Zuber was admitted to the École normale supérieure de Sèvres and obtained her agrégation in history and geography in 1959. During the Algerian War, she supported the FLN, took part in demonstrations, and belonged to activist networks. Zuber was arrested for sheltering an undocumented Algerian militant. Subsequently she was imprisoned at La Petite Roquette in Paris from September 1960 to July 1961 and later amnestied.

== Academic career ==
Klapisch-Zuber joined EPHE in 1962, where she was noticed by Fernand Braudel. Under the supervision of Jacques Le Goff, she defended in 1966 a doctoral thesis on the consumption of art and the use of Carrara marble, published as Les Maîtres du marbre. Carrare 1300–1600 in 1969. Klapisch-Zuber subsequently turned her research toward Florence, collaborating for more than a decade with the American historian David Herlihy on the Florentine cadastre of 1427. Their joint work, Les Toscans et leurs familles (1978), analyzed 60,000 households and became a landmark of quantitative history.

In 1979, Klapisch-Zuber became one of the first women appointed directrice d’études at the EHESS. Her research increasingly focused on kinship, naming practices, ritual, and the everyday lives of women in Florence, drawing extensively on family books (ricordanze). These investigations culminated in major works such as La Maison et le nom (1990), L’Ombre des ancêtres (2000), and Retour à la cité (2006). She later incorporated iconographic sources into her research, notably in Le Voleur de paradis (2015), Mariages à la florentine (2020), and Florence à l’écritoire (2023).

Alongside her research, Klapisch-Zuber played a central role in institutionalizing women's and gender history in France. She contributed to the bulletin Pénélope, edited the medieval volume of Histoire des femmes, directed the Mnémosyne association, and served on the editorial board of the journal Clio. History, Women and Societies.

== Later life and death ==
Klapisch-Zuber received numerous distinctions, including the CNRS Bronze Medal (1979), the Paul O. Kristeller Lifetime Achievement Award (2003), and honorary doctorates from the European University Institute and the University of Pisa. She continued publishing major works until her final years. She died in Paris on 29 November 2024, one day before her 88th birthday.
