= Hurley (CDP), New York =

Hurley, New York
- CDP
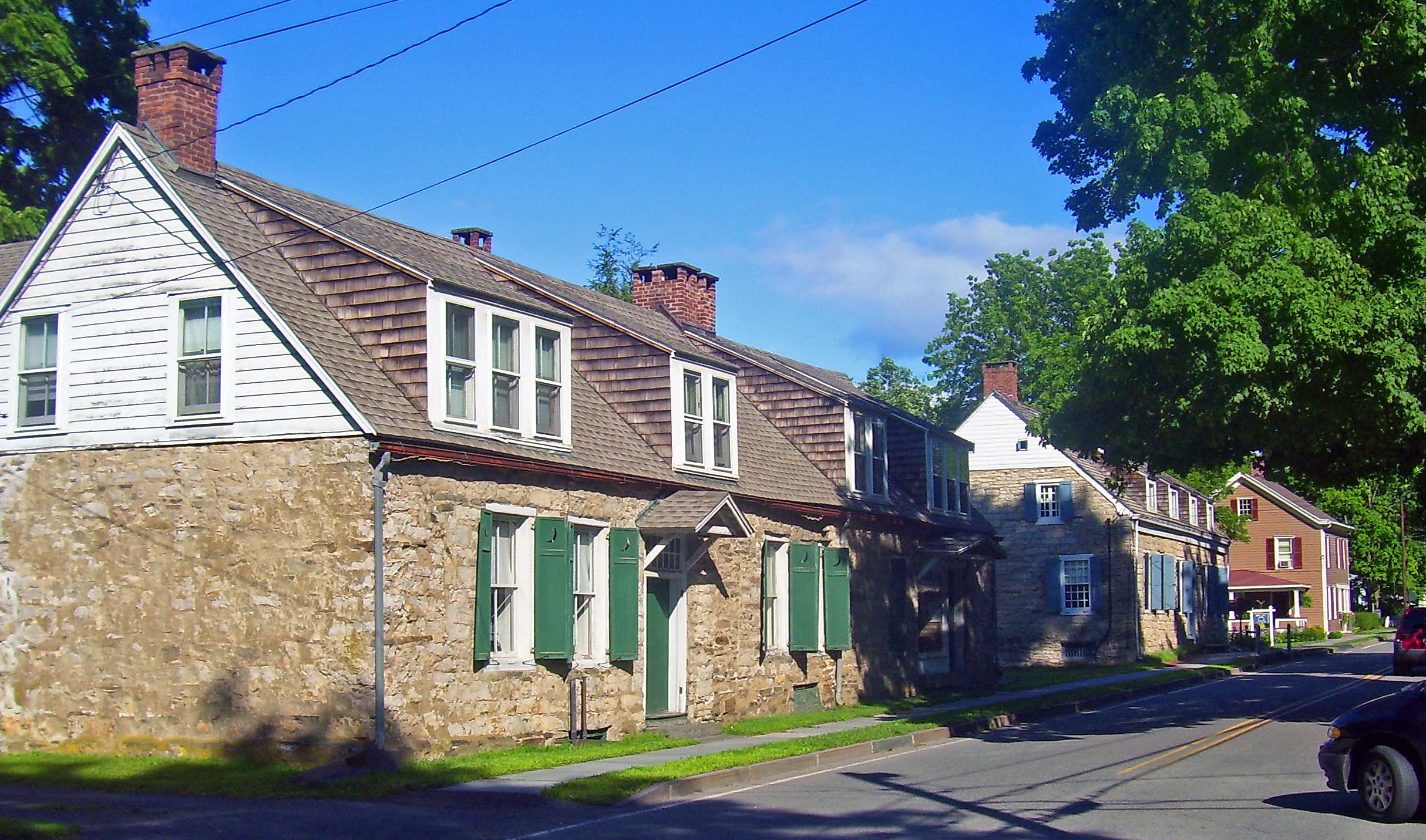
- The historic stone houses of Hurley

- Location in Ulster County and the state of New York.
- Coordinates: 41°55′15″N 74°3′16″W
- Country: United States
- State: New York
- County: Ulster

Area
  - Total: 5.52 sq mi (14.30 km^{2})
  - Land: 5.49 sq mi (14.21 km^{2})
  - Water: 0.031 sq mi (0.08 km^{2})
- Elevation: 200 ft (60 m)

Population (2020)
  - Total: 3,346
  - Density: 609.8/sq mi (235.45/km^{2})
- Time zone: UTC-5 (EST)
  - Summer (DST): UTC-4 (EDT)
- ZIP code: 12443
- Area code: 845
- FIPS code: 36-37132
- GNIS feature ID: 0953520

Hurley is a hamlet (and census-designated place) in the Town of Hurley, Ulster County, New York, United States. The population was 3,346 at the 2020 census.

Hurley is a community near the eastern town line of the Town of Hurley. Much of the hamlet is within the Hurley Historic District, a National Historic Landmark.

== History ==
=== Early days ===
The first people known to have lived in the vicinity of the hamlet of Hurley were Esopus Indians, a northern branch of the Delaware. Dutch and Huguenot settlers moved there from Wiltwyck in the spring of 1662. It was given the Dutch name, Nieu Dorp, (new village). Dissatisfied with their treatment by the Dutch, the Delaware attacked the villages of Hurley and Kingston in June 1663 in what is called the Second Esopus War. The village of eight houses was destroyed and several women and children were taken as captives. It was a year before all the captives were returned to their families. Although the village was soon rebuilt some Huguenot settlers moved from Hurley to found New Paltz.

In September 1664 the Dutch colony of New Netherland Colony was taken over by the English. In 1669, Governor Francis Lovelace renamed some of the Dutch settlements with English names. Nieu Dorp became Horley, (pronounce Hurley) after the Lovelace ancestral home in Horley, England. He also relocated the troublesome English garrison into Marbletown, greatly easing tensions in the area. Nonetheless, Hurley remained a Dutch provincial town in language, customs, and architecture, located along the Old Mine Road, which linked Dutch settlements in the Upper Delaware Valley with Kingston.

=== Revolutionary War ===
During the American Revolutionary War, British led by Generals John Burgoyne and Henry Clinton attempted to split the colonies in two by taking control of the Hudson River Valley. Burgoyne marched south from Canada while Clinton sailed north. On October 16, 1777, a British force under the command of General John Vaughan burned the village of Kingston, which was at that time New York's capital. Many people from Kingston fled to Hurley. With the burning of Kingston, the old stone Roosa - Van Deusen House in neighboring Hurley served for a brief time as the state capital.

British troops were called back to Ponck Hockie to board their ships before they reached Hurley. The grain crop was saved from destruction in part by a four-hour artillery barrage made by the militia of the first Ulster regiment under Colonel Johannes Snyder and Major Adrian Wynkoop, which had delayed the British advance. As the British fleet moved upriver, General George Clinton encamped his troops at the village of Marbletown and moved his command to the Houghtaling House in Hurley in order to better monitor the British. Hurley was an ideal location for a military outpost, with roads providing access to the Kingston, the Strand on Rondout Creek and back roads to Saugerties and Katsbaan.

On October 10, 1777, Lt. Daniel Taylor of Captain Stewart's Company of the 9th Royal Regiment was captured at Little Britain in southern Ulster County, carrying an innocuous note from General Henry Clinton to General John Burgoyne. He was a loyalist junior officer who traveled in civilian clothes on horseback carrying messages between various units of the British Army. As was customary, the note was concealed in a small silver capsule screwed together in the middle. Ordinarily, such messengers from either army were not considered spies of such a nature that their conviction would call for the death sentence. However, Nathan Hale of Connecticut had been captured by the British a year earlier and hanged as a spy. Lieutenant Taylor was tried in New Windsor by a Courts Martial composed largely of Connecticut officers and was condemned to be hanged "at such time and place as the General shall direct."

American troops, trying to reach and defend Kingston from the British, set out from new Windsor and took Taylor with them. They reached Hurley on October 17, where Taylor was held in the Dumond House. On the morning of October 18, Lt. Taylor was moved by horse and wagon to the sweet apple tree on the side of Schoolhouse Lane, where he was hanged.

After leaving Kingston, the British fleet sailed upriver to Saugerties where a raiding party crossed the river and burned the Livingston Estates at Clermont and Belvedere. Upon learning of Burgoyne's surrender at Saratoga, the British force set sail to the south and on the 24th, rejoined the British forces at Fort Clinton. Once the British threat had passed, General Clinton left Hurley and moved his troops south to their original base at Little Britain.

After the Civil War until the early 1900s, the largest industry was bluestone quarrying. In 1871 Hurley contained a Reformed church, two hotels, a store, a school-house, two wagon shops, two blacksmith shops, a shoe shop and about thirty dwellings. A wire suspension bridge, 160 feet long, crossed the creek at this place.

== Hurley Historic District ==
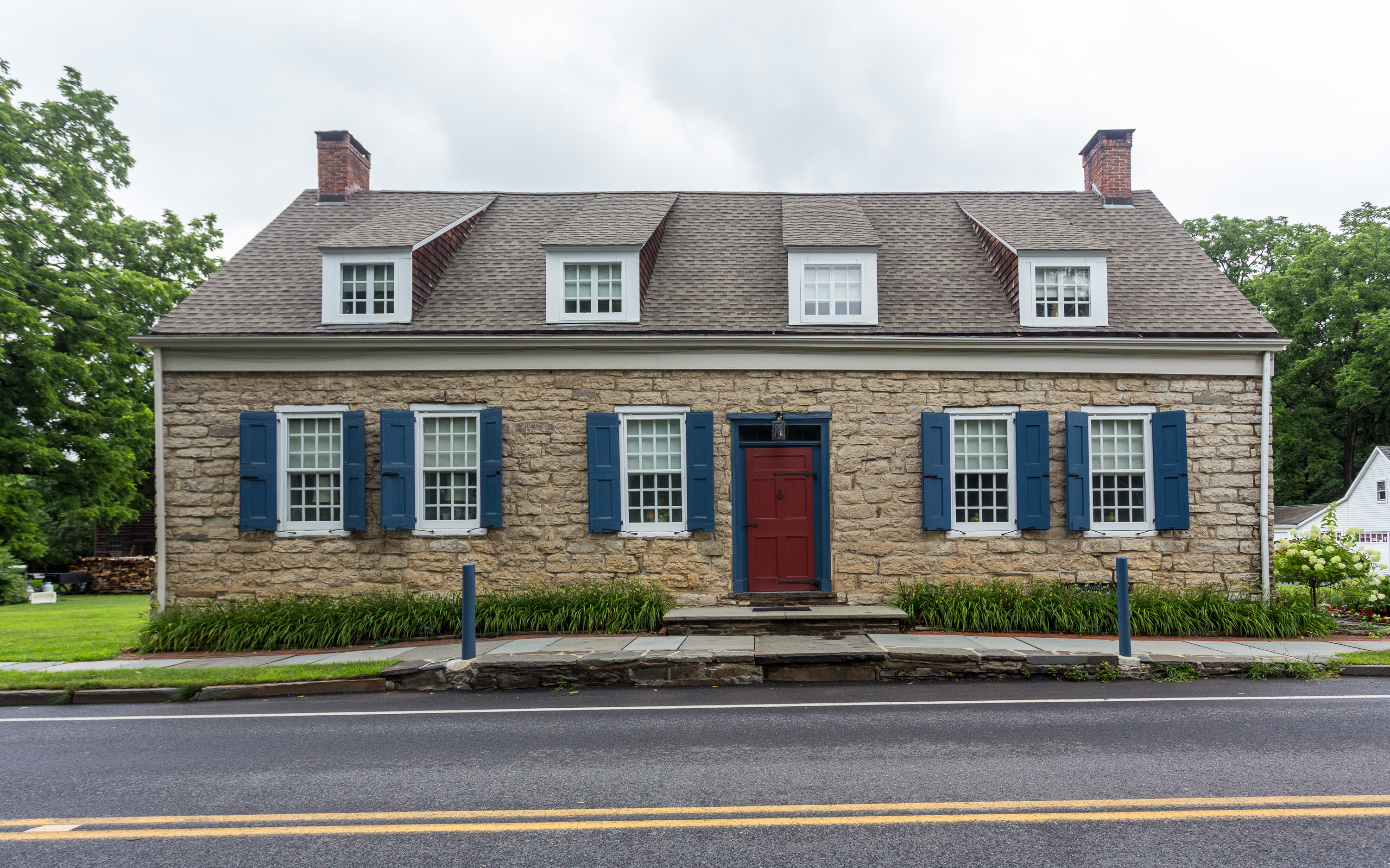
Captain Jan Van Deusen House

Hurley Historic District includes early Hudson Valley Dutch-style stone houses.

- The 1685 Dumond House was used by the Continental Army as a temporary guardhouse.
- Pre-1700s Patentee Manor was built by the Cole family.
- Part of the 1709 Ostrander - Elmendorf House served as the Half Moon tavern during the Revolutionary War.
- The Jonathan Crispell House was built in 1725 by farmer Jonathan Crispell.
- The Polly Crispell House, built in 1735, once held a blacksmith's shop.
- The Jan Van Deusen Jr. House, was built in 1744 by Captain Jan. The parlor served as the meeting room for the NYS Committee of Safety during the Revolutionary War.
- The two-story Ten Eyck House was built in 1786 by Dr. Richard Ten Eyck as a gift for his wife, Jenett Baker.

Once a year, on the second Saturday of July, the Hurley Reformed Church organizes Stone House Day.

== Geography ==
Hurley is located at 41°55′14″N 74°3′16″W (41.920701, -74.054508). It is bisected by US 209.

According to the United States Census Bureau, the CDP has a total area of 5.5 square miles (14.3 km^{2}), of which, 5.5 square miles (14.2 km^{2}) of it is land and 0.04 square miles (0.1 km^{2}) of it (0.54%) is water.

== Demographics ==
Historical population
| Census | Pop. | Note | %± |
|---|---|---|---|
| 2000 | 3,561 | | — |
| 2010 | 3,458 | | −2.9% |
| 2020 | 3,346 | | −3.2% |
U.S. Decennial Census

As of the census of 2000, there were 3,561 people, 1,415 households, and 1,049 families residing in the CDP. The population density was 647.2 inhabitants per square mile (249.9/km^{2}). There were 1,476 housing units at an average density of 268.2 per square mile (103.6/km^{2}). The racial makeup of the CDP was 95.76% White, 1.24% Black or African American, 0.11% Native American, 1.43% Asian, 0.08% Pacific Islander, 0.06% from other races, and 1.32% from two or more races. Hispanic or Latino of any race were 2.13% of the population.

There were 1,415 households, out of which 31.2% had children under the age of 18 living with them, 62.3% were married couples living together, 8.1% had a female householder with no husband present, and 25.8% were non-families. 22.0% of all households were made up of individuals, and 11.5% had someone living alone who was 65 years of age or older. The average household size was 2.51 and the average family size was 2.91.

In the CDP, the population was spread out, with 23.1% under the age of 18, 4.9% from 18 to 24, 25.5% from 25 to 44, 28.2% from 45 to 64, and 18.3% who were 65 years of age or older. The median age was 43 years. For every 100 females, there were 91.2 males. For every 100 females age 18 and over, there were 87.5 males.

The median income for a household in the CDP was $58,624, and the median income for a family was $64,261. Males had a median income of $43,750 versus $28,611 for females. The per capita income for the CDP was $27,458. About 1.8% of families and 2.3% of the population were below the poverty line, including none of those under age 18 and 2.6% of those age 65 or over.

== Education ==
The school district for most of the CDP is Kingston City School District. A small portion is in Rondout Valley Central School District. The comprehensive high school of the Kingston City district is Kingston High School.
