= Irish Mathematical Society =

- Cumann Matamaitice na hÉireann
- Formation: 1976
- President: Dr Rachel Quinlan
- Website: http://www.irishmathsoc.org

The Irish Mathematical Society (Irish: Cumann Matamaitice na hÉireann) or IMS is the main professional organisation for mathematicians in Ireland. The society aims to further mathematics and mathematical research in Ireland. Its membership is international, but it mainly represents mathematicians in universities and other third level institutes in Ireland. It publishes a bulletin, The Bulletin of the Irish Mathematical Society, twice per year and runs an annual conference in September.

The society was founded on 14 April 1976 at a meeting in Trinity College, Dublin when a constitution drafted by D McQuillan, John T. Lewis and Trevor West was accepted. It is a member organization in the European Mathematical Society. Since 2020, it has been the adhering organization for Ireland's membership of the International Mathematical Union. The logo was designed by Irish mathematician Desmond MacHale.

== Bulletin of the Irish Mathematical Society ==
The Bulletin of the Irish Mathematical Society is a journal that has been published since 1986, and was preceded by the Newsletter of the Irish Mathematical Society. It accepts articles that are of interest to both Society members and the wider mathematical community. Articles include original research articles, expository survey articles, biographical and historical articles, classroom notes and book reviews. It also includes a problem page. Articles are available online.

== Officers ==
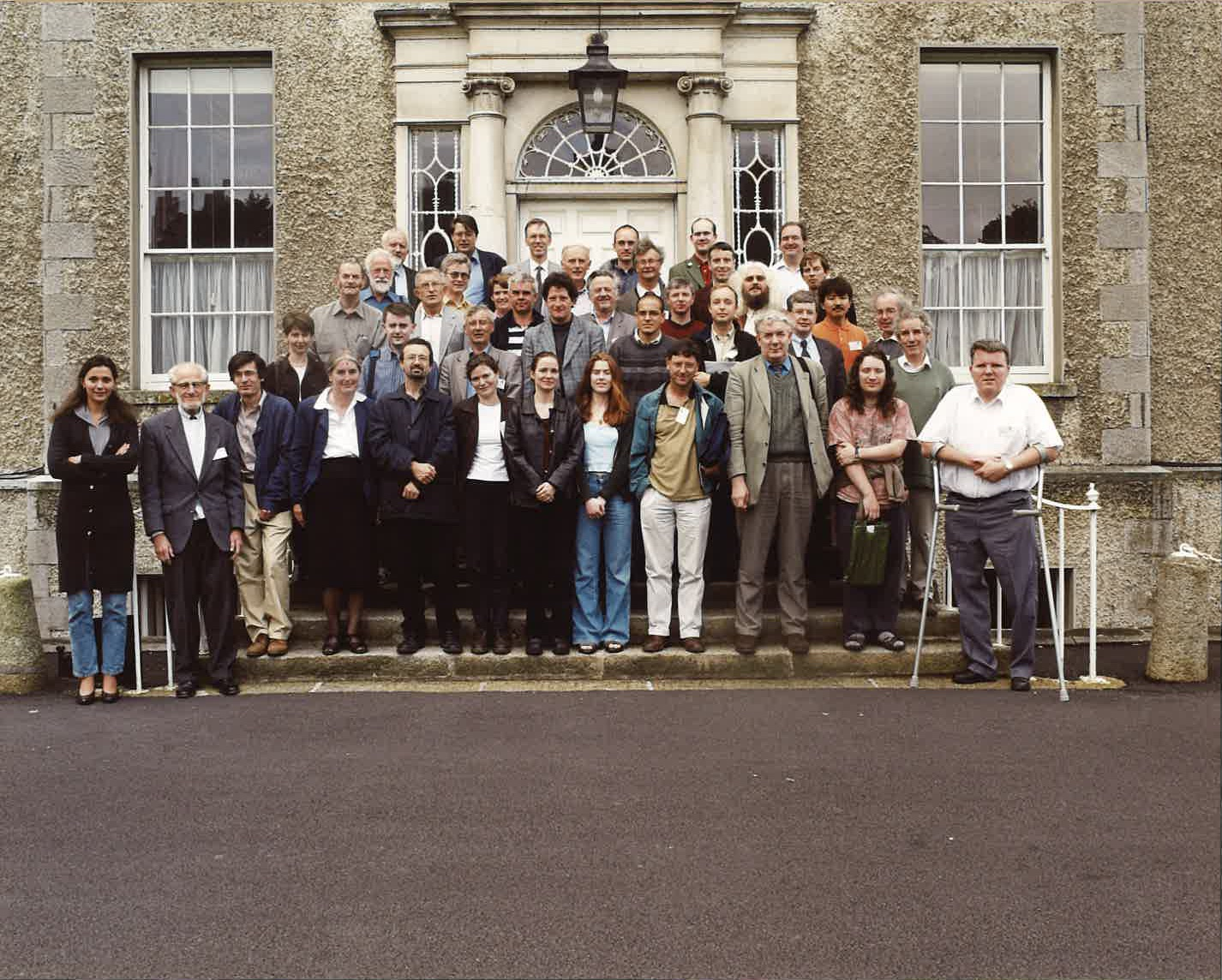
Attendees of the Irish Mathematics Society Meeting in Maynooth University in 2000

Current officers of the society are listed in the bulletin.

| Year | President | Vice President | Secretary | Treasurer | Editor |
|---|---|---|---|---|---|
| 1976 | F. Holland (UCC) | | | | |
| 1977 | F. Holland | M.A. Hayes (UCD) | T. C. Hurley (UCD) | T. T. West (TCD) | |
| 1978 | F. Holland | M.A. Hayes | T. C. Hurley | M.L. Newell (UCG) | T.J. Laffey (UCD) |
| 1979 | T. J. Laffey (UCD) | F. Hodnett (NIHEL) | P.J. Boland (UCD) | M.L. Newell | T.J. Laffey |
| 1980 | T. J. Laffey | F. Hodnett | P.J. Boland | R. Ryan (UCG) | T.J. Laffey |
| 1981 | J.J.H. Miller (TCD) | F. Holland | S. Dineen (UCD) | R. Ryan | T.J. Laffey |
| 1982 | J.J.H. Miller | F. Holland | S. Dineen | R. Ryan | D. Hurley (UCC) |
| 1983 | A.G. O’Farrell (SPC Maynooth) | F. Holland | R. Timoney (TCD) | G.M. Enright (MIC) | D. Hurley |
| 1984 | A.G. O’Farrell | F. Holland | R. Timoney | G.M. Enright | D. Hurley |
| 1985 | M. Newell (UCG) | S. Dineen | A. O'Farrrell | G.M. Enright | D. Hurley, P. Fitzpatrick |
| 1986 | M. Newell | S. Dineen | R. Timoney | G.M. Enright | P. Fitzpatrick (UCC) |
| 1987 | S. Dineen | F. Gaines (UCD) | R. Timoney | G.M. Enright | P. Fitzpatrick, R. Ryan |
| 1988 | S. Dineen | F. Gaines | A. O'Farrrell | G.M. Enright | R. Ryan |
| 1989 | F. Gaines | R. Timoney | A. O'Farrrell | G.M. Enright | R. Ryan |
| 1990 | F. Gaines | R. Timoney | G. Ellis (UCG) | D.A. Tipple (UCD) | R. Ryan |
| 1991 | R. Timoney | B. Goldsmith (Kevin St.) | G. Ellis | D.A. Tipple | J. Ward (UCG) |
| 1992 | R. Timoney | B. Goldsmith | G. Ellis | D.A. Tipple | J. Ward |
| 1993 | B. Goldsmith | D. Hurley | G. Ellis | D.A. Tipple | J. Ward |
| 1994 | B. Goldsmith | D. Hurley | P. Mellon (UCD) | M. Vandyck (RTC/UCC) | R. Gow (UCD) |
| 1995 | D. Hurley | C. Nash (SPC Maynooth) | P. Mellon | J. Pulé (UCD) | R. Gow |
| 1996 | D. Hurley | C. Nash | P. Mellon | J. Pulé | R. Gow |
| 1997 | C. Nash | D. Armitage (QUB) | P. Mellon | J. Pulé | R. Gow |
| 1998 | C. Nash | D. Armitage | R. Higgs | K. Hutchinson (UCD) | R. Gow |
| 1999 | D. Armitage | E. Gath (UL) | R. Higgs | K. Hutchinson | R. Gow |
| 2000 | D. Armitage | E. Gath | R. Higgs | K. Hutchinson | M. Mathieu (QUB) |
| 2001 | E. Gath | G. Lessells (UL) | R. Higgs | K. Hutchinson | M. Mathieu |
| 2002 | E. Gath | G. Lessells | R. Higgs | D. Wraith (NUIM) | M. Mathieu |
| 2003 | G. Lessells | M. O Reilly (SPD) | A. O'Shea (NUIM) | D. Wraith | M. Mathieu |
| 2004 | G. Lessells | M. O Reilly | A. O'Shea | D. Wraith | M. Mathieu |
| 2005 | M. O Reilly | R. Higgs (UCD) | A. O'Shea | D. Wraith | M. Mathieu |
| 2006 | M. O Reilly | R. Higgs | S. O'Rourke (UCC) | S. Breen (SPD) | M. Mathieu |
| 2007 | R. Higgs | J. Cruickshank (NUIG) | S. O'Rourke | S. Breen | M. Mathieu |
| 2008 | R. Higgs | J. Cruickshank | S. O'Rourke | S. Breen | M. Mathieu |
| 2009 | J. Cruickshank | S. Wills (UCC) | S. O'Rourke | S. Breen | M. Mathieu |
| 2010 | J. Cruickshank | S. Wills | S. O'Rourke | S. Breen | M. Mathieu |
| 2011 | S. Wills | M. Mathieu | R. Quinlan (NUI Galway) | S. Breen | A. O Farrell |
| 2012 | S. Wills | M. Mathieu | R. Quinlan | S. Breen | A. O Farrell |
| 2013 | M. Mathieu | M. Mackey (UCD) | R. Quinlan | S. Breen | A. O Farrell |
| 2014 | M. Mathieu | M. Mackey | R. Quinlan | G. Pfeiffer (NUI Galway) | A. O Farrell |
| 2015 | M. Mackey | S. Buckley (MU) | R. Quinlan | G. Pfeiffer | A. O Farrell |
| 2016 | M. Mackey | S. Buckley | D. Malone (MU) | G. Pfeiffer | A. O Farrell |
| 2017 | S. Buckley | P. Mellon (UCD) | D. Malone | G. Pfeiffer | A. O Farrell |
| 2018 | S. Buckley | P. Mellon | D. Malone | G. Pfeiffer | A. O Farrell |
| 2019 | P. Mellon | T. Carroll (UCC) | D. Malone | G. Pfeiffer | A. O Farrell |
| 2020 | P. Mellon | T. Carroll | D. Malone | C. Kelly (UCC) | A. O Farrell |
| 2021 | T. Carroll | L. Creedon | D. Malone | C. Kelly | A. O Farrell |
| 2022 | T. Carroll | L. Creedon | D. Kitson (MIC) | C. Kelly | A. O Farrell |
| 2023 | L. Creedon | R. Quinlan | D. Kitson | C. Kelly | A. O Farrell |
| 2024 | L. Creedon | R. Quinlan | D. Kitson | C. Kelly | A. O Farrell |
| 2025 | R. Quinlan | D. Malone | D. Kitson | C. Kelly | T. Carroll |
