= O'Hurley =

O'Hurley is a surname, and may refer to:

- Dermot O'Hurley (c. 1530–1584), Irish Roman Catholic archbishop of Cashel.
- John O'Hurley (born 1954), American actor, voice actor, and television personality.
- Raymond O'Hurley (1909–1970), Canadian politician.

As an Irish surname, it is associated with Clan Ó Comáin.

== See also ==
- Hurley (disambiguation)
- Hurley (surname)
- O'Herlihy (surname)
