= Hurley, New York =

- Town
- Town of Hurley
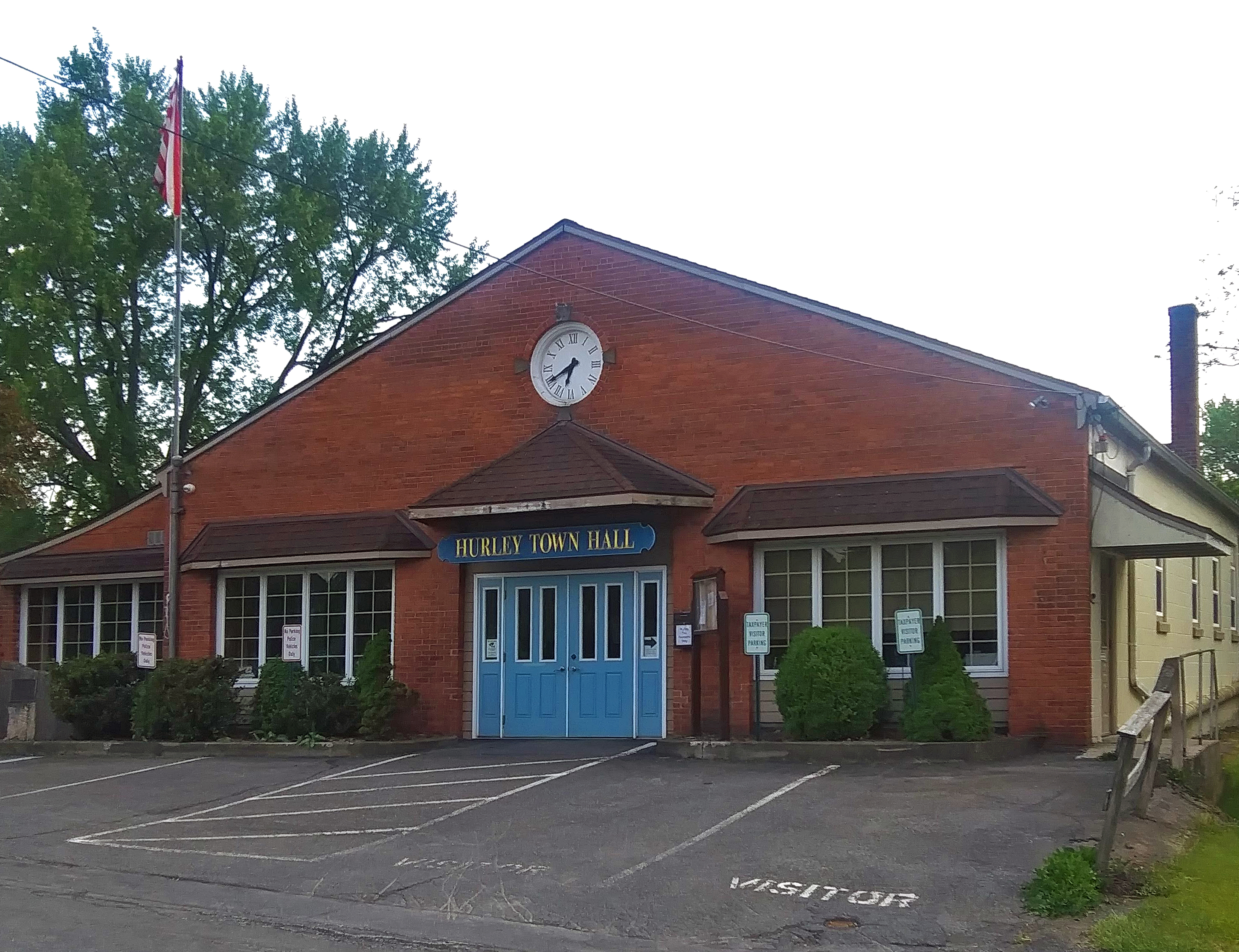
- Hurley Town Hall

- Location in Ulster County and the state of New York.

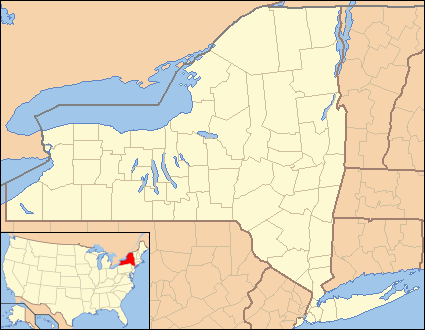
- Location within New York
- Coordinates: 41°55′27″N 74°03′42″W
- Country: United States
- State: New York
- County: Ulster

Area
  - Total: 35.97 sq mi (93.15 km^{2})
  - Land: 29.91 sq mi (77.47 km^{2})
  - Water: 6.05 sq mi (15.68 km^{2}) 16.74%

Population (2020)
  - Total: 6,178
  - Density: 204.9/sq mi (79.12/km^{2})
- Time zone: UTC-5 (Eastern (EST))
  - Summer (DST): UTC-4 (EDT)
- FIPS code: 36-111-37143
- Website: townofhurley.org

Hurley is a town in Ulster County, New York, United States. The population was 6,178 at the 2020 census. The town is in the northeastern part of the county, west of the city of Kingston. Much of the town is inside the Catskill Park. Located within the town is a hamlet and census-designated place, also named Hurley. The Town of Hurley comprises the hamlets of Hurley, West Hurley and Glenford.

== History ==
In the spring of 1662, Petrus Stuyvesant, Director General of New Netherland, established the village of Niew Dorp on the site of a Native American settlement. On June 7, 1663, during the Esopus Wars the Esopus attacked and destroyed that village, and took captives who were later released. The English acquired the Dutch colony on September 6, 1664. On September 17, 1669, the village, abandoned since the Esopus attack, was resettled and renamed Hurley. It has been stated that the resettled village was named after Francis Lovelace, Baron Hurley of Ireland. However, no such title existed and it is more likely that Lovelace renamed the settlement Hurley somehow in reference to, or solidarity with, his kinsmen and fellow royalists, the Barons Lovelace of Hurley in Berkshire, England (contemporaries as well as modern historians often confuse Francis Lovelace the colonial governor with a son of Richard, 1st Baron Lovelace (1564–1634) of Hurley, Berkshire. This earlier Francis was to be the grandfather of the John Lovelace (1672–1709) a later colonial Governor). In 1708 two large land patents from the New York Colonial government expanded the bounds of Hurley northward to near the present boundary with the Town of Woodstock and southward to the old boundary of the Town of New Paltz.

The southern section was quickly settled by farmers and the villages of Bloomingdale and Wagondale (later Creeklocks) were established. The discovery of limestone suitable for cement made this a valuable economic area and the village of Rosendale became its center. These villages and the surrounding area became the core of the town of Rosendale, established in 1844.

The central part of the town (known sometimes as "Old Hurley") remained an agricultural community of close-knit families. Farming the Esopus Valley, they supplied grain to the growing colony, New England, and the American Revolutionary forces. During October, November, and December 1777, Old Hurley was the military headquarters for General George Clinton's Continental forces and the temporary capital of New York State, moving from Kingston. The town was succeeded by Poughkeepsie as the capital.

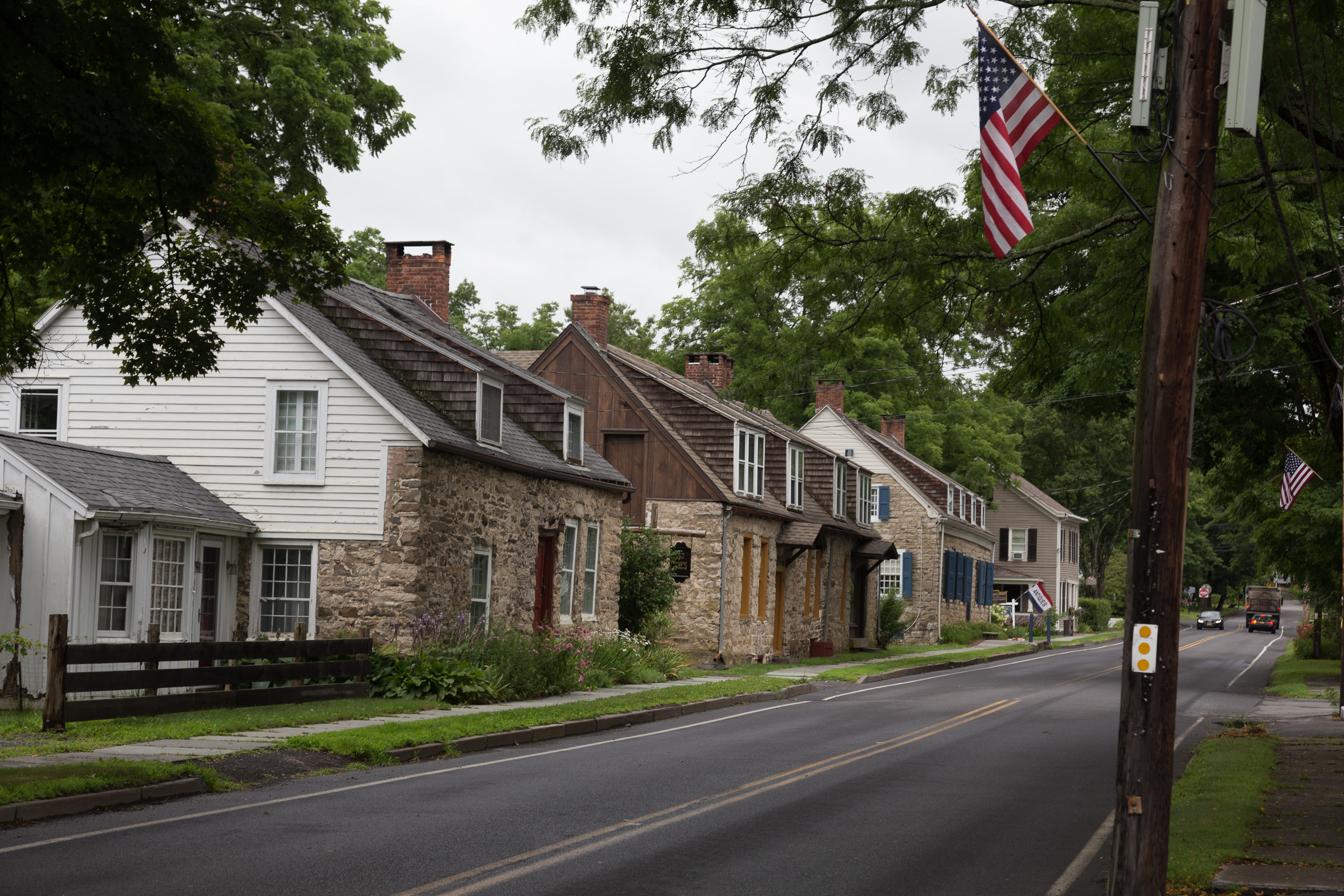
Hurley's Main Street

Old Hurley's Main Street is listed on the National Register of Historic Places due to its well-preserved stone houses which have served as residences for more than 300 years. Some are open to the public once a year in July on Stone House Day, and one contains the Hurley Heritage Society's museum.

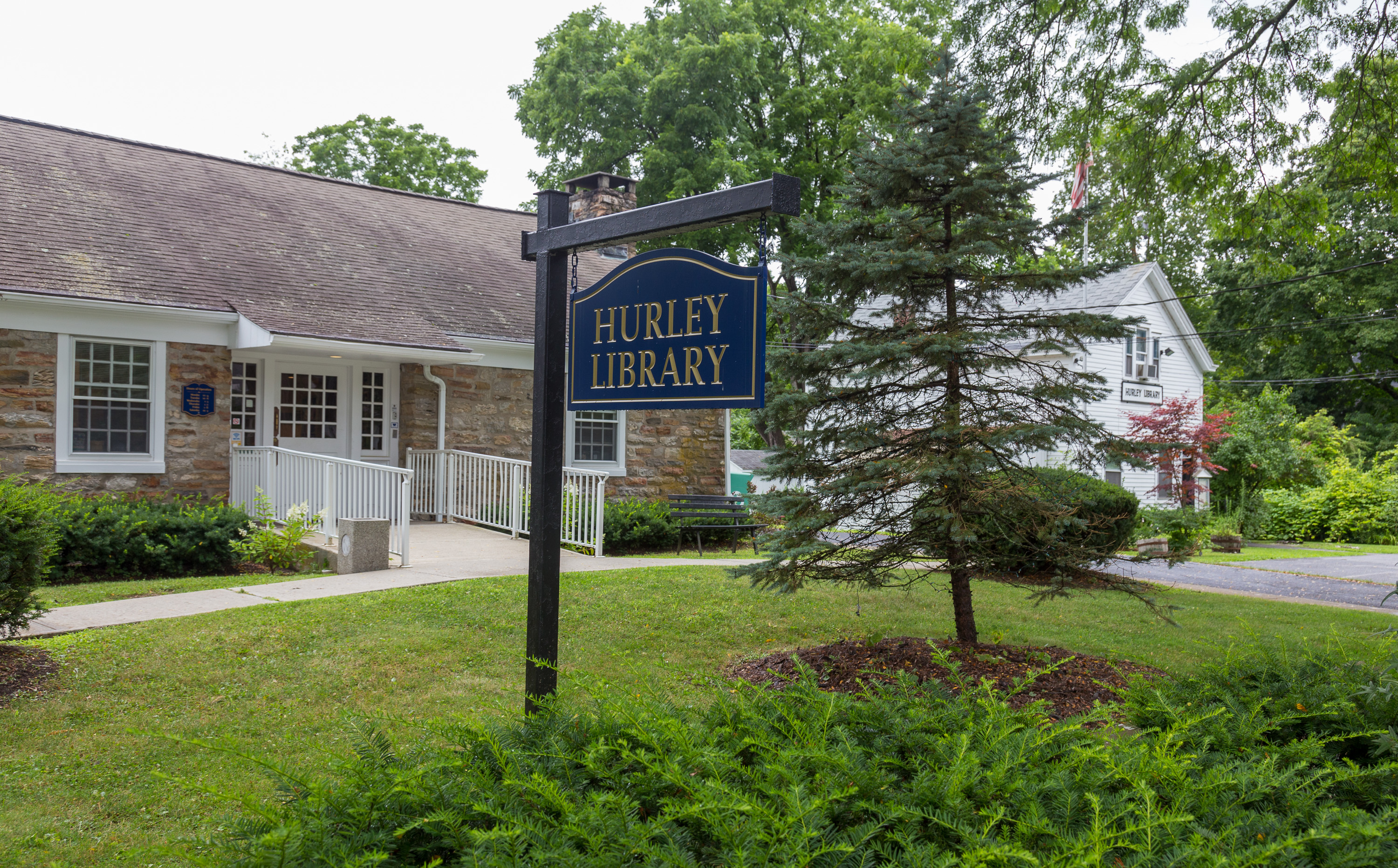
Hurley Library

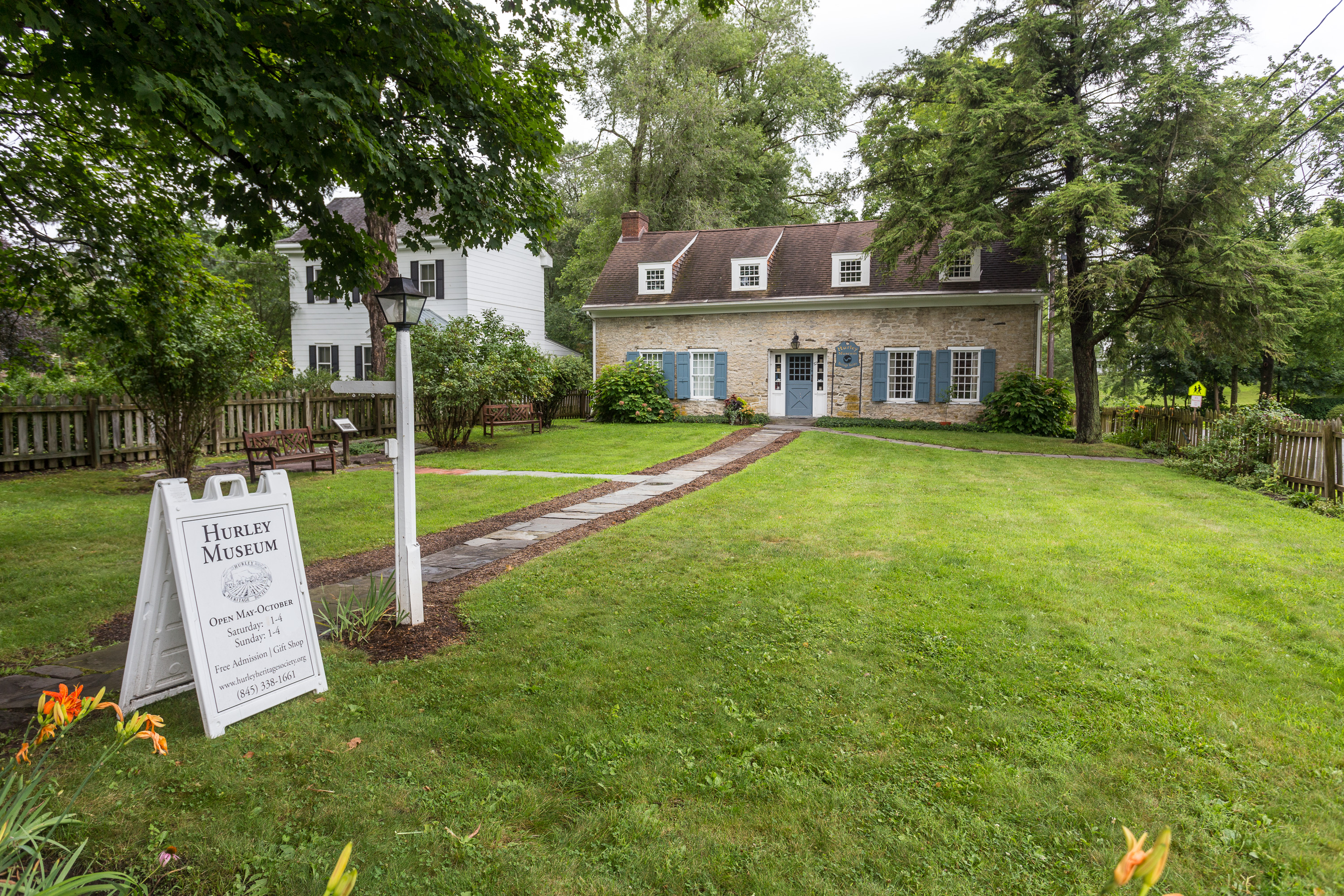
Hurley Museum

The northern section of the town was a forested wilderness until the discovery, in the 1830s, of a fine quality shale. Known as bluestone, it was used in the construction of road curbing, sidewalks and building facades. West Hurley, Glenford, and Ashton were villages established as a result of the quarry industry. In 1917, New York City's need for a dependable water supply resulted in land condemnation and the flooding of the valley to create the Ashokan Reservoir. The flooded villages of Glenford and West Hurley were resettled on the shores of the reservoir, but Ashton was never relocated.

Parts of Hurley have been used to form the towns of New Paltz (1809), Esopus (1818), Olive (1823), Rosendale (1844), and Woodstock (1853). The southern part of Hurley includes Stony Hollow, New York.

== Geography ==
According to the United States Census Bureau, the town has a total area of 36 square miles (93.2 km^{2}), of which 30 square miles (77.6 km^{2}) is land and 6 square miles (15.6 km^{2}) (16.74%) is water.

Esopus Creek, a tributary of the Hudson River, flows through the town. The eastern part of the Ashokan Reservoir is in the northern part of the town.

U.S. Route 209 passes through the eastern part of the town, and NY 28 crosses it east to west.

== Demographics ==
Historical population
Census	Pop.	Note	%±
1790	847		—
1820	1,352		—
1830	1,408		4.1%
1840	2,201		56.3%
1850	2,003		−9.0%
1860	2,364		18.0%
1870	2,987		26.4%
1880	2,521		−15.6%
1890	2,135		−15.3%
1900	1,903		−10.9%
1910	1,734		−8.9%
1920	846		−51.2%
1930	1,168		38.1%
1940	1,530		31.0%
1950	1,980		29.4%
1960	4,526		128.6%
1970	6,496		43.5%
1980	6,992		7.6%
1990	6,741		−3.6%
2000	6,564		−2.6%
2010	6,314		−3.8%
2020	6,178		−2.2%
U.S. Decennial Census

=== 2010 census ===
As of the 2010 census, there were 6,314 people. The population was 94.5% white, 1.6% black, .1% Native American, 1.4% Asian Asian and .1% Pacific Islander. 2.9% were Latino of any race.

=== 2000 census ===
As of the census of 2000, there were 6,564 people, 2,694 households, and 1,872 families residing in the town. The population density was 219.2 inhabitants per square mile (84.6/km^{2}). There were 2,946 housing units at an average density of 98.4 per square mile (38.0/km^{2}). The racial makeup of the town was 95.64% white, 1.4% black or African American, .12% Native American, 1.22% Asian, .11% Pacific Islander, .3% from other races, and 1.2% from two or more races. Hispanic or Latino of any race were 1.9% of the population.

There were 2,694 households, out of which 28.9% had children under the age of 18 living with them, 57.8% were married couples living together, 8.0% had a female householder with no husband present, and 30.5% were non-families. 25.0% of all households were made up of individuals, and 11% had someone living alone who was 65 years of age or older. The average household size was 2.41 and the average family size was 2.88.

In the town, the population was spread out, with 22.3% under the age of 18, 4.6% from 18 to 24, 24.5% from 25 to 44, 31.0% from 45 to 64, and 17.6% who were 65 years of age or older. The median age was 44 years. For every 100 females, there were 95.4 males. For every 100 females age 18 and over, there were 89.2 males.

The median income for a household in the town was $51,055, and the median income for a family was $59,487. Males had a median income of $39,565 versus $27,238 for females. The per capita income for the town was $25,864. About 4.4% of families and 6.2% of the population were below the poverty line, including 7.2% of those under age 18 and 5.3% of those age 65 or over.

== Notable people ==
- Sojourner Truth, abolitionist, feminist, social activist, born into slavery in Hurley in 1797.
- Maurice Hinchey, former US Congressman.
- William C. Hasbrouck, former New York State Assembly Speaker and lawyer, born in Hurley in 1800.
- August Kauss, Medal of Honor recipient in the American Civil War.
- Herb Trimpe, longtime Marvel Comics artist, The Incredible Hulk.
- Jonathan Donahue, founding member of 1990s band Mercury Rev. Was born in Kingston and lived in Hurley until 1977.
- Joe Eula, American fashion illustrator.
- Whitney Hall, player for the Nightmares hockey team.

== Communities and locations in the Town of Hurley ==
- Ashton – a former community, lost by the construction of the Ashokan Reservoir.
- Ashokan Reservoir – a reservoir formed in 1917 within the Catskill Park. It is partly within the northwestern part of the town.
- Hurley – a hamlet in the eastern part of the town. It was temporarily the capital of New York.
- Creeklocks – a location formerly called "Wagondale."
- Glenford – a hamlet on the north shore of the Ashokan Reservoir, on Route 28 west of West Hurley.
- Morgan Hill – a hamlet inside the Catskill State Park, northwest of Hurley hamlet.
- Old Hurley – a location in the central part of the town, which includes the Hurley Historic District.
- Riverside Park – a hamlet south of the hamlet of Hurley.
- Rolling Meadows – a suburban community bordering Kingston.
- Southside – a location in the town.
- West Hurley – A hamlet northwest of Kingston on Route 28.
