= Ernest Denton =

Australian rules footballer

Personal information
- Full name: Ernest Bengrey Denton
- Born: 21 April 1881; Prahran, Victoria
- Died: 26 April 1962 (aged 81); Camberwell, Victoria
- Original team: Brighton

Playing career^{1}
Years	Club	Games (Goals)
1905	Melbourne	1 (0)
- ^{1} Playing statistics correct to the end of 1905.

Ernest Bengrey Denton (21 April 1881 – 26 April 1962) was an Australian rules footballer who played a single game with Melbourne in the Victorian Football League (VFL) in 1905.
