= Patricia Herlihy =

American historian and author

Patricia Herlihy (June 1, 1930 – October 24, 2018) was an American historian and author specializing in Russian and Soviet history.

== Early life ==
When Herlihy was six months old her recently divorced mother moved to China, where they lived for five years. During this time, she learned Chinese, German and some English.

In adolescence, she met her future husband, David Herlihy, and together they lived and studied in Pisa and Florence, and also lived in France for a year. One of their sons is the historian of bicycles, David V. Herlihy.

== Academic career ==
After returning to the United States, Herlihy taught Russian history at the Harvard Extension School. In 1985 Herlihy visited Odessa in Ukraine for three months, which would later be the subject of several books and articles.

After returning to the United States, the Herlihys accepted tenured positions at Brown University, where she continued to work. She also taught at Emmanuel College.

== Works ==
=== Books ===
- Herlihy, Patricia (2002). The Alcoholic Empire: Vodka and Politics in Late Imperial Russia. Oxford University Press. ISBN 0-19-516095-9.
- —— (1987). Odessa: A History, 1794–1914. Cambridge, MA: Harvard University Press. ISBN 0-916458-15-6. ISBN 0-916458-43-1 (1991 paperback reprint).
- —— (2003). Port Jews of Odessa and Trieste: A Tale of Two Cities (Jahrbuch des Simon-Dubnow-Instituts II). München: Deutsche Verlags-Anstalt. ISBN 3-421-05522-X.
- —— (2004). Nicholas V. Iljine (ed.). Odessa Memories. Seattle: University of Washington Press. ISBN 0-295-98345-0.

=== Articles ===
- Herlihy, Patricia (2002). Commerce and Architecture in Odessa in Late Imperial Russia. Baltimore: Johns Hopkins University Press. ISBN 0-8018-6750-9. In the book Commerce in Russian Urban Culture 1861–1914.
- Herlihy, Patricia; Gubar, Oleg. "The Persuasive Power of the Odessa Myth". Ukrainian Research Institute, Harvard University. Archived from the original on December 9, 2008.
