= James Francis Hurley =

English murderer and former fugitive

James Francis Hurley is an English convicted murderer and former fugitive from justice. After escaping from prison in 1994 and eluding prison for 13 years, he was recaptured and imprisoned in The Netherlands, where he served six years before being transferred to a London prison. He was released from prison in January 2025.

== Crime and conviction ==
James Francis Hurley was driving the getaway car in an armed robbery in the town of Hemel Hempstead on 14 April 1988. During the robbery, PC Frank Mason of Hertfordshire Police, who was off-duty at the time and happened upon the security van robbery by chance while out walking, was shot in the back by Hurley. He later died of his injuries at West Hertfordshire Hospital.

Hurley was convicted of PC Mason's murder in 1989, and sentenced to life imprisonment.

== Escape and recapture ==
On 16 February 1994, while being transferred to Wandsworth Prison by bus, Hurley and another prisoner managed to escape. Hurley fled the country and managed to remain at liberty for 13 years.

On 9 November 2007, he was apprehended by Dutch police during a raid on a suspected drug dealer at an address in The Hague, The Netherlands.

He was sentenced to six years' imprisonment in The Netherlands and paroled after four years. In November 2011, officers from the tactical team of Hertfordshire Constabulary extradited Hurley from The Netherlands and returned him to a London prison to serve his life sentence for the murder of PC Mason.

After being recaptured and imprisoned, Hurley attempted to get his murder conviction overturned. On 30 July 2015, his appeal to have his conviction quashed was heard at the Court of Appeal.

== Release ==
Hurley was released from prison in January 2025 on a licence with strict conditions. David Taylor, Labour MP for Hemel Hempstead, wrote to the justice secretary, Shabana Mahmood, asking for a review his release. The Police Federation of England and Wales expressed their dismay at his release.

== Legacy ==
Hertfordshire Police presents the Frank Mason Memorial Award annually in honour of the victim "to an officer who has displayed the qualities of dedication, professionalism and selflessness in protecting the community".
