= David V. Herlihy =

American sports writer

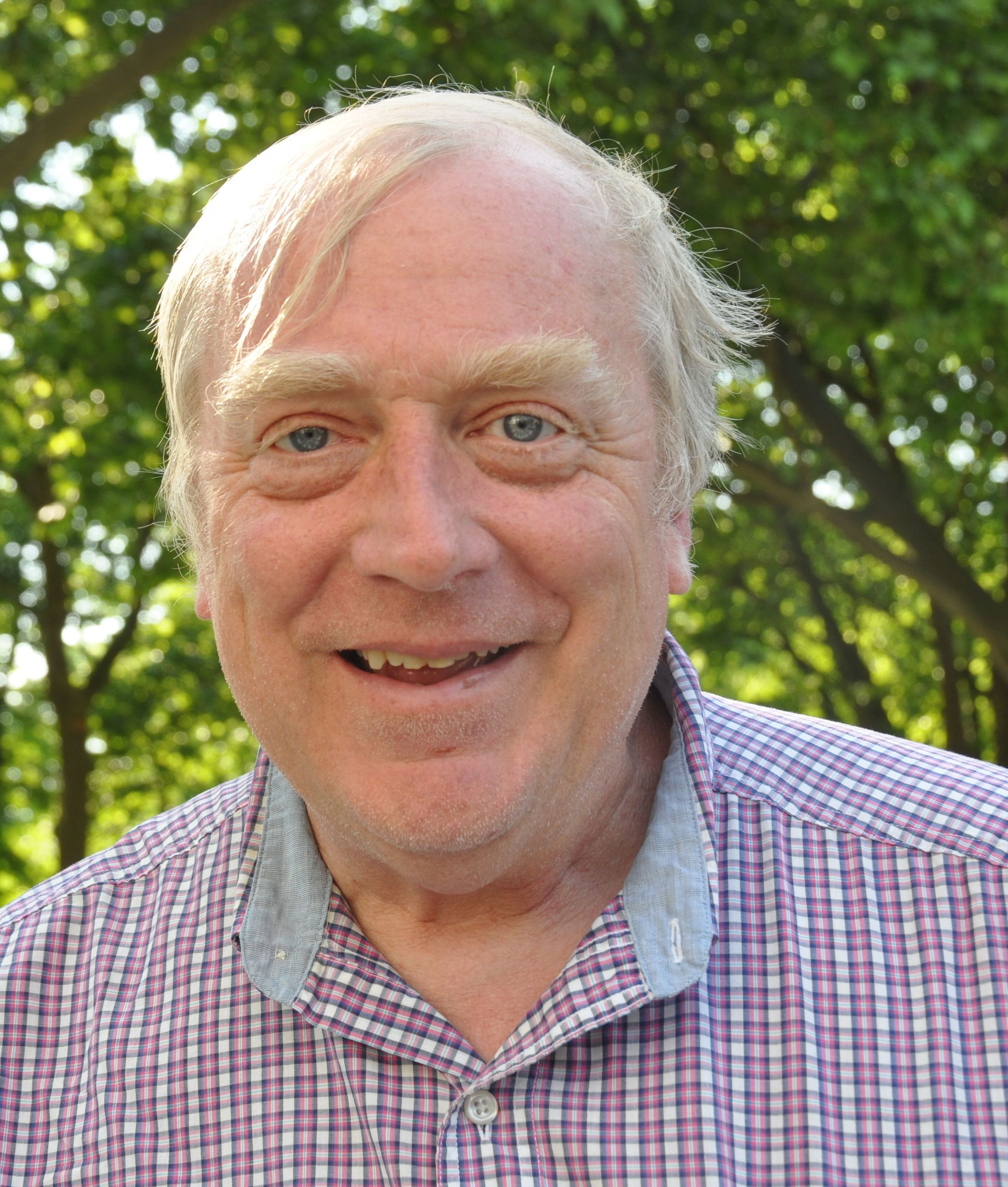
David V. Herlihy (2017)

David V. Herlihy (born July 30, 1958) is an author and historian. He is notable for writing Bicycle: The History, published by Yale University Press, and Lost Cyclist: The Epic Tale of an American Adventurer and His Mysterious Disappearance. He has also presented at the International Cycling History Conference and has published an opinion piece on cycling in The New York Times. He graduated from Harvard University in 1980 and is an alumnus of the Harvard Cycling Club. He is the son of noted historians David Herlihy and Patricia Herlihy.

== Awards ==
- 1999 McNair History Award from the Wheelmen, the preeminent American association of antique bicycle collectors.
- 2004 Award for Excellence in the History of Science sponsored by the Professional and Scholarly Publishing Division of the Association of American Publishers.
- 2005 Sally Hacker Prize sponsored by the Society for the History of Technology.

== Invention of the bicycle ==
Herlihy presented evidence at the fourth International Cycling History Conference in Boston, Massachusetts, Oct. 11–16, 1993, that Pierre Lallement deserves credit for putting pedals on the dandy horse.
