= Sarsfields GAA (Cork) =

Gaelic games club in County Cork, Ireland

Sarsfields
- Na Sáirséalaigh
- Founded: 1896
- County: Cork
- Nickname: Sars
- Colours
- Grounds: Páirc Tadhg Mac Cárthaigh
- Coordinates: 51°55′41.66″N 8°23′15.94″W

Playing kits
Standard colours	Alternative colours

Senior Club Championships
	All Ireland	Munster champions	Cork champions
Hurling:	0	1	8
Camogie:	0	1	3

Sarsfields GAA is a Gaelic Athletic Association club in Glanmire, County Cork, Ireland. The club, a sister club of Glanmire, is solely concerned with the game of hurling.

== History ==
Sarsfields GAA Club was established by a group of men, led by Billy O'Neill, in 1894. Named in honour of the Irish Jacobite and soldier Patrick Sarsfield, 1st Earl of Lucan, the club was first formally registered in 1896. Sarsfields claimed their first county honours in 1937, when the Cork JHC was secured, however, there were also Cork SHC final defeats in 1909, 1936, 1940, 1947 and 1989.

Sarsfields made the SHC breakthrough in 1951 following a 5–08 to 3–07 defeat of Glen Rovers in the final. The club added a second SHC title after a defeat of University College Cork in 1957. A fallow period in terms of success followed for the next 50 years before the club's "golden era". In the eight-year period between 2008 and 2015, Sarsfields contested seven SHC finals, with victories in 2008, 2010, 2012 and 2014.

Sarsfields collected their seventh Cork SHC title after a 0–21 to 0–19 defeat of Midleton in 2023. Days after this victory the club suffered extensive damage to their club grounds and main pitch after Storm Babet. Sarsfields won the Munster Club SHC title after a 3–20 to 2–19 win over Ballygunner in 2024.

== Grounds ==
The club's home ground is Páirc Tadhg Mac Cárthaigh. It was renamed in honour of former player Teddy McCarthy, who was a dual All-Ireland medal-winner in 1990. The official renaming ceremony took place on 5 April 2025.

== Honours ==
=== Hurling ===
- Munster Senior Club Hurling Championship (1): 2024
- Cork Senior Hurling Championship (8): 1951, 1957, 2008, 2010, 2012, 2014, 2023, 2025
- Cork Junior Hurling Championship (1): 1937
- Cork Junior B Inter-Divisional Hurling Championship (1): 2017
- East Cork Junior A Hurling Championship (4): 1937, 1953, 2004, 2016
- Cork Premier Under-21 A Hurling Championship (4): 1975, 2003, 2017, 2019
- Cork Minor Hurling Championship (7): 1931, 1953, 1954, 2007, 2008, 2014, 2025

=== Camogie ===
- Munster Senior Club Camogie Championship (1): 2023
- Cork Senior Camogie Championship (3): 1989, 2019, 2023

== Notable players ==
- Paddy Barry: All-Ireland SHC-winning captain (1952)
- John Considine: All-Ireland SHC-winner (1990)
- Alan Lotty: All-Ireland SHC-winner (1941, 1942, 1943, 1944, 1946)
- Teddy McCarthy: Double All-Ireland SHC-All-Ireland SFC-winner (1990)
- Kieran Murphy: All-Ireland SHC-winner (2004, 2005)
- Tadhg Murphy: All-Ireland SHC-winner (1977)
- Pat Ryan: All-Ireland SHC-winner (1999)
