= Richmond upon Thames London Borough Council elections =

Class of UK elections

A map showing the wards of Richmond upon Thames since 2022

Richmond upon Thames London Borough Council elections are held every four years for all 54 councillor seats in the 18 wards that make up the Borough Council. By-elections are held in individual wards when vacancies arise outside the four-year cycle.

== Results summary ==
The first election to the council was held in 1964, initially operating as a shadow authority before the new system came into full effect in 1965. Political control of the council since 1964 has been held by the following parties:

Election	Overall control	Conservative	Lib Dem	Labour	Green	Ind.
1964	Conservative	41	–	12	–	1
1968	Conservative	54	–	–	–	–
1971	Conservative	36	3	15	–	–
1974	Conservative	36	10	8	–	–
1978	Conservative	34	18	–	–	–
1982	No overall control	26	26	–	–	–
1986	Alliance	3	49	–	–	–
1990	Liberal Democrats	4	48	–	–	–
1994	Liberal Democrats	7	43	2	–	–
1998	Liberal Democrats	14	34	4	–	–
2002	Conservative	39	15	–	–	–
2006	Liberal Democrats	18	35	–	–	1
2010	Conservative	30	24	–	–	–
2014	Conservative	39	15	–	–	–
2018	Liberal Democrats	11	39	–	4	–
2022	Liberal Democrats	1	48	–	5	–
2026	Liberal Democrats	–	54	–	–	–

== Council elections ==
- 1964 Richmond upon Thames London Borough Council election
- 1968 Richmond upon Thames London Borough Council election (boundary changes took place but the number of seats remained the same)
- 1971 Richmond upon Thames London Borough Council election (boundary changes took place but the number of seats remained the same) (Note: The Greater London and Surrey Order 1970)
- 1974 Richmond upon Thames London Borough Council election
- 1978 Richmond upon Thames London Borough Council election (boundary changes reduced the number of seats by two)
- 1982 Richmond upon Thames London Borough Council election
- 1986 Richmond upon Thames London Borough Council election
- 1990 Richmond upon Thames London Borough Council election
- 1994 Richmond upon Thames London Borough Council election (boundary changes took place but the number of seats remained the same) (Note: The Greater London and Surrey (County and London Borough Boundaries) (No. 2) Order 1993) (Note: The Greater London and Surrey (County and London Borough Boundaries) (No. 4) Order 1993)
- 1998 Richmond upon Thames London Borough Council election (boundary changes took place but the number of seats remained the same) (Note: The Greater London and Surrey (County and London Borough Boundaries) Order 1994)
- 2002 Richmond upon Thames London Borough Council election (boundary changes increased the number of seats by two)
- 2006 Richmond upon Thames London Borough Council election
- 2010 Richmond upon Thames London Borough Council election
- 2014 Richmond upon Thames London Borough Council election
- 2018 Richmond upon Thames London Borough Council election
- 2022 Richmond upon Thames London Borough Council election (boundary changes took place but the number of seats remained the same)
- 2026 Richmond upon Thames London Borough Council election

== Borough result maps ==
2002 results map

2006 results map

2010 results map

2014 results map

2018 results map

2022 results map

2026 results map

== By-election results ==
=== 1964–1968 ===
There were no by-elections.

=== 1968–1971 ===
East Sheen by-election, 20 June 1968
Party	Candidate	Votes	%	±%
Conservative	P. J. Maitland	1199		
Independent	M. V. Smith	618		
Labour	A. G. H. Lawrance (Note: Alfred George Henry Lawrance JP, who had been, from 1964 to 1965, the last Mayor of Barnes before its absorption into the newly created London Borough of Richmond upon Thames, represented Mortlake Ward until the 1968 election when he and all his Labour colleagues lost their seats. Harrison, Martin (13 October 2014). "The Last Mayor of Barnes". Martin Harrison's Medal Research Site.)	151		
Turnout			31.7%	

Hampton by-election, 20 June 1968
Party	Candidate	Votes	%	±%
Conservative	J. K. Baker	1160		
Liberal	A. D. Reddrop	615		
Labour	J. M. Hyam	262		
Turnout			24.2%	

Richmond Hill by-election, 20 June 1968
Party	Candidate	Votes	%	±%
Conservative	H. M. Abell	603		
Liberal	S. Rundle	569		
Independent	A. P. Warren	248		
Labour	A. B. Hart	207		
Turnout			26.7%	

Kew by-election, 6 February 1969
Party	Candidate	Votes	%	±%
Liberal	S. Rundle	1676		
Conservative	J. M. Hooper	1079		
Labour	D. J. Kidger	323		
Turnout			35.7%	

Hampton Wick by-election, 29 May 1969
Party	Candidate	Votes	%	±%
Conservative	G. M. Cooper	1766		
Liberal	R. D. McArthur	605		
Labour	J. R. F. Brown	405		
Turnout			37.4%	

South Twickenham by-election, 25 September 1969
Party	Candidate	Votes	%	±%
Conservative	T. A. Bligh	1266		
Labour	P. T. Z. Goldring	391		
Liberal	D. O. Collins	374		
Turnout			28.6%	

Hampton Hill by-election, 2 October 1969
Party	Candidate	Votes	%	±%
Conservative	P. G. Lockyer	1065		
Labour	K. L. Elmes	502		
Liberal	J. E. Twaits	361		
Turnout			25.3%	

East Twickenham by-election, 19 March 1970
Party	Candidate	Votes	%	±%
Conservative	J. M. Russell	1190		
Liberal	R. W. Marlow	435		
Labour	E. C. Eldridge	424		
Turnout			28.9%	

Hampton Hill by-election, 19 March 1970
Party	Candidate	Votes	%	±%
Conservative	T. J. Attwood	1081		
Labour	K. L. Elmes	525		
Liberal	J. E. Twaits	377		
Turnout			24.5%	

=== 1971–1974 ===
Hampton Hill by-election, 3 February 1972
Party	Candidate	Votes	%	±%
Labour	G. E. F. Samuels	1,530		
Conservative	P. G. Lockyer	1,196		
Liberal	J. E. Twaits	160		
Turnout			35.5%	

Central Twickenham by-election, 25 May 1972
Party	Candidate	Votes	%	±%
Labour	M. J. Powell	1,232		
Conservative	R. K. Morland	1,087		
Liberal	R. W. Marlow	390		
Turnout			41.6%	

East Twickenham by-election, 14 September 1972
Party	Candidate	Votes	%	±%
Labour	J. M. Pardington	1,109		
Conservative	M. C. Gregory	1,012		
Liberal	S. J. Nunn	244		
Ind. Conservative	A. Woodward	185		
Turnout			37.3%	

Richmond Town by-election, 25 January 1973
Party	Candidate	Votes	%	±%
Liberal	J. Waller	1,301		
Conservative	J. L. Saunders	937		
Labour	Bob Marshall-Andrews	928		
Turnout			48.1 %	

=== 1974–1978 ===
Palewell by-election, 1 May 1975
Party	Candidate	Votes	%	±%
Liberal	Anthony Manners	1,769		
Conservative	Margery Segar	1,253		
Labour	John Sheppard	519		
Turnout			51.5	

Richmond Town by-election, 1 May 1975
Party	Candidate	Votes	%	±%
Liberal	Bryan Lewis	1,651		
Conservative	John Saunders	1,100		
Labour	Roy Piper	421		
Ratepayers	Joshua Kielty	253		
Turnout			54.4	

Barnes by-election, 20 May 1976
Party	Candidate	Votes	%	±%
Liberal	David Cornwell	1,722		
Conservative	Patrick Marshall	1,718		
Labour	Joy Mostyn	577		
Turnout			56.3	

Following the discovery of a series of voting errors, the High Court on 5 August 1976 declared the Liberal candidate in place of the Conservative. The revised votes are recorded here.

Ham-Petersham by-election, 15 July 1976
Party	Candidate	Votes	%	±%
Liberal	Marie Biddulph	1,716		
Labour	Roger Smith	1,182		
Conservative	Vera Goodman	810		
Turnout			57.3	

Teddington by-election, 16 December 1976
Party	Candidate	Votes	%	±%
Conservative	Peter Temlett	1,637		
Liberal	Sidney Marshall	1,229		
Labour	John Shelton	558		
National Front	Terence Denville-Faulkner	57		
Turnout			50.8	

Mortlake by-election, 24 March 1977
Party	Candidate	Votes	%	±%
Liberal	Deirdre Martineau	1,668		
Conservative	Christopher Sandy	826		
Labour	Joy Mostyn	734		
Turnout			57.6	

=== 1990–1994 ===
Central Twickenham by-election, 29 October 1992
Party	Candidate	Votes	%	±%
Liberal Democrats	John Coombs	896	40.1	
Conservative	Jennie Edwards	786	35.2	
Labour	Michael Gold	457	20.5	
Green	Rowland Morgan	54	2.4	
National Front	Jeremy Bedford-Turner	40	1.8	
Turnout			43.1	
Liberal Democrats gain from Conservative		Swing		

The by-election was called following the resignation of Cllr Anthony Johnson.

Hampton by-election, 22 April 1993
Party	Candidate	Votes	%	±%
Liberal Democrats	Robert Parslow	1,430	46.4	
Conservative	Anne Woodward	1,236	40.1	
Labour	Martin Cross	413	13.4	
Turnout			48.2	
Liberal Democrats hold		Swing		

The by-election was called following the death of Cllr Gavin Alexander.

=== 1994–1998 ===
Teddington by-election, 29 February 1996
Party	Candidate	Votes	%	±%
Liberal Democrats	Joanna Frith	1,377		
Conservative	Peter Temlett	990		
Labour	Christopher Boaler	686		
Turnout				
Liberal Democrats hold		Swing		

The by-election was called following the resignation of Cllr Elaine Pippard.

Central Twickenham by-election, 30 May 1996
Party	Candidate	Votes	%	±%
Liberal Democrats	John Coombs	972	36.0	
Conservative	Mary Rae	908	33.7	
Labour	Graham Nixon	818	30.3	
Majority		64	2.3	
Turnout		2,698	49.5	
Liberal Democrats gain from Conservative		Swing		

The by-election was called following the resignation of Cllr Philip Northey.

Mortlake by-election, 6 February 1997
Party	Candidate	Votes	%	±%
Liberal Democrats	Eleanor Stanier	908	42.9	
Conservative	Malcolm McAlister	615	29.0	
Labour	Michelle Thew	594	28.1	
Majority		293	13.9	
Turnout		2,120	35.2	
Liberal Democrats hold		Swing		

The by-election was called following the resignation of Cllr Susan Fenwick.

Hampton Hill by-election, 12 June 1997
Party	Candidate	Votes	%	±%
Conservative	Geoffrey Samuel	1,138	40.3	−0.1
Liberal Democrats	John Gossage	1,096	38.8	−3.0
Labour	Stephen Cox	591	20.9	+3.1
Majority		42	1.5	
Turnout		2,825	42.1	
Conservative gain from Liberal Democrats		Swing		

The by-election was called following the resignation of Cllr David Martin.

=== 1998–2002 ===
Palewell by-election, 10 June 1999
Party	Candidate	Votes	%	±%
Conservative	Nicola Urquhart	1,496	49.1	+7.5
Liberal Democrats	Julian Rudd	1,215	39.9	−6.3
Labour	Maureen Metzger	333	10.9	−1.3
Majority		281	9.2	
Turnout		3,044	48.3	
Conservative hold		Swing		

The by-election was called following the resignation of Cllr Helen Blake.

=== 2002–2006 ===
Mortlake & Barnes Common by-election, 7 August 2003
Party	Candidate	Votes	%	±%
Liberal Democrats	Eleanor Stanier	936	44.5	+14.0
Conservative	Jane West	927	44.1	+4.2
Labour	Benjamin Rowland	132	6.3	−23.3
Green	James Page	109	5.2	+5.2
Majority		9	0.4	
Turnout		2,104	30.3	
Liberal Democrats gain from Conservative		Swing		

The by-election was called following the death of Cllr John Saunders.

Kew by-election, 18 December 2003
Party	Candidate	Votes	%	±%
Liberal Democrats	Jane Arneil	1,722	54.7	+11.3
Conservative	Ewan Wallace	1,235	39.3	−5.8
Green	Sylvia Levi	104	3.3	+3.3
Labour	Simon Fowler	85	2.7	−8.9
Majority		487	15.4	
Turnout		3,146	46.6	
Liberal Democrats hold		Swing		

The by-election was called following the death of Cllr Anthony Barnett.

Hampton by-election, 7 October 2004
Party	Candidate	Votes	%	±%
Liberal Democrats	Suzette Nicholson	1,669	57.9	+18.3
Conservative	Stuart Leamy	1,111	38.6	−10.4
Labour	Kanbar Hosseinbor	101	3.5	−8.0
Majority		558	19.3	
Turnout		2,881	42.0	
Liberal Democrats gain from Conservative		Swing		

The by-election was called following the death of Cllr Jean Matthews.

North Richmond by-election, 27 January 2005
Party	Candidate	Votes	%	±%
Liberal Democrats	Celia Hodges	1,384	51.9	+14.9
Conservative	Paul Hodgins	1,043	39.1	−4.7
Labour	Barnaby Marder	129	4.8	−5.6
Green	Sylvia Wills	110	4.1	+4.1
Majority		341	12.8	
Turnout		2,666	39.6	
Liberal Democrats gain from Conservative		Swing		

The by-election was called following the resignation of Cllr Marc Cranfield-Adams.

Twickenham Riverside by-election, 5 May 2005
Party	Candidate	Votes	%	±%
Liberal Democrats	David Trigg	2,111	45.8	+5.3
Conservative	Nicholas Lait	1,513	32.8	−9.4
Labour	John Grant	548	11.9	−5.4
Green	Henry Gower	435	9.4	+9.4
Majority		598	13.0	
Turnout		4,607		
Liberal Democrats gain from Conservative		Swing		

The by-election was called following the death of Cllr Derek Beattie.

=== 2006–2010 ===
Barnes by-election, 6 December 2007
Party	Candidate	Votes	%	±%
Conservative	Rita Palmer	1,643	56.2	+3.8
Liberal Democrats	Barbara Westmorland	1,103	37.7	−5.8
Labour	Ann Neimer	91	3.1	−1.0
Green	James Page	87	3.0	+3.0
Majority		540	18.5	
Turnout		2,924	41.2	
Conservative hold		Swing		

The by-election was called following the resignation of Cllr Benedict Stanberry.

=== 2010–2014 ===
North Richmond by-election, 3 May 2012
Party	Candidate	Votes	%	±%
Conservative	Stephen Speak	1,733	42.4	
Liberal Democrats	Jane Dodds	1,587	38.9	
Labour	Brian Caton	364	8.9	
Green	James Page	206	5.0	
Independent	Marc Cranfield-Adams	123	3.0	
Turnout		4,084	52.4	
Conservative hold		Swing		

The by-election was called following the resignation of Cllr Richard Montague.

=== 2014–2018 ===
Hampton Wick by-election 2 July 2015
Party	Candidate	Votes	%	±%
Liberal Democrats	Geraldine Locke	1,189	43.0	+25.0
Conservative	Jon Hollis	1,081	39.1	−10.6
Green	Anthony Breslin	237	8.6	−9.9
Labour	Paul Tanto	185	6.7	−7.2
UKIP	Sam Naz	69	2.5	N/A
Independent	Michael Lloyd	7	0.3	N/A
Majority		108	3.9	
Turnout		2,769	34.89	
Liberal Democrats gain from Conservative		Swing		

The by-election was called following the resignation of Cllr Tania Mathias, of the Conservative Party, following her election as the Member of Parliament for Twickenham.

=== 2018–2022 ===
East Sheen by-election 18 July 2019
Party	Candidate	Votes	%	±%
Liberal Democrats	Julia Cambridge	1,809	55.9	
Conservative	Helen Edward	1,090	35.5	
Women's Equality	Trixie Rawlinson	90	2.8	
Labour	Giles Oakley	82	2.7	
Turnout		3,071	40.7	
Liberal Democrats hold		Swing		

The by-election was called following the death of Cllr Mona Adams.

Hampton Wick by-election 6 May 2021
Party	Candidate	Votes	%	±%
Liberal Democrats	Petra Fleming	2,447	52.4	▲11.5
Conservative	Nina Watson	1,232	26.4	▼0.9
Green	Chas Warlow	538	11.5	▼15.5
Labour	Nick Dexter	446	9.5	▲3.1
Majority		1,215	26.0	N/A
Turnout		4,663	56.7	▲4.5
Liberal Democrats gain from Green		Swing	N/A	

The by-election was called following the resignation of Cllr Dylan Baxendale.

=== 2022–2026 ===
Hampton North by-election 18 January 2024
Party	Candidate	Votes	%	±%
Liberal Democrats	Carey Bishop	1,177	53.2	
Conservative	Nupur Majumdar	771	34.8	
Labour	Sam Cullen	159	7.2	
Green	Danielle Coleman	106	4.8	
Turnout		2,213	30.9	
Liberal Democrats gain from Conservative		Swing	N/A	

The by-election was called following the death of Cllr Geoffrey Samuel.

Teddington by-election 18 January 2024
Party	Candidate	Votes	%	±%
Liberal Democrats	Richard Baker	1,716	64.3	
Conservative	Elizabeth Foster	561	21.0	
Green	Chantal Kerr-Sheppard	184	6.9	
Labour	James Thomson	163	6.1	
Independent	Dominic Stockford	46	1.7	
Turnout		2,670	33.8	
Liberal Democrats hold		Swing	N/A	

The by-election was called following the death of Cllr Martin Elengorn.
