= 1978 Richmond upon Thames London Borough Council election =

The 1978 Richmond upon Thames Council election took place on 4 May 1978 to elect members of Richmond upon Thames London Borough Council in London, England. The whole council was up for election and the Conservative party stayed in overall control of the council.

== Election result ==
Party	Votes		Seats		
Conservative Party	31,635 (45.99%)	▲5.08	34 (65.4%)	34 / 52	▼2
Liberal Party	25,906 (37.66%)	▲6.45	18 (34.6%)	18 / 52	▲8
Labour Party	11,109 (16.15%)	▼10.97	0 (0.0%)	0 / 52	▼8
National Front	134 (0.19%)	N/A	0 (0.0%)	0 / 52	N/A

↓
18	34
Liberal	Conservative

== Ward results ==
Barnes (3)
Party	Candidate	Votes	%	±%
Conservative	June R M Robinson	2453	53.4	+9.7
Conservative	Ian Dalziel	2393		−
Conservative	Popham J.	2235		−
Liberal	David C Cornwell	1690	36.8	+11.1
Liberal	Hamish Farquharson Cardno	1517		−
Liberal	Fergus O'Kelly	1512		−
Labour	Blundy P.	451	9.8	−11.0
Labour	Hoskins A. Ms.	433		−
Labour	Seager G.	432		−
Turnout			64.2	+14.6

Central Twickenham (2)
Party	Candidate	Votes	%	±%
Conservative	Cox J.	1517	51.6	n/a
Conservative	Robert Arthur James Alcock	1500		−
Liberal	David Hugill	774	26.3	n/a
Liberal	John W G Coombs	772		−
Labour	Anderson P.	650	22.1	n/a
Labour	Cable J.	548		−
Turnout			56.6	n/a

East Sheen (2)
Party	Candidate	Votes	%	±%
Conservative	Green S.	1619	59.9	n/a
Conservative	Sidney Grose	1545		−
Liberal	Philip L Cook	938	34.7	n/a
Liberal	Maria Tooley	900		−
Labour	Lamb B. MS.	145	5.4	n/a
Labour	Parry S.	134		−
Turnout			58.9	n/a

East Twickenham (3)
Party	Candidate	Votes	%	±%
Liberal	John P M Rowlands	1950	46.5	+22.4
Liberal	Sydney J Nunn	1933		−
Liberal	Ruth E Lewis	1860		−
Conservative	Leaney A.	1722	41.0	−2.6
Conservative	Harry Hall	1653		−
Conservative	Redwood P. Ms.	1598		−
Labour	Millward A. Ms.	526	12.5	−19.9
Labour	Shelton J.	490		−
Labour	Eldridge E.	442		−
Turnout			59.2	+8.9

Ham & Petersham (3)
Party	Candidate	Votes	%	±%
Liberal	David Reeve Williams	1717	44.5	+6.1
Liberal	Lawrence W Oliver	1491		−
Liberal	Maureen A Allen	1439		−
Conservative	Bushell J.	1203	31.2	+6.3
Conservative	Poyser P. Ms.	1149		−
Conservative	Jabelman S. Ms.	1113		−
Labour	Bayliss B.	939	24.3	−12.4
Labour	Heitzmann A.	801		−
Labour	Rudge K.	753		−
Turnout			61.8	+5.1

Hampton (3)
Party	Candidate	Votes	%	±%
Conservative	George Kenton	2132	56.0	+1.3
Conservative	James L Hargreaves	2029		−
Conservative	Franklin R.	1921		−
Liberal	Maureen Joan Mary Woodriff	1191	31.3	+3.7
Liberal	John M G Ison	1066		−
Liberal	Edward V H Paget	1033		−
Labour	Lalis M.	487	12.8	−4.9
Labour	Lunberg P. Ms.	479		−
Labour	Day D. Ms.	456		−
Turnout			57.5	+5.3

Hampton Hill (3)
Party	Candidate	Votes	%	±%
Conservative	Champion H. Ms.	1854	47.2	+8.1
Conservative	Harris D.	1835		−
Conservative	Warhurst E.	1683		−
Liberal	Conway R G D Carmody	1038	26.4	+4.2
Labour	Elmes K.	1035	26.4	−12.3
Labour	Samuels G.	1028		−
Liberal	Torquil Stephen Stewart	1025		−
Liberal	Moya Meredith Smith	1000		−
Labour	Connor G. Ms.	982		−
Turnout			57.6	+7.3

Hampton Nursery (2)
Party	Candidate	Votes	%	±%
Conservative	Heath B. Ms.	758	49.2	n/a
Conservative	Smith D.	701		−
Liberal	Janet Chandler	488	31.7	n/a
Liberal	Rodney P Hopkins	480		−
Labour	Holman N.	294	19.1	n/a
Labour	Gourney P.	270		−
Turnout			57.7	n/a

Hampton Wick (3)
Party	Candidate	Votes	%	±%
Conservative	Cooper G.	2076	63.0	+11.2
Conservative	Marlow D.	2058		−
Conservative	Anthony Francis Arbour	2045		−
Labour	Browning D.	638	19.4	−8.1
Labour	Nieper R. Ms.	616		−
Liberal	Brendan W F Joyce	579	17.6	−3.0
Liberal	Keith B Dabbs	574		−
Labour	Firth B.	565		−
Liberal	John W Parton	535		−
Turnout			46.4	+3.5

Heathfield (3)
Party	Candidate	Votes	%	±%
Conservative	Woodward A. Ms.	1962	46.3	+6.7
Conservative	Lee P.	1959		−
Conservative	Baker J.	1869		−
Liberal	Gareth Harper	1351	31.9	+9.0
Liberal	Jinx G L N Dacombe	1347		−
Liberal	Michael L Jones	1318		−
Labour	Sewell C.	923	21.8	−15.6
Labour	Goody P.	866		−
Labour	Glass H.	847		−
Turnout			58.4	+5.2

Kew (3)
Party	Candidate	Votes	%	±%
Conservative	Gordon-Smith G.	2232	46.5	+15.6
Conservative	Shaddock C.	2150		−
Conservative	Mozley A.	2145		−
Liberal	Jennifer Louise Tonge	2037	42.4	−7.7
Liberal	David G Blomfield	1963		−
Liberal	Leslie Worth	1961		−
Labour	Lourie A.	536	11.2	−4.6
Labour	Elder T.	518		−
Labour	Love A.	510		−
Turnout			64.1	+8.1

Mortlake (3)
Party	Candidate	Votes	%	±%
Liberal	Deirdre Bourke Martineau	2054	54.0	+49.1
Liberal	Edward Timothy Razzall	1921		−
Liberal	Derek V Wainwright	1870		−
Conservative	Stevens G.	927	24.4	+3.6
Conservative	Pollecoff E. Ms.	876		−
Labour	Hart A.	823	21.6	−15.9
Labour	Masters E.	788		−
Conservative	Gedrych B.	752		−
Labour	Mostyn J. Ms.	745		−
Turnout			60.4	+7.5

Palewell (3)
Party	Candidate	Votes	%	±%
Liberal	Anthony L Manners	1939	46.1	+12.8
Conservative	Morell K.	1880	44.7	−2.3
Liberal	Sally Rachel Hamwee	1821		−
Conservative	Barrow N.	1799		−
Conservative	Popat S. Ms.	1771		−
Liberal	Anthony Alan Tallents	1767		−
Labour	Hunt A. Ms.	390	9.3	−10.3
Labour	Lamb H.	383		−
Labour	Sheppard M. Ms.	356		−
Turnout			64.1	+19.7

Richmond Hill (3)
Party	Candidate	Votes	%	±%
Liberal	Rachel M Dickson	1700	47.6	+6.5
Liberal	Jane L M Thomas	1631		−
Liberal	Anthony I Simmonds	1616		−
Conservative	Ormiston J.	1563	43.8	−0.9
Conservative	Martin P.	1497		−
Conservative	Lescher R.	1477		−
Labour	Radley D.	309	8.7	−5.6
Labour	Robert Graham Marshall-Andrews	294		−
Labour	Durrant S.	283		−
Turnout			55.2	+10.6

Richmond Town (2)
Party	Candidate	Votes	%	±%
Liberal	Alison M Cornish	1639	52.5	n/a
Liberal	Bryan T B Lewis	1477		−
Conservative	Saunders J.	1180	37.8	n/a
Conservative	Wheeler S.	1073		−
Labour	Roberts J. Ms.	305	9.8	n/a
Labour	Bourne C. Ms.	284		−
Turnout			64.9	n/a

South Twickenham (3)
Party	Candidate	Votes	%	±%
Conservative	Tom A Bligh	1660	47.6	−3.3
Conservative	Hollebone R.	1592		−
Conservative	Nora J Ford Millar	1556		−
Liberal	Geoffrey Robert Pope	1368	39.2	+9.3
Liberal	Derek W Hague	1302		−
Liberal	Garry R G Milne	1302		−
Labour	Tait A.	460	13.2	−16.7
Labour	Thompson M. Ms.	460		−
Labour	Thompson P.	448		−
Turnout			50.2	+4.7

Teddington (3)
Party	Candidate	Votes	%	±%
Conservative	Temlett P.	2116	52.6	+6.9
Conservative	Edwards S. Ms.	1940		−
Conservative	Whittaker R.	1927		−
Liberal	Patrick J Tarrant	976	24.3	+6.7
Liberal	John E Twaits	973		−
Liberal	Margaret B Fowler	938		−
Labour	Gilligan K.	927	23.1	−13.7
Labour	Barry R.	836		−
Labour	Siantonas G.	809		−
Turnout			54.5	+6.1

West Twickenham (2)
Party	Candidate	Votes	%	±%
Liberal	John Waller	1409	47.3	n/a
Liberal	Dion Anthony Scherer	1265		−
Conservative	Elkington A.	885	29.7	n/a
Conservative	Thomson C.	853		−
Labour	Kareh R.	687	23.0	n/a
Labour	Cordingley D.	629		−
Turnout			60.8	n/a

Whitton (3)
Party	Candidate	Votes	%	±%
Conservative	John F Lambeth	1896	51.5	+11.4
Conservative	Newstead L.	1818		−
Conservative	Warhurst S. Ms.	1733		−
Liberal	Wilfred P Letch	1068	29.0	−6.9
Liberal	Keith Mackinney	1065		−
Liberal	Cyril J Barnes	1029		−
Labour	Potter C. Ms.	584	15.9	−8.1
Labour	Eustace E.	557		−
Labour	Macpherson D.	545		−
National Front	Denville-Faulkner T.	134	3.6	n/a
National Front	Ware D.	127		−
National Front	Sawyer J.	118		−
Turnout			55.6	+2.3
