= 1982 Richmond upon Thames London Borough Council election =

The 1982 Richmond upon Thames Council election took place on 6 May 1982 to elect members of Richmond upon Thames London Borough Council in London, England. The whole council was up for election and went into no overall control.

== Results ==
Party	Votes		Seats		
SDP-Liberal Alliance	31,829 (44.91%)	▲7.25	26 (50.0%)	26 / 52	▲8
Conservative Party	30,338 (42.81%)	▼3.18	26 (50.0%)	26 / 52	▼8
Labour Party	6,765 (9.55%)	▼6.60	0 (0.0%)	0 / 52	0
Independent	1,104 (1.56%)	N/A	0 (0.0%)	0 / 52	N/A
Ecology Party	738 (1.04%)	N/A	0 (0.0%)	0 / 52	N/A
National Front	61 (0.09%)	▼0.11	0 (0.0%)	0 / 52	0
Communist Party	34 (0.05%)	N/A	0 (0.0%)	0 / 52	N/A

↓
26	26
SDP-Liberal Alliance	Conservative

=== By ward ===
Members of the old council*

Barnes (3)
Party	Candidate	Votes	%	±%
Conservative	June R M Robinson*	2177	50.5	−2.9
Conservative	John A Popham*	2017		−
Conservative	Peter J Martin	1979		−
Liberal	John T P Roberts	1725	40.0	+3.2
SDP	Clifford D Tippett	1611		−
SDP	Henry T Reed	1582		−
Labour	Christopher M Hull	413	9.6	−0.2
Labour	Reginald Williams	411		−
Labour	Peter P Cheevers	379		−
Turnout			61.9	−2.3

Central Twickenham (2)
Party	Candidate	Votes	%	±%
Conservative	Walter J Kelly	1543	52.5	+0.9
Conservative	Mary Rae	1467		−
Liberal	Cyril J Barnes	973	33.1	+6.8
SDP	Christopher S Browne	949		−
Labour	John C Gallop	338	11.5	−10.6
Labour	Peta L Lunberg	281		−
Ecology	Helen M D Thompson	49	1.7	n/a
Communist	Christopher G Payne	34	1.2	n/a
Turnout			55.4	−1.2

East Sheen (2)
Party	Candidate	Votes	%	±%
Conservative	Sidney Grose*	1588	55.5	−4.4
Conservative	Brian Semmens	1578		−
Liberal	Roderick J Pearson	1139	39.8	+5.1
SDP	Allan F Lazarus	1062		−
Labour	Phillip Lamb	136	4.8	−0.6
Labour	Iain J McIntosh	131		−
Turnout			63.0	+4.1

East Twickenham (3)
Party	Candidate	Votes	%	±%
Liberal	John P M Rowlands*	1922	49.8	+3.3
Liberal	David C Cornwell	1860		−
Liberal	Sydney J Nunn*	1809		−
Conservative	Michael J W Higgins	1396	36.2	−4.8
Conservative	Clive Thomson	1356		−
Conservative	Audrey M Cotton	1347		−
Labour	Feola E Choat	397	10.3	−2.2
Labour	John Bowling	374		−
Labour	Angela Hickey	358		−
Ecology	John M Rhys	141	3.7	n/a
Turnout			56.4	−2.8

Ham & Petersham (3)
Party	Candidate	Votes	%	±%
Liberal	David Reeve Williams*	2275	62.6	+18.1
Liberal	Raymond M Hart	2260		−
Liberal	Maureen A Allen*	2216		−
Conservative	Paul J Johnston	1064	29.3	−1.9
Conservative	Denis Muldoon	1014		−
Conservative	Michael C Normington	1011		−
Labour	John K Glynn	298	8.2	−16.1
Labour	Jenifer M Wyatt	253		−
Labour	Albert E Heitzmann	238		−
Turnout			61.1	−0.7

Hampton (3)
Party	Candidate	Votes	%	±%
Conservative	George Kenton*	2059	51.1	−4.9
Conservative	James L Hargreaves*	1993		−
Conservative	Graham B H Norris	1878		−
Liberal	Maureen Joan Mary Woodriff	1713	42.5	+11.2
Liberal	John M G Ison	1677		−
SDP	John Vincent Cable	1496		−
Labour	Geoffrey A Francis	261	6.5	−6.3
Labour	Percy S Gourgey	242		−
Labour	Paul Bialkowski	216		−
Turnout			59.9	+2.4

Hampton Hill (3)
Party	Candidate	Votes	%	±%
Conservative	Holly A M Champion*	1997	50.2	+3.0
Conservative	Peter G Lockyer	1903		−
Conservative	Philip J Circus	1841		−
Liberal	Michael G Butlin	1359	34.2	+7.8
Liberal	Mary Patricia Tordoff	1304		−
SDP	Gwynfil M Connor	1290		−
Labour	George E F Samuels	620	15.6	−10.8
Labour	Stephen J Cox	563		−
Labour	Brian P Boreham	524		−
Turnout			57.8	+0.2

Hampton Nursery (2)
Party	Candidate	Votes	%	±%
Conservative	Bertha J Heath*	939	46.8	−2.4
Liberal	Rodney P Hopkins	839	41.8	+10.1
Conservative	Joan Keogan	838		−
Liberal	Michael I Chandler	815		−
Labour	Anthony D J McEvoy	227	11.3	−7.8
Labour	Peter M Jones	222		−
Turnout			62.1	+4.4

Hampton Wick (3)
Party	Candidate	Votes	%	±%
Conservative	David J Marlow*	2015	54.3	−8.7
Conservative	Hugh R Colthorpe	1990		−
Conservative	Anthony Francis Arbour*	1984		−
Liberal	Philip L Cook	1181	31.8	+14.2
SDP	Walter Freeman	1172		−
Liberal	John W Parton	1082		−
Labour	Timothy R Hanlon	374	10.1	−9.3
Labour	Pamela J Risner	361		−
Labour	Derek J A Tutchell	360		−
Ecology	John Stone	142	3.8	n/a
Turnout			52.7	+6.3

Heathfield (3)
Party	Candidate	Votes	%	±%
Conservative	Anne Woodward*	2109	48.6	+2.3
Conservative	Ramon Gillum	2062		−
Conservative	Thomas H Wright	2024		−
Liberal	Wilfred P Letch	1802	41.5	+9.6
Liberal	Francis Mayes	1706		−
SDP	John A Friel	1626		−
Labour	Patricia M Hunt	428	9.9	−11.9
Labour	Graham R Nixon	401		−
Labour	Mansel J Lalis	390		−
Turnout			57.4	−1.0

Kew (3)
Party	Candidate	Votes	%	±%
Liberal	Jennifer Louise Tonge	2377	43.6	+1.2
Liberal	David G Blomfield	2305		−
SDP	Alexander S Lourie	1779		−
Conservative	Richard G J Ottaway	1687	30.9	−15.6
Conservative	Richard M Cantor	1546		−
Conservative	John N Upton	1465		−
Independent	Crispin Shaddock	761	13.9	n/a
Labour	Alison R Leftwich	415	7.6	−3.6
Labour	Kenneth E Rudge	400		−
Labour	Stephen D Spencer	364		−
Ecology	Toni E Macarthur	218	4.0	n/a
Turnout			63.3	−0.8

Mortlake (3)
Party	Candidate	Votes	%	±%
Liberal	Deirdre Bourke Martineau*	2135	62.1	+8.1
Liberal	Edward Timothy Razzall*	2080		−
Liberal	Derek V Wainwright*	2067		−
Conservative	George M Haywards	948	27.6	+3.2
Conservative	Monica O Port	908		−
Conservative	James R Neale	897		−
Labour	Jean M Hill	355	10.3	−11.3
Labour	Andrew E Love	322		−
Labour	Alexander T Braid	302		−
Turnout			55.1	−5.3

Palewell (3)
Party	Candidate	Votes	%	±%
Liberal	Sally Rachel Hamwee*	1935	47.4	+1.3
Conservative	Keith I Morell*	1856	45.4	+0.7
Liberal	Anthony L Manners*	1833		−
Conservative	John L Saunders	1785		−
Conservative	Patricia A Steel	1776		−
Liberal	Marcia M L Donaldson	1706		−
Labour	Christopher C Floyd	295	7.6	−1.7
Labour	Margaret H Jones	279		−
Labour	Peter J Mapleston	256		−
Turnout			64.7	+0.6

Richmond Hill (3)
Party	Candidate	Votes	%	±%
Liberal	Rachel M Dickson*	1831	52.6	+5.0
Liberal	Anthony I Simmonds*	1733		−
Liberal	Christine G Grist	1718		−
Conservative	John Ormiston	1460	41.9	−1.9
Conservative	Christopher N P Lewis	1412		−
Conservative	Courteney G Harris	1359		−
Labour	John B Whitty	190	5.5	−3.2
Labour	Joseph M Bailey	294		−
Labour	Arnold R Barfield	187		−
Turnout			58.5	+3.3

Richmond Town (2)
Party	Candidate	Votes	%	±%
Liberal	Alison M Cornish*	1583	53.2	+0.7
Liberal	Timothy B Lewis*	1454		−
Conservative	Pramila Le Hunte	1036	34.8	−3.0
Conservative	Ian F Watts	1002		−
Labour	Timothy J Summers	303	10.2	+0.4
Labour	Sydney F Sutters	265		−
Ecology	David Monks	54	1.8	n/a
Turnout			66.2	+1.3

South Twickenham (3)
Party	Candidate	Votes	%	±%
Liberal	Geoffrey Robert Pope	1864	42.0	+2.8
Conservative	Norah J Ford Millar*	1795	40.4	−7.2
Conservative	Gordon G Bates	1794		−
Conservative	Stuart N Leamy	1757		−
Liberal	Dion Anthony Scherer	1670		−
SDP	Terence R Wells	1563		−
Labour	Duncan M Macpherson	438	9.9	−3.3
Labour	Brian S Gee	409		−
Labour	Christopher W Mays	400		−
Independent	Raymond Hollebone	343	7.7	n/a
Turnout			58.0	+7.8

Teddington (3)
Party	Candidate	Votes	%	±%
Liberal	Martin D Elengorn	2024	43.8	+19.5
SDP	Alexander G Cox	1932		−
Liberal	Eugene R O'Connor	1923		−
Conservative	Peter J Temlett*	1906	41.3	−11.3
Conservative	Anthony D M Allen	1755		−
Conservative	Raymond E Waddington-Jones	1754		−
Labour	Hamish A Glass	553	12.0	−11.1
Labour	Kathleen M Waters	469		−
Labour	Robert H Saunders	465		−
Ecology	Mary T G Walwyn	134	2.9	n/a
Turnout			62.2	+7.7

West Twickenham (2)
Party	Candidate	Votes	%	±%
Liberal	John Waller*	1425	51.5	+4.2
Liberal	Arthur P N Herbert	1208		−
Conservative	Thomas H Miller	901	32.6	+2.9
Conservative	Nicholas J S Wood-Dow	840		−
Labour	Rashid Kareh	439	15.9	−7.1
Labour	Kevin A Gilligan	412		−
Turnout			57.1	−3.7

Whitton (3)
Party	Candidate	Votes	%	±%
Conservative	Kenneth J Riley	1862	47.3	−4.2
Conservative	Susan Warhurst*	1842		−
Conservative	Harry Hall	1780		−
Liberal	Keith MacKinney	1727	43.9	+14.9
Liberal	Robert J A Smith	1582		−
SDP	Vivienne H Clifford-Winters	1340		−
Labour	Howard Davies	285	7.2	−8.7
Labour	Pauline A Wilkins	283		−
Labour	Sally Paggetti	256		−
National Front	Terence Denville-Faulkner	61	1.6	−2.0
National Front	Reginald Harrison	52		−
National Front	James Sawyer	46		−
Turnout			59.3	+3.7
