= 1986 Richmond upon Thames London Borough Council election =

1986 local election in England

An election was held on 8 May 1986 to elect members of Richmond upon Thames London Borough Council in London, England. The whole council was up for election and the SDP–Liberal Alliance gained overall control of the council.

== Election result ==
Party	Votes		Seats		
SDP-Liberal Alliance	36,743 (52.12%)	▲7.21	49 (94.2%)	49 / 52	▲23
Conservative Party	24,260 (34.41%)	▼8.40	3 (5.8%)	3 / 52	▼23
Labour Party	8,603 (12.20%)	▲2.66	0 (0.0%)	0 / 52	0
Green Party	532 (0.75%)	▼0.29	0 (0.0%)	0 / 52	0
Independent	361 (0.51%)	▼1.05	0 (0.0%)	0 / 52	0

↓
49	3
SDP-Liberal Alliance	Conservative

== Ward results ==
Barnes (3)
Party	Candidate	Votes	%	±%
Alliance	Lang H. Ms.	1980	46.5	+6.5
Alliance	Gent C. Ms.	1950		−
Conservative	Robinson J. Ms.	1910	44.9	−5.6
Conservative	Baden-Powell K. Ms.	1816		−
Alliance	Mollett A.	1805		−
Conservative	Martin P.	1761		−
Labour	Smith L. Ms.	367	8.6	−1.0
Labour	Williams R.	359		−
Labour	Nollen V.	357		−
Turnout			62.9	+1.0

Central Twickenham (2)
Party	Candidate	Votes	%	±%
Alliance	Beltran A. Ms.	1259	42.1	+9.0
Alliance	Brand M.	1230		−
Conservative	Kelly W.	1156	38.6	−13.9
Conservative	Rae M. Ms.	1123		−
Labour	Gallop C. Ms.	578	19.3	+7.8
Labour	Miller S.	543		−
Turnout			58.4	+3.0

East Sheen (2)
Party	Candidate	Votes	%	±%
Conservative	Grose S.	1347	47.1	−8.4
Conservative	True N.	1330		−
Alliance	Reed H.	1317	46.0	+6.2
Alliance	Walters M. Ms.	1298		−
Labour	Dunne W.	197	6.9	+2.1
Labour	Pugsley E.	165		−
Turnout			61.2	−1.8

East Twickenham (3)
Party	Candidate	Votes	%	±%
Alliance	Rowlands J.	2177	55.4	+5.6
Alliance	Nunn S.	2134		−
Alliance	Cornwell D.	2096		−
Conservative	Normington M.	1161	29.5	−6.7
Conservative	Higgins M.	1136		−
Conservative	Lewis C.	1108		−
Labour	Gold M.	593	15.1	+4.8
Labour Co-op	Lightfoot F.	563		−
Labour	Murphy B.	562		−
Turnout			58.3	+1.9

Ham & Petersham (3)
Party	Candidate	Votes	%	±%
Alliance	Williams D.	2385	64.3	+1.7
Alliance	Hart R.	2348		−
Alliance	Jones S. Ms.	2293		−
Conservative	Kerr J.	945	25.5	−3.8
Conservative	Sparrow D.	930		−
Conservative	Doggett C.	919		−
Labour	Wyatt J. Ms.	379	10.2	+2.0
Labour	Royle P.	359		−
Labour	Gourgey P.	351		−
Turnout			61.9	+0.8

Hampton (3)
Party	Candidate	Votes	%	±%
Alliance	Woodriff B.	1975	51.7	+0.6
Alliance	Doocey E. Ms.	1890		−
Alliance	Simpson C.	1752		−
Conservative	Kenton G.	1540	40.3	−2.2
Conservative	Hargreaves J.	1531		−
Conservative	Norris G.	1424		−
Labour	Nixon S.	302	7.9	+1.4
Labour	Risner P. Ms.	293		−
Labour	Brown J. Ms.	293		−
Turnout			57.5	−2.4

Hampton Hill (3)
Party	Candidate	Votes	%	±%
Alliance	Webb J.	1741	45.5	+11.3
Alliance	Simpson A.	1707		−
Alliance	Mellor P. Ms.	1705		−
Conservative	Champion H. Ms.	1543	40.3	−9.9
Conservative	Lockyer P.	1477		−
Conservative	Woodward A. Ms.	1359		−
Labour	Samuels G.	543	14.2	−1.4
Labour	Rowlands P. Ms.	530		−
Labour	Wilson G.	509		−
Turnout			56.4	−1.4

Hampton Nursery (2)
Party	Candidate	Votes	%	±%
Alliance	Woodriff M. Ms.	1433	58.7	+16.9
Alliance	Ball R.	1372		−
Conservative	Bull J. Ms.	806	33.0	−13.8
Conservative	Leamy S.	767		−
Labour	Schaler H. Ms.	201	8.2	−3.1
Labour	Walters K.	198		−
Turnout			54.5	−7.6

Hampton Wick (3)
Party	Candidate	Votes	%	±%
Alliance	Garside M.	2153	49.9	+18.1
Alliance	Morgan R.	1951		−
Alliance	McDougall M.	1933		−
Conservative	Arbour A.	1691	39.2	−15.1
Conservative	Marlow D.	1624		−
Conservative	Hatton P.	1595		−
Labour	Tutchell E. Ms.	474	11.0	+0.9
Labour	Kelly R.	457		−
Labour	Ward G.	450		−
Turnout			58.8	+6.1

Heathfield (3)
Party	Candidate	Votes	%	±%
Alliance	Wilfred Percival Letch	2097	53.3	+11.8
Alliance	King R.	2012		−
Alliance	Jones M.	1919		−
Conservative	Haywood T. Ms.	1356	34.5	−14.1
Conservative	Wright T.	1347		−
Conservative	Gillen J.	1345		−
Labour	Fretag G.	481	12.2	+2.3
Labour	Bristow A.	478		−
Labour	Boland C.	477		−
Turnout			55.3	−2.1

Kew (3)
Party	Candidate	Votes	%	±%
Alliance	Tonge J. Ms.	2305	47.1	+3.5
Alliance	Lourie A.	2123		−
Alliance	Halliday N.	2051		−
Conservative	Morley L. Ms.	1524	31.1	+0.2
Conservative	Upton J.	1493		−
Conservative	Winning V. Ms.	1447		−
Labour	Boaler C.	533	10.9	+3.3
Green	Johnman A. Ms.	532	10.9	+6.9
Labour	Fowler J.	516		−
Labour	Kurtha A.	473		−
Turnout			60.6	−2.7

Mortlake (3)
Party	Candidate	Votes	%	±%
Alliance	Razzall D. Ms.	2203	62.4	+0.3
Alliance	Razzall E.	2143		−
Alliance	Searby K.	2064		−
Conservative	Learmouth A.	847	24.0	−3.6
Conservative	Herrod M. Ms.	836		−
Conservative	Kellet A.	818		−
Labour	Dalglish J.	479	13.6	+3.3
Labour	Hill J. Ms.	458		−
Labour	Taylor R. Ms.	456		−
Turnout			58.2	+3.1

Palewell (3)
Party	Candidate	Votes	%	±%
Alliance	Hamwee S. Ms.	2187	53.7	+6.4
Alliance	Manners A.	2103		−
Alliance	Summers J. Ms.	2055		−
Conservative	Morell K.	1490	36.6	−8.8
Conservative	Saunders J.	1473		−
Conservative	Le Hunte P. Ms.	1420		−
Labour	Hart A.	392	9.6	+2.4
Labour	Mostyn J. Ms.	366		−
Labour	Cooper L.	350		−
Turnout			65.1	+0.4

Richmond Hill (3)
Party	Candidate	Votes	%	±%
Alliance	Simmonds A.	1976	56.5	+3.9
Alliance	Tippett J. Ms.	1967		−
Alliance	Hennessy S. Ms.	1965		−
Conservative	Taylor P.	1169	33.4	−8.5
Conservative	Sheehy V. Ms.	1133		−
Conservative	Cummins R.	1130		−
Labour	Chamberlain M. Ms.	354	10.1	+4.6
Labour	Luckhurst T.	312		−
Labour	Bunting G.	309		−
Turnout			54.9	−3.6

Richmond Town (2)
Party	Candidate	Votes	%	±%
Alliance	Cornish A. Ms.	1617	58.1	+4.9
Alliance	Lewis T.	1497		−
Conservative	Goodman P.	795	28.5	−6.3
Conservative	Watts I.	785		−
Labour	Marder B.	373	13.4	+3.2
Labour	Richardson P.	366		−
Turnout			62.0	−4.2

South Twickenham (3)
Party	Candidate	Votes	%	±%
Alliance	Pope G.	2046	48.4	+6.4
Alliance	Beattie R.	1871		−
Alliance	Swords S.	1840		−
Conservative	Ford M.	1541	36.5	−3.9
Conservative	Allen A.	1513		−
Conservative	Frazer C.	1509		−
Labour	Smith T.	640	15.1	+5.2
Labour	Hathaway K.	610		−
Labour	Macpherson D.	579		−
Turnout			56.6	−1.4

Teddington (3)
Party	Candidate	Votes	%	±%
Alliance	Elengorn M.	2466	56.1	+12.3
Alliance	Pippard E. Ms.	2358		−
Alliance	O'Connor E. Ms.	2334		−
Conservative	Temlett P.	1358	30.9	−10.4
Conservative	Turk J. Ms.	1279		−
Conservative	Waddington-Jones R.	1240		−
Labour	Makepeace D.	569	13.0	+1.0
Labour	Gilligan K.	568		−
Labour	Bayer M.	525		−
Turnout			60.5	−1.7

West Twickenham (2)
Party	Candidate	Votes	%	±%
Alliance	Waller J.	1426	53.4	+1.9
Alliance	Emerson M.	1287		−
Conservative	Geach D.	628	23.5	−9.1
Labour	Cobb S.	618	23.1	+7.2
Conservative	Warhurst E.	840		−
Labour	Nixon G.	592		−
Turnout			55.3	−1.8

Whitton (3)
Party	Candidate	Votes	%	±%
Alliance	Mackinney K.	2000	46.0	+2.1
Alliance	Lipscomb E. Ms.	1960		−
Alliance	Goswami S.	1841		−
Conservative	Riley K.	1453	33.4	−13.9
Conservative	Warhurst S. Ms.	1408		−
Conservative	Hall H.	1408		−
Labour	Alexander V.	530	12.2	+5.0
Labour	Guichard S.	503		−
Labour	Paggetti S. Ms.	502		−
Independent	Jezzard G.	361	8.3	N/A
Turnout			60.4	+1.1
