= 1971 Richmond upon Thames London Borough Council election =

The 1971 Richmond upon Thames Council election took place on 13 May 1971 to elect members of Richmond upon Thames London Borough Council in London, England. The whole council was up for election and the Conservative party stayed in overall control of the council.

== Election result ==
Party	Votes		Seats		
Conservative Party	25,381 (43.83%)	▼15.41	36 (66.7%)	36 / 54	▼18
Labour Party	21,501 (37.13%)	▲17.07	15 (27.8%)	15 / 54	▲15
Liberal Party	9,199 (15.88%)	▼2.20	3 (5.6%)	3 / 54	▲3
Residents Association	980 (1.69%)	▼0.47	0 (0.0%)	0 / 54	0
Independent	488 (0.84%)	▲0.63	0 (0.0%)	0 / 54	0
National Front	232 (0.40%)	N/A	0 (0.0%)	0 / 54	N/A
Communist Party	133 (0.23%)	▼0.02	0 (0.0%)	0 / 54	0

↓
15	3	36
Labour	Liberal	Conservative

== Ward results ==
Barnes (3)
Party	Candidate	Votes	%	±%
Conservative	Mason H.	1717	48.3	−15.3
Conservative	Otty N.	1697		−
Conservative	Roberts J. Ms.	1652		−
Labour	Ennals E. Ms.	1395	39.2	+19.7
Labour	Day R.	1373		−
Labour	Aylett E.	1307		−
Liberal	Paish A.	444	12.5	−4.3
Liberal	Rundle W. Ms.	428		−
Liberal	Dons J. Ms.	395		−
Turnout			45.7	+1.1

Central Twickenham (3)
Party	Candidate	Votes	%	±%
Conservative	Williams J.	1307	48.6	−10.4
Conservative	Cooper S. Ms.	1304		−
Conservative	Tate W.	1298		−
Labour	Powell M.	782	29.0	+8.4
Labour	Gilbert J.	775		−
Labour	Bennett R.	756		−
Liberal	Child D.	516	19.2	+2.9
Liberal	Marlow R.	513		−
Liberal	Morrison A.	476		−
Independent	Lock J.	87	3.2	+1.0
Turnout			42.6	+3.3

East Sheen (3)
Party	Candidate	Votes	%	±%
Conservative	Roberts G.	1401	51.4	−32.4
Conservative	Grose S.	1364		−
Conservative	Lythe G.	1345		−
Liberal	Parton J.	924	33.9	N/A
Liberal	Manners A.	921		−
Liberal	Waller J.	921		−
Labour	Renier O. Ms.	401	14.7	−1.5
Labour	Seager G.	387		−
Labour	Bogner R.	383		−
Turnout			46.7	+11.6

East Twickenham (3)
Party	Candidate	Votes	%	±%
Conservative	Leaney A.	1386	51.6	−12.2
Conservative	Smith D.	1319		−
Conservative	Golday-Fox F.	1290		−
Labour	Jones W.	882	32.8	+14.3
Labour	Jones H. Ms.	878		−
Labour	Schaler H. Ms.	814		−
Liberal	Jakobi S. Ms.	417	15.5	−2.2
Liberal	Jakobi S.	404		−
Liberal	Nunn S.	378		−
Turnout			39.4	−0.7

Ham & Petersham (3)
Party	Candidate	Votes	%	±%
Labour	Bayliss B.	1909	51.8	+3.1
Labour	Palmer A.	1866		−
Labour	Stevens R.	1772		−
Conservative	Cuming M.	1090	29.6	−5.5
Conservative	Battle T.	1081		−
Conservative	Stansfield Smith A. Ms.	1072		−
Liberal	Williams D.	683	18.5	+2.3
Liberal	Trafford P.	618		−
Liberal	Debenham V.	603		−
Turnout			56.3	+10.0

Hampton (3)
Party	Candidate	Votes	%	±%
Conservative	Kenton V.	2049	54.7	−7.9
Conservative	Hargreaves J.	1925		−
Conservative	Lewis H.	1872		−
Labour	Robinson W.	995	26.6	+14.9
Labour	Holman C.	940		−
Labour	Windsor R.	842		−
Liberal	Reddrop A.	702	18.7	−7.0
Liberal	Weisblatt W.	699		−
Liberal	Cavendish-Pell D.	562		−
Turnout			42.9	−3.3

Hampton Hill (3)
Party	Candidate	Votes	%	±%
Labour	Connor M. Ms.	1623	45.5	+26.5
Labour	Harris D.	1598		−
Labour	Elmes K.	1571		−
Conservative	Champion H. Ms.	1561	43.7	−17.7
Conservative	Lockyer P.	1557		−
Conservative	Samuels G.	1527		−
Liberal	Twaits J.	385	10.8	−8.8
Liberal	Maryon L.	355		−
Liberal	Starnes A.	343		−
Turnout			46.5	+5.0

Hampton Wick (3)
Party	Candidate	Votes	%	±%
Conservative	Cooper G.	1701	52.8	−13.8
Conservative	Wilkins O. Ms.	1674		−
Conservative	Arbour A.	1653		−
Labour	Heitzmann A.	1184	36.8	+21.1
Labour	Packer E.	1144		−
Labour	Tutchell E. Ms.	1142		−
Liberal	Brett M. Ms.	336	10.4	−7.3
Liberal	Easthope J.	307		−
Liberal	Stevens K.	287		−
Turnout			42.9	−0.2

Heathfield (3)
Party	Candidate	Votes	%	±%
Labour	Goldring P.	1695	54.5	+28.6
Labour	Day D. Ms.	1673		−
Labour	Peters P. Ms.	1667		−
Conservative	Baker J.	1416	45.5	−17.8
Conservative	Woodward A. Ms.	1410		−
Conservative	Stephenson E.	1385		−
Turnout			47.2	+3.3

Kew (3)
Party	Candidate	Votes	%	±%
Liberal	Anthony Stanley Richard Rundle	2409	46.0	+17.8
Liberal	Blomfield D.	1876		−
Liberal	Dickson R. Ms.	1806		−
Conservative	Nugent J.	1640	31.3	−2.9
Conservative	Morland R.	1586		−
Conservative	Hodgson M. Ms.	1540		−
Labour	Campion E.	1078	20.6	+6.2
Labour	Gilbert P.	965		−
Labour	Kareh A.	892		−
Communist	Tendler E. Ms.	114	2.2	−
Turnout			55.9	+1.0

Mortlake (3)
Party	Candidate	Votes	%	±%
Labour	Masters E.	2008	61.7	+22.5
Labour	Hart A.	1965		−
Labour	Mostyn J. Ms.	1956		−
Conservative	Counter F.	886	27.2	−17.4
Conservative	Kelly J.	846		−
Conservative	Muteau C.	822		−
Independent	Drane A.	201	6.2	N/A
Liberal	Lattimer G.	158	4.9	−6.5
Liberal	Seekings H.	139		−
Liberal	Collins J.	137		−
Turnout			50.7	+7.0

Palewell (3)
Party	Candidate	Votes	%	±%
Conservative	Barrow N.	1564	63.9	−19.1
Conservative	Wade S.	1556		−
Conservative	Needs G.	1554		−
Labour	Lamb H.	882	36.1	+19.1
Labour	Hunt A. Ms.	869		−
Labour	Hunt L.	865		−
Turnout			35.9	+1.7

Richmond Hill (3)
Party	Candidate	Votes	%	±%
Conservative	Ormiston J.	1078	37.5	−19.9
Conservative	Foran M.	1055		−
Conservative	Abell H. Ms.	1039		−
Liberal	Nemet M. Ms.	700	24.3	−4.9
Liberal	Lewis B.	624		−
Residents	Billingham A.	565	19.6	N/A
Liberal	Roberts M. Ms.	551		−
Labour	Kidger D. Ms.	533	18.5	+5.1
Labour	Martin T.	517		−
Labour	Walker P. Ms.	497		−
Turnout			38.5	−1.7

Richmond Town (3)
Party	Candidate	Votes	%	±%
Conservative	Tremlett G.	1172	38.9	−21.8
Conservative	Spain T.	1127		−
Conservative	Wilton E.	1076		−
Labour	Burns F.	1043	34.6	+11.3
Labour	Dunne W.	1036		−
Labour	Langford W.	1025		−
Residents	Dennis K. Ms.	415	13.8	N/A
Liberal	Cuff S.	382	12.7	−3.4
Liberal	Lee F.	378		−
Residents	Pattington E.	359		−
Liberal	Morcom J.	357		−
Turnout			44.4	+1.6

South Twickenham (3)
Party	Candidate	Votes	%	±%
Conservative	Woodward J.	1712	54.2	−14.2
Conservative	Bligh T.	1685		−
Conservative	Godlonton A. Ms.	1657		−
Labour	Park M. Ms.	1449	45.8	+27.3
Labour	Maidment P.	1438		−
Labour	Hodgetts J. Ms.	1407		−
Turnout			41.1	−0.1

Teddington (3)
Party	Candidate	Votes	%	±%
Conservative	Gold M.	1289	45.0	−9.6
Conservative	West A.	1274		−
Conservative	Newstead L.	1236		−
Labour	Gilligan K.	1055	36.8	+21.4
Labour	Carr-Hill C.	996		−
Labour	Smith G.	993		−
Liberal	Newcombe F.	319	11.1	−18.9
Liberal	Counsell J.	294		−
Liberal	Hills I.	271		−
Independent	Leigh F. Ms.	200	7.0	N/A
Independent	Leigh J.	195		−
Turnout			41.1	−5.2

West Twickenham (3)
Party	Candidate	Votes	%	±%
Labour	Grant J.	1659	58.1	+24.0
Labour	Brown J. Ms.	1612		−
Labour	Samuel G.	1556		−
Conservative	Johnson G.	1197	41.9	−14.5
Conservative	White I. Ms.	1145		−
Conservative	McKie R.	1126		−
Turnout			42.8	+1.2

Whitton (3)
Party	Candidate	Votes	%	±%
Conservative	Lambeth J.	1215	38.0	−21.8
Conservative	Warren W.	1177		−
Conservative	Grimston N.	1142		−
Labour	Potter C. Ms.	928	29.0	+17.0
Labour	Gaines M.	918		−
Labour	Taylor V. Ms.	832		−
Liberal	Letch W.	824	25.8	−2.4
Liberal	Barnes C.	819		−
Liberal	Marshall S.	797		−
National Front	Russell E.	232	7.3	N/A
National Front	Denville-Faulkner T.	224		−
National Front	Wakeford T.	213		−
Turnout			48.2	+6.0
