= 1974 Richmond upon Thames London Borough Council election =

The 1974 Richmond upon Thames Council election took place on 2 May 1974 to elect members of Richmond upon Thames London Borough Council in London, England. The whole council was up for election and the Conservative Party stayed in overall control of the council.

== Election result ==
Party	Votes		Seats		
Conservative Party	25,885 (40.91%)	▼2.91	36 (66.7%)	36 / 54	0
Liberal Party	19,746 (31.21%)	▲15.32	10 (18.5%)	10 / 54	▲7
Labour Party	17,157 (27.12%)	▼10.01	8 (14.8%)	8 / 54	▼7
Independent	277 (0.44%)	▼0.40	0 (0.0%)	0 / 54	0
Communist Party	109 (0.17%)	▼0.06	0 (0.0%)	0 / 54	0
Save London Action Group	98 (0.2%)	N/A	0 (0.0%)	0 / 54	N/A

↓
8	10	36
Labour	Liberal	Conservative

== Ward results ==
Barnes (3)
Party	Candidate	Votes	%	±%
Conservative	Mason H.	1663	43.7	−4.6
Conservative	Norris M. Ms.	1653		−
Conservative	Robinson J. Ms.	1521		−
Liberal	Huxstep M. Ms.	978	25.7	+13.2
Liberal	Murdoch C. Ms.	921		−
Liberal	O'Kelly F.	907		−
Labour	Blundy K. Ms.	791	20.8	−18.4
Labour	Duell M.	781		−
Labour	Seager G.	717		−
Independent	Hancox P. Ms.	277	7.3	N/A
Save London Action Group	Kemmis Betty S. Ms.	98	2.6	N/A
Turnout			49.6	+3.9

Central Twickenham (3)
Party	Candidate	Votes	%	±%
Conservative	Tate W.	1411	45.1	−3.5
Conservative	Williams J.	1356		−
Conservative	Bristow R.	1288		−
Labour	Powell M.	1157	36.9	+7.9
Labour	Shelton J.	1074		−
Labour	Proud A.	1065		−
Liberal	Lewis B.	564	18.0	−1.2
Liberal	Sanders A.	529		−
Liberal	Gan R.	511		−
Turnout			52.2	+9.6

East Sheen (3)
Party	Candidate	Votes	%	±%
Conservative	Alcock R.	1480	47.2	−4.2
Conservative	Green S.	1455		−
Conservative	Grose S.	1442		−
Liberal	Kinchin-Smith R. Ms.	1292	41.2	+7.3
Liberal	Cook P.	1210		−
Liberal	Parton J.	1179		−
Labour	Millward A. Ms.	366	11.7	−3.0
Labour	Fuller F.	357		−
Labour	Hunt A. Ms.	347		−
Turnout			52.8	+6.1

East Twickenham (3)
Party	Candidate	Votes	%	±%
Conservative	Leaney A.	1448	43.6	−8.0
Conservative	Bristow E. Ms.	1399		−
Conservative	Hall H.	1388		−
Labour	Pardington J. Ms.	1076	32.4	−0.4
Labour	Eldridge E.	990		−
Labour	Folkman P.	952		−
Liberal	Nunn S.	800	24.1	+8.6
Liberal	Ricketts G. Ms.	735		−
Liberal	White P.	712		−
Turnout			50.3	+10.9

Ham & Petersham (3)
Party	Candidate	Votes	%	±%
Liberal	Williams, David	1458	38.4	+19.9
Labour	Palmer A.	1395	36.7	−15.1
Labour	Bayliss B.	1391		−
Liberal	Carr-Jones C.	1336		−
Liberal	Adams M.	1308		−
Labour	Stevens R.	1258		−
Conservative	Pritchard D.	945	24.9	−4.7
Conservative	Goodman V. Ms.	926		−
Conservative	Thomas N.	869		−
Turnout			56.7	+0.4

Hampton (3)
Party	Candidate	Votes	%	±%
Conservative	Kenton G.	2406	54.7	+0.0
Conservative	Hargreaves J.	2213		−
Conservative	Lewis H.	2098		−
Liberal	Woodriff M. Ms.	1215	27.6	+8.9
Liberal	Anstead N.	1171		−
Liberal	Maclachlan A.	1116		−
Labour	Lalis M.	778	17.7	−8.9
Labour	Smith M.	768		−
Labour	Melunsky B. Ms.	756		−
Turnout			50.2	+7.3

Hampton Hill (3)
Party	Candidate	Votes	%	±%
Conservative	Champion H. Ms.	1538	39.1	−4.6
Labour	Connor Lady M.	1525	38.7	−6.8
Labour	Samuels G.	1519		−
Labour	Elmes K.	1480		−
Conservative	Bond P.	1450		−
Conservative	Warhurst E.	1426		−
Liberal	Booth L. Ms.	873	22.2	+11.4
Liberal	Spencer B.	814		−
Liberal	Ward-Lewis C.	802		−
Turnout			50.3	+3.8

Hampton Wick (3)
Party	Candidate	Votes	%	±%
Conservative	Cooper G.	1879	51.8	−1.0
Conservative	Arbour, Anthony Francis	1853		−
Conservative	Marlow D.	1843		−
Labour	Morgan A.	998	27.5	−9.3
Labour	Heitzmann A.	992		−
Labour	Worsnip J. Ms.	975		−
Liberal	Lloyd S. Ms.	748	20.6	+10.2
Liberal	Stone M.	736		−
Liberal	Perry J.	701		−
Turnout			48.2	+5.3

Heathfield (3)
Party	Candidate	Votes	%	±%
Conservative	Woodward A. Ms.	1344	39.6	−5.9
Conservative	Anderson G.	1318		−
Conservative	Baker J.	1308		−
Labour	Goldring P.	1269	37.4	−17.1
Labour	May P.	1235		−
Labour	Piper R.	1207		−
Liberal	Bullen C.	778	22.9	N/A
Liberal	Mackinney K.	744		−
Liberal	Humphrey P.	734		−
Turnout			53.2	+6.0

Kew (3)
Party	Candidate	Votes	%	±%
Liberal	Rundle, Anthony Stanley Richard	2427	50.1	+4.1
Liberal	Blomfield D.	2015		−
Liberal	Worth L.	2011		−
Conservative	Dyer S.	1497	30.9	−0.4
Conservative	Laing D.	1467		−
Conservative	Shaddock C.	1358		−
Labour	Love A.	812	16.8	−3.8
Labour	Gilbert P.	796		−
Labour	Marshall-Andrews G. Ms.	735		−
Communist	Tendler E. Ms.	109	2.2	+0.0
Turnout			56.0	+0.1

Mortlake (3)
Party	Candidate	Votes	%	±%
Liberal	Razzall, Edward Timothy	1270	41.9	+36.8
Liberal	Scott-Owen R. Ms.	1244		−
Liberal	Wainwright D.	1242		−
Labour	Masters E.	1140	37.5	−24.2
Labour	Hart A.	1088		−
Labour	Mostyn J. Ms.	1073		−
Conservative	Irvine M.	633	20.8	−6.4
Conservative	Nugent J.	560		−
Conservative	Popham J.	540		−
Turnout			52.9	+2.2

Palewell (3)
Party	Candidate	Votes	%	±%
Conservative	Stow J.	1424	47.1	−16.8
Conservative	Wade S.	1398		−
Conservative	Barrow N.	1378		−
Liberal	Manners A.	1006	33.3	N/A
Liberal	Townsend G.	939		−
Liberal	Van Der Voort R.	922		−
Labour	Brandon E.	593	19.6	−16.5
Labour	Lamb H.	586		−
Labour	Hoskins D.	582		−
Turnout			44.4	+8.5

Richmond Hill (3)
Party	Candidate	Votes	%	±%
Conservative	Ormiston J.	1234	44.7	+7.2
Conservative	Leigh E.	1177		−
Conservative	Foran M.	1174		−
Liberal	Dickson R. Ms.	1135	41.1	+16.8
Liberal	Macaulay W. Ms.	1106		−
Liberal	Halford W.	1061		−
Labour	Martin G. Ms.	394	14.3	−4.2
Labour	Radley D.	367		−
Labour	Kidd V. Ms.	362		−
Turnout			44.6	+6.1

Richmond Town (3)
Party	Candidate	Votes	%	±%
Liberal	Waller, John	1743	47.0	+34.3
Liberal	Cornish A. Ms.	1494		−
Liberal	Norton H. Ms.	1474		−
Conservative	Saunders J.	1283	34.6	−4.3
Conservative	Spain T.	1175		−
Conservative	Lindenberg E.	1140		−
Labour	Langford W.	682	18.4	−16.2
Labour	Marshall-Andrews R.	667		−
Labour	Dunne W.	637		−
Turnout			56.9	+12.5

South Twickenham (3)
Party	Candidate	Votes	%	±%
Conservative	Bligh T.	1743	50.9	−3.3
Conservative	Hollebone R.	1681		−
Conservative	Millar N. Ms.	1623		−
Labour	Hathaway K.	1024	29.9	−15.9
Labour	Cordingley K.	1022		−
Labour	Welstand H.	999		−
Liberal	Cook N.	655	19.1	N/A
Liberal	Collier J.	621		−
Liberal	Tooley M. Ms.	569		−
Turnout			45.5	+4.4

Teddington (3)
Party	Candidate	Votes	%	±%
Conservative	Gold M.	1507	45.7	+0.7
Conservative	Buckley N. Ms.	1492		−
Labour	Gilligan K.	1214	36.8	+0.0
Labour	Stafford H.	1180		−
Labour	Glass H.	1179		−
Liberal	Reeves C. Ms.	580	17.6	+6.5
Liberal	Twaits J.	534		−
Liberal	Bryning J.	528		−
Turnout			48.4	+7.3

West Twickenham (3)
Party	Candidate	Votes	%	±%
Labour	Samuel G.	1097	35.5	−22.6
Labour	Kareh R.	1077		−
Labour	Brown J. Ms.	1066		−
Conservative	Fuller W.	1036	33.5	−8.4
Conservative	Saunders D. Ms.	994		−
Conservative	Kellett M. Ms.	985		−
Liberal	Cornwell D.	956	30.9	−2.6
Liberal	Lucy C.	938		−
Liberal	Parry J.	907		−
Turnout			47.9	+5.1

Whitton (3)
Party	Candidate	Votes	%	±%
Conservative	Lambeth J.	1414	40.1	+2.1
Conservative	Warren W.	1322		−
Conservative	Newstead L.	1303		−
Liberal	Barnes C.	1268	35.9	+10.1
Liberal	Wilfred Percival Letch	1228		−
Liberal	Marshall S.	1127		−
Labour	Potter C. Ms.	846	24.0	−5.0
Labour	Peters D. Ms.	801		−
Labour	Tait A.	788		−
Turnout			53.3	+5.1
