= 2006 Richmond upon Thames London Borough Council election =

2006 local election in England

- 4 May 2006

All 54 seats to Richmond upon Thames London Borough Council 28 seats needed for a majority
	First party	Second party
Party	Liberal Democrats	Conservative
Seats won	36	18
Seat change	▲21	▼21
Popular vote	30,362	26,497
Percentage	44.9%	39.2%
Swing	▲8.9%	▼4.4%
- Map of the results of the 2006 Richmond upon Thames council election. Conservatives in blue and Liberal Democrats in yellow.
Council control before election
Conservative
Council control after election
Liberal Democrats

Elections to the Richmond upon Thames London Borough Council were held on 4 May 2006. The whole council was up for election for the first time since the 2002 election. The Liberal Democrats regained control of the council which had been Conservative run from 2002.

== Election result ==
Richmond upon Thames Council election 2006 results
Party	Seats	Gains	Losses	Net gain/loss	Seats %	Votes %	Votes	+/−
Liberal Democrats	36	21	0	▲21	66.7	44.9	30,362	▲8.9
Conservative	18	0	21	▼21	33.3	39.2	26,497	▼4.4
Green	0	0	0	Steady	0.0	7.1	4,822	▲3.3
Labour	0	0	0	Steady	0.0	5.6	3,803	▼8.5
Independent	0	0	0	Steady	0.0	1.6	1,049	▼0.7
BNP	0	0	0	Steady	0.0	0.8	557	New
UKIP	0	0	0	Steady	0.0	0.6	399	▲0.4
CPA	0	0	0	Steady	0.0	0.3	176	New

== Ward results ==
The electorate of each ward elects three councillors.

=== Barnes ===
Barnes
Party	Candidate	Votes	%	±%
Conservative	Christine Percival	1,891	52.85	
Conservative	Paul Hodgins	1,847	51.62	
Conservative	Benedict Stanberry	1,749	48.88	
Liberal Democrats	Barbara Westmoreland	1,569	43.85	
Liberal Democrats	Paul Dare	1,531	42.79	
Liberal Democrats	Marlene Emerson	1,513	42.29	
Labour	Ann Neimer	147	4.11	
Labour	Frank Cooper	146	4.08	
Labour	Ragna Garlake	123	3.44	
Turnout		3,578 (6645)	53.85	+12.8
Conservative hold		Swing		
Conservative hold		Swing		
Conservative hold		Swing		

=== East Sheen ===
East Sheen
Party	Candidate	Votes	%	±%
Conservative	Nicholas True	2,181	60.38	
Conservative	Virginia Morris	2,126	58.86	
Conservative	Nicola Urquhart	2,096	58.03	
Liberal Democrats	Jane Mather	994	27.52	
Liberal Democrats	Philip Morris	973	26.94	
Liberal Democrats	Jonathan Smalldon	938	25.97	
Green	Sylvia Wills	570	15.78	
Labour	Anthony Channell	212	5.87	
Labour	Maureen Metzger	193	5.34	
Turnout		3,612 (6874)	52.55	
Conservative hold		Swing		
Conservative hold		Swing		
Conservative hold		Swing		

=== Fulwell and Hampton Hill ===
Fulwell and Hampton Hill
Party	Candidate	Votes	%	±%
Liberal Democrats	Malcolm Eady	2,015	59.04	
Liberal Democrats	Jonathan Cardy	1,998	58.54	
Liberal Democrats	Jeremy Elloy	1,972	57.78	
Conservative	Sallie Colak-Antic	1,072	31.41	
Conservative	Gloria Cadet	1,032	30.24	
Conservative	Jonathan Hollis	985	28.86	
Green	Monica Saunders	458	13.42	
Labour	Leonard Griffiths	222	6.50	
Turnout		3,413 (6754)	50.53	
Liberal Democrats hold		Swing		
Liberal Democrats hold		Swing		
Liberal Democrats gain from Conservative		Swing		

=== Ham, Petersham, and Richmond Riverside ===
Ham, Petersham, and Richmond Riverside
Party	Candidate	Votes	%	±%
Liberal Democrats	Susan Jones	1,999	57.77	
Liberal Democrats	Brian Miller	1,821	52.63	
Liberal Democrats	David Williams	1,806	52.20	
Conservative	David Sparrow	1,161	33.55	
Conservative	Ronan McCarthy	1,120	32.37	
Conservative	Robert Thompson	1,037	29.97	
Green	Anita McMahon	323	9.34	
UKIP	David Jeffery	168	4.86	
Labour	Doreen Masters	160	4.67	
Labour	Pamela Risner	158	4.61	
Turnout		3,426 (6571)	52.14	
Liberal Democrats hold		Swing		
Liberal Democrats hold		Swing		
Liberal Democrats hold		Swing		

=== Hampton ===
Hampton
Party	Candidate	Votes	%	±%
Liberal Democrats	Suzette Nicholson	1,864	52.67	
Liberal Democrats	Raymond Ball	1,819	51.40	
Liberal Democrats	Carol Stratton	1,816	51.31	
Conservative	Anna Record	1,524	43.06	
Conservative	Helen Boulton	1,491	42.13	
Conservative	Hilary Smith	1,393	39.36	
Labour	Louisa Spawls	196	5.54	
Labour	Jenifer Wyatt	121	3.42	
Turnout		3,539 (6839)	51.75	
Liberal Democrats gain from Conservative		Swing		
Liberal Democrats gain from Conservative		Swing		
Liberal Democrats gain from Conservative		Swing		

=== Hampton North ===
Hampton North
Party	Candidate	Votes	%	±%
Conservative	Catherine Howard	1,574	52.43	
Conservative	Martin Seymour	1,556	51.83	
Conservative	Geoffrey Samuel	1,493	49.73	
Liberal Democrats	Paul Bensilum	1,319	43.94	
Liberal Democrats	Matthew Wherry	1,236	41.17	
Liberal Democrats	James Cox	1,228	40.91	
Turnout		3,002 (6506)	46.14	
Conservative hold		Swing		
Conservative hold		Swing		
Conservative hold		Swing		

=== Hampton Wick ===
Hampton Wick
Party	Candidate	Votes	%	±%
Conservative	Tony Arbour	1,949	60.42	
Conservative	Elizabeth Parsons	1,726	53.50	
Conservative	Gareth Evans	1,721	53.35	
Liberal Democrats	Jennifer Churchill	1,061	32.89	
Liberal Democrats	John Whittall	804	24.92	
Liberal Democrats	Martin Pierce	721	22.35	
Green	Michael Bangham	577	17.89	
Labour	Derek Tutchell	248	7.69	
Labour	Eva Tutchell	242	7.50	
Turnout		3,226 (6814)	47.34	
Conservative hold		Swing		
Conservative hold		Swing		
Conservative hold		Swing		

=== Heathfield ===
Heathfield
Party	Candidate	Votes	%	±%
Liberal Democrats	Robert King	1,900	55.60	
Liberal Democrats	John Coombs	1,875	54.87	
Liberal Democrats	William Treble	1,745	51.07	
Conservative	Hilary Dance	870	25.46	
Conservative	Gillian Garrow	783	22.91	
Conservative	Dawn Hayles	776	22.71	
BNP	Christopher Forster	557	16.30	
Labour	Niki Tanto	229	6.70	
Labour	Jacqueline Morgan	218	6.38	
Independent	Simon Holmes	218	6.38	
Labour	Elizabeth Mackenzie	212	6.20	
Turnout		3,417 (6599)	51.78	
Liberal Democrats hold		Swing		
Liberal Democrats hold		Swing		
Liberal Democrats hold		Swing		

=== Kew ===
Kew
Party	Candidate	Votes	%	±%
Liberal Democrats	Serge Lourie	2,089	51.73	
Liberal Democrats	Shaista Sheehan	1,972	48.84	
Liberal Democrats	George Beevor	1,934	47.89	
Conservative	Robin Jowit	1,674	41.46	
Conservative	David Linnette	1,539	38.11	
Conservative	Sarah Keen	1,523	37.72	
Green	Sylvia Levi	424	10.50	
Labour	Kate Segall	203	5.03	
Labour	Gareth James	190	4.71	
Labour	Joao Silva	144	3.57	
Turnout		4,038 (7133)	56.61	
Liberal Democrats gain from Conservative		Swing		
Liberal Democrats hold		Swing		
Liberal Democrats hold		Swing		

=== Mortlake and Barnes Common ===
Mortlake and Barnes Common
Party	Candidate	Votes	%	±%
Liberal Democrats	Eleanor Stanier	1,750	47.68	
Liberal Democrats	Anna Davies	1,722	46.92	
Liberal Democrats	Zoe McLeod	1,695	46.19	
Conservative	Jonathan de Florio	1,673	45.59	
Conservative	John Earl	1,644	44.80	
Conservative	Clive Hills	1,623	44.22	
Labour	Brian Matthews	215	5.86	
Labour	Barbara Underwood	208	5.67	
Labour	Barnaby Marder	185	5.04	
Turnout		3,670 (7100)	51.69	
Liberal Democrats gain from Conservative		Swing		
Liberal Democrats gain from Conservative		Swing		
Liberal Democrats gain from Conservative		Swing		

=== North Richmond ===
North Richmond
Party	Candidate	Votes	%	±%
Liberal Democrats	Celia Hodges	1,649	48.26	
Liberal Democrats	Jane Dodds	1,605	46.97	
Liberal Democrats	Marc Cranfield-Adams	1,579	46.21	
Conservative	Philip Ingram	1,534	44.89	
Conservative	Mark Roscoe	1,509	44.16	
Conservative	Phillip Taylor	1,494	43.72	
Labour	Derek Somers	227	6.64	
CPA	Enid Kimmerling	111	3.25	
Turnout		3,417 (6968)	49.04	
Liberal Democrats gain from Conservative		Swing		
Liberal Democrats gain from Conservative		Swing		
Liberal Democrats gain from Conservative		Swing		

=== South Richmond ===
South Richmond
Party	Candidate	Votes	%	±%
Conservative	Frances Bouchier	1,674	48.38	
Conservative	Pamela Fleming	1,636	47.28	
Conservative	Rodney Bennett	1,588	45.90	
Liberal Democrats	Andrew Pilkington	1,489	43.03	
Liberal Democrats	Tanya Williams	1,451	41.94	
Liberal Democrats	Saiful Islam	1,382	39.94	
Green	Owen Roberts	500	14.45	
Labour	Margaret Robson	219	6.33	
Turnout		3,460 (6880)	50.29	
Conservative hold		Swing		
Conservative hold		Swing		
Conservative hold		Swing		

=== South Twickenham ===
South Twickenham
Party	Candidate	Votes	%	±%
Conservative	Clare Head	1,498	45.60	
Conservative	David Porter	1,462	44.51	
Conservative	David Marlow	1,444	43.96	
Liberal Democrats	Matthew Hull	1,264	38.48	
Liberal Democrats	Steven Topol	1,260	38.36	
Liberal Democrats	Michael Butlin	1,246	37.93	
Independent	Douglas Orchard	357	10.87	
Independent	John Armstrong	321	9.77	
Labour	Paul Tanto	254	7.73	
Labour	Howard Marchant	246	7.49	
Turnout		3,285 (7142)	46.00	
Conservative hold		Swing		
Conservative hold		Swing		
Conservative hold		Swing		

=== St Margaret's and North Twickenham ===
St Margaret's and North Twickenham
Party	Candidate	Votes	%	±%
Liberal Democrats	Geoffrey Acton	2,019	53.01	
Liberal Democrats	Philip Morgan	1,886	49.51	
Liberal Democrats	Harbrinder Khosa	1,811	47.55	
Conservative	Simon Lamb	1,249	32.79	
Conservative	Catherine Searle	1,225	32.16	
Conservative	Annie Hambidge	1,045	27.44	
Green	Judy Maciejowska	707	18.56	
Independent	Barry Edwards	474	12.44	
Labour	William Devine	262	6.88	
UKIP	Peter Dul	125	3.28	
Turnout		3,809 (6931)	54.96	
Liberal Democrats gain from Conservative		Swing		
Liberal Democrats gain from Conservative		Swing		
Liberal Democrats gain from Conservative		Swing		

=== Teddington ===
Teddington
Party	Candidate	Votes	%	±%
Liberal Democrats	Martin Elengorn	2,088	58.50	
Liberal Democrats	Stephen Knight	2,046	57.33	
Liberal Democrats	James Mumford	2,036	57.05	
Conservative	Karen Bradley	1,150	32.22	
Conservative	Roger Avins	1,132	31.72	
Conservative	John Wylie	1,041	29.17	
Green	Kevin McMahon	438	12.27	
Labour	Kevin Gilligan	188	5.27	
Labour	Margaret Mills	182	5.10	
Turnout		3,569 (6982)	51.12	
Liberal Democrats hold		Swing		
Liberal Democrats hold		Swing		
Liberal Democrats hold		Swing		

=== Twickenham Riverside ===
Twickenham Riverside
Party	Candidate	Votes	%	±%
Liberal Democrats	Mary Carr	1,838	56.76	
Liberal Democrats	David Trigg	1,728	53.37	
Liberal Democrats	Michael Wilson	1,600	49.41	
Conservative	Joe Broughton	992	30.64	
Conservative	Stuart Leamy	950	29.34	
Conservative	Anatole Pang	855	26.41	
Green	Gillian Thomas	440	13.59	
Green	James Page	392	12.11	
Green	Henry Leveson Gower	321	9.91	
Labour	John Grant	159	4.91	
Labour	Sheila Nixon	141	4.35	
UKIP	Andrew Constantine	106	3.27	
Turnout		3,238 (6713)	48.23	
Liberal Democrats gain from Conservative		Swing		
Liberal Democrats gain from Conservative		Swing		
Liberal Democrats hold		Swing		

=== West Twickenham ===
West Twickenham
Party	Candidate	Votes	%	±%
Liberal Democrats	Piers Allen	1,610	44.61	
Liberal Democrats	Doreen Lee-Parsons	1,524	42.23	
Liberal Democrats	Munira Hassam	1,497	41.48	
Conservative	Lance Quantril	1,403	38.88	
Conservative	James Duckenfield	1,335	36.99	
Conservative	Alan Butler	1,321	36.60	
Labour	Damien Egan	472	13.08	
Labour	Christian Richmond	407	11.28	
Labour	Matthew O'Mullane	402	11.14	
Green	Jonathan Modral	385	10.67	
Turnout		3,609 (6922)	52.14	
Liberal Democrats gain from Conservative		Swing		
Liberal Democrats gain from Conservative		Swing		
Liberal Democrats gain from Conservative		Swing		

=== Whitton ===
Whitton
Party	Candidate	Votes	%	±%
Liberal Democrats	Keith Warren	1,845	52.67	
Liberal Democrats	Sarah Cole	1,842	52.58	
Liberal Democrats	Elizabeth Jaeger	1,774	50.64	
Conservative	Christopher Bligh	1,428	40.77	
Conservative	Nicholas Lait	1,371	39.14	
Conservative	Paul Maynard	1,306	37.28	
Labour	Neil Browning	190	5.42	
Labour	Stephen Guichard	182	5.20	
Labour	Sampson Low	165	4.71	
CPA	Paul Hampartsoumian	65	1.86	
Turnout		3,503 (6474)	54.11	
Liberal Democrats gain from Conservative		Swing		
Liberal Democrats hold		Swing		
Liberal Democrats gain from Conservative		Swing		
