= Geoff Pope =

Geoff Pope or Geoffrey Pope may refer to:

- Geoff Pope (politician) (born 1944), British local politician
- Geoff Pope (American football) (born 1984), American football cornerback
