= 2010 Richmond upon Thames London Borough Council election =

Council elections

Map of the results of the 2010 Richmond upon Thames council election. Conservatives in blue and Liberal Democrats in yellow.

The 2010 election for the London Borough of Richmond upon Thames Council was held on 6 May 2010. The 2010 General Election and other local elections in England took place on the same day.

In London council elections the entire council is elected every four years.

== Results ==
Richmond upon Thames Council election result 2010
Party	Seats	Gains	Losses	Net gain/loss	Seats %	Votes %	Votes	+/−
Conservative	30			+12				
Liberal Democrats	24	0		-11				
Labour	0			0				
Green	0	0	0	0				
UKIP	0	0	0	0				
BNP	0	0	0	0				

== Ward results ==
=== Barnes ===
Barnes
Party	Candidate	Votes	%	±%
Conservative	Rita Palmer	2,964	54.88	
Conservative	Paul Hodgins	2,920	54.06	
Conservative	Christine Percival	2,842	52.62	
Liberal Democrats	James Chard	1,855	34.35	
Liberal Democrats	Andrew Horsler	1,747	32.35	
Liberal Democrats	Silvia Montello	1,743	32.27	
Labour	David Butler	473	8.76	
Labour	Frank Cooper	449	8.31	
Labour	Ann Neimer	438	8.11	
Turnout		5,401	73.2	
Conservative hold		Swing		
Conservative hold		Swing		
Conservative hold		Swing		

=== East Sheen ===
East Sheen
Party	Candidate	Votes	%	±%
Conservative	Nicholas True	3,225	55.29	
Conservative	Virginia Morris	2,974	50.99	
Conservative	Nicola Urquhart	2,971	50.93	
Liberal Democrats	Tom Eisner	2,010	34.46	
Liberal Democrats	Katie Gent	1,839	31.53	
Liberal Democrats	Martin Pierce	1,758	30.14	
Green	Simon Hegarty	713	12.22	
Labour	William Genders	414	7.10	
Labour	Tina Layfield	337	5.78	
Labour	Leonard Griffiths	321	5.50	
Turnout		5,833	78.7	
Conservative hold		Swing		
Conservative hold		Swing		
Conservative hold		Swing		

=== Fulwell & Hampton Hill ===
Fulwell & Hampton Hill
Party	Candidate	Votes	%	±%
Liberal Democrats	Jonathan Cardy	2,658	48.00	
Liberal Democrats	Malcolm Eady	2,617	47.26	
Liberal Democrats	Jerry Elloy	2,511	45.35	
Conservative	Jean Doherty	1,929	34.84	
Conservative	Joanne Hope	1,764	31.86	
Conservative	Sarah Meagher	1,740	31.42	
Green	Monica Saunders	754	13.62	
Labour	Penelope Banaji	552	9.97	
Labour	Sampson Low	546	9.86	
Labour	Sheila Nixon	475	8.58	
Turnout		5,537	73.7	
Liberal Democrats hold		Swing		
Liberal Democrats hold		Swing		
Liberal Democrats hold		Swing		

=== Ham, Petersham & Richmond Riverside ===
Ham, Petersham & Richmond Riverside
Party	Candidate	Votes	%	±%
Liberal Democrats	Susan Jones	2,490	47.47	
Liberal Democrats	Brian Miller	2,183	41.62	
Liberal Democrats	David Williams	2,135	40.71	
Conservative	Mark Brand	2,126	40.53	
Conservative	Sarah Tippett	2,017	38.46	
Conservative	Jean Loveland	2,011	38.34	
Green	Karen Hardy	581	11.08	
Labour	Lynne Hall	424	8.08	
Labour	Daniel Marder	338	6.44	
Labour	Doreen Masters	308	5.87	
UKIP	Peter Dul	231	4.40	
Turnout		5,245	71.8	
Liberal Democrats hold		Swing		
Liberal Democrats hold		Swing		
Liberal Democrats hold		Swing		

=== Hampton ===
Hampton
Party	Candidate	Votes	%	±%
Liberal Democrats	Suzette Nicholson	2,778	49.17	
Liberal Democrats	Janet Langhorne	2,737	48.44	
Liberal Democrats	Gareth Roberts	2,721	48.16	
Conservative	John Soones	2,226	39.40	
Conservative	Jane Boulton	2,180	38.58	
Conservative	Mark Boyle	2,126	37.63	
Labour	Louisa Spawls	482	8.53	
Labour	Lorraine Monk	444	7.86	
Labour	Edward Masters	386	6.83	
Turnout		5,650	75.5	
Liberal Democrats hold		Swing		
Liberal Democrats hold		Swing		
Liberal Democrats hold		Swing		

=== Hampton North ===
Hampton North
Party	Candidate	Votes	%	±%
Liberal Democrats	Ellen Day	2,113	43.25	
Conservative	Geoffrey Samuel	2,016	41.27	
Liberal Democrats	Darren Thornton	1,980	40.53	
Liberal Democrats	Roger Crouch	1,973	40.39	
Conservative	Martin Seymour	1,973	40.39	
Conservative	Kate Howard	1,960	40.12	
Labour	Jane Butters	531	10.87	
Labour	Pamela Lockley	444	9.09	
Labour	Brian Firth	423	8.66	
Green	Edmund Gimzewski	233	4.77	
Turnout		4,885	68.3	
Liberal Democrats gain from Conservative		Swing		
Conservative hold		Swing		
Liberal Democrats gain from Conservative		Swing		

=== Hampton Wick ===
Hampton Wick
Party	Candidate	Votes	%	±%
Conservative	Tony Arbour	2,670	48.67	
Conservative	Gareth Evans	2,321	42.31	
Conservative	Tania Mathias	2,297	41.87	
Liberal Democrats	Jennifer Juriansz	1,956	35.65	
Liberal Democrats	Matthew Wherry	1,908	34.78	
Liberal Democrats	Trevor Whittall	1,672	30.48	
Green	Michael Bangham	831	15.15	
Labour	Jenifer Wyatt	590	10.75	
Labour	Caroline Loewenstein	498	9.08	
Labour	Rebecca Partos	460	8.38	
Turnout		5,486	72.9	
Conservative hold		Swing		
Conservative hold		Swing		
Conservative hold		Swing		

=== Heathfield ===
Heathfield
Party	Candidate	Votes	%	±%
Liberal Democrats	John Coombs	2,338	46.57	
Liberal Democrats	Bill Treble	2,088	41.59	
Conservative	Alan Butler	1,795	35.76	
Conservative	Phillip Taylor	1,792	35.70	
Liberal Democrats	Asad Mahmood	1,763	35.12	
Conservative	Saba Shaukat	1,606	31.99	
Labour	Mark Walker	757	15.08	
Labour	Adam Gladstone	756	15.06	
Labour	Elizabeth Mackenzie	692	13.78	
BNP	John Donnelly	336	6.69	
Turnout		5,020	66.7	
Liberal Democrats hold		Swing		
Liberal Democrats hold		Swing		
Conservative gain from Liberal Democrats		Swing		

=== Kew ===
Kew
Party	Candidate	Votes	%	±%
Conservative	Meena Bond	2,858	45.61	
Liberal Democrats	Jean-Francois Burford	2,767	44.16	
Conservative	David Linnette	2,715	43.33	
Liberal Democrats	Alexander Lourie	2,709	43.23	
Liberal Democrats	George Crozier	2,660	42.45	
Conservative	David Nelson	2,630	41.97	
Labour	Dominic Dalglish	530	8.46	
Labour	James Hurst	477	7.61	
Labour	Gareth James	471	7.52	
Turnout		6,266	77.0	
Conservative gain from Liberal Democrats		Swing		
Liberal Democrats hold		Swing		
Conservative gain from Liberal Democrats		Swing		

=== Mortlake & Barnes Common ===
Mortlake & Barnes Common
Party	Candidate	Votes	%	±%
Conservative	Paul Avon	2,809	47.65	
Conservative	Gemma Stockley	2,685	45.55	
Conservative	Richard Martin	2,554	43.32	
Liberal Democrats	Anna Davies	2,290	38.85	
Liberal Democrats	Merlene Emerson	1,992	33.79	
Liberal Democrats	Richard Pyne	1,738	29.48	
Green	James Page	713	12.09	
Independent	Simon Danciger	558	9.47	
Labour	Ayar Ata	471	7.99	
Labour	Brian Matthews	468	7.94	
Labour	Barnaby Marder	423	7.18	
Turnout		5,895	73.1	
Conservative gain from Liberal Democrats		Swing		
Conservative gain from Liberal Democrats		Swing		
Conservative gain from Liberal Democrats		Swing		

=== North Richmond ===
North Richmond
Party	Candidate	Votes	%	±%
Conservative	Lisa Blakemore	2,624	46.34	
Conservative	Richard Montague	2,531	44.69	
Conservative	Katharine Robinson	2,435	43.00	
Liberal Democrats	Jane Dodds	2,416	42.66	
Liberal Democrats	Celia Hodges	2,396	42.31	
Liberal Democrats	James Bertin	2,267	40.03	
Labour	Pamela Marder	571	10.08	
Labour	John Ward	484	8.55	
Labour	Derek Somers	471	8.32	
Turnout		5,663	72.9	
Conservative gain from Liberal Democrats		Swing		
Conservative gain from Liberal Democrats		Swing		
Conservative gain from Liberal Democrats		Swing		

=== South Richmond ===
South Richmond
Party	Candidate	Votes	%	±%
Conservative	Frances Bouchier	3,000	52.90	
Conservative	Pamela Fleming	2,964	52.27	
Conservative	Thomas O'Malley	2,810	49.55	
Liberal Democrats	David Martin	2,074	36.57	
Liberal Democrats	Morag McKinnon	2,011	35.46	
Liberal Democrats	Tanya Williams	1,994	35.16	
Labour	Stephen Bennett	533	9.40	
Labour	Brian Caton	435	7.67	
Labour	Sam Houston	411	7.25	
Turnout		5,671	72.5	
Conservative hold		Swing		
Conservative hold		Swing		
Conservative hold		Swing		

=== South Twickenham ===
South Twickenham
Party	Candidate	Votes	%	±%
Conservative	Clare Head	2,330	42.66	
Conservative	David Porter	2,326	42.59	
Conservative	David Marlow	2,182	39.95	
Liberal Democrats	Margaret Stevens	2,030	37.17	
Liberal Democrats	Michael Butlin	2,019	36.96	
Liberal Democrats	Steve Topol	1,922	35.19	
Green	Stephen Smith	691	12.65	
Labour	Stephen Guichard	566	10.36	
Labour	Rebecca Maddock	533	9.76	
Independent	John Armstrong	426	7.80	
Labour	Sanjay Sen	403	7.38	
Turnout		5,462	69.5	
Conservative hold		Swing		
Conservative hold		Swing		
Conservative hold		Swing		

=== St Margarets & North Twickenham ===
St Margarets & North Twickenham
Party	Candidate	Votes	%	±%
Liberal Democrats	Geoff Acton	2,631	42.12	
Liberal Democrats	Ben Khosa	2,380	38.10	
Conservative	Chris Harrison	2,366	37.88	
Liberal Democrats	Philip Morgan	2,320	37.14	
Conservative	Morgan Morgan	2,292	36.70	
Conservative	Suzanne Jozefowicz	2,130	34.10	
Green	Judy Maciejowska	660	10.57	
Green	Jenny Andersson	624	9.99	
Independent	Felicity Smart	574	9.19	
Labour	Cheryl Ould	512	8.20	
Green	Carey Roest	503	8.05	
Labour	Pamela Risner	461	7.38	
Labour	Derek Tutchell	358	5.73	
Independent	Rupert Suren	109	1.75	
Turnout		6,246	75.8	
Liberal Democrats hold		Swing		
Liberal Democrats hold		Swing		
Conservative gain from Liberal Democrats		Swing		

=== Teddington ===
Teddington
Party	Candidate	Votes	%	±%
Liberal Democrats	Jennifer Churchill	2,800	48.01	
Liberal Democrats	Martin Elengorn	2,679	45.94	
Liberal Democrats	Stephen Knight	2,655	45.52	
Conservative	Simon Lamb	2,298	39.40	
Conservative	Graeme Tallantire	2,195	37.64	
Conservative	Barry Edwards	2,183	37.43	
Labour	Margaret Mills	619	10.61	
Labour	Michelle Sims	554	9.50	
Labour	Gerard Ward	488	8.37	
Turnout		5,832	75.5	
Liberal Democrats hold		Swing		
Liberal Democrats hold		Swing		
Liberal Democrats hold		Swing		

=== Twickenham Riverside ===
Twickenham Riverside
Party	Candidate	Votes	%	±%
Conservative	Susan Chappell	2,473	44.73	
Conservative	Samantha Salvoni	2,295	41.51	
Conservative	Scott Naylor	2,283	41.29	
Liberal Democrats	Denise Carr	2,206	39.90	
Liberal Democrats	David Trigg	1,949	35.25	
Liberal Democrats	Michael Wilson	1,818	32.88	
Green	Stephen Roest	839	15.17	
Labour	Deborah Lane	646	11.68	
Labour	Lucy MacArthur	583	10.54	
Labour	Colin Pearson	465	8.41	
Turnout		5,529	71.9	
Conservative gain from Liberal Democrats		Swing		
Conservative gain from Liberal Democrats		Swing		
Conservative gain from Liberal Democrats		Swing		

=== West Twickenham ===
West Twickenham
Party	Candidate	Votes	%	±%
Liberal Democrats	Piers Allen	2,586	47.15	
Liberal Democrats	Helen Lee-Parsons	2,550	46.49	
Liberal Democrats	Lesley Pollesche	2,249	41.00	
Conservative	Tony Shoebridge	2,087	38.05	
Conservative	Karen Thurston	2,061	37.58	
Conservative	Nathaniel Ikeazor	1,914	34.90	
Labour	Neil Browning	660	12.03	
Labour	Danny Freeman	634	11.56	
Labour	Eva Tutchell	593	10.81	
Turnout		5,485	71.0	
Liberal Democrats hold		Swing		
Liberal Democrats hold		Swing		
Liberal Democrats hold		Swing		

=== Whitton ===
Whitton
Party	Candidate	Votes	%	±%
Liberal Democrats	Arnie Gibbons	2,071	40.11	
Liberal Democrats	Liz Jaeger	1,999	38.72	
Conservative	Gareth Elliott	1,827	35.39	
Liberal Democrats	Trevor Membery York	1,747	33.84	
Conservative	Roger Hackett	1,599	30.97	
Conservative	Anne Hambidge	1,516	29.36	
Independent	Neil Wilton	687	13.31	
Independent	Keith Warren	600	11.62	
Labour	Jacqueline Morgan	559	10.83	
Independent	Julie Boyle	552	10.69	
Labour	Howard Marchant	523	10.13	
Labour	Martha Mackenzie	491	9.51	
BNP	Chris Hurst	264	5.11	
Turnout		5,163	72.7	
Liberal Democrats hold		Swing		
Liberal Democrats hold		Swing		
Conservative gain from Liberal Democrats		Swing		
