= Jennette Arnold =

British politician (born 1949)

Jennette Arnold OBE
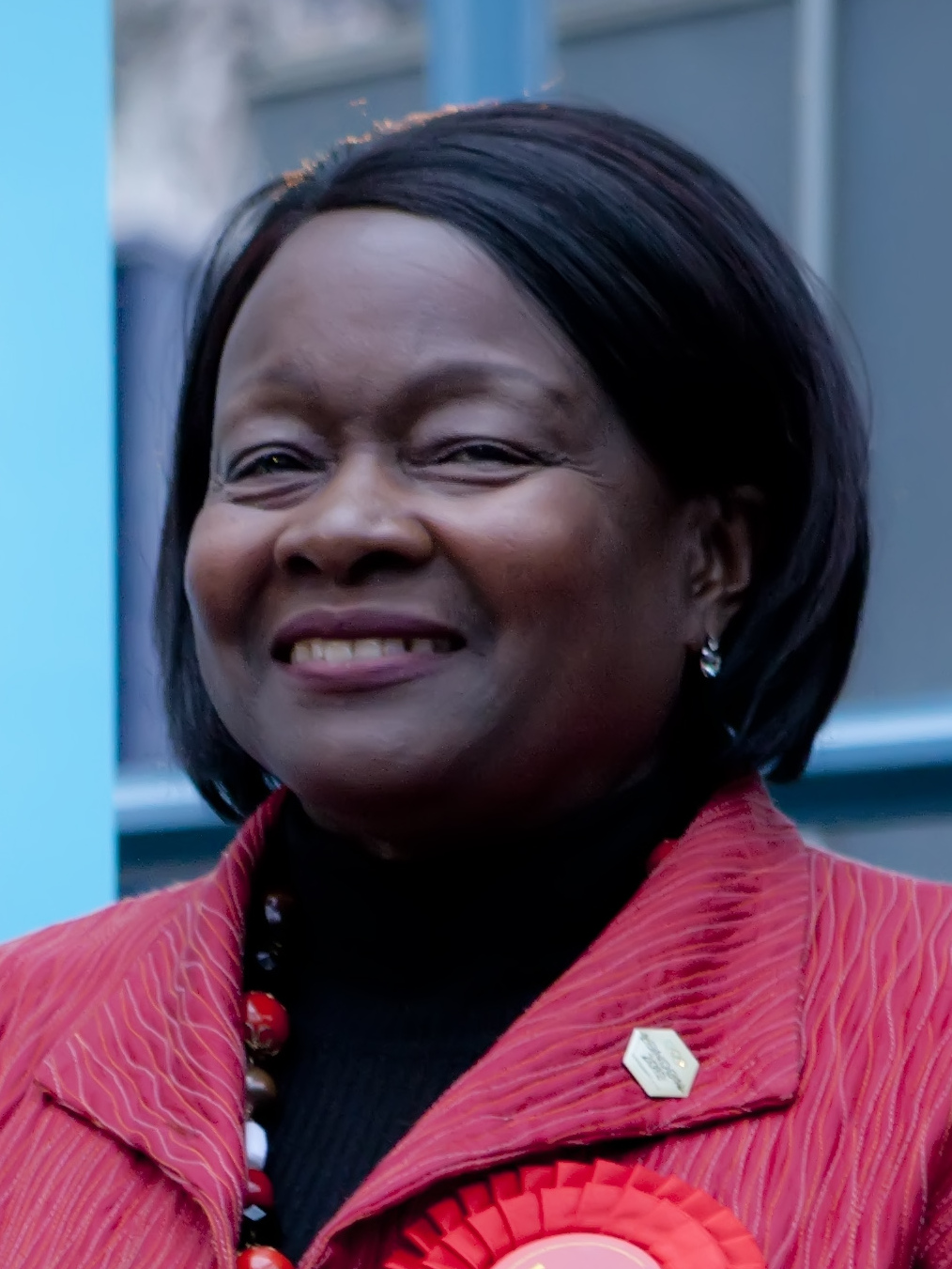
- Arnold in 2012

Chair of the London Assembly
- In office 2 May 2019 – 15 May 2020
- Preceded by: Tony Arbour
- Succeeded by: Navin Shah
- In office 3 May 2017 – 10 May 2018
- Preceded by: Tony Arbour
- Succeeded by: Tony Arbour
- In office May 2015 – May 2016
- Preceded by: Roger Evans
- Succeeded by: Tony Arbour
- In office May 2011 – May 2013
- Preceded by: Dee Doocey
- Succeeded by: Darren Johnson
- In office May 2008 – May 2009
- Preceded by: Sally Hamwee
- Succeeded by: Darren Johnson

Member of the London Assembly for North East
- In office 10 June 2004 – 8 May 2021
- Preceded by: Meg Hillier
- Succeeded by: Sem Moema

Member of the London Assembly as an additional member
- In office 4 July 2000 – 10 June 2004
- Preceded by: David Lammy
- Succeeded by: Nicky Gavron

Personal details
- Born: Montserrat
- Party: Labour Co-op

Jennette Arnold, OBE is a Labour Co-op politician who served as chair of the London Assembly for five terms. From 2004 to 2021, Arnold represented the North East constituency, comprising the London Boroughs of Hackney, Islington and Waltham Forest.

== Background ==
Born in Montserrat, Arnold trained as a nurse. She then worked as an Industrial Relations Officer and as Regional Director of Services and Special Adviser (Equalities) to the General Secretary of the Royal College of Nursing. She then worked as an associate for organisational development consultancy, Beacon Associates.

Arnold was elected to Islington Council in 1998, eventually serving a term as deputy mayor. On the creation of the Greater London Authority in 2000, she was included on Labour's additional members list for the London Assembly, but missed out on a spot. Following the resignation of David Lammy prompted by his election as a Member of Parliament, Arnold as next in line on Labour's list became an additional member of the Assembly in July 2000. She was subsequently selected as Labour's candidate for the North East constituency and elected in the 2004 Assembly election.

Arnold served as Chair of the London Assembly for five terms. She was the London Assembly Labour Group's lead spokesperson on education and Chair of the London Assembly's Education Panel. Arnold previously chaired the Cultural Strategy Group for London, playing a role in bringing the 2012 Olympic and Paralympic Games to London. She has also sat on the Assembly's Economic and Social Development Committee and served as a member of the Metropolitan Police Authority.

During her time in the Assembly, Arnold campaigned on issues including the provision of education for young people with special educational needs and disabilities (SEND) and the improvement of services on the Gospel Oak to Barking line. She also campaigned extensively on the eradication of Female Genital Mutilation (FGM), often citing witnessing a victim of FGM during her time as a student nurse as what prompted her to take action.

In 2007 Arnold was listed by New Nation newspaper as one of Britain's 50 most influential black women.

A member of the UK delegation on the European Committee of the Regions, Arnold is currently: a council member of the Royal Court Theatre; a governor of the Museum of London; a governor of Sadler's Wells Theatre Foundation, a patron of the Victoria Climbie Foundation, and a former Chair of the Stephen Lawrence Charitable Trust.

During the 2015 Labour leadership election Arnold endorsed Jeremy Corbyn.

In January 2019 Arnold announced in a statement to the Assembly that she would not be standing in the 2020 London Assembly election. In May 2020, she stepped down as chair and was replaced by Navin Shah. However, with the deferral of the election by one year due to the COVID-19 pandemic, she continued as an AM until the 2021 London Assembly election.

In 2021, she was awarded the Freedom of the Borough of Islington in 2021.
