= 1964 Richmond upon Thames London Borough Council election =

The 1964 Richmond upon Thames Council election took place on 7 May 1964 to elect members of Richmond upon Thames London Borough Council in London, England. The whole council was up for election and the Conservative Party gained control of the council.

== Background ==
These elections were the first to the newly formed borough. Previously elections had taken place in the Municipal Borough of Barnes, Municipal Borough of Richmond and Municipal Borough of Twickenham. These boroughs were joined to form the new London Borough of Richmond upon Thames by the London Government Act 1963.

A total of 154 candidates stood in the election for the 54 seats being contested across 25 wards. These included a full slate from the Conservative and Labour parties, while the Liberals stood 40 candidates. Other candidates included 3 Communists, 2 Independents and 1 Resident. There were 12 single-seat wards, 10 three-seat wards and 3 four-seat wards.

This election had aldermen as well as directly elected councillors. The Conservatives got 7 aldermen and Labour 2.

The Council was elected in 1964 as a "shadow authority" but did not start operations until 1 April 1965.

== Election result ==
The results saw the Conservatives gain the new council with a majority of 28 after winning 41 of the 54 seats. Overall turnout in the election was 47.5%. This turnout included 750 postal votes.

== Results ==
Party	Votes	Seats	
Conservative Party	29,969 (47.79%)	41 (75.9%)	41 / 54
Labour Party	19,371 (30.89%)	12 (22.2%)	12 / 54
Liberal Party	11,298 (18.02%)	0 (0.0%)	0 / 54
Independent	1,536 (2.45%)	1 (1.9%)	1 / 54
Communist Party	530 (0.85%)	0 (0.0%)	0 / 54

↓
12	1	41
Labour		Conservative

== Ward results ==
=== Barnes ===
Barnes (4)
Party	Candidate	Votes	%	±%
Conservative	Summers I.	2664	56.9	n/a
Conservative	Frederick Denis Christian	2616		−
Conservative	Mason H.	2587		−
Conservative	J B Armstrong	2522		−
Labour	Mostyn J. Ms.	1789	38.2	n/a
Labour	Thompson J.	1774		−
Labour	Whale R.	1719		−
Labour	Hart A.	1679		−
Communist	Banfield A.	229	4.9	n/a
Turnout			46.2	n/a

=== Central Twickenham ===
Central Twickenham (3)
Party	Candidate	Votes	%	±%
Conservative	Child D.	1545	56.1	n/a
Conservative	Griffith P.	1530		−
Conservative	Bell-Wright H. Ms.	1486		−
Labour	Gilbert J.	633	23.0	n/a
Labour	Hughes D.	599		−
Labour	Gourgey P.	593		−
Liberal	Main M.	577	20.9	n/a
Liberal	Cavanna J. Ms.	546		−
Liberal	Studd H.	509		−
Turnout			40.1	n/a

=== East Sheen ===
East Sheen (4)
Party	Candidate	Votes	%	±%
Conservative	Charles Gompels	2710	63.6	n/a
Conservative	Barrows N.	2632		−
Conservative	W F Nation	2621		−
Conservative	Needs G.	2584		−
Liberal	Mann N.	976	22.9	n/a
Liberal	Worth L.	929		−
Liberal	Anthony Stanley Richard Rundle	860		−
Liberal	Armstrong D.	856		−
Labour	Masters E.	576	13.5	n/a
Labour	Neale D.	574		−
Labour	Birch E. Ms.	568		−
Labour	Ward J.	545		−
Turnout			44.6	n/a

=== East Twickenham ===
East Twickenham (3)
Party	Candidate	Votes	%	±%
Conservative	Defries-Porter L.	1588	55.2	n/a
Conservative	Leaney A.	1582		−
Conservative	Gilday-Fox F.	1548		−
Labour	Evans F.	657	22.8	n/a
Labour	Galton Y. Ms.	644		−
Liberal	Davies A. Ms.	634	22.0	n/a
Liberal	Lewis B.	604		−
Liberal	Nunn S.	588		−
Labour	Cunningham G.	569		−
Turnout			38.2	n/a

=== Ham ===
Ham (1)
Party	Candidate	Votes	%	±%
Labour	J H Harwood	773	58.8	n/a
Conservative	Brown B.	542	41.2	n/a
Turnout			49.8	n/a

=== Hampton ===
Hampton (3)
Party	Candidate	Votes	%	±%
Conservative	J W H Crane	2138	50.2	n/a
Conservative	Hall H.	2103		−
Conservative	Hayes S.	2056		−
Liberal	Leahy B.	1103	25.9	N.A
Labour	Robinson W.	1018	23.9	n/a
Labour	Holman C.	1013		−
Labour	Rolfe D.	871		−
Liberal	Cameron D.	849		−
Liberal	Holroyde P. Ms.	568		−
Turnout			51.1	n/a

=== Hampton Hill ===
Hampton Hill (3)
Party	Candidate	Votes	%	±%
Conservative	Watson G.	1835	48.6	n/a
Conservative	Montague William Garrett	1678		−
Conservative	David G Harris	1601		−
Labour	Heath R.	1139	30.2	n/a
Labour	Elmes K.	1092		−
Labour	Watson S. Ms.	908		−
Liberal	Stops B.	798	21.2	n/a
Liberal	Horne D.	665		−
Turnout			48.2	n/a

=== Hampton Wick ===
Hampton Wick (3)
Party	Candidate	Votes	%	±%
Conservative	Wilkins O. Ms.	1904	56.3	n/a
Conservative	Edward Bostock	1904		−
Conservative	Blackmore P.	1800		−
Labour	Heitzmann A.	824	24.4	n/a
Labour	Golding J.	822		−
Labour	Maccullough D.	793		−
Liberal	Bliss E. Ms.	654	19.3	n/a
Liberal	Jones E.	603		−
Liberal	Leighton J.	595		−
Turnout			47.0	n/a

=== Heathfield ===
Heathfield (3)
Party	Candidate	Votes	%	±%
Conservative	Mitchison R.	1295	43.5	n/a
Conservative	Mrs H Champion	1290		−
Conservative	Woodward M. Ms.	1287		−
Labour	Kent B.	914	30.7	n/a
Labour	Gyford J.	908		−
Labour	Thompson B.	892		−
Liberal	Colquhoun I. Ms.	766	25.7	n/a
Liberal	Rebbeck C.	736		−
Liberal	Gowers J.	731		−
Turnout			50.0	n/a

=== Hill ===
Hill (1)
Party	Candidate	Votes	%	±%
Conservative	Robert Arthur James Alcock	414	42.9	n/a
Independent	Landreth D.	329	34.1	n/a
Labour	Tobias J.	221	22.9	n/a
Turnout			54.4	n/a

=== Kew ===
Kew (1)
Party	Candidate	Votes	%	±%
Independent	Pride B.	869	57.5	n/a
Conservative	Slot G.	342	22.6	n/a
Labour	Julia A. Ms.	301	19.9	n/a
Turnout			55.2	n/a

=== Kings ===
Kings (1)
Party	Candidate	Votes	%	±%
Conservative	Hyman Appleby Leon	835	56.4	n/a
Independent	Marin I. Ms.	365	24.6	n/a
Labour	Wood N. Ms.	281	19.0	n/a
Turnout			46.5	n/a

=== Manor ===
Manor (1)
Party	Candidate	Votes	%	±%
Labour	Starr T.	594	63.9	n/a
Conservative	Webb G.	336	36.1	n/a
Turnout			46.6	n/a

=== Mortlake ===
Mortlake (4)
Party	Candidate	Votes	%	±%
Labour	Hutton F.	2335	48.0	n/a
Labour	R H Stevens	2333		−
Labour	Alfred George Henry Lawrance	2299		−
Labour	Whale J.	2187		−
Conservative	Wade S.	1877	38.6	n/a
Conservative	John David F Stow	1776		−
Conservative	F A Counter	1730		−
Conservative	W R Adams	1714		−
Liberal	Parton J.	427	8.8	n/a
Communist	Bowles E.	224	4.6	n/a
Turnout			47.1	n/a

=== North Sheen ===
North Sheen (1)
Party	Candidate	Votes	%	±%
Conservative	Albert Charles McDougall	759	45.9	n/a
Liberal	Hester Margaret Gatty Smallbone	634	38.3	n/a
Labour	Hughes B.	262	15.8	n/a
Turnout			64.0	n/a

=== Park ===
Park (1)
Party	Candidate	Votes	%	±%
Conservative	Morell K.	528	59.2	n/a
Liberal	Moore P.	244	27.4	n/a
Labour	Royle B.	120	13.5	n/a
Turnout			41.2	n/a

=== Petersham ===
Petersham (1)
Party	Candidate	Votes	%	±%
Labour	Smith G. Ms.	727	62.9	n/a
Conservative	McCash J.	429	37.1	n/a
Turnout			50.7	n/a

=== Richmond Central ===
Richmond Central (1)
Party	Candidate	Votes	%	±%
Conservative	Rowe C.	505	50.7	n/a
Labour	Winter J.	272	27.3	n/a
Liberal	Adams R.	220	22.1	n/a
Turnout			41.2	n/a

=== Richmond Green ===
Richmond Green (1)
Party	Candidate	Votes	%	±%
Conservative	Winslow D.	465	56.2	n/a
Liberal	Nemet M. Ms.	276	33.4	n/a
Labour	Caplan M. Ms.	86	10.4	n/a
Turnout			46.7	n/a

=== Selwyn ===
Selwyn (1)
Party	Candidate	Votes	%	±%
Conservative	Tremlett G.	694	50.6	n/a
Labour	McNae A. Ms.	677	49.4	n/a
Turnout			58.1	n/a

=== South Twickenham ===
South Twickenham (3)
Party	Candidate	Votes	%	±%
Conservative	Eslick K.	1908	53.5	n/a
Conservative	James E Woodward	1896		−
Conservative	Lever M. Ms.	1811		−
Labour	Goldring P.	831	23.3	n/a
Labour	Boddy J.	805		−
Labour	Gondris T.	755		−
Liberal	Bisley B.	751	21.1	n/a
Liberal	Bisley D. Ms.	706		−
Liberal	Clements K.	673		−
Communist	Allen J.	77	2.2	n/a
Turnout			47.1	n/a

=== St Luke's ===
St Luke's (1)
Party	Candidate	Votes	%	±%
Labour	Campion E.	590	42.4	n/a
Conservative	L W Miller	571	41.0	n/a
Liberal	Horsbrugh S. Ms.	232	16.7	n/a
Turnout			50.6	n/a

=== Teddington ===
Teddington (3)
Party	Candidate	Votes	%	±%
Conservative	Gold M.	1577	38.7	n/a
Conservative	Garrud C.	1577		−
Labour	Loman G.	1491	36.6	n/a
Conservative	Attwood T.	1489		−
Labour	Wilson E.	1351		−
Labour	Cooke D.	1290		−
Liberal	North T.	1009	24.7	n/a
Liberal	Booth R.	837		−
Liberal	Hart D.	787		−
Turnout			53.7	n/a

=== West Twickenham ===
West Twickenham (3)
Party	Candidate	Votes	%	±%
Labour	Sewell C.	1661	45.4	n/a
Labour	Eldridge E.	1481		−
Labour	Geoffrey James Samuel	1468		−
Conservative	Paskin J.	1129	30.9	n/a
Conservative	L W Newstead	1113		−
Conservative	Chapman F.	1049		−
Liberal	Probert J.	867	23.7	n/a
Liberal	Syrett R.	738		−
Liberal	Vaughan N. Ms.	711		−
Turnout			49.0	n/a

=== Whitton ===
Whitton (3)
Party	Candidate	Votes	%	±%
Conservative	Bernard Bligh	1379	44.4	n/a
Conservative	James A Denham	1335		−
Conservative	Mrs Mary E Owen	1296		−
Liberal	Barnes C.	1130	36.4	n/a
Liberal	Wilfred Percival Letch	993		−
Liberal	Ratcliffe P.	954		−
Labour	Mortimer J.	599	19.3	n/a
Labour	Bryan E.	593		−
Labour	Bach G.	544		−
Turnout			44.2	n/a
