= 1968 Richmond upon Thames London Borough Council election =

The 1968 Richmond upon Thames Council election took place on 9 May 1968 to elect members of Richmond upon Thames London Borough Council in London, England. The whole council was up for election and the Conservative party stayed in overall control of the council.

== Election result ==
Party	Votes		Seats		
Conservative Party	31,769 (59.24%)	▲11.44	54 (100.0%)	54 / 54	▲13
Labour Party	10,758 (20.06%)	▼10.83	0 (0.0%)	0 / 54	▼12
Liberal Party	9,697 (18.08%)	▲0.06	0 (0.0%)	0 / 54	0
Residents Association	1,162 (2.17%)	N/A	0 (0.0%)	0 / 54	N/A
Communist Party	133 (0.25%)	▼0.60	0 (0.0%)	0 / 54	0
Independent	113 (0.21%)	▼2.24	0 (0.0%)	0 / 54	▼1

↓
54
Conservative

== Ward results ==
Barnes (3)
Party	Candidate	Votes	%	±%
Conservative	Armstrong J.	2150	63.6	N/A
Conservative	Raison T.	2126		−
Conservative	Mason H.	2064		−
Labour	Aylett E.	660	19.5	N/A
Labour	Raphael P.	659		−
Labour	Walburn W.	612		−
Liberal	Armstrong D.	569	16.8	N/A
Liberal	Paish A.	470		−
Liberal	Raine G.	469		−
Turnout			44.6	N/A

Central Twickenham (3)
Party	Candidate	Votes	%	±%
Conservative	Bell-Wright H. Ms.	1604	59.0	+2.9
Conservative	Smith D.	1588		−
Conservative	Williams J.	1532		−
Labour	Chamberlain P.	559	20.6	−2.4
Labour	Cunningham M. Ms.	536		−
Labour	Scholefield A.	523		−
Liberal	Marlow R.	442	16.3	−4.6
Independent	Lock J.	113	4.2	N/A
Turnout			39.3	−0.8

East Sheen (3)
Party	Candidate	Votes	%	±%
Conservative	Kramer E.	1786	83.8	N/A
Conservative	Grose S.	1770		−
Conservative	Nation W.	1755		−
Labour	Thompson A.	344	16.2	N/A
Labour	Campion W.	334		−
Labour	Seager G.	302		−
Turnout			35.1	N/A

East Twickenham (3)
Party	Candidate	Votes	%	±%
Conservative	Alexander J. Ms.	1778	63.8	+8.6
Conservative	Gilday-Fox F.	1733		−
Conservative	Leaney A.	1700		−
Labour	Jones W.	516	18.5	−4.3
Liberal	Davies A. Ms.	492	17.7	−2.3
Labour	Gourgey P.	474		−
Labour	Kareh A.	460		−
Liberal	Lewis B.	415		−
Liberal	Nunn S.	386		−
Turnout			40.1	+1.9

Ham & Petersham (3)
Party	Candidate	Votes	%	±%
Conservative	Battle T.	1367	48.7	N/A
Conservative	Arbour A.	1358		−
Conservative	Organ J.	1342		−
Labour	Palmer A.	986	35.1	N/A
Labour	Mostyn J. Ms.	937		−
Labour	Smith G.	931		−
Liberal	Smith M.	454	16.2	N/A
Liberal	Hicks F.	301		−
Liberal	Leighton J.	288		−
Turnout			46.3	N/A

Hampton (3)
Party	Candidate	Votes	%	±%
Conservative	Kenton V.	2462	62.6	+12.4
Conservative	Hall H.	2349		−
Conservative	Lewis H.	2289		−
Liberal	Russell D.	1009	25.7	−0.2
Liberal	Reddrop A.	958		−
Liberal	Weissblatt W.	878		−
Labour	Holman C.	459	11.7	−12.2
Labour	Hyam J. Ms.	386		−
Labour	Gilbert J.	337		−
Turnout			46.2	−4.9

Hampton Hill (3)
Party	Candidate	Votes	%	±%
Conservative	Harris D.	1888	61.4	+12.8
Conservative	Muir J.	1835		−
Conservative	Scott J.	1826		−
Liberal	Henderson P.	603	19.6	−1.6
Labour	Elmes K.	583	19.0	−11.2
Labour	Rosenthal S. Ms.	572		−
Labour	Cooper G.	549		−
Liberal	Twaits J.	543		−
Liberal	Starnes A.	536		−
Turnout			41.5	−6.7

Hampton Wick (3)
Party	Candidate	Votes	%	±%
Conservative	Wilkins O. Ms.	2112	66.6	+10.3
Conservative	Key W.	2051		−
Conservative	Blackmore P.	1932		−
Liberal	Wade M. Ms.	560	17.7	−1.6
Liberal	Brett M. Ms.	508		−
Liberal	D'Souza F.	508		−
Labour	Brown J. Ms.	498	15.7	−8.7
Labour	Heitzmann A.	471		−
Labour	Dunn R.	428		−
Turnout			43.1	−3.9

Heathfield (3)
Party	Candidate	Votes	%	±%
Conservative	Champion H. Ms.	1674	63.3	+19.8
Conservative	Beal M.	1667		−
Conservative	Woodward M. Ms.	1589		−
Labour	Davies H.	684	25.9	−4.8
Labour	Peters D. Ms.	609		−
Labour	Penrose O.	587		−
Liberal	Morrison A.	285	10.8	−14.9
Liberal	Walters M.	265		−
Liberal	Humphrey P.	254		−
Turnout			43.9	−6.1

Kew (3)
Party	Candidate	Votes	%	±%
Conservative	Nugent J.	1711	34.2	N/A
Conservative	Morland R.	1702		−
Conservative	Robinson M.	1663		−
Liberal	Rundle S.	1407	28.2	N/A
Residents	Kerslade R.	1162	23.2	N/A
Residents	Pride B.	1110		−
Liberal	Worth L.	941		−
Liberal	Palmer T.	925		−
Residents	Peters F.	904		−
Labour	Campion E.	718	14.4	N/A
Labour	Dunne W.	683		−
Labour	Kidger D. Ms.	564		−
Turnout			54.9	N/A

Mortlake (3)
Party	Candidate	Votes	%	±%
Conservative	Cooper S. Ms.	1217	44.6	N/A
Conservative	Vince E.	1211		−
Conservative	Isaacson C.	1167		−
Labour	Lawrance A.	1071	39.2	N/A
Labour	Hart A.	1068		−
Labour	Stevens R.	1028		−
Liberal	Drane A.	310	11.4	N/A
Liberal	Tooley M. Ms.	306		−
Liberal	Parton J.	286		−
Communist	Banfield A.	133	4.9	N/A
Turnout			43.7	N/A

Palewell (3)
Party	Candidate	Votes	%	±%
Conservative	Barrow N.	1985	83.0	N/A
Conservative	Wade S.	1980		−
Conservative	Needs G.	1972		−
Labour	Brandon E.	408	17.0	N/A
Labour	Kingsley G.	388		−
Labour	Riedlinger P.	347		−
Turnout			34.2	N/A

Richmond Hill (3)
Party	Candidate	Votes	%	±%
Conservative	Alcock R.	1404	57.4	N/A
Conservative	Thomas A.	1349		−
Conservative	Harston C.	1327		−
Liberal	Nemet M. Ms.	715	29.2	N/A
Liberal	Oddie C.	683		−
Liberal	Dickson D.	670		−
Labour	Gilligan K.	329	13.4	N/A
Labour	Monaghan J.	299		−
Labour	Jupp T.	280		−
Turnout			40.2	N/A

Richmond Town (3)
Party	Candidate	Votes	%	±%
Conservative	Tremlett G.	1694	60.7	N/A
Conservative	Wilton E.	1683		−
Conservative	Winslow D.	1658		−
Labour	Masters E.	650	23.3	N/A
Labour	Winter J.	625		−
Labour	Langford W.	562		−
Liberal	Lee F.	449	16.1	N/A
Liberal	Moore P.	444		−
Liberal	Rippon J.	328		−
Turnout			42.8	N/A

South Twickenham (3)
Party	Candidate	Votes	%	±%
Conservative	Woodward J.	1929	68.4	+14.9
Conservative	Eslick K.	1924		−
Conservative	Lever M. Ms.	1885		−
Labour	Lewis A. Ms.	523	18.5	−4.8
Labour	Park M. Ms.	510		−
Labour	Goldring P.	494		−
Liberal	Brooks C.	369	13.1	−8.0
Liberal	Collins D. Ms.	358		−
Liberal	Collins A.	336		−
Turnout			41.2	−5.9

Teddington (3)
Party	Candidate	Votes	%	±%
Conservative	Gold M.	1771	54.6	+15.9
Conservative	West A.	1726		−
Conservative	Newstead L.	1606		−
Liberal	Newcombe F.	972	30.0	+5.3
Liberal	Hancock J. Ms.	890		−
Liberal	Jacobs H.	831		−
Labour	Grant J.	499	15.4	−21.2
Labour	Schaler H. Ms.	472		−
Labour	Kent B.	466		−
Turnout			46.3	−7.4

West Twickenham (3)
Party	Candidate	Votes	%	±%
Conservative	Warren W.	1541	56.4	+25.5
Conservative	Miller L.	1517		−
Conservative	Muteau C.	1488		−
Labour	Sewell C.	931	34.1	−11.3
Labour	Samuel G.	888		−
Labour	Eldridge E.	833		−
Liberal	Marshall J. Ms.	261	9.5	−14.2
Liberal	Hancock C.	226		−
Liberal	Beardow C.	190		−
Turnout			41.6	−7.4

Whitton (3)
Party	Candidate	Votes	%	±%
Conservative	Bligh B.	1696	59.8	+15.4
Conservative	Owen M. Ms.	1596		−
Conservative	Lambeth J.	1580		−
Liberal	Barnes C.	800	28.2	−8.2
Liberal	Letch W.	689		−
Liberal	Marshall S.	635		−
Labour	Cordingley D.	340	12.0	−7.3
Labour	Murray L.	319		−
Labour	Tutchell E. Ms.	308		−
Turnout			42.2	−2.0
