= Sally Hamwee, Baroness Hamwee =

British politician, life peer (born 1947)

The Right Honourable The Baroness Hamwee
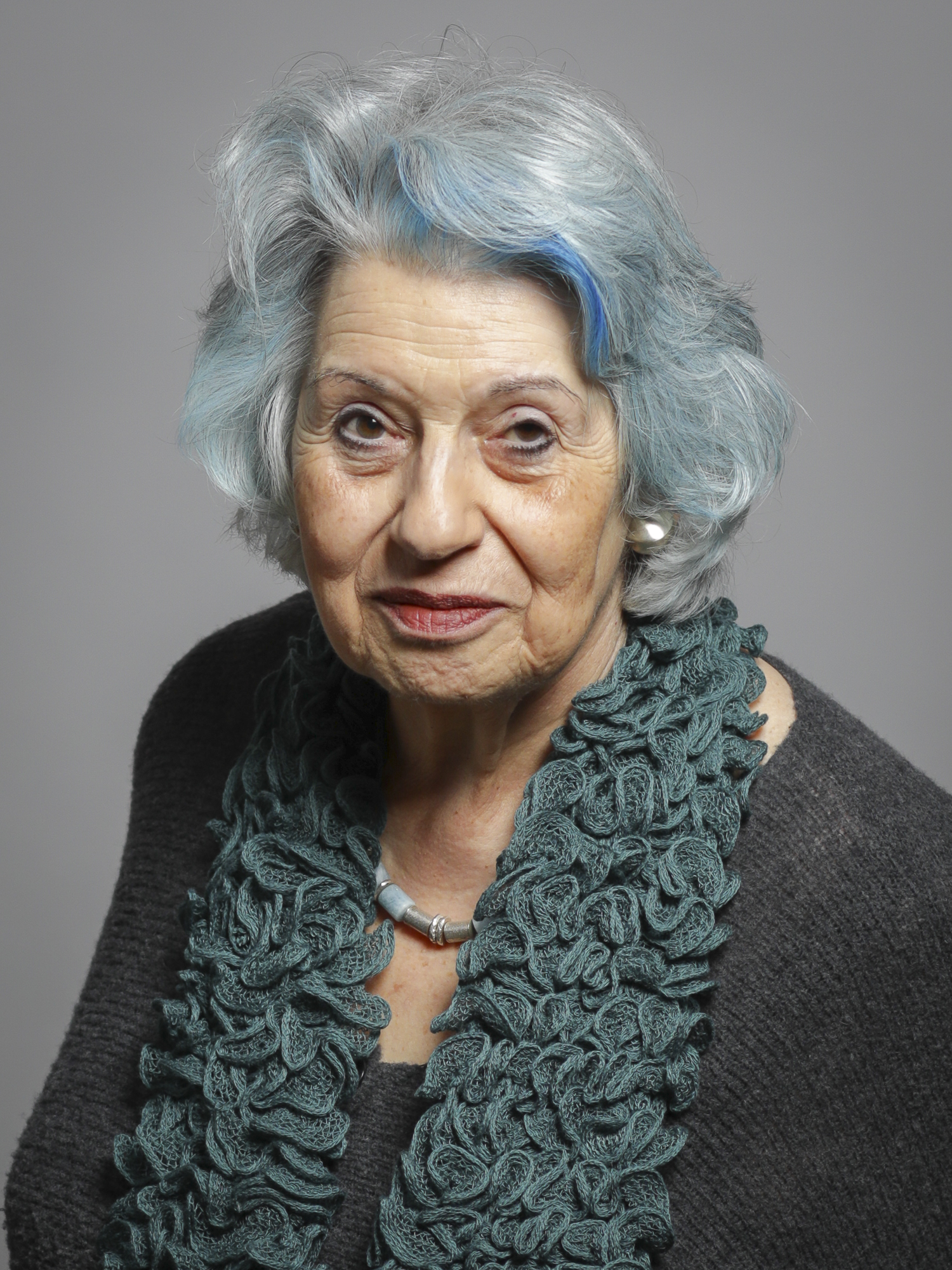

Member of the House of Lords
- Lord Temporal
- Life peerage 6 June 1991

Chair of the London Assembly
- In office May 2007 – May 2008
- Preceded by: Brian Coleman
- Succeeded by: Jennette Arnold
- In office May 2005 – May 2006
- Preceded by: Brian Coleman
- Succeeded by: Brian Coleman
- In office February 2003 – May 2004
- Preceded by: Trevor Phillips
- Succeeded by: Brian Coleman
- In office May 2001 – May 2002
- Preceded by: Trevor Phillips
- Succeeded by: Trevor Phillips

Member of the London Assembly as an additional member
- In office 4 May 2000 – 1 May 2008
- Preceded by: Assembly created
- Succeeded by: Andrew Boff

Personal details
- Born: 12 January 1947 (age 79) England
- Party: Liberal Democrats

Sally Rachel Hamwee, Baroness Hamwee (born 12 January 1947) is a Liberal Democrat politician and their Lead Home Affairs Spokesperson in the House of Lords. She is a Life Peer and former chair of the London Assembly.

== Biography ==
Hamwee was educated at the Manchester High School for Girls, and Girton College, Cambridge, where she studied law. She was a councillor in the London Borough of Richmond upon Thames from 1978 to 1998, as a Liberal until the formation of the Liberal Democrats in 1988, and was made a life peer on 6 June 1991 as Baroness Hamwee, of Richmond upon Thames in the London Borough of Richmond upon Thames.

== London Assembly ==
When the London Assembly was established in 2000, a written agreement with the Labour Party saw Sally Hamwee and Trevor Phillips agreeing to share responsibility for chairing the Assembly in its first term. Trevor Phillips took the Chair in 2000, passing it over to Hamwee in May 2001. Phillips chaired the Assembly from May 2002 to September 2002, but when Trevor Phillips stood down from the Assembly to take up chairmanship of the Commission for Racial Equality, Hamwee stepped in and chaired the Assembly until the June 2004 GLA elections.

The results of those elections saw the Conservative Party and Liberal Democrats enter into a similar agreement as existed between Labour and Lib Dems previously. This agreement resulted in Sally Hamwee chairing the London Assembly between May 2005 and May 2006, and for the final year of this term from May 2007. As part of the agreement, when not chairing the Assembly she chaired the Business Management and Appointments Committee. She stood down from the London Assembly in May 2008.

== House of Lords ==
Hamwee was appointed a Life Peer in 1991. Since April 2021 she has chaired the Justice and Home Affairs Select Committee. Other committees on which she has sat include European Union Select Committee, Joint Committee on Human Rights, EU Justice Sub-Committee, EU Security and Justice Sub-Committee, Central / Local Government Relations Select Committee, Economic Affairs Select Committee and Secondary Legislation Scrutiny Committee. She has also sat on committees examining adoption legislation, the Inquiries Act 2005 and the Inheritance and Trustees’ Powers Bill.

She was the Liberal Democrat spokesperson in the Lords on Home Affairs 2009-2021, spokesperson on Immigration 2017-2021 and spokesperson on Local Government (Local Government; Environment, Transport and Regions; Communities and Local Government) 1991-2009.

== Other public and third sector roles ==
Hamwee has been a Trustee of Safer London – which aims to give young people the opportunity to live free from exposure to gangs, exploitation and crime – since 2014. She is also on the advisory board of Missing People, a Patron of PAC-UK post-adoption services and a Vice-President of the Town and Country Planning Association.

Previous positions include Trustee of the Rose Theatre Kingston, Chair of Refuge domestic violence charity, President of the Town and Country Planning Association, Vice-President of the Chartered Institute of Environmental Health, board member of Parents for Children adoption agency and legal adviser to The Simon Community homelessness charity.

== Legal career ==
Hamwee was admitted as a solicitor in 1972 and was a Partner at Clintons solicitors in London 1984-2000, specialising in media and entertainment law.
