= Geoff Pope (politician) =

British politician (born 1944)

Member of the London Assembly as an additional member
- In office 6 June 2005 – 1 May 2008
- Preceded by: Lynne Featherstone
- Succeeded by: Caroline Pidgeon

Personal details
- Born: 9 April 1944 (age 82)
- Party: Liberal Democrats (UK)

Geoffrey Robert Pope (born 1944) is a Liberal Democrat politician in the United Kingdom.

== Career ==
Pope works as a management consultant in the voluntary sector and was a councillor in the London Borough of Richmond upon Thames, where he was Mayor in 1989–1990 and chair of Social Services. He took his seat on the London Assembly on 6 June 2005 replacing Lynne Featherstone who stepped down in order to concentrate on her work as a newly elected MP. Pope lost his seat at the 2008 election.

In May 2006, he became chair of the London Assembly's Transport Committee. Pope also sat on the Assembly's Health Committee and was a member of the London Fire and Emergency Planning Authority.
