= David Blomfield =

English politician and local historian

David Blomfield MBE
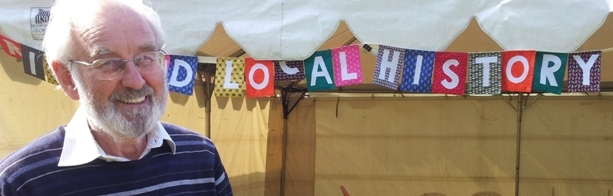
- David Blomfield in 2015, at the Richmond May Fair
- Born: 11 July 1934; Camberley, Surrey, England
- Died: 12 July 2016 (aged 82); Kew, London Borough of Richmond upon Thames, England
- Resting place: Richmond Cemetery
- Education: Wellington College; University of Oxford (MA in Classics); Kingston University (PhD in History)
- Occupations: book editor, writer, local councillor, community representative and local historian
- Spouse: Caroline
- Children: 3
- Writing career
- Notable awards: Member of the Order of the British Empire 2000

David Guy Blomfield MBE (11 July 1934 – 12 July 2016) was leader of the Liberal Party group on Richmond upon Thames Council, a writer, a book editor and a local historian.

== Early life and education ==
David Blomfield was born in Camberley, Surrey. His parents were Valentine Blomfield, a British Army officer, and his wife, Gladys (née Lang), who had been a Voluntary Aid Detachment nurse at Richmond's Star and Garter Home in the First World War. His father's family was descended from the Anglican bishops Charles James Blomfield and Alfred Blomfield and the architect Sir Reginald Blomfield.

He was educated at Wellington College, Berkshire and served in the Royal Artillery and the Oxfordshire Yeomanry. He studied classics at Hertford College, Oxford University and graduated in 1955.

== Career ==
Blomfield worked in the condensed books department of Reader's Digest from 1959 to 1987 and subsequently became a freelance book editor.

He was elected to represent Kew ward on Richmond upon Thames Council from 1971 to 1978 and then from 1979 to 1986. As leader of the Liberal group he was Leader of the Opposition on Richmond upon Thames Council in 1978.

Blomfield, who researched, wrote and published books on the history of Kew, chaired the Richmond Local History Society from 2003 to 2013, edited its annual journal Richmond History and succeeded John Cloake in 2015 as the Society's President. He was also a patron of the Kew Society and a past chairman of the Orange Tree Theatre in Richmond.

== Honours and awards ==
He was appointed Member of the Order of the British Empire in 2000.

== Personal life ==
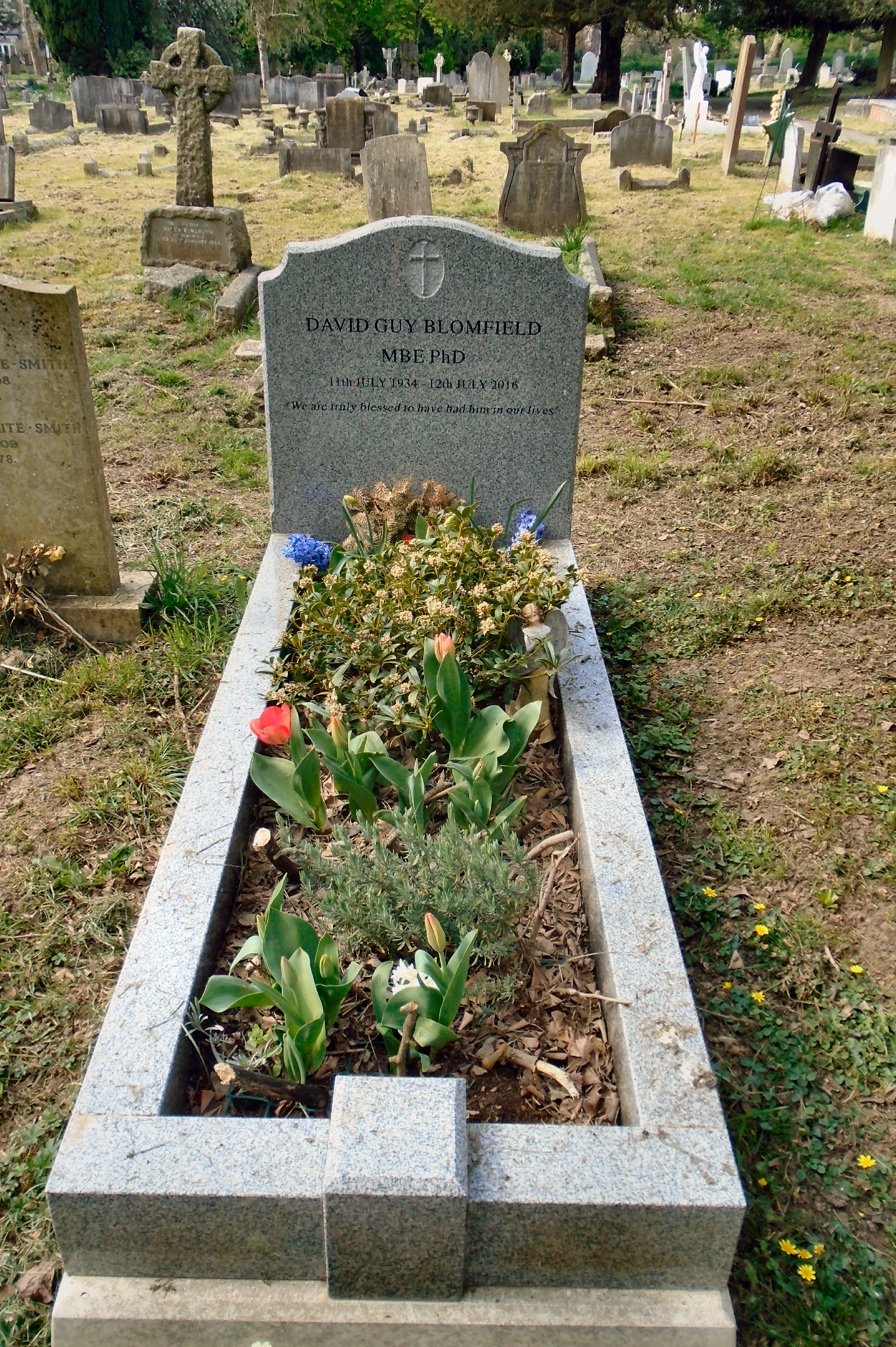
David Blomfield's grave at Richmond Cemetery

He lived in Kew, London with his wife Caroline, with whom he had three children (two sons and a daughter). He died on 12 July 2016, a day after celebrating his 82nd birthday.

== Publications ==
=== Books ===
- Blomfield, David (ed.) (1992). Lahore to Lucknow: The Indian Mutiny Journal of Arthur Moffat Lang. Pen & Sword Books Ltd. ISBN 978-0850522037
- Blomfield, David (1994), Kew Past. Chichester, Sussex: Phillimore & Co. Ltd. ISBN 0-85033-923-5
- Blomfield, David (2011). The Story of Kew (5th, enlarged, edition). London: Leyborne Publications. ISBN 978-0-9520515-3-4.
- Blomfield, David (2014). St Anne's Kew 1714–2014. London: R J L Smith & Associates. ISBN 978-0-9573492-8-5.
- Blomfield, David; Blomfield, Caroline (2015). The Story of Leyborne Park. London: Leyborne Publications. ISBN 978-1-51925427-6.
- Blomfield, David (2015). Oxfordshire Yeomanry Gunners 1922–1967. Bicester: Oxfordshire Yeomanry Trust. ISBN 978-1-32640826-8.
- Blomfield, David; May, Christopher (2016). Kew at War 1939–1945 (3rd, enlarged, edition). London: Richmond Local History Society. ISBN 978-0-9550717-4-4.

=== Articles ===
- Blomfield, David (2000). "The Watermen of Kew". Richmond History: Journal of the Richmond Local History Society. 21: 19–28. ISSN 0263-0958.
- Blomfield, David (2002). "The Modest Champion Oarsman from Kew". Richmond History: Journal of the Richmond Local History Society. 23: 27–32. ISSN 0263-0958.
- Blomfield, David (2005). "The Chittys – a Boatman's Family". Richmond History: Journal of the Richmond Local History Society. 26: 51–61. ISSN 0263-0958.
- Blomfield, David (2008). "Kew Riverside 1820–1920". Richmond History: Journal of the Richmond Local History Society. 29: 27–32. ISSN 0263-0958.
- Blomfield, David (2014). "Queen Anne's Little Church". Richmond History: Journal of the Richmond Local History Society. 35: 18–24. ISSN 0263-0958.
- Blomfield, David (2015). "Christopher May (1944–2014): The Unorthodox Historian". Richmond History: Journal of the Richmond Local History Society. 36: 91–92. ISSN 0263-0958.

=== PhD thesis ===
- Blomfield, David (2006). Tradesmen of the Thames: success and failure among the watermen and lighter men families of the upper tidal Thames 1750–1901 (PDF) (PhD thesis). London: Kingston University.
