= David Williams (Richmond upon Thames politician) =

British politician

Sir David Williams
- Born: 8 June 1939 (age 87)
- Spouse: Christine
- Awards: Commander of the Order of the British Empire 1990; Knight Bachelor 1999

Sir David Reeve Williams CBE (born 8 June 1939) is a British politician and former Leader of Richmond upon Thames Council, where he was a local government councillor for forty years. In July 2017 he was presented with the Freedom of the London Borough of Richmond upon Thames.

== Early life ==
Williams studied at Durham University, graduating with a Bachelor of Arts degree in Politics and Economics. After university he worked as a systems analyst for IBM from 1961 until 1970.

== Political career ==
A member of the Liberal Democrats, Williams was a local government councillor for Ham, Petersham and Richmond Riverside from 1974 to 2014. He was Leader of Richmond upon Thames Council from 1983 to 2001.

== Honours and awards ==
He was appointed Commander of the Order of the British Empire in 1990 and was knighted in the 1999 Birthday Honours for services to local government and to the Local Government Association.

== Personal life ==
He lives in Petersham, London with his wife Christine.

== Publications ==
- Williams, David (2016). "The Rise of the Liberals". Richmond History: Journal of the Richmond Local History Society. 37: 70–79. ISSN 0263-0958.
- Williams, David (2017). "Political change in Richmond-upon-Thames 1983–1986". Richmond History: Journal of the Richmond Local History Society. 38: 80–88. ISSN 0263-0958.
