= Tony Arbour =

British Conservative Party politician

Tony Arbour OBE JP
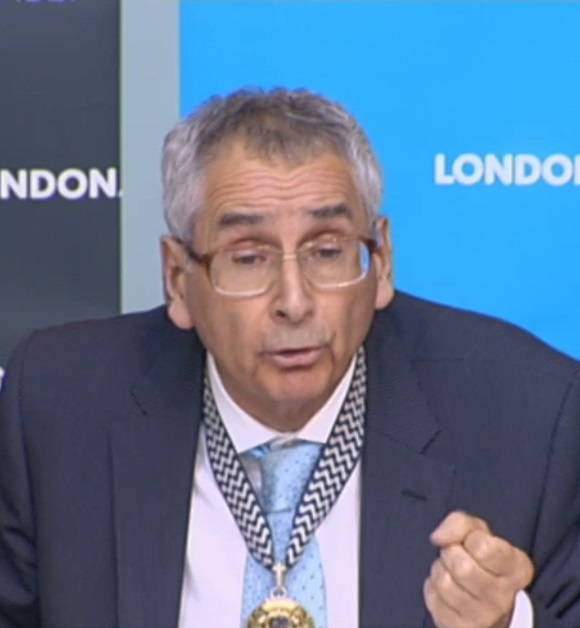
- Arbour in 2018

Chair of the London Assembly
- In office 6 May 2016 – 3 May 2017
- Preceded by: Jennette Arnold
- Succeeded by: Jennette Arnold
- In office 10 May 2018 – 2 May 2019
- Preceded by: Jennette Arnold
- Succeeded by: Jennette Arnold

Member of the London Assembly for South West
- In office 4 May 2000 – 8 May 2021
- Preceded by: New constituency
- Succeeded by: Nicholas Rogers
- Majority: 19,262

Personal details
- Born: 30 August 1945 (age 81)
- Party: Conservative

Anthony Francis Arbour OBE JP (born 30 August 1945) is a British Conservative Party politician. From 2000 until his retirement in 2021, he was a member of the London Assembly representing South West London and is a former Richmond councillor.

He was educated at St Andrew's School and Surbiton County Grammar School before going to the Kingston College of Technology where he earned a Bachelor of Science degree in economics. He went on to get a Master of Business Administration from City University Business School.

Admitted to Gray's Inn in 1967, he became a lecturer at Kingston Business School, a position he held until his election to the London Assembly in 2000.

He was elected as a Conservative to Richmond upon Thames Borough Council in 1968 at the age of only 22 and served as a councillor until 1986, when he lost his seat. He led the Conservative group on the Council from 1996 to 2006, serving as Leader of the Council from 2002, until the Liberal Democrats led by Serge Lourie regained control in 2006. Following the results of the 2018 local elections, he lost his seat once again.

He was a GLC councillor for Surbiton from 1983 to 1986 and was first elected to the London Assembly in 2000 with 35.4% of the ballot and a majority of 7,059 votes. He was re-elected in 2004 with a majority of 4,067, in 2008 with a majority of 26,928, in 2012 with a majority of 19,262, and in 2016 with a majority of 21,444 votes.

He was a member of the Metropolitan Police Authority and has served as a Justice of the Peace since 1974.
