= Eveline Cruickshanks =

British historian (1926–2021)

- Born: 1 December 1926
- Died: 14 November 2021 (aged 94)

Academic work
- Discipline: British political history
- Sub-discipline: Jacobitism; Toryism

Eveline Cruickshanks (1 December 1926 – 14 November 2021) was a historian of seventeenth- and eighteenth-century British political history, specialising in Jacobitism and Toryism. She was of English, Scottish and French descent. She was an Honorary Fellow of the Institute of Historical Research of the University of London.

Cruickshanks edited the volumes of the History of Parliament for the years 1690–1715 and wrote all of the major biographies of Tory parliamentarians for the volumes covering 1715–1754, edited by Romney Sedgwick. J. C. D. Clark has spoken of Cruickshanks' "pioneering work on the Tories" and has argued: "What made Sedgwick's volumes explosive was Dr Cruickshanks' argument, which made it impossible so to brush Tory survival aside: that the Tories were heavily involved, at different times, with Jacobitism and that the latter was a powerful and lasting force in politics".

She published The Glorious Revolution in 2000 (Palgrave-Macmillan). Toryism and Jacobitism in the late seventeenth and eighteenth century was her special interest and she edited several volumes of essays on the subject. The Atterbury Plot written with the late Professor Howard Erskine-Hill published in 2004 was the first full scale study of this subject.

She was Chairman of the Jacobite Studies Trust, a registered Charity, whose first conference was held at the British Academy on 11–12 July 2007. She was Chairman then Vice-President of the Royal Stuart Society.

== Works ==
- Political Untouchables; The Tories and the '45 (Duckworth 1979).
- By Force or By Default? The Revolution of 1688-89 (1989).
- The Glorious Revolution (2000).
- The Atterbury Plot (with Professor Howard Erskine-Hill, 2004).
