= The History of Parliament =

Project to write a history

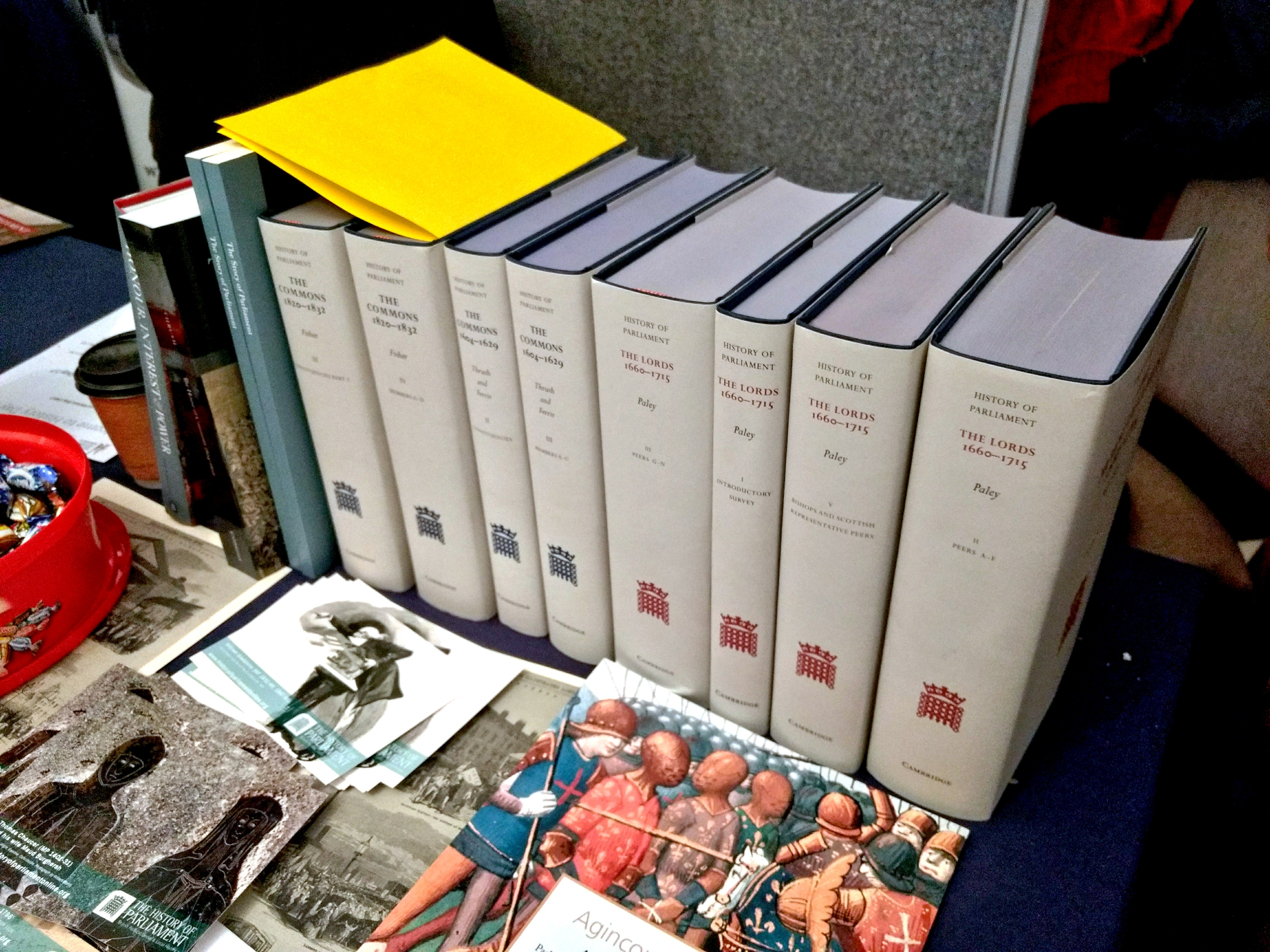
History of Parliament volumes

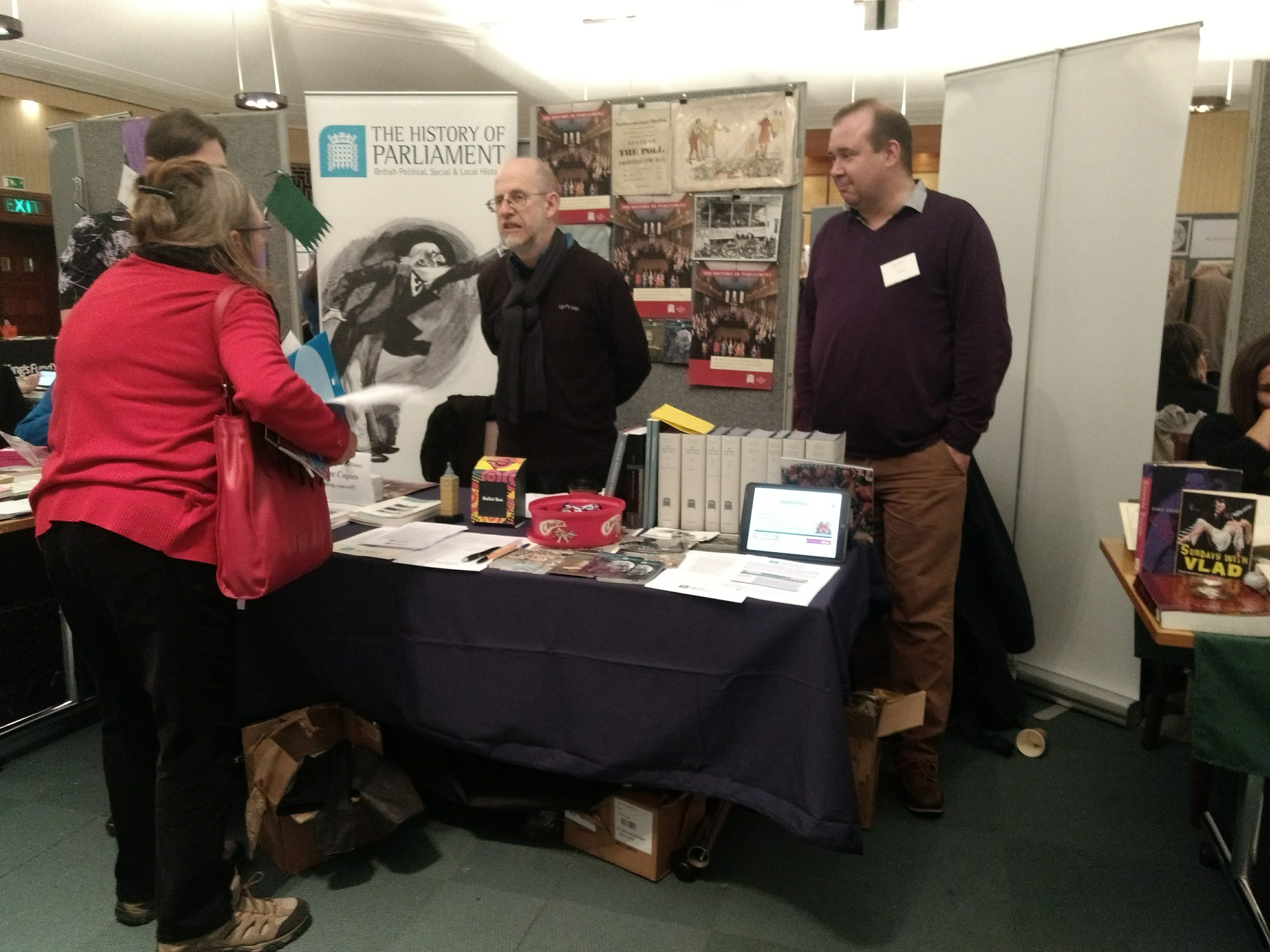
The History of Parliament at the University of London School of Advanced Study History Day, October 2017

The History of Parliament is a project to write a complete history of the United Kingdom Parliament and its predecessors, the Parliament of Great Britain and the Parliament of England. The history will principally consist of a prosopography, in which the history of an institution is told through the individual biographies of its members. After various amateur efforts, the project was formally launched in 1940, and since 1951 has been funded by the Treasury. As of 2019, the volumes covering the House of Commons for the periods 1386–1421, 1509–1629, and 1660–1832 have been completed and published (in 41 separate volumes containing over 20 million words); and the first five volumes covering the House of Lords from 1660 to 1715 have been published, with further work on the Commons and the Lords ongoing. In 2011 the completed sections were republished on the internet.

== History ==
The publication in 1878–79 of the Official Return of Members of Parliament, an incomplete list of the name of every member elected to serve in lower houses of parliaments in the United Kingdom and predecessor states, gave a useful source on which Victorian historians could build, and there were several publications which identified and gave some biographical and genealogical details of the Members of Parliament for certain constituencies. Among those writing histories was Josiah Wedgwood, who was himself Member of Parliament for Newcastle-under-Lyme from 1906. In 1918–1922 Wedgwood published the Staffordshire Parliamentary History.

In 1928, Wedgwood decided to take the subject further. Together with other MPs who were interested in the subject, he wrote a memorial to the Prime Minister urging him to appoint a committee to prepare a complete record of the personnel of every parliament since 1264. The memorial noted that the Official Return was incomplete and inaccurate, and contained no information beyond a list of names; it attempted to head off Treasury objections to the cost, by pointing to the fact that pledges of voluntary assistance had been obtained. Wedgwood quickly obtained the signatures of more than 200 MPs. On 17 July 414 had signed, together with a number of members of the House of Lords, and a delegation saw Prime Minister Baldwin who was again wary of the cost; the delegation insisted that the question of publication need not be considered until the availability of material was assessed. Baldwin agreed to take the matter under consideration. The result of the pressure was that Baldwin announced in December (by which time 512 MPs were on board) that the Government agreed to appoint a Select Committee to report on materials available to write such a history.

The committee so formed in March 1929 included academics as well as politicians, and it soon became riven by ferocious differences about the nature of the project with Wedgwood's romanticism alienating most of the historians. The interim report of the Committee, covering 1264 to 1832, was published in September 1932 in the run-up to the centenary of the Reform Act and gave a guide to the information available. The project then ran into funding difficulties given the economic situation in the 1930s, and no future reports were issued by the Committee. Wedgwood then undertook fundraising and worked with a small group of assistants, completing in 1936 and 1938 two volumes entitled The History of Parliament 1439–1509. He took advantage of the one remaining offer of government help and the books were published by His Majesty's Stationery Office.

In 1940, the History of Parliament Trust was established to foster future volumes and arrange for their publication. However, the Second World War and Wedgwood's death in 1943 meant that the project went into abeyance. At the end of the war, strenuous lobbying by L. B. Namier who had been a member of the 1930s committee succeeded in getting agreement by the Treasury to provide funding for the History of Parliament Trust. Namier was Professor of History at the University of Manchester. The initial grant was for not more than £17,000 a year, and for 20 years, during which it was hoped that the whole period could be completed. Sir Frank Stenton became the first chairman of the editorial board.

== Approach ==
The historian David Cannadine, in the History of Parliament Trust's 2006 annual lecture on 21 November 2006, noted that while Wedgwood and Namier are predominantly responsible for the foundation of the History, they were quite contrasting characters (Wedgwood a gregarious and high-spirited English aristocrat of advanced Liberal views, Namier a Polish Jew who was joyless and a strong Tory). Despite working together on the Committee on House of Commons Personnel and Politics, they had quite different inspirations to take up the subject of parliamentary history. Wedgwood looked on the history of Parliament as a member of the classic Whig school of history: as a romantic story of the spread of freedom and liberty to people of all backgrounds. Namier regarded such views as fashionable nonsense and was especially interested in the personalities of Parliament; he obsessed over the single question of why its members had decided to go into Parliament.

== Organisation ==
Once the History of Parliament Trust started looking into the scope of its work, it quite rapidly realised the enormity of the task before it. Namier was critical of the quality of Wedgwood's work and so his period of 1439–1509 was included to be rewritten from the start. The History was initially divided into 15 sections, but by 1956 even this was impossible and they were reduced to six. For a decade, Namier himself worked nine hours a day at the Institute of Historical Research to write biographies of eighteenth-century Members of Parliament, with three paid assistants and other volunteers. Although Namier died in 1960, the first volumes of the History to be published in April 1964 carried his name along with that of his colleague John Brooke and covered the years 1754–1790.

The format of the first three volume set established the standard for all others. It began with an introductory survey (written by Brooke) which explained the period and provided some statistical analysis of the Members as a whole. There followed articles about each constituency which gave the results of elections and explained the influences at work. Volumes two and three gave biographies of each of the 1,964 men who sat in Parliament at any point in the period; where the Members concerned had served before the period or continued serving after, the biographies covered solely their activities within the period; they also concentrated entirely on Parliamentary activity and mentioned the other lives of Members only briefly.

== Volumes published ==
The next volume to appear after 1754–1790 was the preceding period, 1715–1754, published in two volumes in 1970 and edited by Romney Sedgwick. Although the twenty-year agreement with the Treasury expired in 1971, funding was continued, and work continued through the 1970s. The early 1980s saw three sections completed. Peter Hasler had taken over the section dealing with 1558–1603 after the death of Professor J. E. Neale, and it was published in 1981. Professor S. T. Bindoff's section for 1509–1558 was published in 1982 shortly after his death in December 1980; Bindoff's death meant he was unable to write the usual introductory survey volume and the section appeared without it. In 1983, Basil Duke Henning's section on the History of Parliament in 1660–1690 was published.

The next section to appear was that for 1790–1820, which had originally been the work of Professor Arthur Aspinall before his death in 1972, and had been taken over by R. G. Thorne afterwards up to publication in 1986. Six years passed before the next section appeared, being the first volumes covering Parliament in the Middle Ages. Professor J. S. Roskell, Linda Clark and Carole Rawcliffe were jointly responsible for the section covering 1386–1421. By the mid-1990s many libraries and users of the History were struggling to cope with the 23 large volumes, and there had been new historical discoveries leading to revisions in the biographies of some Members included in previous volumes. In 1998 the History arranged for the republication, with corrections and revisions and some additional images, of all previous sections on a single CD-ROM.

In the 21st century there were three sections published: David Hayton, Eveline Cruickshanks and Stuart Handley completed their work on the period 1690–1715 in 2002, the seven-volume History of Parliament 1820–1832 was published in December 2009, and a seven volume set covering the period 1422–1461 was published in 2020.

== Volumes in preparation ==
According to the official blog, Commons 1422–1504, Commons 1640–1660, Commons 1832–1868, Lords 1604–29 and Lords 1715–1790 are all currently underway. The History of Parliament Trust previously estimated that the 1640–1660 edition edited by Stephen Roberts would be published in 2016, which was later revised to 2020.

The period 1422–1504, under the direction of Linda Clark, will be published in two sections split in 1461, the first of these sections was published in 2020. Work on the period since 1832 began only in 2009, under the direction of Philip Salmon. The Lords 1715–1790 is the second in a trio of sets exploring the House of Lords from 1660 – 1832, with the first set published in 2016.

== House of Lords ==
The History had not originally looked at the House of Lords, but in April 1999 launched a project under Ruth Paley to produce a comprehensive account of its history. The first five-volume set (an introductory volume and four volumes of biographies), covering the period 1660–1832, was published in 2016.

== History of Parliament Online ==
The History of Parliament Online website is a project of the Institute of Historical Research at the School of Advanced Study, University of London.

== Reception ==
The first appearance of the History in 1964 occasioned many reviews. The Times Literary Supplement review (anonymous but by J. P. Carswell) described the books as "magnificent", but some reviewers were animated by their own feuds with Namier and felt that the books had been limited by their determination to profile MPs individually rather than collectively. A. J. P. Taylor was the most quoted critic, writing in The Observer that the books were not a history but undigested raw material for one, and that many of the MPs profiled were of no importance in their own day. The 1715–1754 section was praised by J. C. D. Clark, who wrote of "Cruickshanks' pioneering work on the Tories" that demonstrated that the Tory party survived well into the eighteenth century and was heavily involved in Jacobitism. The introductory surveys to the 1558–1603 and 1660–1690 sections were criticised for being too brief. However, the more recent publications of 1790–1820, 1386–1421 and 1690–1715 (which have been longer) have been widely praised.

== Other work associated with the history ==
The primary source material for Parliament's activities were needed for the History and in the 21st century the History has been keen to digitise them for its own use and for access by others. The History of Parliament has a joint project with the Institute of Historical Research (IHR), funded by the Andrew W. Mellon Foundation, to digitise the early Journals of the House of Commons and House of Lords, together with other material relating to British history. An 'electronic history of the House of Lords' is an integral part of the research into its history.

The History of Parliament also sponsors an annual lecture given on a topic relating to its work by an academic historian.

In 1934, a committee of Irish historians was formed to plan a history of the pre-1801 Irish Parliament ancillary to the British project. This was abandoned in 1936 due to lack of funds, though some work was later done at the IHR. In 2002 The History of the Irish Parliament 1692–1800 was published in six volumes by the Ulster Historical Foundation, after several decades of intermittent work with occasional public funding. Focused on the Irish House of Commons rather than the Irish House of Lords, it was published online in 2006.

== List of publications ==
=== Short histories of Parliament ===
- 1265–2015] ed. Paul Seaward, The Story of Parliament: Celebrating 750 Years of Parliament in Britain (History of Parliament Trust, London, 2015).

=== House of Commons ===
- 1386–1421 ed. J.S. Roskell, Linda Clark, Carole Rawcliffe, The House of Commons, 1386–1421, 4 vols (Alan Sutton, Stroud, 1992)
  - Vol.1: Introductory survey, appendices, constituencies
  - Vol.2: Members A–D
  - Vol.3: Members E–O
  - Vol.4: Members P–Z
- 1422–1461 ed. Linda Clark The House of Commons, 1422–1461, 7 vols (Cambridge University Press, 2020)
  - Vol.1: Introductory survey, appendices
  - Vol.2: Constituencies
  - Vol.3: Members A–C
  - Vol.4: Members D–H
  - Vol.5: Members I–O
  - Vol.6: Members P–S
  - Vol.7: Members T–Z
- 1461–1504 In preparation, under the direction of Hannes Kleineke
- 1509–1558 ed. S. T. Bindoff, The House of Commons, 1509–1558, 3 vols (Secker & Warburg, London, 1982)
  - Vol.1: Constituencies, members A–C
  - Vol.2: Members D–M
  - Vol.3: Members N–Z
- 1558–1603 ed. P. W. Hasler, The House of Commons, 1558–1603, 3 vols (Secker & Warburg, London, 1981)
  - Vol.1: Introductory survey, appendices, constituencies, Members A–C
  - Vol.2: Members D–L
  - Vol.3: Members L–Z
- 1604–1629 eds. Andrew Thrush and John P. Ferris, The House of Commons, 1604–1629, 6 vols (Cambridge University Press, Cambridge, 2010)
  - Vol.1: Introductory survey, appendices
  - Vol.2: Constituencies
  - Vol.3: Members A–C
  - Vol.4: Members D–J
  - Vol.5: Members K–Q
  - Vol.6: Members R–Y, appendix
- 1640–1660 In preparation, under the direction of David Scott, Vivienne Larmine and Stephen Roberts.
- 1660–1690 ed. B. D. Henning, The House of Commons, 1660–1690, 3 vols (Secker and Warburg, London, 1983)
  - Vol.1: Introductory survey, appendices, constituencies, members A–B
  - Vol.2: Members C–L
  - Vol.3: Members M–Y
- 1690–1715 eds. Eveline Cruickshanks, Stuart Handley and David Hayton, The House of Commons, 1690–1715, 5 vols (Cambridge University Press, Cambridge, 2002). See also biography of Eveline Cruickshanks.
  - Vol.1: Introductory survey, appendices
  - Vol.2: Constituencies
  - Vol.3: Members A–F
  - Vol.4: Members G–N
  - Vol.5: Members O–Y
- 1715–1754 ed. Romney Sedgwick, The House of Commons, 1715–1754, 2 vols (His Majesty's Stationery Office, London, 1970)
  - Vol.1: Introductory survey, appendices, constituencies, members A–D
  - Vol.2: Members E–Y
- 1754–1790 eds. Lewis Namier and John Brooke, The House of Commons, 1754–1790, 3 vols (Secker & Warburg, London, 1964). See also biography of Lewis Namier.
  - Vol.1: Introductory survey, constituencies, appendices
  - Vol.2: Members A–J
  - Vol.3: Members K–Y
- 1790–1820 ed. R. G. Thorne, The House of Commons, 1790–1820, 5 vols (Secker & Warburg, London, 1986)
  - Vol.1: Introductory survey
  - Vol.2: Constituencies
  - Vol.3: Members A–F
  - Vol.4: Members G–P
  - Vol.5: Members Q–Y
- 1820–1832 ed. D. R. Fisher, The House of Commons, 1820–1832, 7 vols (Cambridge University Press, Cambridge, 2009)
  - Vol.1: Introductory survey, appendices
  - Vol.2: Constituencies, part I: England, Bedfordshire–Somerset
  - Vol.3: Constituencies, part II: England, Staffordshire–Yorkshire and Cinque Ports, Wales, Scotland, Ireland
  - Vol.4: Members A–D
  - Vol.5: Members E–K
  - Vol.6: Members L–R
  - Vol.7: Members S–Y
- 1832–1868 In preparation, under the direction of Philip Salmon and Kathryn Rix.

=== House of Lords ===
- 1604–1629 under the direction of Andrew Thrush
- 1660–1715 ed. Ruth Paley, The House of Lords, 1660–1715, 5 vols (Cambridge University Press, Cambridge, 2016)
  - Vol.1: Introductory survey
  - Vol.2: Peers A-F
  - Vol.3: Peers G-N
  - Vol.4: Peers O-Y
  - Vol.5: Bishops and Scottish Representative Peers
- 1715–1832 In preparation, under the direction of Robin Eagles, will be published in two sections, split in 1790.

Additionally, the Trust has produced the following book, taking a different format to the above volumes:

- Ruth Paley and Paul Seaward, eds., Honour, Interest & Power: An Illustrated History of the House of Lords, 1660–1715 (Boydell & Brewer, London, 2010)

=== Earlier (pre-Trust) versions of the History of Parliament ===
- 1439–1509 ed. Josiah Wedgwood, The History of Parliament, 1439–1509, 2 vols (His Majesty's Stationery Office, London, 1936-8)
  - Vol.1: Biographies of the Members of the Commons House
  - Vol.2: Register of the Ministers and of the Members of both Houses.

== See also ==
- Parliament in the Making
