= Simon Fowler (disambiguation) =

Simon Fowler is the lead vocalist and acoustic guitarist in Ocean Colour Scene.

Simon Fowler may also refer to:

- Simon Fowler (author), social historian
- Simon Fowler (photographer) (born 1954), whose pop photos appeared in Smash Hits magazine
