= Jacobitism =

17th to 18th-century British political ideology

- Scottish Gaelic: Na Seumasaich
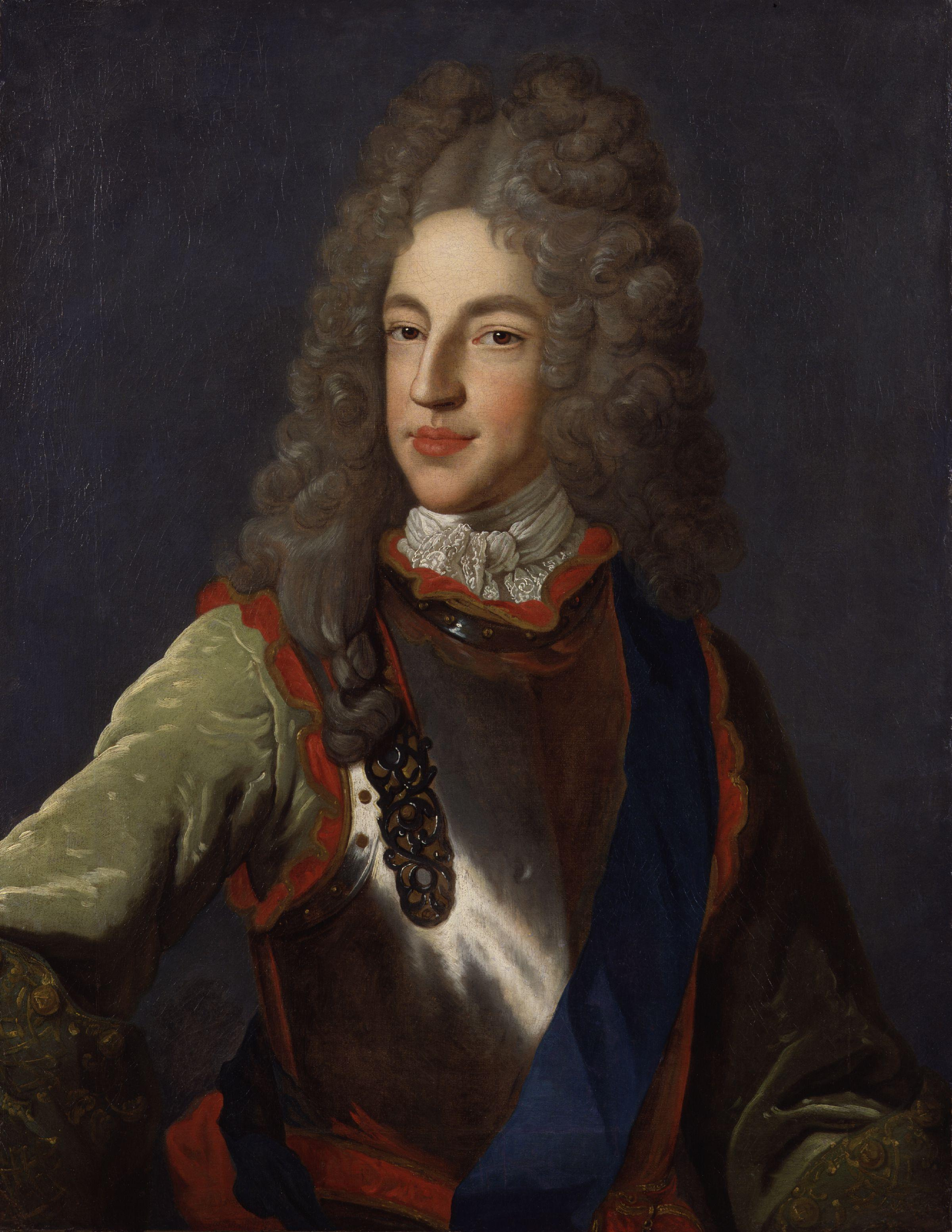
- James Francis Edward Stuart, Jacobite claimant between 1701 and 1766
- Leaders: James II (1688–1701); James Francis Edward Stuart (Note: The "Old Pretender") (1701–1766); Charles Edward Stuart (Note: The "Young Pretender") (1766–1788); Henry Benedict Stuart (1788–1807)
- Military leaders: Tyrconnell; Dundee; Saint-Ruhe; Patrick Sarsfield; Earl of Mar; Thomas Forster; Tullibardine; Lord George Murray; Cameron
- Dates active: 1688–1780s
- Active regions: British Isles
- Ideology: Restoration of the House of Stuart; Indefeasible dynastic right; Divine right of kings; Irish nationalism; Scottish nationalism
- Wars: Jacobite rising of 1689; Williamite War (1689–91); Jacobite rising of 1715–16; Jacobite rising of 1719; Jacobite rising of 1745–46

Jacobitism (Note: /ˈdʒækəbaɪtɪzəm/; Scottish Gaelic: Seumasachas, [ˈʃeːməs̪əxəs̪]; Irish: Seacaibíteachas [ʃakaˈbʲiːtʲəxəsˠ], Séamusachas [ˈʃeːməsˠəxəsˠ]; the term derives from Jacobus, the Latin version of the first name of James II of England, and so its followers, known as Jacobites.) was the name for a political movement active from 1688 to the end of the 18th century. Its primary objective was the restoration of the exiled House of Stuart to the British throne. It was strongest in Ireland, the Western Scottish Highlands, Perthshire, Aberdeenshire, Wales, and Northern England.

In November 1688, the Glorious Revolution replaced James II of England with his daughter Mary II of England, and her husband William III. Jacobites argued that since kings held their office through divine right, the entire post-1688 regime was illegitimate. However, since Jacobitism served as an outlet for popular discontent, it contained a complex mix of ideas, many opposed by the Stuarts themselves.

In addition to the 1689–1691 Williamite War in Ireland and Jacobite rising of 1689 in Scotland, there were serious revolts in 1715, 1719 and 1745, French invasion attempts in 1708 and 1744, and numerous unsuccessful plots. While the 1745 Rising briefly seemed to threaten the Hanoverian monarchy, its defeat in 1746 ended Jacobitism as a serious political movement.

== Political background ==
Jacobite ideology originated with James VI and I, who in 1603 became the first monarch to rule all three kingdoms of England, Scotland and Ireland. Its basis was divine right, which emphasised the crown's descent by hereditary right, and represented an attempt by James to forestall controversy over his appointment by Elizabeth I as her successor. However, his concept of personal rule eliminated the need for Parliaments, and required political and religious union, concepts widely unpopular in all three kingdoms, but especially England.

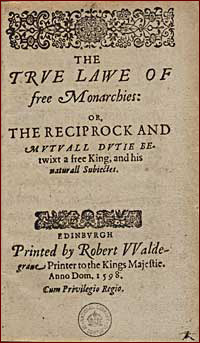
'The True Law of Free Monarchies;' James VI and I's political tract formed the basis of Stuart ideology

As the first step towards union, James began standardising religious practices between the Church of England, Scotland and Ireland. After his death in 1625, this policy was continued by his son Charles I, whose assertion of Personal Rule in 1629 and enforcement of reforms on the Church of England led to a political crisis. Similar measures in Scotland caused the 1639–1640 Bishops' Wars, and installation of a Covenanter government.

This crisis was exacerbated by the October 1641 Irish Rebellion, a response by the Catholic Irish nobility to land confiscation, loss of political control, anti-Catholic measures and economic decline. Intended as a bloodless coup, its leaders quickly lost control, leading to atrocities on both sides. In May, a Covenanter army landed in Ulster to support Scots settlers. Although Charles and Parliament both supported raising an army to suppress the Rebellion, neither trusted the other with its control; these tensions ultimately led to the outbreak of the First English Civil War in August 1642.

In 1642, the Catholic Confederacy representing the Irish insurgents proclaimed allegiance to Charles, but the Stuarts were an unreliable ally, since concessions in Ireland cost them Protestant support in all three kingdoms. In addition, the Adventurers' Act, approved by Charles in March 1642, funded suppression of the revolt by confiscating land from Irish Catholics, much of it owned by members of the Confederacy. The result was a three-way contest between the Confederacy, Royalist forces under the Protestant Duke of Ormond, and a Covenanter-led army in Ulster. The latter were increasingly at odds with the government in London, and after the Execution of Charles I in January 1649, Ormond combined these factions to resist the 1649-to-1652 Cromwellian conquest of Ireland.

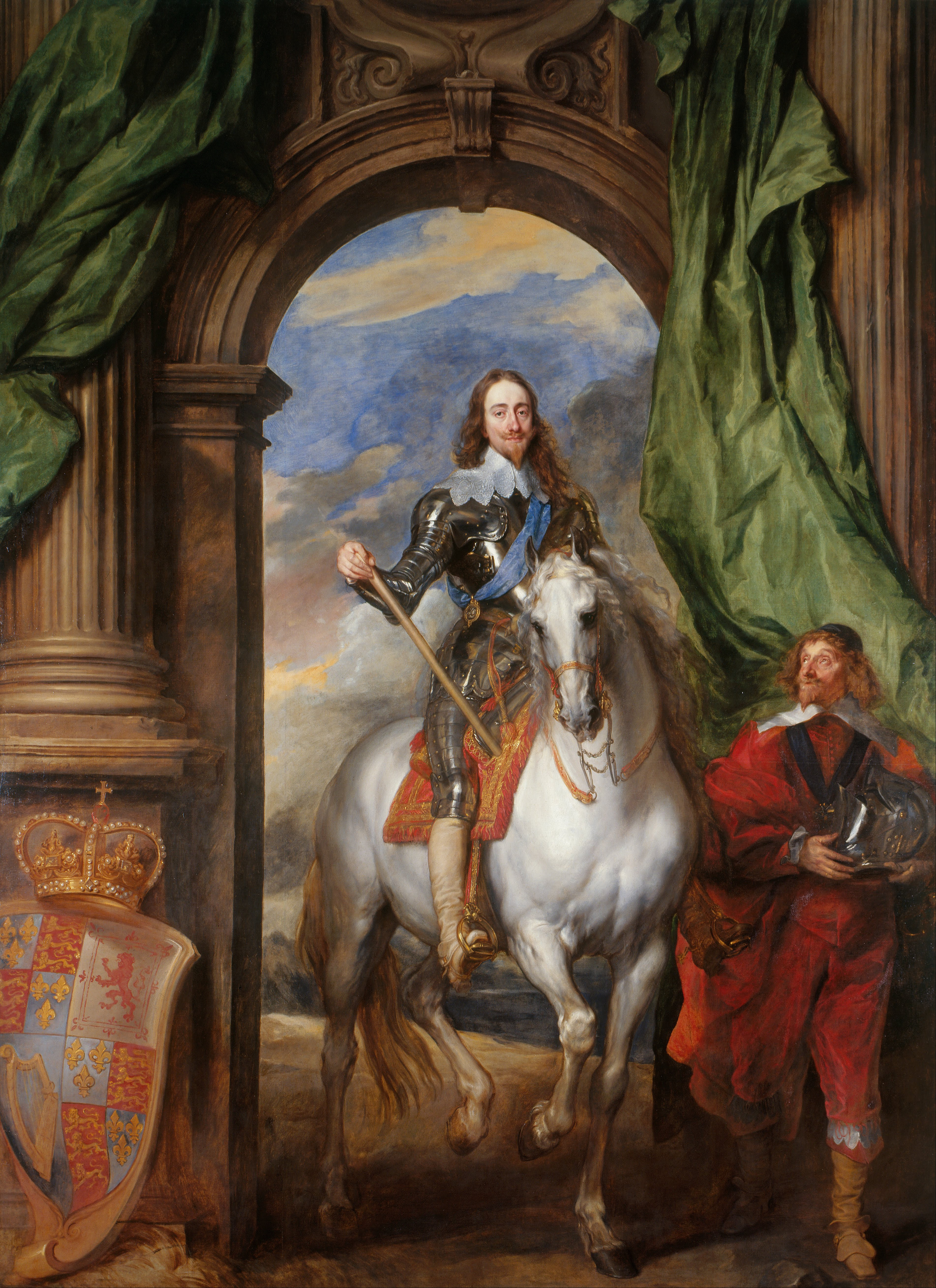
Charles I, whose policies caused instability throughout his three kingdoms

In 1650, Charles II repudiated his alliance with the Confederacy in return for Scottish military support, and Ormond went into exile. Defeat resulted in the mass confiscation of Catholic and Royalist land, and its re-distribution among Parliamentarian soldiers and Protestant settlers. The three kingdoms were combined into the Commonwealth of England, only regaining their separate status following the 1660 Stuart Restoration.

Charles II's reign was dominated by the expansionist policies of Louis XIV of France, seen as a threat to Protestant Europe. When his brother and heir James announced his conversion to Catholicism in 1677, an attempt was made to bar him from the English throne. Nevertheless, he became king in February 1685 with widespread support from the Protestant majorities in England and Scotland. Accepting a Catholic monarch was seen as preferable to excluding the 'natural heir', and Protestant dissident rebellions in England and Scotland were quickly suppressed. It was also viewed as temporary, since James was 52, his second marriage was childless after 11 years, and his Protestant daughter Mary was heir.

His religion made James popular among Irish Catholics, whose position had not improved under his brother. Catholic land ownership had fallen from 90% in 1600 to 22% in 1685, partially due to Catholic landlords converting to the Protestant Church of Ireland. After 1673, a series of proclamations deprived Catholic gentry of the right to bear arms or hold public office. The Catholic Richard Talbot, 1st Earl of Tyrconnell, was appointed Lord Deputy of Ireland in 1687, and began building a Catholic establishment that could survive James. Fearing a short reign, Tyrconnell moved at a speed that destabilised all three kingdoms.

When the English and Scottish Parliaments refused to remove civil restrictions on Catholics and Non-Conformists, James dismissed them and used the Royal Prerogative to force his measures through. These actions re-opened disputes over religion, rewarded the Protestant dissidents who rebelled in 1685, and undermined his own supporters. It also ignored the impact of the 1685 Edict of Fontainebleau, which revoked tolerance for French Protestants and created an estimated 400,000 refugees, 40,000 of whom settled in London. Two events turned discontent into rebellion, the first being the birth of James's son on 10 June 1688, which created the prospect of a Catholic royal dynasty. The second was James's prosecution of the Seven Bishops, which seemed to go beyond tolerance for Catholicism into actively attacking the Church of England. Their acquittal on 30 June caused widespread rejoicing, and destroyed James's political authority.

In 1685, many had feared civil war if James were bypassed. By 1688, even his chief minister, the Earl of Sunderland, felt only his removal could prevent it. Sunderland secretly coordinated an Invitation to William, assuring Mary and her husband, William of Orange (who was also James's nephew), of English support for armed intervention. William landed in Brixham on 5 November with 14,000 men; as he advanced, James's army deserted, and he went into exile on 23 December. In February 1689, the English Parliament appointed William and Mary joint monarchs of England, while the Scots followed suit in March.

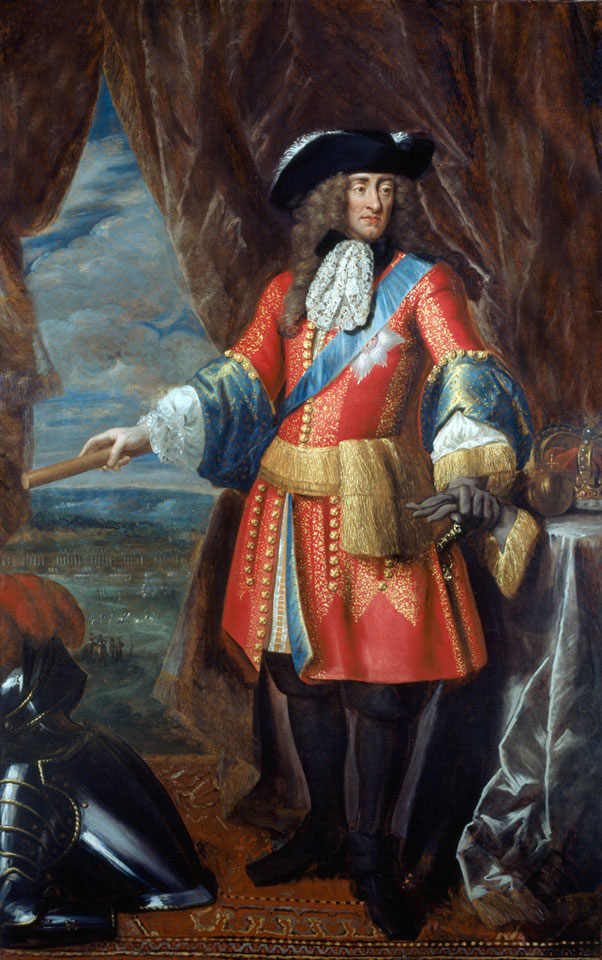
James II, 1685, dressed in military uniform

Most of Ireland was still controlled by Tyrconnell, where James landed on 12 March 1689 with 6,000 French troops, but the 1689-to-1691 Williamite War in Ireland highlighted two recurring trends. For James and his Stuart successors, the main prize was to regain England, while the primary French objective was to tie down British resources, rebellions in Scotland and Ireland being seen as the cheapest option. Elections in May 1689 produced the first Irish Parliament with a Catholic majority since 1613. It repealed the Cromwellian land seizures, confiscated land from Williamites, and proclaimed Ireland a 'distinct kingdom from England', measures subsequently annulled after defeat in 1691.

A Jacobite rising in Scotland achieved some initial success but was ultimately suppressed. Several days after the Irish Jacobites were defeated at the Battle of the Boyne in July 1690, victory at Beachy Head gave the French temporary control of the English Channel. James returned to France to urge an immediate invasion of England, but the Anglo-Dutch fleet soon regained maritime supremacy, and the opportunity was lost.

The Irish Jacobites and their French allies were finally defeated at the battle of Aughrim in 1691, and the Treaty of Limerick ended the war in Ireland; future risings on behalf of the exiled Stuarts were confined to England and Scotland. The Act of Settlement 1701 barred Catholics from the English throne, and when Anne became the last Stuart monarch in 1702, her heir was her Protestant cousin Sophia of Hanover, not her Catholic half-brother James. Ireland retained a separate Parliament until 1800, but the 1707 Union combined England and Scotland into the Kingdom of Great Britain. Anne viewed this as the unified Protestant kingdom which her predecessors had failed to achieve.

The exiled Stuarts continued to agitate for a return to power, based on the support they retained within the three kingdoms of England, Scotland and Ireland. Doing so required external help, most consistently supplied by France, while Spain backed the 1719 Rising. While talks were also held at different times with Sweden, Prussia, and Russia, these never produced concrete results. Although the Stuarts were useful as a lever, their foreign backers generally had little interest in their restoration.

== Ideology ==
Historian Frank McLynn identifies seven primary drivers in Jacobitism, noting that while the movement contained "sincere men [...] who aimed solely to restore the Stuarts", it "provided a source of legitimacy for political dissent of all kinds". Establishing the ideology of active participants is complicated by the fact that "by and large, those who wrote most did not act, and those who acted wrote little, if anything." As a result, historians have taken different views on its primary driving force. These include being an aristocratic rejection of an increasingly unitary state, feudal opposition to capitalism, or Scots and Irish nationalism.

Jacobitism drew on elements of a political theology shared by mostly non-juring Tory elements within the Church of England, and members of the Scottish Episcopal Church. These were the divine right of kings, their accountability to God, not man or Parliament; secondly, that monarchy was a divine institution; thirdly, legitimism, the crown's descent by indefeasible dynastic right, which could not be overturned or annulled; and lastly the scriptural injunction of passive obedience and non-resistance, even towards monarchs of which the individual subject might disapprove.

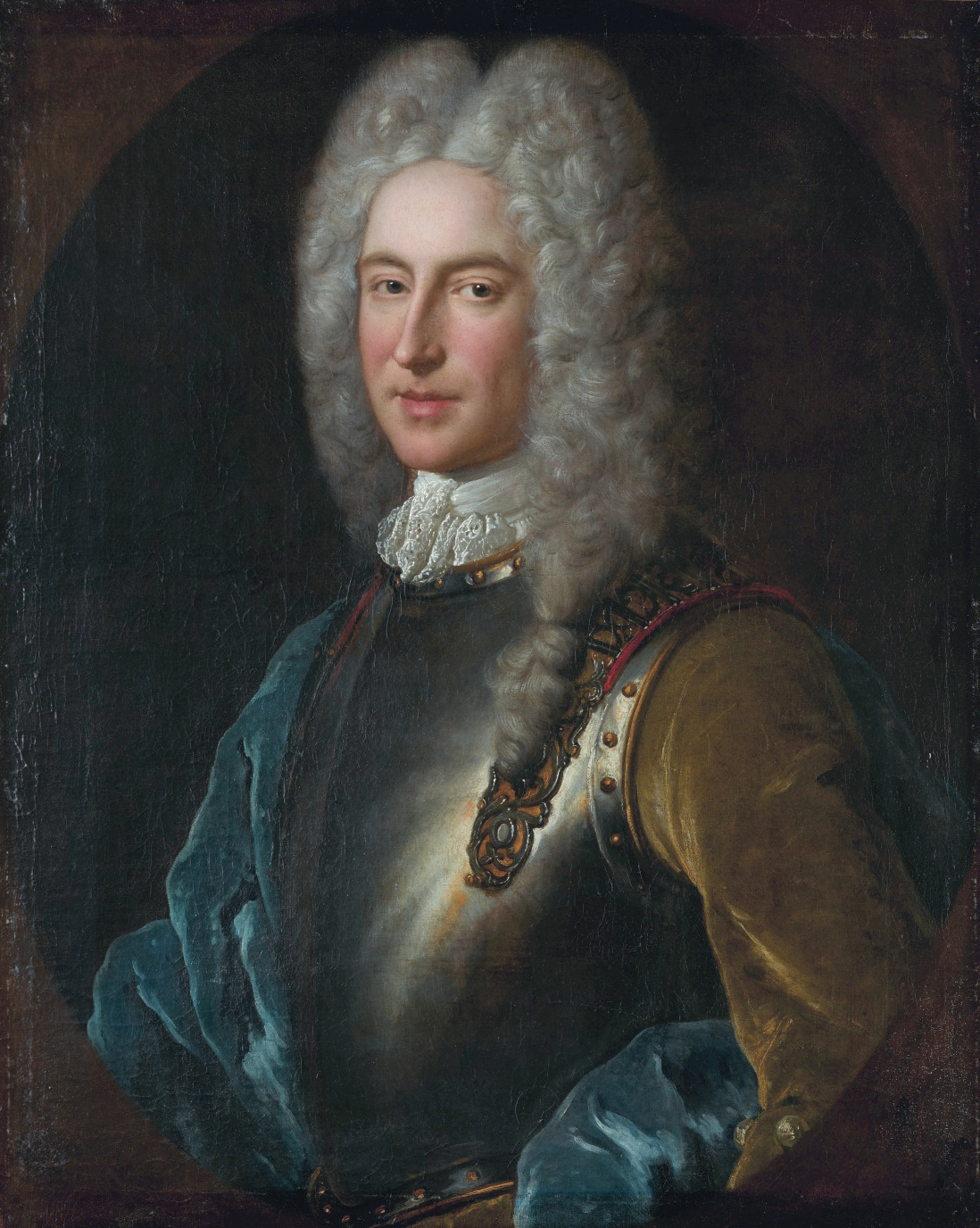
Alexander Forbes, 4th Lord Forbes of Pitsligo; his support of the doctrine of indefeasible hereditary right placed him in a minority of Jacobites by 1745

Jacobite propagandists argued such divinely sanctioned authority was the main moral safeguard of society, while its absence led to party strife. They claimed the 1688 Revolution had enabled political corruption and allowed selfish opportunists, such as Whigs, religious dissenters, and foreigners, to take control of the government and oppress the common people.

However, views on the 'correct' balance of rights and duties between monarch and subject varied, and Jacobites attempted to distinguish between 'arbitrary' and 'absolute' power. Non-juring Church of Ireland clergyman Charles Leslie was perhaps the most extreme divine right theorist, but even he argued the monarch was bound by "his oath to God, as well as his promise to his people" and "the laws of justice and honour". Jacobite pamphlets often suggested domestic issues were divine punishment on the British for rejecting their rightful king, although after 1710 this was blamed specifically on the Whigs.

These views were not held by all Jacobites, while many Whigs argued the post 1688 succession was also "divinely ordained". After the 1701 Act of Settlement, Jacobite propagandists deemphasised the purely legitimist elements in their writing and by 1745, active promotion of hereditary and indefeasible right was restricted largely to a few Scots Episcopalians such as Lords Pitsligo and Balmerino.

Instead they began to focus on populist themes such as opposition to a standing army, political corruption, and social injustice. By the 1750s, Charles himself promised triennial parliaments, disbanding the army and legal guarantees on freedom of the press. Such tactics broadened Jacobite appeal but also carried risks, since they could always be effectively neutered by a government prepared to offer similar concessions; indeed, the Triennial Act and the lapse of the Licensing of the Press Act meant that regular Parliaments and (relative) press freedom were already in place after 1695. The ongoing Stuart focus on England and regaining a united British throne led to tensions with their broader-based supporters in 1745, when the primary goal of most Scots Jacobites was ending the 1707 Union. This meant that following victory at Prestonpans in September, they preferred to negotiate, rather than invade England as Charles wanted.

More generally, Jacobite theorists reflected a broader conservative current in Enlightenment thought, appealing to those attracted to a monarchist solution to perceived modern decadence. Populist songs and tracts presented the Stuarts as capable of correcting a wide range of ills and restoring social harmony, as well as contrasting Dutch and Hanoverian "foreigners" with a man who even in exile continued to consume English beef and beer. While particularly calculated to appeal to Tories, the wide range of themes adopted by Jacobite pamphleteers and agents periodically drew in disaffected Whigs and former radicals, particularly those interested in the issue of constitutional reform. Such "Whig-Jacobites" were highly valued by the court-in-exile, although many viewed James II as a potentially weak king from whom it would be easy to extract concessions in the event of a restoration, particularly with regard to the structure of Parliament.

== Jacobite supporters in the three kingdoms ==
=== Ireland ===
Some argue that between 1688 to 1795, Jacobitism was the primary political outlet for Irish Catholic nationalism, although this is disputed. Historian Vincent Morely describes Irish Jacobitism as a distinctive ideology within the broader movement that "emphasised the Milesian ancestry of the Stuarts, their loyalty to Catholicism, and Ireland's status as a kingdom with a Crown of its own."

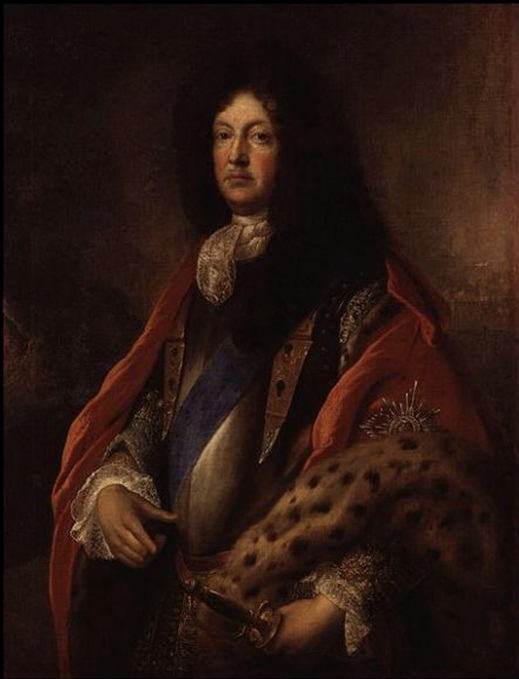
Tyrconnell, Deputy Governor of Ireland; his appointment of Catholics to military and political positions built widespread support for the Jacobite regime

Irish Catholic support for James was predicated on his religion and assumed willingness to support their demands for Irish autonomy. Tyrconnell's expansion of the army by the creation of Catholic regiments was welcomed by Diarmuid Mac Carthaigh, as enabling the native Irish 'Tadhg' to be armed and to assert his dominance over "John" the English Protestant. Conversely, most Irish Protestants viewed his policies as designed to "utterly ruin the Protestant interest and the English interest in Ireland". This restricted Protestant Jacobitism to "doctrinaire clergymen, disgruntled Tory landowners and Catholic converts", who opposed Catholicism but still viewed James' removal as unlawful. A few Church of Ireland ministers refused to swear allegiance to the new regime and became Non-Jurors, the most famous being propagandist Charles Leslie.

Since regaining England was his primary objective, James viewed Ireland as a strategic dead-end but Louis XIV of France argued it was the best place to start the counter-revolution, since the administration was controlled by Tyrconnell and his cause was popular among the majority Catholic population. James landed at Kinsale in March 1689 and in May called the first Parliament of Ireland since 1666, primarily seeking taxes to fund the war effort. Tyrconnell ensured a predominantly Catholic electorate and candidates by issuing new borough charters, admitting Catholics into city corporations, and removing "disloyal members". Since elections were not held in many northern areas, the Irish House of Commons was 70 members short, and 224 out of 230 MPs were Catholic.

Known to 19th-century Irish historians as the "Patriot Parliament", it opened by proclaiming James as the rightful king and condemning the "treasonous subjects" who had ousted him. There were some divisions among Irish Jacobites on the issue of returning all Catholic lands confiscated in 1652 after the Cromwellian conquest of Ireland. The majority of the Irish House of Commons wanted the 1652 Cromwellian Act of Settlement repealed in its entirety, with ownership returned to that prevailing in 1641. This was opposed by a minority within the Catholic elite who had benefited from the 1662 Act of Settlement, a group that included James himself, Tyrconnell and other members of the Irish House of Lords. Instead, they suggested those dispossessed in the 1650s should be restored to half their estates and paid compensation for the remainder. However, with the Commons overwhelmingly in favour of complete restoration, Tyrconnell persuaded the Lords to approve the bill.

More serious was the fact James was unwilling to do anything that might jeopardise potential support from Protestants in England and Scotland. These conflicted with the demands of the Irish Parliament, which in addition to land restoration included toleration for Catholicism and Irish autonomy. When it became clear Parliament would only vote war taxes if he met their minimum demands, James reluctantly gave his assent to Tyrconnell's land bill and passed a bill of attainder, confiscating estates from 2,000 mostly Protestant "rebels". Although he also approved Parliament's resolution that Ireland was a "distinct kingdom" and laws passed in England did not apply there (this was already true), he refused to abolish Poynings' Law, which denied the Irish Parliament the right of initiative.

Despite his own Catholicism, James viewed the Protestant Church of Ireland as an important part of his support base; he insisted on retaining its legal pre-eminence, although agreeing landowners would only have to pay tithes to clergy of their own religion. However, the price of these concessions was that Irish Jacobitism became almost entirely confined to Catholics, who after 1690 split between Tyrconnell's 'peace party', who sought a negotiated solution, and a 'war party' led by Patrick Sarsfield who favoured fighting on to the end.

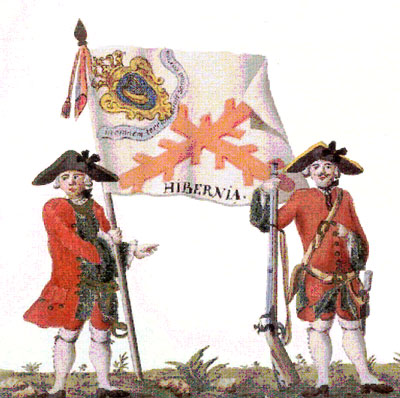
The Spanish Regiment of Hibernia, c. 1740; foreign military service remained common for Irish Catholics until banned after 1745

James left Ireland after defeat at the Boyne in 1690, telling his supporters to "shift for themselves". This led some to depict him as Séamus an chaca, "James the shit", who had deserted his loyal followers. However, Gaelic scholar Breandán Ó Buachalla claims his reputation subsequently recovered as "the rightful king ... destined to return', while upper-class Irish Jacobites like Charles O'Kelly and Nicholas Plunkett blamed "corrupt English and Scottish advisors" for his apparent desertion.

After 1691, measures passed by the 1689 Parliament were annulled, penal laws criminalized the practice of Catholicism and barred Catholics from public life, while the Act of Attainder was used to justify further land confiscations. 12,000 Jacobite soldiers went into exile in the diaspora known as the Flight of the Wild Geese, the majority of whom were later absorbed into the French Army's Irish Brigade. About 1,000 men were recruited for the French and Spanish armies annually, many with a "tangible commitment to the Stuart cause". Elements of the French Irish Brigade participated in the Scottish Jacobite rising of 1745.

Irish-language poets, especially in Munster, continued to champion the cause after James' death; in 1715, Eoin O Callanain described his son Prince James Francis Edward Stuart as taoiseach na nGaoidheal or "chieftain of the Gaels". As in England, throughout the 1720s, Prince James' birthday on 10 June was marked by celebrations in Dublin, and towns like Kilkenny and Galway. These were often accompanied by rioting, suggested as proof of popular pro-Jacobite sympathies. Others argue riots were common in 18th-century urban areas and see them as a "series of ritualised clashes".

Some historians claim Jacobite rhetoric and symbolism in the many works of Aisling poetry composed in the Irish language and support for rapparees like Éamonn an Chnoic, John Hurley, and Galloping Hogan, is proof of popular backing for a Stuart restoration. Others, however, argue it is hard to discern "how far rhetorical Jacobitism reflected support for the Stuarts, as opposed to discontent with the status quo". Nevertheless, fears of resurgent Jacobitism among the ruling Protestant minority meant anti-Catholic Penal Laws remained in place for most of the eighteenth century.

In both 1715 and 1745, there were no Irish risings to accompany those in England and Scotland. One suggestion is that for various reasons, post 1691 Irish Jacobites looked to European allies, rather than a domestic revolt. From the 1720s on, many middle-class Catholics were willing to swear loyalty to the Hanoverian regime, but balked at the Oath of Abjuration, which required them to reject the authority of the Pope, and doctrines of Transubstantiation and the Real Presence. After the effective demise of the Jacobite cause in the 1750s and '60s, organisations like the Catholic Convention were established to agitate for the redress of Catholic grievances before Parliament, detaching Catholic emancipation from Jacobitism, which was by then moribund as a cause. When Charles died in 1788, Irish nationalists looked for alternative liberators, among them the French First Republic, Napoleon Bonaparte and Daniel O'Connell.

=== England and Wales ===
In England and Wales, Jacobitism was often associated with the Tories, many of whom supported James's right to the throne during the Exclusion Crisis. Tory positions on constitutional matters gave rise to the belief that neither "time nor statute law [...] could ameliorate the sin of usurpation", while shared Tory and Jacobite themes of divine right and sacred kingship may have provided an alternative to Whig concepts of "liberty and property". A minority of academics, including Eveline Cruickshanks, have argued that until the late 1750s the Tories were a crypto-Jacobite party; others, that Jacobitism was a "limb of Toryism". However, the supremacy of the Church of England was also central to Tory ideology, and James lost their support when his policies seemed to threaten that primacy. The Act of Settlement 1701 excluding Catholics from the English throne was passed by a Tory administration; for most Tories, Stuart Catholicism was an insuperable barrier to active support, while the Tory doctrine of non-resistance also discouraged them from supporting the exiles against a reigning monarch, even one of dubious legitimacy.

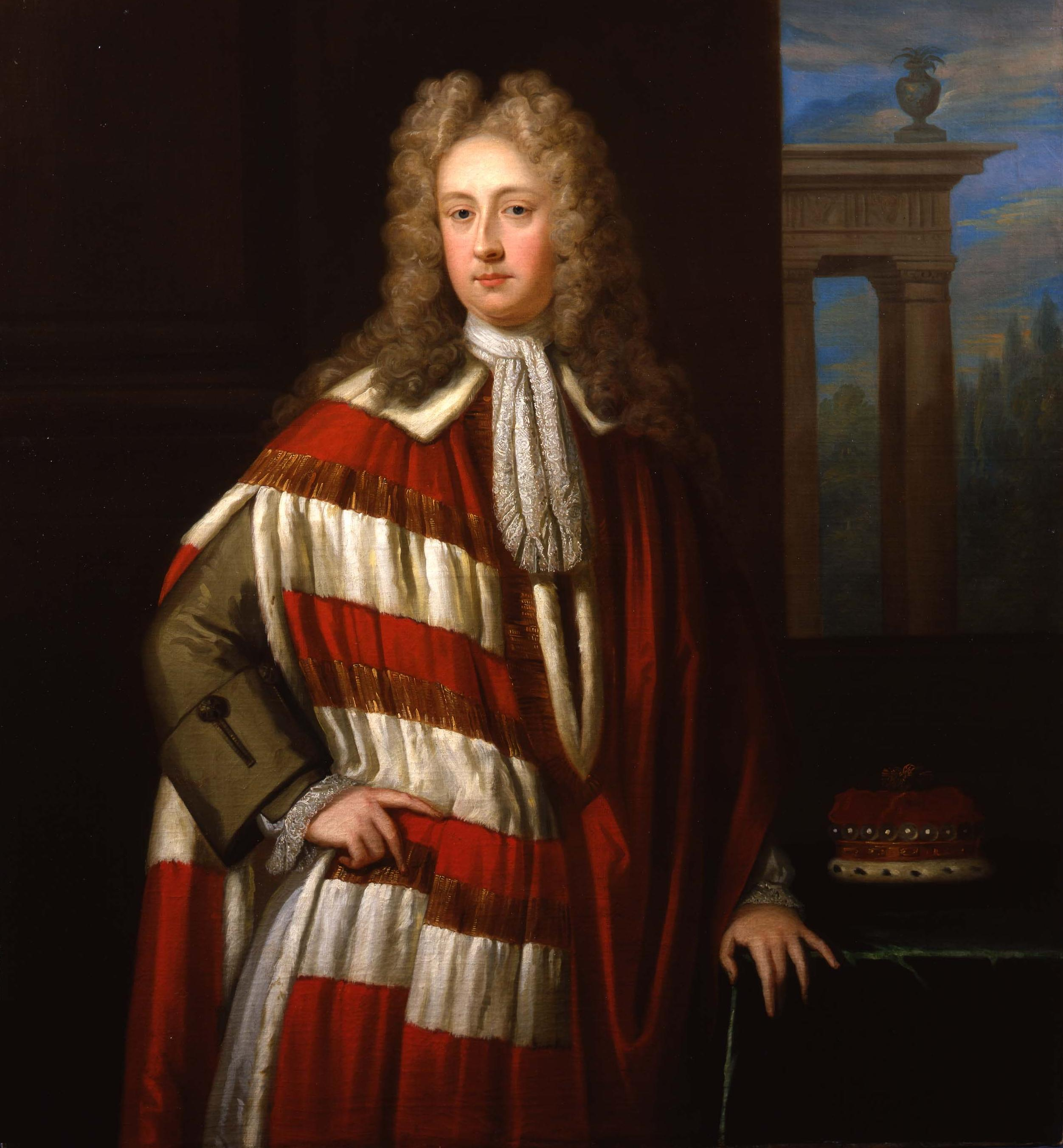
Tory minister and Jacobite Lord Bolingbroke; driven into exile in 1715 and pardoned in 1720

For most of the period from 1690 to 1714, Parliament was either controlled by the Tories, or evenly split with the Whigs; when George I succeeded Anne, most hoped to reconcile with the new regime. The Earl of Mar, who led the 1715 rising, observed "Jacobitisme, which they used to brand the Tories with, is now I presum out of doors". However, George blamed the Tory ministry for the Peace of Utrecht, which he viewed as damaging to his home state of Hanover. His isolation of former Tory ministers like Lord Bolingbroke and the Earl of Mar drove them first into opposition, then exile. Their exclusion from power between 1714 and 1742 led many Tories to get into or remain in contact with the Jacobite court, which they saw as a tool to put pressure on the Whig government, and a last resort if campaigning by peaceable means failed.

In 1715, there were co-ordinated celebrations on 29 May, Restoration Day, and 10 June, James Stuart's birthday, especially in Tory-dominated towns like Bristol, Oxford, Manchester and Norwich, although they remained quiet in the 1715 Rising. In the 1730s many 'Jacobite' demonstrations in Wales and elsewhere were driven by local sectarian tensions, especially hostility to Methodism, and featured attacks on Nonconformist chapels. Most English participants in 1715 came from traditionally Catholic areas in the Northwest, such as Lancashire. By 1720 there were fewer than 115,000 in England and Wales, and most remained loyal in 1745, including the Duke of Norfolk, the acknowledged leader of the English Catholics, who was sentenced to death for his role in 1715, but later pardoned. Even so, sympathies were complex; Norfolk's agent Andrew Blood joined the Manchester Regiment, and he later employed another ex-officer, John Sanderson, as his master of horse. Some English Catholics continued to provide the exiles with financial support well into the 1770s.

In 1689, around 2% of clergy in the Church of England refused to take the oath of allegiance to William and Mary; one list identifies a total of 584 clergy, schoolmasters and university dons as nonjurors. This understates their numbers, insofar as many sympathisers remained within the Church of England, but the small population of nonjurors were over-represented in Jacobite risings and riots, and provided many "martyrs". By the late 1720s arguments over doctrine and the death of much of its leadership reduced the nonjuring church to a handful of scattered congregations, but several of those executed in 1745 came from Manchester, the last significant nonjuring centre in England.

Support also came from quarters less obviously in tune with conservative monarchism; Quaker leader William Penn was a prominent Nonconformist supporter of James, although this was based on their personal relationship and did not survive his deposition. Another element in English Jacobitism was a handful of disaffected Radicals, whose left-wing (for the time) ideology was at face value incompatible with Jacobite conservatism, but who saw the possibility of extracting Parliamentary reform from a new and weak dynasty, and possibly replacing the (presumably) displaced Whigs as a major political party; John Matthews, a Jacobite printer executed in 1719; his pamphlet Vox Populi vox Dei emphasised the Lockean theory of the social contract, a doctrine very few Tories of the period would have supported.

=== Scotland ===
Scottish Jacobitism had wider and more extensive roots than in England. 20,000 Scots fought for the Jacobites in 1715, compared to 11,000 who joined the government army, and were the majority of the 9,000 to 14,000 who served in 1745. One reason was the persistence of feudalism in parts of rural Scotland, where tenants could be compelled to provide their landlords with military service. Many of the Highland clansmen who were a feature of Jacobite armies were raised this way: in all three major risings, the bulk of the rank and file were supplied by a small number of north-western clans whose leaders joined the rebellion.

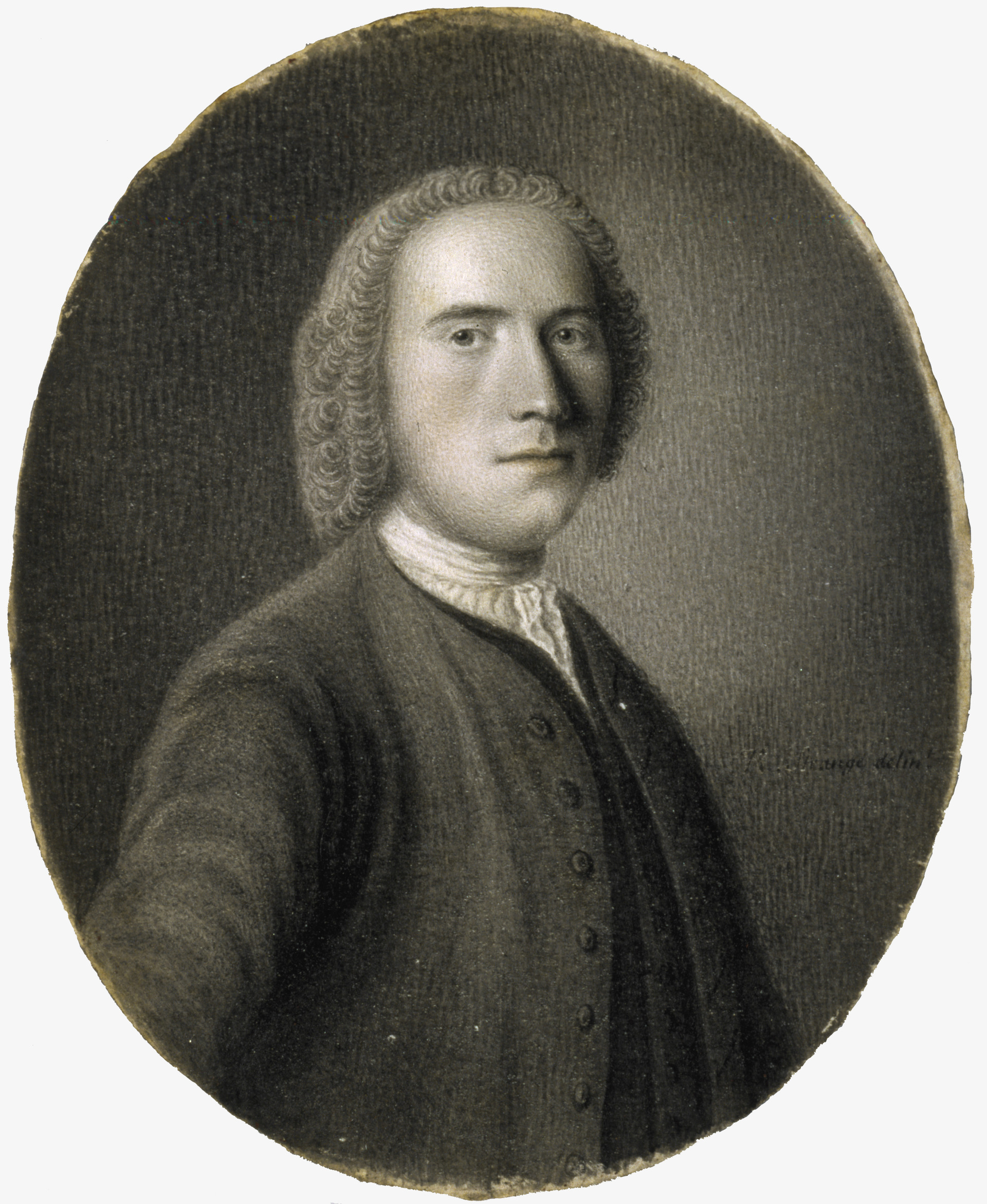
Jacobite commander George Murray; a pro-Union, anti-Hanoverian Scot who fought in the 1715, 1719 and 1745 Risings but loathed Prince Charles, he encapsulated the many contradictions of Jacobite support

Despite this, many Jacobites were Protestant Lowlanders, rather than the Catholic, Gaelic-speaking Highlanders of legend. By 1745, fewer than 1% of Scots were Catholic, restricted to the far north-west and a few noble families. The majority of the rank and file, as well as many Jacobite leaders, belonged to Protestant non-juring Episcopalian congregations. Throughout the 17th century, the close connection between Scottish politics and religion meant regime changes were accompanied by the losers being expelled from the Church of Scotland. In 1690, over 200 clergymen lost their parishes, mostly in Aberdeenshire and Banffshire, a strongly Episcopalian area since the 1620s. In 1745, around 25% of Jacobite recruits came from this part of the country.

Episcopalianism was popular among social conservatives, as it emphasised indefeasible hereditary right, absolute obedience, and implied deposition of the senior Stuart line was a breach of natural order. The church continued to offer prayers for the Stuarts until 1788, while many refused to swear allegiance to the Hanoverians in 1714. However, even in 1690, a substantial minority accommodated to the new regime, a number that increased significantly after the establishment of the Scottish Episcopal Church in 1712.

Episcopalian ministers, such as Professor James Garden of Aberdeen, presented the 1707 Union as one in a series of disasters to befall Scotland, provoked by "the sins [...] of rebellion, injustice, oppression, schism and perjury". Opposition was boosted by measures imposed by the post-1707 Parliament of Great Britain, including the Treason Act 1708, the 1711 ruling that barred Scots peers with English or British peerages from their seats in the House of Lords, and tax increases. Despite their own preferences, the Stuarts tried to appeal to this group; in 1745, Charles issued declarations dissolving the "pretended Union", despite concerns this would alienate his English supporters.

However, opposition to post-Union legislation was not restricted to Jacobites. Many Presbyterians opposed the establishment of the Episcopal Church in 1712 and other measures of indulgence, while the worst tax riots took place in Glasgow, a town noted for its antipathy to the Stuarts. As in England, some objected less to the Union than the Hanoverian connection; Lord George Murray, a senior Jacobite commander in 1745, was a Unionist who repeatedly disagreed with Charles, but opposed "wars [...] on account of the Electors of Hanover".

== Community ==
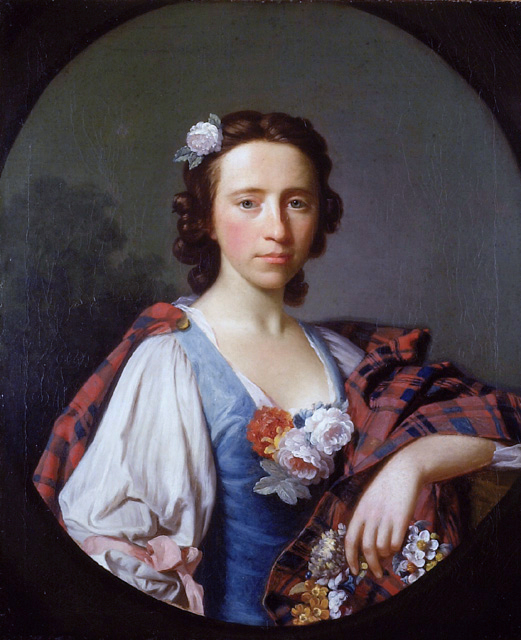
Flora MacDonald by Allan Ramsay c. 1749–1750; note white roses, a Jacobite symbol

While Jacobite agents continued in their attempts to recruit the disaffected, the most committed Jacobites were often linked by relatively small family networks, particularly in Scotland; Jacobite activities in areas like Perthshire and Aberdeenshire centred on a limited number of influential families heavily involved in 1715 and 1745.

Some of the most powerful landowning families preserved their establishment loyalties, but maintained traditions of Stuart allegiance by permitting younger sons to become involved in active Jacobitism; in 1745, Lewis Gordon was widely believed to be a proxy for his brother, the Duke of Gordon. Many Jacobite leaders were closely linked to each other and the exile community by marriage or blood. This has led some historians, notably Bruce Lenman, to characterise the Jacobite risings as French-backed coup attempts by a small network drawn from the elite, though this view is not universally accepted.

Family traditions of Jacobite sympathy were reinforced through objects such as inscribed glassware or rings with hidden symbols, although many of those that survive are in fact 19th-century neo-Jacobite creations. Other family heirlooms contained reference to executed Jacobite martyrs, for which the movement preserved an unusual level of veneration. Tartan cloth, widely adopted by the Jacobite army in 1745, was used in portraiture as a symbol of Stuart sympathies, even before the Rising. Outside elite social circles, the Jacobite community circulated propaganda and symbolic objects through a network of clubs, print-sellers and pedlars, aimed at the provincial gentry and middling sort. In 1745, Prince Charles ordered commemorative medals and miniature pictures for clandestine distribution.

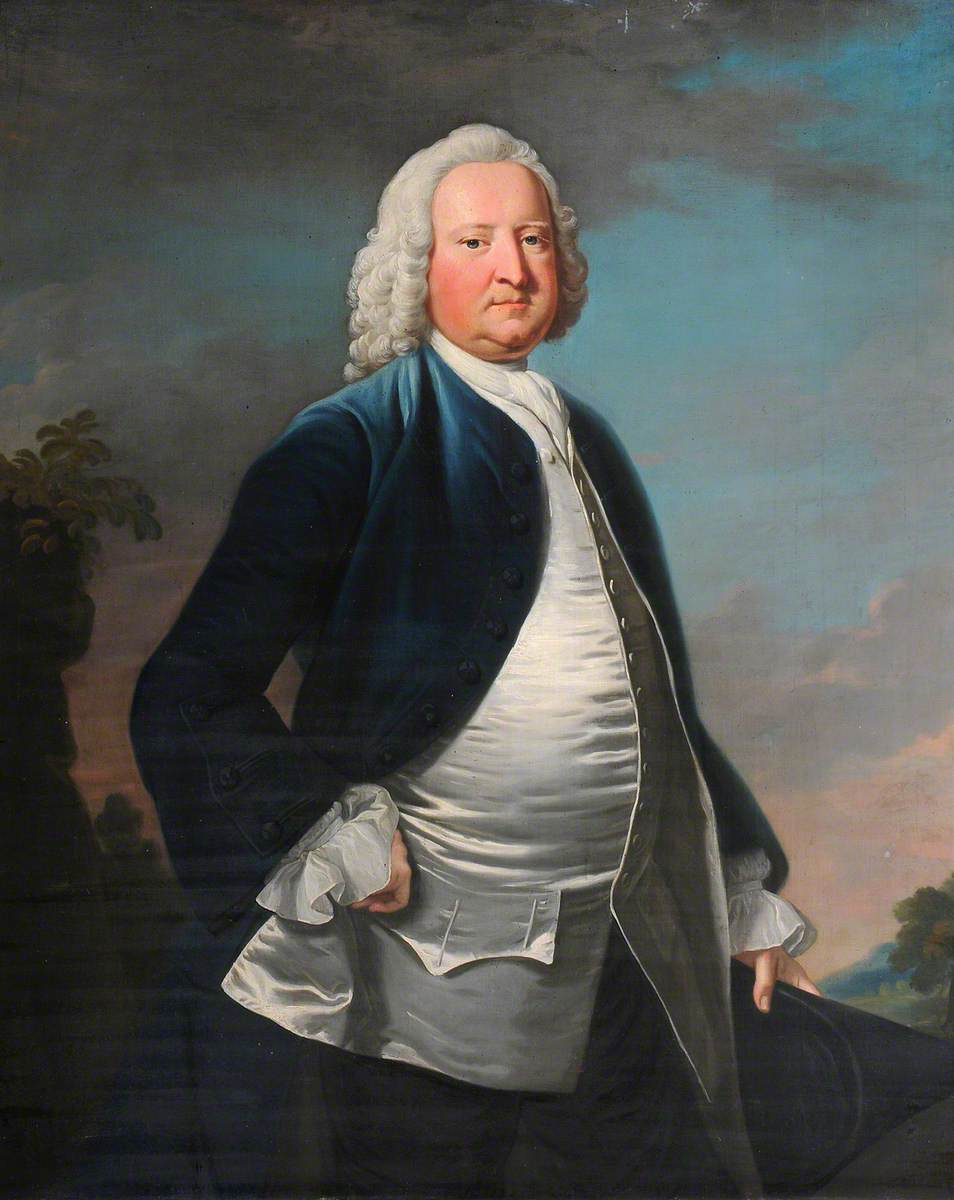
Welsh Tory Sir Watkin Williams-Wynn; his blue coat was a colour often worn by Jacobite sympathisers

Among the more visible elements of the Jacobite community were drinking clubs established in the early 18th century, such as the Scottish Bucks Club or the "Cycle of the White Rose", led by Welsh Tory Sir Watkin Williams-Wynn. Others included the "Sea Serjeants", largely composed of South Wales gentry or the "Independent Electors of Westminster" led by the Glamorganshire lawyer David Morgan, executed for his role in 1745. Other than Morgan, the vast majority of their members took no part in the 1745 Rising; Charles later said "I will do for the Welsh Jacobites what they did for me. I will drink their health".

Oak Apple Day on 29 May commemorated Charles II and was an occasion for displays of Stuart sympathy, as was "White Rose Day", the Old Pretender's birthday on 10 June. Symbols were commonly employed by Jacobites, given that they could not be prosecuted for their use; the most common of these was the White rose of York, adopted after 1688 for reasons now unclear. Various origins have been suggested, including its use as an ancient Scottish royal device, its association with James II as Duke of York, or Charles I being styled as the "White King". Jacobite military units often used plain white standards or cockades, while green ribbons were another recognised Stuart symbol despite their association with the Whig Green Ribbon Club.

== Post-1745 decline ==
Despite being greeted as a hero on his return to Paris, Charles' reception behind the scenes was more muted. D'Éguilles, unofficial French envoy to the Jacobites, had a low opinion of him and other senior Jacobites, describing Lochgarry as "a bandit", and suggesting George Murray was a British spy. For their part, the Scots were disillusioned by lack of meaningful English or French support, despite constant assurances of both. Events also highlighted the reality that a low level, ongoing insurgency was far more cost-effective for the French than a restoration, a form of warfare potentially devastating to the local populace. (Note: Summarised in a British intelligence report of 1755: "...'tis not in the interest of France the House of Stuart shoud ever be restored, as it would only unite the three Kingdoms against Them; England would have no exterior [threat] to mind, and [...] prevent any of its Descendants (the Stuarts) attempting anything against the Libertys or Religion of the People.") By exposing the divergence between Scottish, French and Stuart objectives, as well as the lack of support in England, the 1745 Rising ended Jacobitism as a viable political alternative in England and Scotland.

The British authorities enacted a series of measures designed to prevent the Scottish Highlands being used for another rising. New forts were built, the military road network finally completed and William Roy made the first comprehensive survey of the Highlands. Much of the power held by the Highland chiefs derived from their ability to require military service from their clansmen and even before 1745 the clan system had been under severe stress due to changing economic conditions; the Heritable Jurisdictions Act removed such feudal controls by Highland chiefs. This was far more significant than the better-known Act of Proscription which outlawed Highland dress unless worn in military service: its impact is debated and the law was repealed in 1782.

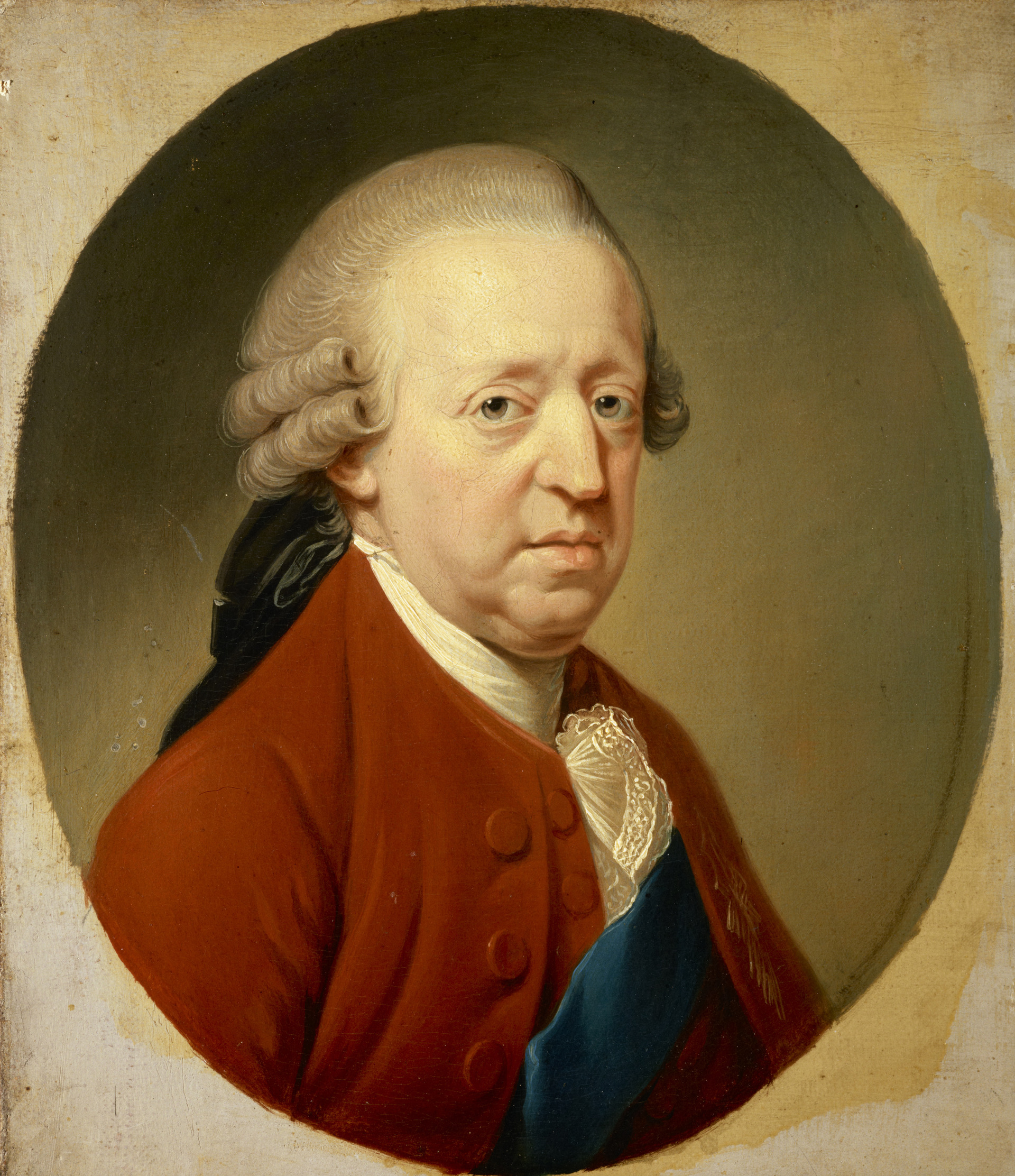
Charles Edward Stuart in old age; in 1759, he was dismissed by French ministers as "incapacitated by drink"

As early as 1745, the French were struggling with the costs of the War of the Austrian Succession, and in June 1746, they began peace negotiations with Britain at Breda. Victories in Flanders in 1747 and 1748 actually worsened their position by drawing in the previously neutral Dutch Republic, whose shipping they relied on to avoid the British naval blockade. By 1748, food shortages among the French population made peace a matter of urgency, but the British refused to sign the Treaty of Aix-la-Chapelle while Charles remained in France. After he ignored requests to leave, the French lost patience; in December 1748, he was briefly jailed before being deported.

In June 1747, Charles' brother Henry became a Catholic priest; given that Charles had no legitimate heir, this was seen as tacit acceptance by their father James that the Jacobite cause was finished. Charles continued to explore options for a rising in England, including his conversion to Anglicanism, a proposal that had outraged his father James when previously suggested. He "secretly" visited London in 1750 to meet supporters, and was inducted into the Non Juror church. However, the decline of Jacobitism is demonstrated by the fact that King George II and his government were well aware of Charles's presence and did nothing to intervene. The English Jacobites made it clear they would do nothing without foreign backing, which despite Charles's overtures to Frederick II of Prussia seemed unlikely.

A plot to capture or assassinate George II, headed by Alexander Murray of Elibank, was betrayed to the government by Alastair Ruadh MacDonnell, or "Pickle the Spy", but not before Charles had sent two exiles as agents. One was Archibald Cameron, responsible for recruiting the Cameron regiment in 1745, who was allegedly betrayed by his own clansmen and executed on 7 June 1753. In a 1754 dispute with the English conspirators, a drunken and increasingly desperate Charles threatened to publish their names for having "betrayed" him; most remaining English sympathisers now left the cause.

During the Seven Years' War in 1759, Charles met Choiseul, then Chief minister of France to discuss another invasion, but Choiseul dismissed him as "incapacitated by drink". The Jacobite cause was abandoned by the French, while British supporters stopped providing funds; Charles, who had returned to Catholicism, now relied on the Papacy to fund his lifestyle. However, with the death of Charles's father in 1766, the Hanoverians received the Pope's de facto recognition. Despite Henry's urgings, Clement XIII refused to recognise his brother as Charles III; Charles died of a stroke in Rome in January 1788, a disappointed and embittered man.

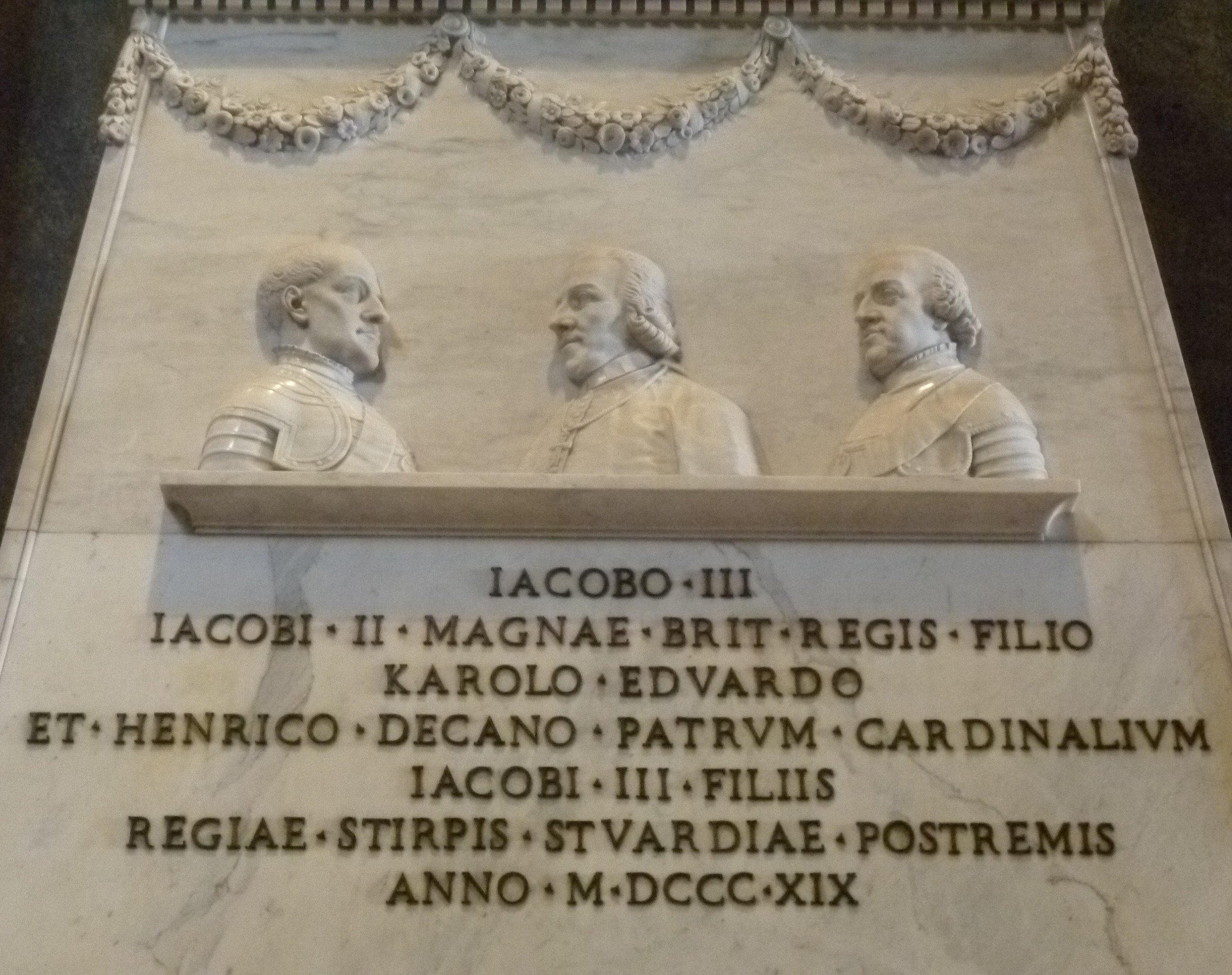
Detail of the monument in the Vatican

Following Charles's death, Scottish Catholics swore allegiance to the House of Hanover, and resolved two years later to pray for King George by name. The Stuart claim passed to Henry, now a Cardinal, who styled himself King Henry IX of England. After he fell into financial difficulty during the French Revolution, he was granted a stipend by George III. However, his refusal to renounce his claim to be 'Henry IX' prevented a full reconciliation with the House of Hanover.

During the Irish Rebellion of 1798, headed by the United Irishmen with French support, the Directory suggested making Henry King of the Irish. They hoped this would attract support from the Catholic Irish and lead to the creation of a stable pro-French client state. Wolfe Tone, the Protestant republican leader, rejected the suggestion, and a short-lived Irish Republic was proclaimed instead.

Following the death of Henry in 1807, the Jacobite claim passed to those excluded by the 1701 Act of Settlement. From 1807 to 1840, it was held by the House of Savoy, then the House of Habsburg-Lorraine until 1919, while the current Jacobite heir is Franz, Duke of Bavaria, from the House of Wittelsbach. However, neither he nor any of his predecessors since 1807 have pursued their claim. Henry, Charles and James are memorialised in the Monument to the Royal Stuarts in the Vatican.

== Analysis ==
Traditional Whig historiography viewed Jacobitism as a marginal threat to the progression towards present-day Parliamentary democracy, taking the view that as it was defeated, it could never have won. Representing "pre-industrial paternalism" and "mystical loyalism" against forward-thinking individualism, this conception of Jacobitism was reinforced by Macaulay's stereotype of the typical "Tory-Jacobite squire" as a "bigoted, ignorant, drunken philistine".

More recent analyses, such as that of J. C. D. Clark, suggest that Jacobitism can instead be regarded as part of a "deep vein of social and political conservatism running throughout British history", arguing that the Whig settlement was not as stable as has been depicted. Further interest in Jacobite studies has been prompted by a reassessment of the nationalist aspirations of Scots Jacobites in particular, emphasising their place as part of an ongoing political debate.

=== Romantic revival ===
As the political danger of Jacobitism receded, the movement was increasingly viewed as a romantic symbol of the past, particularly the final rebellion. Relics and mementoes of 1745 were preserved, and Charles himself celebrated in "increasingly emotional language". This memorialising tendency was reinforced by the publication in the 1830s of selections from The Lyon in Mourning by Robert Forbes (1708–1775), a collection of source material and interviews with Jacobite participants in the 1745 rising.

19th-century historiography often presented Scottish Jacobites as primarily driven by a romantic attachment to the Stuarts, rather than the reality of individuals with disparate motives. This suited the Victorian depiction of Highlanders as a "martial race", distinguished by a tradition of a "misplaced loyalism" since transferred to the British crown. The participation of the Lowland Scots and north-eastern gentry was less emphasised, while his Irish Jacobite advisors like Captain Félix O'Neille y O'Neille, were, until very recently, inaccurately presented as worthless individuals who were solely a negative influence on Charles Stuart in 1745.

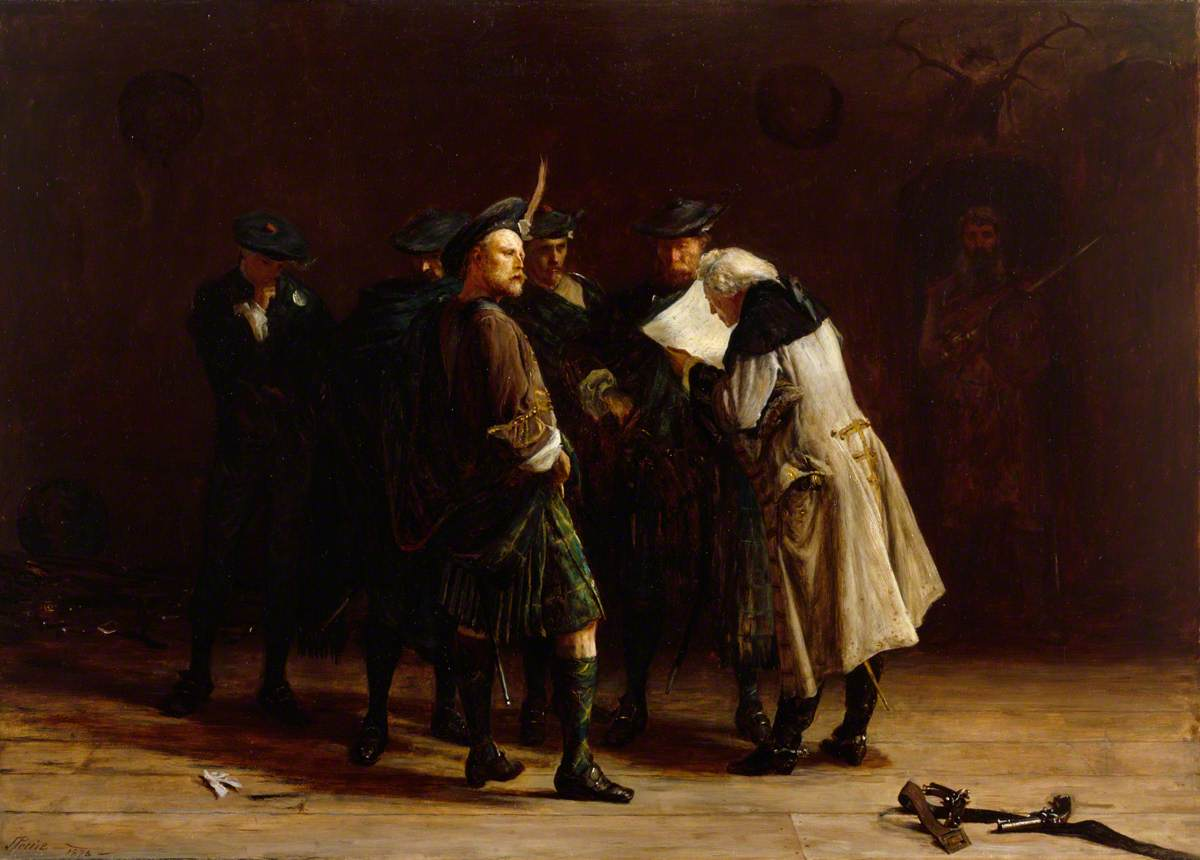
Jacobites, 1745 by John Pettie (1874): romantic view of Jacobitism

Walter Scott, author of Waverley, a story of the 1745 rebellion, combined a romantic view of Jacobitism with a belief in what he saw as the practical benefits of Whiggism. In 1822 he arranged a pageantry of reinvented Scottish traditions for the visit of King George IV to Scotland. The displays of tartan proved immensely popular, and Highland clothing, previously associated with rebellion and regime change, became emblems of Scottish national identity. Some descendants of those attained for rebellion had their titles restored in 1824, while persecutory and discriminatory laws against Catholics were repealed through the efforts of Daniel O'Connell in 1829. With political and military Jacobitism now safely confined to an "earlier era", the hitherto largely ignored site of their final defeat at Culloden began to be celebrated.

=== Neo-Jacobite revival ===
There was a brief revival of political Jacobitism in the late 1880s and into the 1890s. A number of Jacobite clubs and societies were formed, starting with the Order of the White Rose founded by Bertram Ashburnham in 1886. In 1890, Herbert Vivian and Ruaraidh Erskine co-founded a weekly newspaper, The Whirlwind, that espoused a Jacobite political view. Vivian, Erskine and Melville Henry Massue formed the Legitimist Jacobite League of Great Britain and Ireland in 1891, which lasted for several years. Vivian went on to stand for Parliament four times on a Jacobite platform – though he failed to be elected each time. The revival largely came to an end with the First World War, and the various societies of the time are now represented by the Royal Stuart Society.

== Literary legacy ==
=== English and Lowland Scots ===
Many Jacobite folk songs emerged in Scotland in the Romantic era; a number of examples were collected by Scott's colleague James Hogg in his Jacobite Reliques, including several he likely composed himself. Scots poets such as Sir Walter Scott, Robert Burns, Alicia Ann Spottiswoode, Agnes Maxwell MacLeod, and Carolina Nairne, Lady Nairne (whose "Bonnie Charlie" remains popular) added further examples. Many of these songs have seen a renewed popularity since the beginning of the British folk revival in the 1950s.

Relatively few of the most famous surviving songs, except for those by William Hamilton and James Robson, actually date from the time of the risings and the majority of those that do are in other languages than English or Scots.

=== Irish language literature ===
As demonstrated in 1924 by Daniel Corkery, in Modern literature in Irish, Jacobitism inspired the enormously influential Aisling or dream vision genre of Irish bardic poetry. One of the most widely known is Mo Ghile Mear by Seán Clárach Mac Domhnaill. Other important Jacobite poets who composed immortal verse in Munster Irish during the 18th-century included Aogán Ó Rathaille, Éamonn an Chnoic, Tadhg Gaelach Ó Súilleabháin, Eoghan Rua Ó Súilleabháin, and Donnchadh Ruadh Mac Conmara. The Aisling poetic genre has also remained a living tradition and has been adapted, by poets such as Máire Bhuidhe Ní Laoghaire, Pádraig Phiarais Cúndún, and Seán Gaelach Ó Súilleabháin to more recent causes and struggles by the Irish people. Since 1976, an Aisling poem by Liam mac Uistín in honour of "those who gave their lives for Irish freedom" has been permanently displayed at the Garden of Remembrance in Dublin.

=== Scottish Gaelic literature ===
By 1933, John Lorne Campbell published the groundbreaking book Highland Songs of the Forty-Five, consisting of 32 Gaelic song-poems, which were analyzed for political content, annotated, and published with facing translations into English blank verse, or unrhymed iambic pentameter; the real cultural, political, and religious reasons for the Jacobite rising of 1745 had been obscured by the novels of Sir Walter Scott and Robert Louis Stevenson, who both depicted, "the Highlander as a romantic hero fighting for a lost cause." In response, Campbell set out to give, "a voice to the voiceless – ordinary men who had never been allowed to speak for themselves".

As Campbell's volume and his later published writings revealed to the English-speaking world, within Scottish Gaelic literature, Jacobite ideology and the events of the risings inspired the immortal poetry of Iain Lom, Sìleas na Ceapaich, Alasdair Mac Mhaighstir Alasdair, Iain Mac Fhearchair, Catriona Nic Fhearghais, Iain Ruadh Stùibhart, and William Ross. Despite also composing immortal poetry of his own about fighting for the government in the Campbell of Argyll Militia during the Battle of Falkirk Muir in 1746, their contemporary, Duncan Ban MacIntyre, offers in his later poetry, according to Campbell, "an interesting testimony to the bitter disillusionment of the Highlanders who had come to the aid of the Government, to be in the end treated no better that those who had rebelled against it."

== Claimants to the thrones of England, Scotland, Ireland and France ==
- James II and VII (6 February 1685 – 16 September 1701).
- James III and VIII (16 September 1701 – 1 January 1766), James Francis Edward Stuart, also known as the Chevalier de St. George, the King over the Water, or the Old Pretender. (Son of James II)
- Charles III (1 January 1720 – 31 January 1788), Charles Edward Stuart, also known as Bonnie Prince Charlie, the Young Chevalier, or the Young Pretender. (Son of James III)
- Henry IX and I (31 January 1788 – 13 July 1807), Henry Benedict Stuart, also known as the Cardinal King. (Son of James III)

Since Henry's death, none of the Jacobite heirs have claimed the English or Scottish thrones. Franz, Duke of Bavaria (born 1933), a direct descendant of Charles I, is the current legitimate heir of the house of Stuart. It has been suggested that a repeal of the Act of Settlement 1701 could allow him to claim the throne, although he has expressed no interest in doing so.

== See also ==
- List of movements that dispute the legitimacy of a reigning monarch
- Carlism
- Traditionalist conservatism

== Sources ==
- Alleyne, Richard; de Quetteville, Harry (7 April 2008). "Act repeal could make Franz Herzog von Bayern new King of England and Scotland". The Daily Telegraph. London. Archived from the original on 23 June 2011.
- Aston, Nigel (2002). Christianity and Revolutionary Europe, 1750–1830. Cambridge University Press. ISBN 978-0521465922.
- Barnes, Robert P. (1973). "James VII's Forfeiture of the Scottish Throne". Albion: A Quarterly Journal Concerned with British Studies. 5 (4): 299–313. doi:10.2307/4048254. JSTOR 4048254.
- Black, Jeremy (1999). From Louis XIV to Napoleon: The Fate of a Great Power. Routledge. ISBN 978-1857289343.
- Brown, Richard (2002). Church and State in Modern Britain 1700–1850. Routledge.
- John Lorne Campbell (1979), Highland Songs of the Forty-Five, Arno Press, New York City
- Campsie, Alison (31 October 2017). "Myth Buster: Was Tartan Really Banned After Culloden?". The Scotsman. Archived from the original on 21 November 2017.
- Chambers, Liam (2018). Binasco, Matteo (ed.). Rome and The Irish Mission at home in Irish Catholicism in the Atlantic World, 1622–1908. Palgrave Press. ISBN 978-3319959740.
- Charteris, Evan (1907). A Short Account of the Affairs of Scotland. Edinburgh: David Douglas.
- Clark, J.C.D. (1985). English Society, 1688–1832: Ideology, Social Structure, and Political Practice During the Ancien Regime. Cambridge University Press. ISBN 0521309220.
- Colley, Linda (1985). In Defiance of Oligarchy: The Tory Party 1714–60. Cambridge University Press. ISBN 978-0521313117.
- Connolly, Sean (1992). Religion, Law and Power: Making of Protestant Ireland, 1660–1760. Clarendon Press. ISBN 978-0198201182.
- Connolly, Sean (2014). Patriotism and Nationalism in The Oxford Handbook of Modern Irish History. Oxford University Press. ISBN 978-0199549344.
- Connolly, Sean (2003). "Jacobites, Whiteboys and Republicans: Varieties of Disaffection in Eighteenth-Century Ireland". Eighteenth-Century Ireland / Iris an Dá Chultúr. 18 (1): 63–79. doi:10.3828/eci.2003.7. JSTOR 30070994. S2CID 164907232.
- Corp, Edward (2011). The Stuarts in Italy, 1719–1766. Cambridge University Press.
- Coward, Barry (1980). The Stuart Age 1603–1714. Longman. ISBN 978-0582488335.
- Cruikshanks, Lauchlin Alexander (2008). The Act of Union: Death or Reprieve for the Highlands?. Wesleyan University. OCLC 705142720.
- Doyle, Thomas (1997). "Jacobitism, Catholicism and the Irish Protestant Elite, 1700–1710". Eighteenth-Century Ireland / Iris an Dá Chultúr. 12 (1): 28–59. doi:10.3828/eci.1997.4. JSTOR 30071383. S2CID 256147597.
- Erskine-Hill, H. (1982). "Literature and the Jacobite Cause: Was There a Rhetoric of Jacobitism?". In Cruickshanks, E. (ed.). Ideology and Conspiracy: Aspects of Jacobitism, 1689–1759. Edinburgh: J. Donald.
- Garnham, Neal (2002). Clark, Peter (ed.). Police & Public Order in 18th Century Dublin in Two Capitals: London and Dublin, 1500–1840. British Academy. ISBN 978-0197262474.
- Gibson, William (2012). The Church of England 1688–1832: Unity and Accord. Routledge.
- Gillen, Ultan (2016). Ascendency Ireland, 1660–1800 in Princeton History of Modern Ireland. Princeton University Press. ISBN 978-0691154060.
- Goldsworthy, Jeffrey (2001). The Sovereignty of Parliament: History and Philosophy. Oxford University Press.
- Gooch, Leo (1995). The Desperate Faction?: The Jacobites of North-East England, 1688–1745. University of Hull Press. ISBN 978-0859586368.
- Graham, Brian, ed. (2002). In Search of Ireland: A Cultural Geography. Taylor and Francis. ISBN 978-1134749188.
- Hamilton, Douglas J. (2015). Jacobitism, Enlightenment and Empire, 1680–1820. Routledge. ISBN 978-1317318194.
- Hamilton, Henry (1963). An economic history of Scotland in the Eighteenth century. Clarendon Press.
- Harris, Tim (2007). Revolution; the Great Crisis of the British Monarchy 1685–1720. Penguin. ISBN 978-0141016528.
- Harris, Tim (1993). Politics under the Later Stuarts: Party Conflict in a Divided Society, 1660–1715. Longman. ISBN 978-0582040823.
- Harris, Tim (1993b). "Party Turns? Or, Whigs and Tories Get Off Scott Free". Albion: A Quarterly Journal Concerned with British Studies. 25 (4): 581–590. doi:10.2307/4051311. JSTOR 4051311.
- Hayes, Richard (1949). "Ireland and Jacobitism". Studies: An Irish Quarterly Review. 38 (149).
- Jackson-Williams, Kelsey (2020). The First Scottish Enlightenment: Rebels, Priests, and History. Oxford University Press.
- Jacob, Margaret C. (1976). "Millenarianism and Science in the Late Seventeenth Century". Journal of the History of Ideas. 7 (32): 335–341. doi:10.2307/2708829. JSTOR 2708829.
- James, Francis Godwin (1979). "The Church of Ireland in the Early 18th Century". Historical Magazine of the Protestant Episcopal Church. 48 (4): 433–451. JSTOR 42973720.
- Johns, Christopher M.S. (1998). Antonio Canova and the Politics of Patronage in Revolutionary and Napoleonic Europe. University of California Press. ISBN 978-0520212015.
- Kenyon, John; Ohlmeyer, Jane, eds. (1998). The Civil Wars: A Military History of England, Scotland and Ireland, 1638–60. Oxford University Press. ISBN 978-0198662228.
- Lenihan, Padraig (2001a). Confederate Catholics at War 1641–1649. Cork University Press. ISBN 978-1859182444.
- Lenihan, Padraig (2001b). "Introduction". In Lenihan, Padraig (ed.). Conquest and Resistance: War in Seventeenth-Century Ireland. Brill. ISBN 978-9004117433.
- Lenihan, Padraig (2008). Consolidating Conquest: Ireland 1603–1727 (2016 ed.). Routledge. ISBN 978-1138140639.
- Lenihan, Padraig (2014). The Last Cavalier: Richard Talbot (1631–91). University College Dublin Press. ISBN 978-1906359836.
- Lenman, Bruce (1980). The Jacobite Risings in Britain 1689–1746. Methuen Publishing. ISBN 978-0413396501.
- Lord, Evelyn (2004). The Stuart Secret Army: The Hidden History of the English Jacobites. Pearson. ISBN 978-0582772564.
- Lynn, John (1999). The Wars of Louis XIV, 1667–1714 (Modern Wars in Perspective). Longman. ISBN 978-0582056299.
- Macinnes, Allan (2007). "Jacobitism in Scotland: Episodic Cause or National Movement?". Scottish Historical Review. 86 (222): 225–252. doi:10.3366/shr.2007.86.2.225. S2CID 154561509.
- Mackie, John Duncan (1978) [1964]. Lenman, Bruce; Parker, Geoffrey (eds.). A History of Scotland (1991 reprint ed.). London: Penguin. ISBN 978-0-14-192756-5. OL 38651664M.
- Manganiello, Stephen (2004). The Concise Encyclopedia of the Revolutions and Wars of England, Scotland, and Ireland, 1639–1660. Scarecrow Press.
- McCann, Jean E. (1963). The Organisation of the Jacobite Army. PHD thesis Edinburgh University. hdl:1842/9381. OCLC 646764870.
- McCormick, Ted (2014). Restoration Ireland, 1660–1688; in The Oxford Handbook of Modern Irish History. Oxford University Press. ISBN 978-0198768210.
- McGrath, Charles Ivar (1996). "Securing the Protestant Interest: The Origins and Purpose of the Penal Laws of 1695". Irish Historical Studies. 30 (117): 25–46. doi:10.1017/S0021121400012566. hdl:10197/9696. JSTOR 30008727. S2CID 159743855.
- McKay, Derek (1983). The Rise of the Great Powers 1648–1815. Routledge. ISBN 978-0582485549.
- McLynn, Frank (1982). "Issues and Motives in the Jacobite Rising of 1745". The Eighteenth Century. 23 (2): 97–133. JSTOR 41467263.
- McLynn, Frank (1985). The Jacobites. Routledge. ISBN 9780710201652.
- Miller, John (1978). James II; A study in kingship. Menthuen. ISBN 978-0413652904.
- Mitchell, Albert (1937). "The Non-Jurors; 1688–1805". The Churchman. 51 (2).
- Monod, Paul (1993). Jacobitism and the English People, 1688–1788. Cambridge University Press. ISBN 978-0521447935.
- Moody, Tom; Martin, Frank; Byrne, F.J. (2009). A New History of Ireland: Volume III: Early Modern Ireland 1534–1691. Oxford University Press. ISBN 978-0198202424.
- Morley, Vincent (2007). "The Continuity of Disaffection in Eighteenth-Century Ireland". Eighteenth-Century Ireland / Iris an Dá Chultúr. 22.
- Morely, Vincent (2016). The Irish Language in Princeton History of Modern Ireland. Princeton University Press. ISBN 978-0691154060.
- Ó Ciardha, Eamonn (2000). Ireland and the Jacobite Cause, 1685–1766: A Fatal Attachment. Four Courts Press. ISBN 978-1851825349.
- Oates, Jonathan (2016). The Last Battle on English Soil, Preston 1715. Routledge.
- Overton, J.H. (1902). The Nonjurors: Their Lives, Principles, and Writings (2018 ed.). Wentworth Press. ISBN 978-0530237336.
- Parrish, David (2017). Jacobitism and Anti-Jacobitism in the British Atlantic World, 1688–1727. Royal Historical Society. ISBN 978-0861933419.
- Parker, Geoffrey (2002). Empire, War and Faith in Early Modern Europe (2003 ed.). Penguin. ISBN 978-0140297898.
- Pittock, Murray (1998). Jacobitism. Palgrave Macmillan. ISBN 978-0333667989.
- Pittock, Murray (1997). Inventing and Resisting Britain. Palgrave Macmillan.
- Pittock, Murray (2004). "Johnson, Boswell, and their circle". In Keymer, Thomas; Mee, Jon (eds.). The Cambridge companion to English literature from 1740 to 1830. Cambridge: Cambridge University Press. pp. 157–172. ISBN 978-0521007573.
- Pittock, Murray (2006). Poetry and Jacobite Politics in Eighteenth-Century Britain and Ireland. Cambridge University Press. ISBN 978-0521030274.
- Pittock, Murray (2009). The Myth of the Jacobite Clans: The Jacobite Army in 1745. Edinburgh University Press. ISBN 978-0748627561.
- Pittock, Murray (2014). Spectrum of Decadence (Routledge Revivals): The Literature of the 1890s. Routledge. ISBN 978-1138799127.
- Plank, Geoffrey (2005). Rebellion and Savagery: The Jacobite Rising of 1745 and the British Empire. University of Pennsylvania Press. ISBN 978-0812238983.
- Riding, Jacqueline (2016). Jacobites: A New History of the 45 Rebellion. Bloomsbury. ISBN 978-1408819128.
- Robb, Steven (2013). "Gordon, Robert (1703–1779)". Oxford Dictionary of National Biography (online ed.). Oxford University Press. doi:10.1093/ref:odnb/105934. (Subscription, Wikipedia Library access or UK public library membership required.)
- Rogers, Nicholas (1998). Crowds, Culture, and Politics in Georgian Britain. Oxford University Press.
- Rogers, Nicholas (1982). Riot and Popular Jacobitism in Early Hanoverian England, in Ideology and conspiracy: aspects of Jacobitism, 1689–1759. John Donald Publishers Ltd. ISBN 978-0859760843.
- Ryan, Conor (1975). "Religion and State in Seventeenth-Century Ireland". Archivium Hibernicum. 33: 122–132. doi:10.2307/25487416. JSTOR 25487416.
- Seymour, W.A. (1980). A History of the Ordnance Survey. Dawson. ISBN 978-0712909792.
- Simms, J.G. (1952). "Williamite Peace Tactics, 1690–1691". Irish Historical Studies. 8 (32): 303–323. doi:10.1017/S0021121400027528. JSTOR 30006194. S2CID 164073726.
- Shaw, John S. (1999). The Political History of Eighteenth-Century Scotland. Macmillan.
- Smith, Hannah (2013). Georgian Monarchy: Politics and Culture, 1714–60. Cambridge University Press. ISBN 978-0521828765.
- Somerset, Anne (2012). Queen Anne; the Politics of Passion. HarperCollins. ISBN 978-0007203765.
- Spielvogel, Jackson J (1980). Western Civilization. Wadsworth Publishing. ISBN 1285436407.
- Stephen, Jeffrey (January 2010). "Scottish Nationalism and Stuart Unionism". Journal of British Studies. 49 (1, Scottish Special). doi:10.1086/644534. S2CID 144730991.
- Strong, Rowan (2002). Episcopalianism in Nineteenth-Century Scotland: Religious Responses to a Modernizing Society. Oxford University Press.
- Szechi, Daniel (1994). The Jacobites: Britain and Europe, 1688–1788 (first ed.). Manchester University Press. ISBN 978-0719037740.
- Szechi, Daniel; Sankey, Margaret (November 2001). "Elite Culture and the Decline of Scottish Jacobitism 1716–1745". Past & Present (173): 90–128. doi:10.1093/past/173.1.90. JSTOR 3600841.
- Wills, Rebecca (2001). The Jacobites and Russia, 1715–1750. Tuckwell Press Ltd. ISBN 978-1862321427.
- Worden, Blair (2010). "Oliver Cromwell and the Protectorate". Transactions of the Royal Historical Society. 20 (6): 57–83. doi:10.1017/S0080440110000058. JSTOR 41432386. S2CID 159710210.
- Yates, Nigel (2014). Eighteenth Century Britain: Religion and Politics 1714–1815. Routledge.
- Zimmerman, Doron (2003). The Jacobite Movement in Scotland and in Exile, 1749–1759. Palgrave Macmillan. ISBN 978-1403912916.
