= Ian McBride =

British historian and academic (born 1967)

Professor Ian McBride FRHistS
- Born: Ian Richard McBride; 1967 (age 58–59); Armagh, County Armagh, Northern Ireland
- Occupations: Historian and academic
- Title: Foster Professor of Irish History

Academic background
- Education: Jesus College, Oxford (BA); University College London (PhD)

Ian Richard McBride FRHistS is Foster Professor of Irish History at the University of Oxford and a Fellow of Hertford College. He is a visiting professor of Irish studies at the University of Notre Dame.

== Career ==
McBride earned his BA at Jesus College, Oxford, after which he completed three years as a research fellow at Corpus Christi College, Cambridge. He received his PhD from the University of London and lectured at the University of Durham. He joined King's College in 2000 as professor of Irish and British history. McBride is also Patrick B. O'Donnell Visiting Professor of Irish Studies at the Keough-Naughton Institute for Irish studies, University of Notre Dame. In 2017 he was appointed Foster Professor of Irish History at Hertford College, Oxford.

In 2012, McBride presented Forgotten Revolutionary: Francis Hutcheson, a one-hour documentary on the philosopher Francis Hutcheson, on BBC2 television.

== Research ==
McBride's research interests include the history of modern Ireland, intellectual history, the role of memory and commemoration in describing the past, the history of the British Isles in the Long 18th Century and the history of Northern Ireland since 1920.

== Selected publications ==
- "Burke and Ireland", in David Dwan and Christopher Insole (eds.), The Cambridge Companion to Edmund Burke (Cambridge, 2013), pp. 181–95.
- "The Shadow of the Gunman: Irish Historians and the IRA", Journal of Contemporary History, 46 (3), pp. 686–710.
- "Catholic Politics in the Penal Era: Father Sylvester Lloyd and the Devlin Address of 1727", Eighteenth-Century Ireland, (2011), pp. 115–47.
- Eighteenth-Century Ireland: The Isle of Slaves. Dublin, Gill & Macmillan, 2009.
