= Paul Seaward =

British historian

Paul Seaward is a British historian specialising in seventeenth-century English history.

He is a Director of The History of Parliament Trust. With Martin Dzelzainis, he is General Editor of the Oxford edition of the works of Lord Clarendon. In the Spring of 2026, Seaward was a Resident Fellow at the Swedish Collegium for Advanced Study in Uppsala, Sweden.

== Works ==
- The Cavalier Parliament and the Reconstruction of the Old Regime (Cambridge, 1989).
- The Restoration, 1660–1668 (Macmillan 1990).
- (editor, with Mark Goldie and Tim Harris), The Politics of Religion in Restoration England (Basil Blackwell, 1990).
- (with Paul Silk), ‘The House of Commons in the Twentieth Century’, in Vernon Bogdanor (ed.), The British Constitution in the Twentieth Century (Oxford University Press for the British Academy, 2002).
- ‘Clarendon, Tacitism, and the Civil Wars of Europe’, in Paulina Kewes (ed.), The Uses of History in Early Modern England (Huntington Library Quarterly vol. 36 (2005)).
- (editor), Edward Hyde, Earl of Clarendon. The History of the Rebellion: A New Selection (Oxford University Press, 2009).
- (editor), Thomas Hobbes, Behemoth (Oxford University Press, 2009).
- ‘The House of Commons, 1660–1707’ and ‘The House of Commons since 1949’, in Clyve Jones (ed.), A Short History of Parliament (Boydell and Brewer, 2009).
- (editor, with Ruth Paley and Beverly Adams, Robin Eagles and Charles Littleton) Honour, Interest and Power: An Illustrated History of the House of Lords, 1660–1715 (Boydell and Brewer 2010).
- (editor), Speakers and the Speakership (a volume of essays published as Parliamentary History, 29, 1 (2010).
