= Ruth Paley =

English historian and author

Ruth Paley is an English historian and author.

She has worked at The National Archives in Kew, London, where she has written several books. She is currently working for the History of Parliament Trust on the House of Lords from 1660 to 1832. Since 2006, she has been editor of Archives, the journal of the British Records Association. She has also co-authored accessible works such as Honour, Interest and Power: An Illustrated History of the House of Lords, 1660–1715, aimed at bridging scholarly research and public interest

== Works ==
- Using Criminal Records, Public Record Office, 2001 ISBN 1903365279
- My Ancestor was a Bastard: a family historian's guide to sources for illegitimacy in England and Wales, Society of Genealogists, 2004 ISBN 1903462789
- Family Skeletons: exploring the lives of our disreputable ancestors, with Simon Fowler, The National Archives, 2005 ISBN 1-903365-54-6
