= Bruce Lenman =

British historian

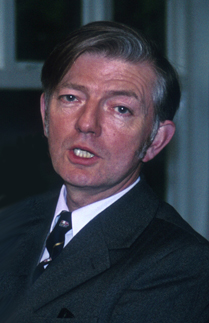
Bruce Lenman pictured in 1983

Bruce Philip Lenman is a historian and author specializing in the Jacobean era of Scottish politics, whose books have been described as “major works” by The Scottish Historical Review.

== Biography ==
Lenman was born in Aberdeen in April 1938 to Jacob and May Lenman (nee Wishart). He studied at Aberdeen Grammar School before attending the University of Aberdeen and later St John’s College Cambridge as a post graduate.

He went on to hold numerous positions lecturing at various American universities, having established a base in St Andrews, whose University duly granted him the title of Emeritus upon his retirement.

=== Family ===
He is the paternal uncle of musician Jamie Lenman.

== Selected bibliography ==
- 1975 - From Esk to Tweed
- 1977 - Economic History of Modern Scotland
- 1980 – The Jacobite Risings in Britain, 1689-1746
- 1984 - Jacobite Clans of the Great Glen, 1650-1784
- 1986 - The Jacobite Cause
- 1992 - The Eclipse of Parliament: Appearance and Reality in British Politics Since 1914
- 1993 - Integration and Enlightenment: Scotland, 1746-1832
- 1995 - "Jacobean Goldsmith-Jewellers as Credit-Creators: The Cases of James Mossman, James Cockie and George Heriot", Scottish Historical Review, 74:198 Part 2 (October 1995), pp. 159–177.
- 2000 - England's Colonial Wars 1550-1688
- 2001 - Britain's Colonial Wars, 1688-1783
- 2009 - Enlightenment and Change: Scotland 1746-1832
