= J. C. D. Clark =

British historian (born 1951)

Jonathan Charles Douglas Clark (born 28 February 1951) is a British historian of both British and American history.

== Early life ==
Jonathan Charles Douglas Clark was born on 28 February 1951. He received his undergraduate degree at Downing College, Cambridge. Having previously held posts at Peterhouse, Cambridge, and All Souls College, Oxford, until 1996; he has since held the Joyce C. and Elizabeth Ann Hall Distinguished Professorship of British History at the University of Kansas.

== Writings ==
Clark began as a revisionist historian of 17th- and 18th- century British history. He is known for arguing against both the Marxist and Whiggish interpretations of the late 17th and 18th centuries. Instead, Clark emphasises the unities and coherences of the period between 1660 and 1832. Clark maintains the period was one of Anglican-aristocratic hegemony, marked by popular acceptance of the monarchy and the Church of England as symbols of national unity. He characterised this edifice as one dominated by an aristocratic-gentry oligarchy and a sense of national identity (preceding 19th-century nationalism), which was firmly underpinned by a shared history and religious allegiance. In Clark's model, Britons embraced the official entrenchment of these parameters, which was challenged primarily by religious dissent.

In his first work, The Dynamics of Change (1982), Clark attempted to explain how the two-party system of Queen Anne's reign, described by Geoffrey Holmes in British Politics in the Age of Anne (1967), was transformed into the more fluid system of George III's reign that was uncovered by Lewis Namier in The Structure of Politics at the Accession of George III (1929). Clark argued that the Tory and Whig parties survived Anne's death in 1714 until the political crisis of March 1754 – June 1757 caused the realignment of British politics, which produced the political groupings that George III inherited in 1760.

Clark's Revolution and Rebellion, published in 1986, is a study of the historiography of 17th- and 18th- century English history. He categorised historians into "Old Hat" (Whig–Liberal), "Old Guard" (Marxist), and "Class of '68" (modern radical) schools, all of whom he criticised as mistaken. Clark reiterated his belief in the central position of religion in the conflicts of these centuries: he argued that it was those who cared most about religion who had caused parliament to play a more active role in the years before the Civil War. Jacobitism, in Clark's view, was important in the 18th century because it was the only realistic (because it was non-secular) alternative to Hanoverian rule. The disappearance of the Jacobite alternative during the Seven Years' War, Clark maintained, led to the consolidation of the Anglican and monarchic confessional state.

In his 1993 work, The Language of Liberty, 1660–1832, Clark reinterpreted the American Revolution as America's first civil war and the West's last war of religion. The Revolution, Clark asserted, was triggered by the denominational conflicts still endemic at that time within the English-speaking North Atlantic world.

Clark has frequently maintained that the 18th century has too often been interpreted teleologically in the light of the 19th century. Styled by Ronald Hutton as a "political and religious reactionary", Clark criticised Marxists such as Christopher Hill, Eric Hobsbawm, and E. P. Thompson for advancing what he derided as incorrect interpretations. In 1985, Clark called Hill, Hobsbawm, and Thompson "that cohort of scholars whose minds were formed in the matrix of inter-war Marxism".

Clark became known for his attacks in the 1980s on Sir John H. Plumb, which brought controversy and according to Hutton made him "probably the most hated living historian". A letter defending Plumb was published and signed by every history professor at Cambridge except for Sir Geoffrey Elton. Portions of Clark's work were accepted by his colleagues (though perhaps as exaggerated) and several of them said that he "had performed a valuable service in drawing attention to important features of eighteenth-century society, particularly the religious element, which had hitherto been neglected".

In 1994, Clark published Samuel Johnson: Literature, Religion, and English Cultural Politics from the Restoration to Romanticism, in which he argued that Johnson was not only a Tory but also a Jacobite and a nonjuror (one who declined or avoided loyalty oaths to the Hanoverians). The thesis proved controversial. Clark and the Cambridge-based literary scholar Howard Erskine-Hill debated American literary scholars, chiefly Donald Greene and Howard Weinbrot, in two successive volumes of The Age of Johnson (volumes 7 and 8) and an issue of Studies in English Literature. Clark and Erskine-Hill produced an edited volume on Johnson's political views in 2002 and two additional volumes on the subject in 2012.

His 2024 book, The Enlightenment: An Idea and Its History, posits that the concept of "Enlightenment" was unknown at the time and was only formulated in the 19th and mainly in the 20th century.

== Works ==
- The Dynamics of Change: the Crisis of the 1750s and English Party Systems (Cambridge University Press, 1982). ISBN 0-521-23830-7.
- English Society, 1688–1832: Ideology, Social Structure, and Political Practice During the Ancien Regime. Cambridge University Press. 1985. ISBN 0-521-30922-0. 2nd (revised) ed. 2000. ISBN 0-521-66180-3.
- Revolution and Rebellion: State and Society in England in the Seventeenth and Eighteenth Centuries. Cambridge University Press. 1986. ISBN 0-521-33063-7.
- Editor, The Memoirs and Speeches of James, 2nd Earl Waldegrave, 1742–1763 (Cambridge University Press, 1988). ISBN 0-521-36111-7.
- Editor, Ideas and Politics in Modern Britain (Basingstoke: Macmillan, 1990). ISBN 0-333-51551-X.
- The Language of Liberty, 1660–1832: Political Discourse and Social Dynamics in the Anglo-American World. Cambridge University Press. 1994a. ISBN 0-521-44957-X.
- Samuel Johnson: Literature, Religion, and English Cultural Politics from the Restoration to Romanticism (Cambridge University Press, 1994b). ISBN 0-521-47304-7.
- "British America: What If There Had Been No American Revolution?" in Virtual History, ed. Niall Ferguson (New York: Basic Books, 1997; 1999), pp. 125–174. ISBN 0-333-64728-9.
- Co-editor, Samuel Johnson in Historical Context, co-editor: Howard Erskine-Hill (New York: Palgrave, 2002). ISBN 0-333-80447-3.
- Editor, Edmund Burke: Reflections on the Revolution in France: a Critical Edition (Stanford University Press, 2001). ISBN 0-8047-3923-4.
- Our Shadowed Present: Modernism, Postmodernism and History (London: Atlantic Books, 2003). ISBN 1-84354-122-X.
- The Politics of Samuel Johnson, co-editor: Howard Erskine-Hill (New York: Palgrave, 2012). ISBN 978-0230355996
- The Interpretation of Samuel Johnson, co-editor: Howard Erskine-Hill (New York: Palgrave, 2012). ISBN 978-0230356009
- From Restoration to Reform: The British Isles 1660–1832 (London: Vintage, 2014). ISBN 978-0099563235
- Thomas Paine: Britain, America, and France in the Age of Enlightenment and Revolution (Oxford University Press, 2018). ISBN 9780198816997
- The Enlightenment: An Idea and Its History. Oxford University Press. 2024. doi:10.1093/9780198916314.001.0001. ISBN 978-0198916284.
