= Simon Fowler (author) =

English social historian and author

John Simon Fowler (born 22 January 1956) is an English social historian and author who lives in Kew, Richmond, London and is vice-chair of the Richmond Local History Society. He has written many books relating to family history and social history.

Fowler holds a BA in social science from the University of East Anglia, and an MA in archive administration from University College London. He was editor of Richmond History, the annual journal of the Richmond Local History Society, from 2015 to 2019 and was editor of Ancestors, the family history magazine of The National Archives (UK), from 2004 until it ceased publication in 2010. He edited Family History Monthly from 2000 to 2004. His history-related articles have appeared in Local History Magazine, Family Tree, History Today, BBC History Magazine and several academic journals.

He was an archivist at the Public Record Office, now The National Archives, for 20 years. He was secretary of Labour Heritage, the Labour Oral History Project and the Friendly Societies Research Group. He is also active with the London Archive Users Forum and the Brewery and Pub History societies.

== Works ==
=== As author ===
- (with William Spencer) Army Records for Family Historians (Public Record Office Readers' Guide), PRO Publications, 1998, ISBN 978-18731-6259-0
- At the Heart of the Community: Victoria House, Kew 1980–2020, The Friends of Victoria House, 2022, ISBN 978-1-3999-3512-8
- Family History: Digging Deeper, The History Press, 2012, ISBN 978-07524-5897-7
- Family History Starter Pack: All You Need to Begin Your Family History Research, The National Archives (UK), 2004, ISBN 978-19033-6569-4
- (with Ruth Paley) Family Skeletons: Exploring the lives of our disreputable ancestors, The National Archives (UK), 2005, ISBN 978-19033-6554-0
- A Guide to Military History on the Internet, Pen and Sword Books, 2007, ISBN 978-1-84415-606-1
- How to Research your Second World War Ancestors, The History Press, 2025, ISBN 978-1-8039-9449-9
- Joys of Family History: All You Need to Start Your Family Search, Public Record Office, 2002, ISBN 978-1903365311
- (with David Blomfield and Christopher May) Kew at War 1939–1945, Richmond Local History Society; fourth edition 2024, ISBN 978-1-912314-05-8
- Known Unto God: Searching for the Missing, Amberley Publishing, 2025, ISBN 978-13981-0366-5
- (with Daniel Weinbren) Now the War is Over: Britain 1919–1920, Pen and Sword Books, 2019, ISBN 978-14738-8597-4
- (with Derek Robinson) Old Palace Lane: Medieval to Modern Richmond, Museum of Richmond and Richmond Local History Society, 2017, ISBN 978-0-9550717-9-9; second edition 2020, ISBN 978-1-912314-00-3
- The Phil: A History of the Richmond Philanthropic Society, Richmond: Philanthropic Society, 1997 ISBN 978-0-9530-3100-9
- Philanthropy and the Poor Law in Richmond 1836–1871, Richmond Local History Society, 1991, ISBN 0-9508198-8-3; revised second edition published as Poverty and Philanthropy in Victorian Richmond, Richmond Local History Society, 2017 (reissued 2023), ISBN 978-1-912314-02-7
- Railway Disasters (Images of Transport), Wharncliffe Books, 2013, ISBN 978-1-84563-158-1
- Researching Brewery and Publican Ancestors, The Family History Partnership, 2009, ISBN 978-19062-8012-3
- Richmond at War 1939–1945, Richmond Local History Society, 2015, ISBN 978-0-9550717-8-2; second edition 2026, ISBN 978-1912-31406-5
- Richmond in the Census of 1851, Richmond Local History Society, 1988, ISBN 978-09508-1983-9
- (with David Thomas and Valerie Johnson) The Silence of the Archive (Principles and Practice in Records Management and Archives), Facet Publishing, 2017, ISBN 978-17833-0155-3
- Sources for Labour History (Public Record Office Readers' Guide), PRO Publications, 1996, ISBN 978-18731-6221-7
- Starting Out in Local History, Countryside Books, 2001, ISBN 978-18530-6686-3
- Tracing Irish Ancestors (Pocket Guides to Family History), Pen and Sword Books, 2001, ISBN 978-19033-6503-8
- Tracing Scottish Ancestors, PRO Publications, 2001, ISBN 978-19033-6502-1
- Tracing Your Ancestors, Pen and Sword Books, 2011, ISBN 978-18441-5948-2
- Tracing Your Army Ancestors, Pen and Sword Books, 2006, ISBN 978-1844-15410-4; second edition 2013, ISBN 978-18446-8669-8; third edition 2017 ISBN 978-14738-7636-1
- Tracing Your First World War Ancestors: A Guide for Family Historians, Countryside Books, 2008, ISBN 978-18467-4130-2; second edition, Pen and Sword Books, ISBN 978-13990-0039-0
- Tracing Your Great War Ancestors – The Gallipoli Campaign: A Guide for Family Historians, Pen and Sword Books, 2015, ISBN 978-14738-2368-6
- Tracing Your Great War Ancestors – The Somme: A Guide for Family Historians, Pen and Sword Books, 2015, ISBN 978-14738-2369-3
- Tracing Your Great War Ancestors – Ypres: A Guide for Family Historians, Pen and Sword Books, 2015, ISBN 978-14738-2370-9
- Tracing Your Naval Ancestors, Pen and Sword Books, 2011, ISBN 978-18488-4625-8
- Tracing Your Second World War Ancestors, Countryside Books, 2006, ISBN 978-18530-6936-9
- Using Poor Law Records (Pocket Guides to Family History), PRO Publications, 2001, ISBN 978-19033-6507-6
- The Workhouse: The People, The Places, The Life Behind Doors, The National Archives (UK), 2007, ISBN 978-19056-1503-2; second edition, Pen and Sword Books, 2014, ISBN 978-17838-3151-7

=== As editor ===
- (with Robert Smith) J M Lee: Petersham: radar and operational research 1940–1946, Richmond Local History Society, second edition 2024, ISBN 978-1-912314-04-1
