= Eighteenth-Century Ireland (journal) =

Eighteenth-Century Ireland or Iris an dá chultúr, is an annual, peer-reviewed academic journal of eighteenth century Ireland published on behalf of the Eighteenth-Century Ireland Society. The journal was established in 1986. Articles are in English, Irish, or French.

== Indexing and abstracting ==
The journal is indexed in the European Reference Index for the Humanities (ERIH) where it has a rating of INT1. Abstracts of volumes 1-13 are additionally available on the Eighteenth-Century Ireland Society website. The journal forms part of the JSTOR Ireland Collection.

== Reception ==
In reviewing the first edition in The Linen Hall Review in 1986, John C. Greene and Michelle O'Riordan argued that the journal came at a time when modern research was "leading to the history of eighteenth-century Ireland being rewritten on almost every front". Toby Barnard, in the Irish University Review also noted the timeliness of publication, seeing it as "a fresh sign of rising interest in that century". A.P.W. Malcomson, in Irish Historical Studies, described Eighteenth-Century Ireland as "filling an obvious void".

== Later volumes ==
Reviewing volumes four and five in Irish Historical Studies, Thomas Bartlett described Eighteenth-Century Ireland as "highly regarded" but noted its uneven quality and persistent problems with proof reading. The journal was also reviewed in Irish language publications such as Comhar.
