= Howard Erskine-Hill =

English literary scholar

- Born: Howard Henry Erskine-Hill; 19 June 1936; Wakefield, Yorkshire
- Died: 26 February 2014 (aged 77); Cambridge

Academic background
- Education: University of Nottingham
- Thesis: Tradition and Affinity in the Poetry of Pope (1961)

Academic work
- Discipline: English literature
- Institutions: University of Wales, Swansea (1960–1965); Jesus College, Cambridge (1965–1980); Pembroke College, Cambridge (1980–2003)
- Main interests: Alexander Pope

Howard Henry Erskine-Hill, FBA (19 June 1936 – 26 February 2014) was an English literary scholar most notable for his work on the eighteenth century poet Alexander Pope.

== Early life ==
He was born in Wakefield and studied at a Methodist boarding school in Harrogate, Ashville College. He was exempt from National Service due to his asthma and he studied English with philosophy at the University of Nottingham. He graduated with a BA in 1957 and then embarked on his PhD thesis (also at Nottingham), titled "Tradition and Affinity in the Poetry of Pope".

== Academic career ==
From 1960 to 1965 Erskine-Hill taught English at the University of Wales, Swansea, ending his time there as senior lecturer. From 1965 to 1984 he was a lecturer in English at Cambridge University, then reader (1984–94) and professor of literary history (1994–2003). From 1969 until 1980 he was a Fellow of Jesus College, Cambridge and in 1985 was elected Fellow of the British Academy, where he served on the publications committee (1987–94).

In 1964 Oxford University Press published Erskine-Hill's edition of Horace's Satires and Epistles. His Social Milieu of Alexander Pope was published by Yale University Press in 1975 and sought to place Pope's work in its historical context by analysing six figures who featured prominently in Pope's life and poetry. In his review, Donald Davie said the book was "one of those very rare books which truly deserve the description: humane scholarship. It is very learned indeed. ... [H]is book is a great achievement, and also a great pleasure. ... I do not know when literary scholarship in England came up with anything so deeply satisfying".

His next book, The Augustan Idea in English Literature, was published in 1983 and explored how writers from the time of Shakespeare to Pope used the Roman Emperor Augustus and his associated poets Virgil and Horace as a model to praise or criticise politics. Erskine-Hill explained in the preface:

The word ‘Idea’ in my title is not intended to suggest that the English reception of Rome's Augustan Age involved one idea alone, as it might be for example, of peaceful empire, or of enlightened patronage of poets. ‘Idea’ must perforce stand for a shifting pattern of ideas, some diametrically opposed, if pressed to their extreme forms. The grateful view of Virgil and Horace; the penetrating and hostile view of Tacitus; and the Christian providential view of Eusebius, each quite different from the others, are the major components of what may for the sake of brevity be termed the Augustan Idea. Separated out, they formed the arguments in a debate about the nature of Augustan Rome. Drawn together they composed a compound image in which compatibility was more evident than contradiction.

In the book's introduction he explained: "Evidence has been presented and conclusions based on that evidence. I acknowledge the principle of truth as the end of scholarship, and have no interest in the production of subjective myth in the guise of criticism, or in the mere multiplication of readings none of which has any greater probability than the rest". In his review, Frank Kermode complained of the "vanity" of Erskine-Hill's "mock-modest tone" in the introduction and said it was "quite deplorable" from "so pedestrian an author to put on such airs". Emrys Jones called it "an ambitious and impressive work" which was not only "exceptional in the scope and quality of its reading but deeply considered in what it has to say".

In 1992 Erskine-Hill unsuccessfully opposed Cambridge University's bestowal of an honorary degree on Jacques Derrida because he had derided the value of truth and that such academic recognition of Derrida would undermine educational standards. The pamphlet he wrote with Hugh Mellor exclaimed that "the major preoccupation and effect of [Derrida's] voluminous work has been to deny and to dissolve those standards of evidence and argument on which all academic disciples are based".

In order to commemorate the 250th anniversary of Pope's death, Erskine-Hill set up a symposium in May 1994. This led to him being appointed to give the Warton Lecture on "Pope and Slavery". This and other papers from the symposium were published in the Proceedings of the British Academy in 1998.

In 1996 Oxford University's Clarendon Press published his two companion volumes on the relationship between politics and literature from William Shakespeare to William Wordsworth, Poetry and the Realm of Politics and Poetry of Opposition and Revolution. He explained in the introduction to the first volume:

The chief contention of this book is that there is a political comment, often involving contemporary political ideas and historical circumstance, in some of the most powerful poetic works of sixteenth- and seventeenth-century English literature, works which have in the past been usually read for their aesthetic achievement and generalized wisdom. I argue that this political component is an eventual part of their aesthetic life, and that that, in its turn, is part of that wider historical culture which it is the vocation of scholarship to explore with as much imagination and disinterestedness as it can.

In 2008 Erskine-Hill's festschrift was published, edited by David Womersley and Richard McCabe. They said in the preface that Erskine-Hill's works "range from the most magisterial of research monographs to the most accessible of student introductions. ... In Howard the teacher and the scholar are one".

== Personal life ==
Erskine-Hill's political views were originally left-wing; he was a Labour voter and a supporter of the Campaign for Nuclear Disarmament but he moved to the right whilst at Cambridge. Although he voted for James Callaghan's Labour Party in 1979, he admired Margaret Thatcher's leadership during the Falklands War, during the 1983 general election he complained: "If you believe in democratic procedure and in defence, you cannot vote Labour this time. If you believe in government support for the economy and unemployment, you cannot vote Tory".

Later on he embraced Euroscepticism; in 1991 he wrote to Thatcher to try and dissuade her from retiring from the House of Commons so that she could lead the campaign against a federal Europe. He also supported her idea of a referendum on the subject. He later supported the UK Independence Party.

Throughout his life he was a supporter of Amnesty International.

Abandoning the atheism of his student days, he joined the Church of England. In 1994, after the Church of England decided to ordain women, he converted to the Roman Catholic Church.

== Works ==
- (editor), Pope: Horatian Satires and Epistles (Oxford: Oxford University Press, 1964).
- The Social Milieu of Alexander Pope: Lives, Example, and the Poetic Response (New Haven: Yale University Press, 1975). ISBN 0300018371
- The Augustan Idea in English Literature (London: Hodder Arnold, 1983). ISBN 0713163739
- Swift: Gulliver's Travels (Cambridge: Cambridge University Press, 1993). ISBN 0521338425
- Poetry and the Realm of Politics: Shakespeare to Dryden (Oxford: Clarendon Press, 1996). ISBN 0198117310
- Poetry of Opposition and Revolution: Dryden to Wordsworth (Oxford: Clarendon Press, 1997). ISBN 0198121776
