= Éamonn an Chnoic =

Traditional Irish ballad

"Éamonn an Chnoic" ("Ned of the Hill") is a popular Sean nos song in traditional Irish music. It is a slow, mournful ballad with a somber theme and no chorus.

The song is attributed to Éamonn Ó Riain (Edmund O'Ryan) (d. c. 1724), an early 18th-century County Tipperary folk hero, composer of Irish bardic poetry, and rapparee; an outlawed Jacobite from the Gaelic nobility of Ireland who still held to the code of conduct of the traditional chiefs of the Irish clans. Folk song researcher Donal O'Sullivan has written that Captain Edmund O'Ryan's, "gay chivalry, daring exploits, and 'moving accidents by flood and field' would indeed make fine material for a historical novel."

== Life ==
According to James Clarence Mangan, O'Ryan was born in Shanbohy, in the civil parish of Templebeg (Irish: An Teampall Beag), in the half-barony of Kilnamanagh Upper in Tipperary, "previous to the wars of 1690". Stephen Dunford, however, gives his birthplace as Atshanbohy, in the same civil parish. Donal O'Sullivan, on the other hand, gives his birthplace as the castle upon Cnoc Maothail, a hill 828 feet high in Templebeg and, for this reason he was always known as Éamonn an Chnuic, or Edmund of the Hill. For similar reasons, his sister was known as "Sally of the Hill", (Irish: Sadhbh an Chnuic).

His father's family was descended from the derbhfine of the last Chief of the Name of Clan O'Ryan and Lord of Kilnalongurty; but his ancestors had lost their ancestral lands fighting for the Hiberno-Norman Fitzgerald dynasty during the Elizabethan era Desmond Rebellions. O'Ryan's mother was from the derbhfine of the last Chief of the Name of Clan O'Dwyer and Lord of Upper and Lower Kilnamanagh.

O'Ryan was educated in Catholic Europe and intended for the priesthood, but "by an affair in which he took a prominent part" had to relinquish that plan. It is said that, during a visit home, O'Ryan was outlawed after shooting a bailiff dead during a quarrel over the confiscation of an elderly and poor woman's only cow.

A further background to Captain O'Ryan's career was the confiscation of Royalist-owned land after the Cromwellian conquest of Ireland in the Act of Settlement 1652, upon which when many similarly dispossessed Cavaliers also became outlaws, known as "tories" or "rapparees".

According to Stephen Dunford, "Ned ranged over his native parish in the aftermath of the shooting. Hunted night and day, he embarked upon a one man crusade against the foreign landlords and authorities. He robbed, he plundered, he disturbed the peace of the area."

In one story, O'Ryan held up an Anglo-Irish woman's coach on the road to Dublin. Upon learning, however, that the £100 was all the woman possessed for her living expenses until her husband returned from England, O'Ryan took only half a crown from the woman's purse and returned the rest. He then told her, "It is Ned of the Hill that has robbed you, madam, and not some common criminal. Be sure to say that when you recount this incident."

Moments later, O'Ryan is said to have been robbed at gunpoint by Count Redmond O'Hanlon, before turning the tables on the outlaw Count and defeating him in a wrestling match. The two outlaws then parted as friends.

During the Williamite War of 1689-91, Éamonn O'Ryan fought for King James II at the Battle of the Boyne and the Battle of Aughrim. O'Ryan also accompanied Patrick Sarsfield and Galloping Hogan during the raid that resulted in the destruction of the William of Orange's siege train at Ballyneety.

Author and poet Robert Dwyer Joyce would later dub Edmund O'Ryan, "one of the noblest gentlemen and bravest Rapparee captains that ever drew sword or shook bridle free in the cause of worthless, war-minded King James the Second."

During the first siege of Limerick, O'Ryan's cousin, Hugh O'Ryan, also known as "Hugh of Glenurra", was killed in action during an ambush of Williamite troops at the Bridge of Tern. Éamonn O'Ryan, while accompanied by at least one other relative, is said to have subsequently avenged his cousin.

After the Treaty of Limerick, most of the defeated Jacobite Army sailed from Limerick City and joined the Flight of the Wild Geese.

According to Donal O'Sullivan, "Most, but by no means all. Some of the most gallant and intrepid remained behind to carry on an independent fight by every means in their power: constantly raiding the encampments of the English soldiery, harassing its lines of communication, and retreating into their hideouts in the hills, each man of them with a price in his head. They were known as Rapparees (Irish: Ropairí) - what we should now call an underground movement; and one of the most heroic of them all was Edmund Ryan of the Hill."

Along with fellow raparees Colonel John Hurley, Colonel Dermot Leary, Captain Matthew Higgins and John Murphy, O'Ryan issued a proclamation in December 1694, denouncing all those disloyal to King James II, offered a reward of £200 to anyone who brought to them any member of William of Orange's privy council and a further bounty of £50 to anyone who delivered to them a military officer still in arms against the House of Stuart.

According to Donal O'Sullivan, "Precise dates are for the most part lacking; but there existed in the former Irish Record Office (destroyed with all its contents in the Civil War of 1922) a Government Proclamation, dated 1702, offering £200 for the apprehension of 'Edmund Knock Ryan.'"

== Personal life ==
Despite being constantly on the run, Éamonn O'Ryan, according to the local oral tradition, found time to fall in love and get married. While roving through Ulster and Leinster, Éamonn O'Ryan met Mary Leahy. O'Ryan secretly wooed Leahy while posing as a wandering composer and singer of Irish bardic poetry and, ultimately, they eloped from the feast celebrating Mary Leahy's imminent wedding to another man. Éamonn O'Ryan is said to have composed for Mary both the song that is now named for him and love song Bean Dubh an Ghleanna.

While no records to confirm their marriage now survive, Éamonn and Mary O'Ryan are said to have had a son, who was taken in and raised by a sympathetic woman from the local Anglo-Irish gentry and later became a respected local merchant. Their grandson is said to have become magistrate at the Leinster Assizes, who was known as Judge Mountain.

== Death ==
After many strange vicissitudes, O'Ryan arrived at the Hollyford (Áth an Chuilinn) home of his kinsman Tomás Bán Ó Dubhuir, also known as Dubhuir Broc ("Badger Dwyer"), on a rainy evening in 1724. O'Ryan had been pursued for two days by a posse of redcoats and was exhausted. Even though O'Ryan had stood godfather at the baptism of his son, Dwyer let him in and, hoping to collect the £300 reward, beheaded O'Ryan with a hatchet while he slept. Upon bringing the severed head to the county seat of Cashel (Irish: Caiseal), however, Dwyer learned to his chagrin that O'Ryan had been pardoned two days previously and that no reward would be given. Even so, O'Ryan's severed head was confiscated and displayed spiked upon Cashel Gaol for several days, until some local men removed the head and delivered it to the former outlaw's sister, Sally O'Ryan.

According to the local oral tradition, O'Ryan's body lies buried at Doon (Irish: Dún Bleisce), while his sister, Sally O'Ryan of the Hill, buried her brother's severed head in the Catholic cemetery at Foilachluig, in the civil parish of Toem, in the half barony of Kilnamanagh Upper, near the site of his assassination at Hollyford. According to Mangan, "the precise spot is marked on sheet 45 of the Ordnance Survey of Tipperary as the grave of Eamonn an Chnoic."

In 1962, the grave was found to have been dug up. What was believed to be O'Ryan's skull was taken to the nearest Catholic Church, blessed, and then reburied. In 1963, Matthew Ryan, a relative of the outlaw and retired officer in the United States Navy, erected a tombstone:

"Edmund Knock Ryan Ned O' the Hill
Éamman an Chnoic
His spirit and song live in the hearts of his people."

== Song variants ==
The song is usually sung in Irish, but various English versions are popular as well. Other versions also highlight the failure of Ó Riain's countrymen to come to rally to his defence and more strongly emphasize that Ó Riain had been a man of wealth and influence.

"Éamonn an Chnoic" has been recorded by countless artists in both English and Irish. Some versions, such as the "Young Ned of the Hill" recorded by The Pogues, adapt the lyrics to a fast-tempo song with only a passing similarity to the original folk song. Completely instrumental versions are also common.

== See also ==
- Colonel John Hurley
- Irish rebel songs
