= List of European tornadoes in 2011 =

This is a list of all tornadoes that were confirmed throughout Europe by the European Severe Storms Laboratory and local meteorological agencies during 2011. Unlike the United States, the original Fujita Scale and the TORRO scale are used to rank tornadoes across the continent.

== European yearly total ==
Tornadoes by Country
Country	Total	F?	F0	F1	F2	F3	F4	F5
Austria	2	0	1	1	0	0	0	0
Belgium	1	0	1	0	0	0	0	0
Bulgaria	1	0	1	0	0	0	0	0
Cyprus	1	0	0	1	0	0	0	0
Czech Republic	2	0	1	1	0	0	0	0
Denmark	1	0	0	1	0	0	0	0
France	3	0	1	1	1	0	0	0
Germany	33	13	1	6	2	0	0	0
Greece	5	1	1	1	2	0	0	0
Hungary	1	0	1	0	0	0	0	0
Italy	13	6	4	2	1	0	0	0
Norway	3	0	1	1	1	0	0	0
Poland	5	1	2	1	1	0	0	0
Portugal	1	0	0	1	0	0	0	0
Russia	6	3	0	2	1	0	0	0
Spain	4	4	0	0	0	0	0	0
Switzerland	1	1	0	0	0	0	0	0
Sweden	4	0	2	2	0	0	0	0
Turkey	9	4	1	4	0	0	0	0
Ukraine	3	2	0	0	1	0	0	0
United Kingdom	7	1	2	4	0	0	0	0
Lithuania	2	1	0	0	1	0	0	0
Totals	107	37	22	27	10	0	0	0

== January ==
=== January 1 event ===
List of reported tornadoes - Saturday, January 1, 2011
F#	T#	Location	District/ County	Coord.	Time (UTC)	Path length	Comments/Damage
Russia
F?	T?	Kotovka	Nizjnij Novgorod	55.30°N 42.77°E	0000	Unknown	
Sources: ESSL Severe Weather Database

=== January 24 event ===
List of reported tornadoes - Monday, January 24, 2011
F#	T#	Location	District/ County	Coord.	Time (UTC)	Path length	Comments/Damage
Greece
F2	T?	Marista area	Dodecanese	36.37°N 28.15°E	1130	Unknown	A few structures were destroyed, numerous olive trees were uprooted and a few cows were killed.
Turkey
F1	T?	NE of Kemalpaşa	İzmir	38.41°N 27.41°E	1630	Unknown	An industrial building sustained significant damage, fences were blown over and trees uprooted.
Sources: ESSL Severe Weather Database

=== January 25 event ===
List of reported tornadoes - Tuesday, January 25, 2011
F#	T#	Location	District/ County	Coord.	Time (UTC)	Path length	Comments/Damage
Turkey
F1	T?	Tuzburgazı area	Aydın	36.62°N 27.22°E	1330	4 kilometres (2.5 mi)	A 100 m (330 ft) wide waterspout moved onshore and snapped/uprooted trees.
Sources: ESSL Severe Weather Database

== February ==
=== February 2 event ===
List of reported tornadoes - Wednesday, February 2, 2011
F#	T#	Location	District/ County	Coord.	Time (UTC)	Path length	Comments/Damage
Turkey
F0	T?	Çayeli area	Rize	41.09°N 40.73°E	1230	Unknown	A waterspout moved ashore over a local beach.
Sources: ESSL Severe Weather Database

=== February 16 event ===
List of reported tornadoes - Wednesday, February 16, 2011
F#	T#	Location	District/ County	Coord.	Time (UTC)	Path length	Comments/Damage
Portugal
F1	T?	Águas de Moura	Setúbal	38.56°N 8.64°W	0500	Unknown	Tornado damaged homes, trees and cars
Sources: ESSL Severe Weather Database

=== February 19 event ===
List of reported tornadoes - Saturday, February 19, 2011
F#	T#	Location	District/ County	Coord.	Time (UTC)	Path length	Comments/Damage
Turkey
F1	T?	Kargıpınarı area	Mersin	36.70°N 34.42°E	1330	4 kilometres (2.5 mi)	Tornado damaged several homes, severely damaging or removing roofs. One person was injured by the storm.
Sources: ESSL Severe Weather Database

=== February 23 event ===
List of reported tornadoes - Wednesday, February 23, 2011
F#	T#	Location	District/ County	Coord.	Time (UTC)	Path length	Comments/Damage
Greece
F2	T?	South Rhodes	Rhodes	36.02°N 27.93°E	1320	Unknown	A restaurant was destroyed and several homes sustained damage.
Sources: ESSL Severe Weather Database

=== February 24 event ===
List of reported tornadoes - Thursday, February 24, 2011
F#	T#	Location	District/ County	Coord.	Time (UTC)	Path length	Comments/Damage
Greece
F0	T?	Hora Sfakion area	Crete	35.20°N 24.14°E	1438	Unknown	A waterspout briefly moved onshore before dissipating.
Sources: ESSL Severe Weather Database

=== February 25 event ===
List of reported tornadoes - Friday, February 25, 2011
F#	T#	Location	District/ County	Coord.	Time (UTC)	Path length	Comments/Damage
Greece
F?	T?	Archángelos	Rhodes	35.20°N 24.14°E	1215	2 kilometres (1.2 mi)	Confirmed but unrated tornado. About 400 olive trees were damaged
Sources: ESSL Severe Weather Database

== March ==
=== March 21 event ===
List of reported tornadoes - Monday, March 21, 2011
F#	T#	Location	District/ County	Coord.	Time (UTC)	Path length	Comments/Damage
Spain
F?	T?	Zafra	Extremadura	38.42°N 6.42°W	1700	Unknown	
Sources: ESSL Severe Weather Database

== April ==
=== April 2 event ===
List of reported tornadoes - Saturday, April 2, 2011
F#	T#	Location	District/ County	Coord.	Time (UTC)	Path length	Comments/Damage
Cyprus
F1	T2	N of Lapithos	Kyrenia	35.35°N 33.18°E	0830	Unknown	A few homes sustained roof damage and several cars were damaged by flying debris.
Sources: ESSL Severe Weather Database

=== April 5 event ===
List of reported tornadoes - Tuesday, April 5, 2011
F#	T#	Location	District/ County	Coord.	Time (UTC)	Path length	Comments/Damage
Russia
F?	T?	Seversky	Krasnodarskiy	44.85°N 38.68°E	0700	Unknown	Confirmed but unrated tornado
Sources: ESSL Severe Weather Database

=== April 8 event ===
List of reported tornadoes - Friday, April 8, 2011
F#	T#	Location	District/ County	Coord.	Time (UTC)	Path length	Comments/Damage
Sweden
F0	T1	Åtvidaberg	Östergötland	58.20°N 16.00°E	1345	Unknown	Several homes sustained roof damage and trees were downed
F1	T3	Oskarshamn	Kalmar	57.26°N 16.44°E	1400	Unknown	Several homes were damaged and multiple trees were uprooted
Sources: ESSL Severe Weather Database

=== April 28 event ===
List of reported tornadoes - Thursday, April 28, 2011
F#	T#	Location	District/ County	Coord.	Time (UTC)	Path length	Comments/Damage
Germany
F1	T3	Kirchberg area	Lower Saxony	51.85°N 10.15°E	1150	0.6 kilometres (0.37 mi)	Brief tornado damaged 20 homes along its path. Average path width was 20 m (66 ft).
Sources: ESSL Severe Weather Database

=== April 30 event ===
List of reported tornadoes - Saturday, April 30, 2011
F#	T#	Location	District/ County	Coord.	Time (UTC)	Path length	Comments/Damage
Hungary
F0	T?	Érpatak area	Szabolcs-Szatmár-Bereg	47.80°N 21.77°E	1240	Unknown	Brief tornado with no damage
Bulgaria
F0	T?	Kubrat area	Razgrad	43.79°N 26.51°E	1600	Unknown	Brief tornado with no damage
Sources: ESSL Severe Weather Database

== May ==
=== May 12 event ===
List of reported tornadoes - Thursday, May 12, 2011
F#	T#	Location	District/ County	Coord.	Time (UTC)	Path length	Comments/Damage
Germany
F1	T3	SW of Apolda	Thuringia	51.00°N 11.44°E	1238	1.5 kilometres (0.93 mi)	Tornado moved through mostly open fields; however, a 22 m (72 ft) tall tree with a trunk diameter of 0.45 m (1.5 ft) was snapped.
Sources: ESSL Severe Weather Database

=== May 14 event ===
List of reported tornadoes - Saturday, May 14, 2011
F#	T#	Location	District/ County	Coord.	Time (UTC)	Path length	Comments/Damage
Austria
F0	T1	Müllendorf area (1st tornado)	Eisenstadt-Umgebung	47.83°N 16.45°E	1335	Unknown	First of two tornado in Müllendorf damaged a few trees.
F1	T3	Müllendorf area (2nd tornado)	Eisenstadt-Umgebung	47.83°N 16.45°E	1335	1.6 kilometres (0.99 mi)	A tornado damaged 17 homes and downed many trees along its path.
Russia
F1	T?	Sarafanovo area	Chelyabinsk	54.89°N 60.27°E	1355	Unknown	Several homes were damaged and a few power lines were downed.
Sources: ESSL Severe Weather Database

=== May 15 event ===
List of reported tornadoes - Sunday, May 15, 2011
F#	T#	Location	District/ County	Coord.	Time (UTC)	Path length	Comments/Damage
Italy
F1	T?	Grosseto	Tuscany	42.77°N 11.11°E	1600	Unknown	Specifics unknown
Russia
F1	T?	S of Tochilino	Kemerovo	53.70°N 87.12°E	1900	Unknown	Severe roof damage to several homes, numerous windows blown out and many telephone lines downed.
Sources: ESSL Severe Weather Database

=== May 16 event ===
List of reported tornadoes - Monday, May 16, 2011
F#	T#	Location	District/ County	Coord.	Time (UTC)	Path length	Comments/Damage
Norway
F0	T?	Forus area	Rogaland	58.88°N 5.75°E	0600	Unknown	Brief tornado observed near or over a lake
Sources: ESSL Severe Weather Database

=== May 18 event ===
List of reported tornadoes - Wednesday, May 18, 2011
F#	T#	Location	District/ County	Coord.	Time (UTC)	Path length	Comments/Damage
Turkey
F?	T?	Gövelek	Van Province	38.53°N 43.62°E	1900	3 kilometres (1.9 mi)	Tornado damaged homes and snapped trees and power lines
Sources: ESSL Severe Weather Database

=== May 19 event ===
List of reported tornadoes - Thursday, May 19, 2011
F#	T#	Location	District/ County	Coord.	Time (UTC)	Path length	Comments/Damage
Ukraine
F?	T?	Yasinya	Zakarpattia	48.27°N 24.36°E	1445	Unknown	
Russia
F?	T?	Озёрск	Chelyabinsk	55.80°N 60.75°E	1745	Unknown	
Sources: ESSL Severe Weather Database

=== May 21 event ===
List of reported tornadoes - Saturday, May 21, 2011
F#	T#	Location	District/ County	Coord.	Time (UTC)	Path length	Comments/Damage
Poland
F0	T?	Police Mostowe	Greater Poland	52.13°N 18.65°E	1400	Unknown	Brief rope tornado
Sources: ESSL Severe Weather Database

=== May 26 event ===
List of reported tornadoes - Thursday, May 26, 2011
F#	T#	Location	District/ County	Coord.	Time (UTC)	Path length	Comments/Damage
Turkey
F1	T3	Damal	Ardahan	41.33°N 42.84°E	1130	Unknown	Tornado damaged several homes, some of which lost their roofs, and downed power lines.
Germany
F?	T?	Neustadt in Holstein	Schleswig-Holstein		1635	Unknown	Tornado struck a boat show, tossing several tents and tearing boats from their moorings. Five people were injured
Sources: ESSL Severe Weather Database

=== May 27 event ===
List of reported tornadoes - Friday, May 27, 2011
F#	T#	Location	District/ County	Coord.	Time (UTC)	Path length	Comments/Damage
Italy
F?	T?	Cerro Veronese	Veneto	45.57°N 11.04°E	1300	Unknown	Tornado caused significant damage in Cerro Veronese. Debris reported to have littered the streets.
Sources: ESSL Severe Weather Database

=== May 28 event ===
List of reported tornadoes - Saturday, May 28, 2011
F#	T#	Location	District/ County	Coord.	Time (UTC)	Path length	Comments/Damage
Czech Republic
F0	T0	Říčany	Central Bohemian	49.99°N 14.65°E	1930	Unknown	Short-lived tornado or gustnado
Sources: ESSL Severe Weather Database

== June ==
=== June 4 event ===
List of reported tornadoes - Saturday, June 4, 2011
F#	T#	Location	District/ County	Coord.	Time (UTC)	Path length	Comments/Damage
Sweden
F1	T?	NE of Västanbäck	Västernorrland	63.45°N 16.91°E	0815	1.5 kilometres (0.93 mi)	Tornado downed numerous trees in a forested area
Sources: ESSL Severe Weather Database

=== June 5 event ===
List of reported tornadoes - Sunday, June 5, 2011
F#	T#	Location	District/ County	Coord.	Time (UTC)	Path length	Comments/Damage
Italy
F1	T3	Bientina	Tuscany	43.71°N 10.62°E	1430	Unknown	Several homes were damaged, some with portions of their roof missing, and multiple trees were uprooted.
Sources: ESSL Severe Weather Database

=== June 6 event ===
List of reported tornadoes - Monday, June 6, 2011
F#	T#	Location	District/ County	Coord.	Time (UTC)	Path length	Comments/Damage
Germany
F0	T1	Bad Nauheim	Hesse	50.37°N 8.72°E	1102	0.12 kilometres (0.075 mi)	Brief tornado flattened a small area of crops
Belgium
F0	T?	Koersel	Limburg	51.07°N 5.27°E	1750	Unknown	Brief tornado with minor damage
Sources: ESSL Severe Weather Database

=== June 8 event ===
List of reported tornadoes - Wednesday, June 8, 2011
F#	T#	Location	District/ County	Coord.	Time (UTC)	Path length	Comments/Damage
Northern Ireland
F1	T2	Eglinton	County Londonderry	55.02°N 7.18°W	1400	Unknown	Short-lived tornado tore the roof off a barn and flipped a car
Sources: ESSL Severe Weather Database

=== June 9 event ===
List of reported tornadoes - Thursday, June 9, 2011
F#	T#	Location	District/ County	Coord.	Time (UTC)	Path length	Comments/Damage
France
F0	T?	Creney-près-Troyes	Champagne-Ardenne	48.33°N 4.13°E	1030	Unknown	Brief tornado
Sources: ESSL Severe Weather Database

=== June 14 event ===
List of reported tornadoes - Tuesday, June 14, 2011
F#	T#	Location	District/ County	Coord.	Time (UTC)	Path length	Comments/Damage
Ukraine
F2	T4	Kostiantynivka	Zaporizhzhia	46.84°N 35.37°E	1515	Unknown	More than 60 houses damaged.
Sources: ESSL Severe Weather Database

=== June 16 event ===
List of reported tornadoes - Thursday, June 16, 2011
F#	T#	Location	District/ County	Coord.	Time (UTC)	Path length	Comments/Damage
Sweden
F0	T?	Sexdrega	Västra Götaland	57.58°N 13.12°E	1415	Unknown	Slight damage
Sources: ESSL Severe Weather Database

=== June 21 event ===
List of reported tornadoes - Tuesday, June 21, 2011
F#	T#	Location	District/ County	Coord.	Time (UTC)	Path length	Comments/Damage
Germany
F1	T?	Seiffen	Saxony		1424		
F?	T?	Olbernhau	Saxony		1425	14 kilometres (8.7 mi)	
F?	T?	Salzfurtkapelle	Saxony-Anhalt		1606		
F?	T?	Radebeul	Saxony		1856		
F?	T?	Rothenburg	Saxony		1914		
Czech Republic
F1	T3	Staré Čivice	Pardubický Kraj	50.02°N 15.68°E	1509	9 kilometres (5.6 mi)	Suction vortices observed.
Sources: ESSL Severe Weather Database

=== June 22 event ===
List of reported tornadoes - Wednesday, June 22, 2011
F#	T#	Location	District/ County	Coord.	Time (UTC)	Path length	Comments/Damage
Germany
F?	T?	Mittelbrunn	Rhineland-Palatinate		Unknown		
F2	T4	Altenlotheim	Hessen	51.13°N 8.92°E	1410	0.8 kilometres (0.50 mi)	Path width of 90 metres (300 ft).
F?	T?	Pilgerzell	Hessen		Unknown		
F1	T?	Rothemann	Hessen		Unknown		
F2	T?	Tambach-Dietharz	Thuringia		Unknown		
F?	T?	Eibenstock	Saxony		Unknown		
F?	T?	Holleben	Saxony-Anhalt		1630		
F1	T?	Gröbers	Saxony-Anhalt		1645		
F1	T3	Dölzig	Saxony	51.35°N 12.22°E	1700	4 kilometres (2.5 mi)	Several trees downed
F?	T?	Zschernitz	Saxony		Unknown		
F?	T?	Bitterfeld	Saxony-Anhalt		Unknown		
F?	T?	Sandersdorf	Saxony-Anhalt		1750		
F?	T?	Weyarn	Bavaria		1915		
Sources: ESSL Severe Weather Database

=== June 24 event ===
List of reported tornadoes - Friday, June 24, 2011
F#	T#	Location	District/ County	Coord.	Time (UTC)	Path length	Comments/Damage
Poland
F0	T?	Tyszowce	Lubelskie	50.62°N 23.70°E	1830	Unknown	Little damage
Sources: ESSL Severe Weather Database

=== June 30 event ===
List of reported tornadoes - Thursday, June 30, 2011
F#	T#	Location	District/ County	Coord.	Time (UTC)	Path length	Comments/Damage
Poland
F1	T2	Bydgoszcz	Kujawsko-Pomorskie	53.15°N 28.00°E	1700	Unknown	Possible gustnado
Sources: ESSL Severe Weather Database

== July ==
=== July 2 event ===
List of reported tornadoes - Saturday, July 2, 2011
F#	T#	Location	District/ County	Coord.	Time (UTC)	Path length	Comments/Damage
Italy
F0	T?	Punta Marina	Emilia-Romagna	44.44°N 12.30°E	0100	0.5 km (0.31 mi)	Waterspout briefly moved onshore
Sources: ESSL Severe Weather Database

=== July 8 event ===
List of reported tornadoes - Friday, July 8, 2011
F#	T#	Location	District/ County	Coord.	Time (UTC)	Path length	Comments/Damage
United Kingdom
F1	T2	Westhoughton	Greater Manchester	53.55°N 2.52°W	1445	0.5 km (0.31 mi)	No major damage has been reported.
Sources: ESSL Severe Weather Database

=== July 27 event ===
List of reported tornadoes - Wednesday, July 27, 2011
F#	T#	Location	District/ County	Coord.	Time (UTC)	Path length	Comments/Damage
Lithuania
F2	T6	Radviliškis	Radviliškis–Šiauliai	55.87°N 23.41°E	11:15	15 km (9.3 mi)	The tornado caused significant localized damage to the town of Radviliškis.

=== July 31 event ===
List of reported tornadoes - Sunday, July 31, 2011
F#	T#	Location	District/ County	Coord.	Time (UTC)	Path length	Comments/Damage
Russia
F2	T4	Blagoveshchensk	Amur Oblast	50.27°N 127.53°E	0945	13 km (8.1 mi)	A rare and highly destructive multi-vortex F2 tornado tore directly through the city center of Blagoveshchensk. The tornado overturned large vehicles, tore roofs off of numerous residential and commercial buildings, and snapped heavy concrete power poles. Hundreds of trees were uprooted. One person was killed, 28 others were injured, and total damages reached over 80 million rubles. It is documented as one of the few severe tornadoes to hit a major Russian city center directly.

== August ==
=== August 1 event ===
List of reported tornadoes - Monday, August 1, 2011
F#	T#	Location	District/ County	Coord.	Time (UTC)	Path length	Comments/Damage
Ukraine
F?	T?	Krasne	Crimea	45.14°N 34.09°E	1200	Unknown	Event lasted 4 minutes.
Poland
F?	T?	Ustronie Morskie	Zachodniopomorskie	54.22°N 15.75°E	1245	Unknown	
Sources: ESSL Severe Weather Database

=== August 22 event ===
List of reported tornadoes - Monday, August 22, 2011
F#	T#	Location	District/ County	Coord.	Time (UTC)	Path length	Comments/Damage
Norway
F0	T?	Fløen	Bergen kommune	60.38°N 5.37°E	1300	0.3 kilometres (0.19 mi)	Weak and brief multiple-vortex tornado appeared in a forested terrain outside Fløen, Bergen suburb. No damage known.
Poland
F2	T4	Równiaki	Lublin Voivodeship	50.86°N 22.94°E	1600	7 kilometres (4.3 mi)	A 200 m (660 ft) wide Rain-wrapped Low-end F2/T4 tornado struck farm and residential areas. Several barns was destroyed completely. Roofs were damaged, one of which were half destroyed. Trees were damaged, including a snapped pine tree.
Switzerland
FU	TU	Payerne	Canton of Vaud	46.82°N 6.93°E	1900	1 kilometre (0.62 mi)	An Unrated narrow tornado caused damage in Payerne.
Sources: ESSL Severe Weather Database

== October ==
=== October 9 event ===
List of reported tornadoes - Sunday, October 9, 2011
F#	T#	Location	District/ County	Coord.	Time (UTC)	Path length	Comments/Damage
Italy
F0	T?	Monopoli (1st tornado)	Bari	40.96°N 17.29°E	1500	Unknown	First of two waterspouts that moved onshore near Monopoli. Two other waterspouts were confirmed but neither moved over land.
F0	T?	Monopoli (2nd tornado)	Bari	40.96°N 17.29°E	1500	Unknown	Second of two waterspouts that moved onshore near Monopoli
Sources: ESSL Severe Weather Database

=== October 10 event ===
List of reported tornadoes - Monday, October 10, 2011
F#	T#	Location	District/ County	Coord.	Time (UTC)	Path length	Comments/Damage
Turkey
F2	T?	Kayacik	Manisa	38.90°N 28.17°E	1030	Unknown	One home was destroyed and numerous trees were snapped or uprooted.
Sources: ESSL Severe Weather Database

=== October 25 event ===
List of reported tornadoes - Tuesday, October 25, 2011
F#	T#	Location	District/ County	Coord.	Time (UTC)	Path length	Comments/Damage
France
F1	T3	Sanary-sur-Mer	Provence-Alpes-Côte d'Azur	43.12°N 5.79°E	0530	3 km (1.9 mi)	Many trees snapped and roofs damaged.
Sources: ESSL Severe Weather Database

== November ==
=== November 3 event ===
List of reported tornadoes - Thursday, November 3, 2011
F#	T#	Location	District/ County	Coord.	Time (UTC)	Path length	Comments/Damage
France
F2	T4	Anduze	Gard	44.05°N 3.98°E	2215	13 kilometres (8.1 mi)	Multiple trees downed and roofs damaged
Sources: ESSL Severe Weather Database

=== November 7 event ===
List of reported tornadoes - Monday, November 7, 2011
F#	T#	Location	District/ County	Coord.	Time (UTC)	Path length	Comments/Damage
Italy
F0	T?	Rome	Lazio	41.90°N 12.48°E	1500		
Sources: ESSL Severe Weather Database

=== November 15 event ===
List of reported tornadoes - Tuesday, November 15, 2011
F#	T#	Location	District/ County	Coord.	Time (UTC)	Path length	Comments/Damage
Cyprus
F1	T?	Karavas	Kyrenia	35.34°N 33.20°E	1400	Unknown	Tornado downed trees and power lines. Several greenhouses were also damaged.
Sources: ESSL Severe Weather Database

=== November 19 event ===
List of reported tornadoes - Saturday, 19 November 2011
F#	T#	Location	District/ County	Coord.	Time (UTC)	Path length	Comments/Damage
Spain
F?	T?	Jimena de la Frontera	Andalucía	36.43°N 5.45°W	1400		
Sources: ESSL Severe Weather Database

=== November 21 event ===
List of reported tornadoes - Monday, November 19, 2011
F#	T#	Location	District/ County	Coord.	Time (UTC)	Path length	Comments/Damage
Spain
F?	T?	Alacant	Comunitat Valenciana	38.34°N 0.48°W	0630		
F?	T?	Almuradiel	Castilla-La Mancha	38.52°N 3.50°W	1630		
Sources: ESSL Severe Weather Database

=== November 22 event ===
List of reported tornadoes - Tuesday, November 22, 2011
F#	T#	Location	District/ County	Coord.	Time (UTC)	Path length	Comments/Damage
Italy
F?	T?	Budoni	Sardegna	40.72°N 9.74°E	0900		
Sources: ESSL Severe Weather Database

=== November 29 event ===
List of reported tornadoes - Tuesday, November 29, 2011
F#	T#	Location	District/ County	Coord.	Time (UTC)	Path length	Comments/Damage
United Kingdom
F1	T2	Llanfwrog	Anglesey	53.10°N 3.32°W	1200	Unknown	Caravans tossed 50 feet away.
F0	T?	Stockport	Greater Manchester	53.41°N 2.16°W	1430	Unknown	One person taken to hospital.
F1	T?	Rossington	South Yorkshire	53.47°N 1.07°W	1500	Unknown	
F1	T?	Breighton	East Riding of Yorkshire	53.81°N 0.92°W	1515	10.5 kilometres (6.5 mi)	
Sources: ESSL Severe Weather Database

== December ==
=== December 3 event ===
List of reported tornadoes - Saturday, December 3, 2011
F#	T#	Location	District/ County	Coord.	Time (UTC)	Path length	Comments/Damage
Italy
F?	T?	Alghero	Sardegna	40.56°N 8.32°E	1200	Unknown	
F?	T?	Camaiore	Toscana	43.91°N 10.24°E	1215	Unknown	
Sources: ESSL Severe Weather Database

=== December 4 event ===
List of reported tornadoes - Sunday, December 4, 2011
F#	T#	Location	District/ County	Coord.	Time (UTC)	Path length	Comments/Damage
Italy
F?	T?	Alghero	Sardegna	40.56°N 8.32°E	1200	Unknown	

=== December 12 event ===
List of reported tornadoes - Monday, December 12, 2011
F#	T#	Location	District/ County	Coord.	Time (UTC)	Path length	Comments/Damage
United Kingdom
F?	T?	Coundon	County Durham	54.67°N 1.65°W	1845	Unknown	

=== December 14 event ===
List of reported tornadoes - Wednesday, December 14, 2011
F#	T#	Location	District/ County	Coord.	Time (UTC)	Path length	Comments/Damage
Denmark
F1	T3	Havneby	Syddanmark	55.08°N 8.57°E	0530	Unknown	

=== December 16 event ===
List of reported tornadoes - Friday, December 16, 2011
F#	T#	Location	District/ County	Coord.	Time (UTC)	Path length	Comments/Damage
Turkey
F?	T?	Fethiye		36.30°N 29.30°E	1700	Unknown	

=== December 23 event ===
List of reported tornadoes - Friday, December 23, 2011
F#	T#	Location	District/ County	Coord.	Time (UTC)	Path length	Comments/Damage
Turkey
F?	T?	Kumluca	Antalya	36.37°N 30.30°E	0400	Unknown	Greenhouses damaged.

=== December 24 event ===
List of reported tornadoes - Saturday, December 24, 2011
F#	T#	Location	District/ County	Coord.	Time (UTC)	Path length	Comments/Damage
Turkey
F?	T?	Gazipaşa	Koro Quarter Antalya	36.27°N 32.31°E	1430	Unknown	Greenhouses damaged.

=== December 25 event ===
List of reported tornadoes - Sunday, December 25, 2011
F#	T#	Location	District/ County	Coord.	Time (UTC)	Path length	Comments/Damage
Norway
F2	T?	Hellesylt	Møre og Romsdal	62.08°N 6.90°E	1900	Unknown	Camping trailers lifted, trailer park houses blown away. This tornado was caused by Cyclone Dagmar.

== See also ==
- Tornadoes of 2011
