= Eglinton, County Londonderry =

Village in County Londonderry, Northern Ireland

Coordinates: 55.040397°N 7.175047°W

Eglinton: Irish: An Mhagh
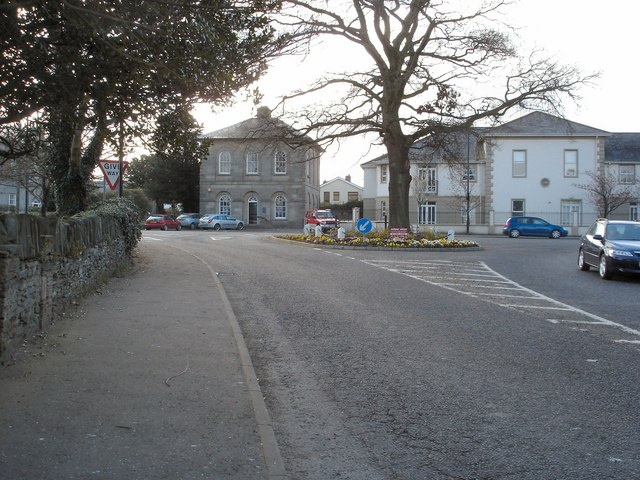

- Location within Northern Ireland
- Population: 3,571 (2021 Census)
  - Belfast: 58 mi (93 km)
- District: Derry and Strabane
- County: County Londonderry
- Country: Northern Ireland
- Sovereign state: United Kingdom
- Post town: LONDONDERRY
- Postcode district: BT47
- Dialling code: 028
- UK Parliament: East Londonderry

Eglinton is a village in County Londonderry, Northern Ireland. It lies 5.5 miles (8.9 km) east-north-east of Derry, to which it serves as a sleeper village, and 9.5 miles (15.3 km) west-south-west of Limavady. It resides within Derry and Strabane district. The City of Derry Airport, also known as Eglinton Aerodrome and formerly as Londonderry Eglinton Airport, lies a short distance from the village.

Eglinton still has an elegant church, former market house, trees around a green and four oaks which started life in Windsor Great Park. The River Muff flows through the village with the afforested Muff Glen being situated just south of the village. At an embankment of Lough Foyle, birdwatchers can find the feeding ground of many seabirds and waders on the mud flats at low tide.

== History ==
The village of Eglinton was originally known as (the) Muff, and alternatively as (the) Moigh or Mough. These come from Irish Magh / an Mhagh 'the plain' and were the names of the townland in which the village began. The village was founded in 1619 by the Grocers' Company of London. As part of the Plantation of Ulster, James I had granted a large area (15,900 acres) of Faughanvale parish to the Grocers in 1609. The Grocers did not farm it themselves but leased this area to Edward Rone of Essex in 1615 with the stipulation that he built a bawn and 12 houses by 1619. The yearly rent being £116-13s-4d. Rone died in 1618 but his brother-in-law Robert Harrington took over and by 1619 a castle and bawn, as well as eight houses were erected in the townland of Muff (now Eglinton) and by 1622 the stipulated building was completed

The castle (really a castellated house and bawn with 4 flanker towers) was besieged in 1641 during the English Civil War by the insurgents under Colonel McDonnell and defended by the garrison during the winter of that year. It was relieved the following summer by troops from Derry but it afterwards fell into the hands of the parliamentarians by whom it was dismantled. During the Siege of Derry, the castle was briefly occupied by troops of King James while they were foraging for supplies.

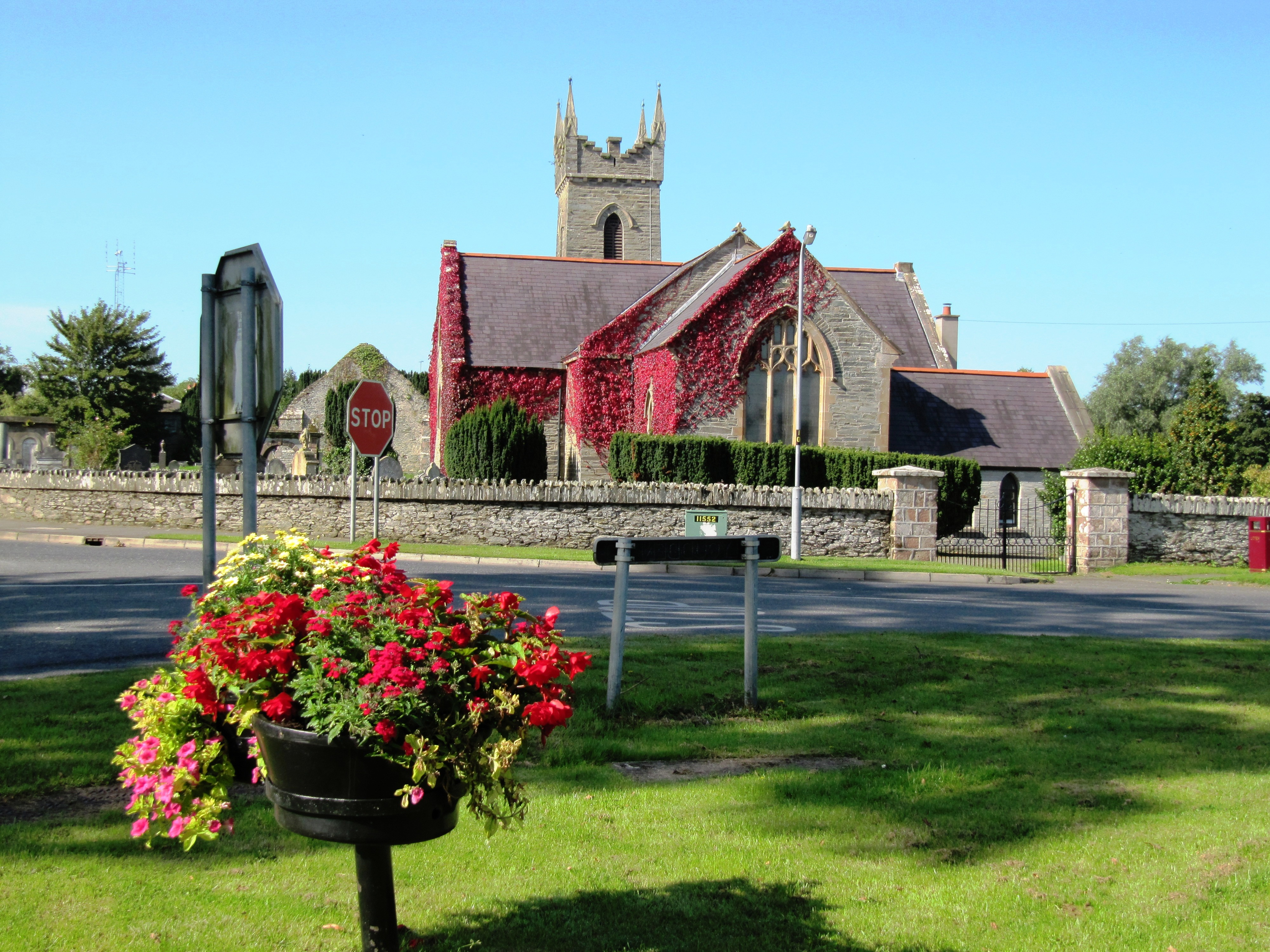
Eglinton Parish Church

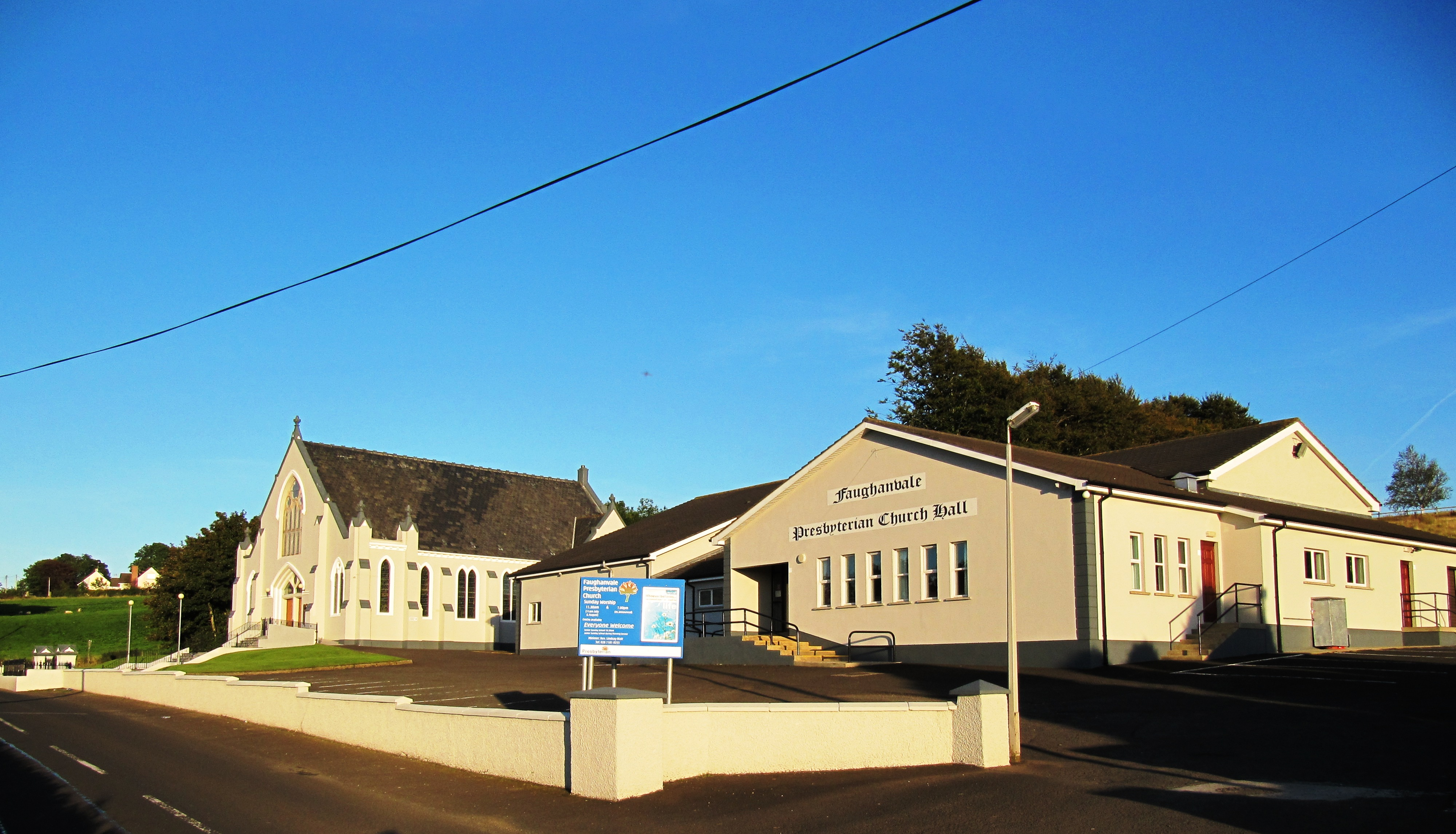
Faughanvale Presbyterian Church

The ruins were standing and occupied until 1823 when the present Rectory was built on the site. The only remains of the castle today are the cellars under the rectory.

The Church of Ireland was represented within the village by the Parish Church of Faughanvale which was built in 1626. It was later superseded by a new Parish Church constructed in 1821 with the ruins of the old church being extant within the adjacent graveyard.

The Presbyterian Church was represented in the village with the building of the first church in 1730. Prior to this, the congregation formed part of the Glendermott Congregation in the city of Derry. The original church was built in the townland of Tullanee just east of the village. The existing much larger church, Faughanvale Presbyterian Church, was built in 1894 with the help of donations from fellow citizens of the congregation who had some time earlier emigrated to the United States. Nothing remains of the original church which stood in what is now the Presbyterian Church graveyard immediately to the rear of the new church.

There were several other places called Muff at the time, especially one nearby in Donegal which created much confusion. The residents of the village resolved to afford of the opportunity to change the name. Therefore, on 19 August 1858, the village of Muff became Eglinton in honour of the Lord Lieutenant of Ireland, the 13th Earl of Eglinton who was visiting the nearby Templemoyle Agricultural School at the time. The school was opened in 1826 aimed at teaching new agricultural methods but eventually closed in 1865. The building remained disused for many years before being converted into a nursing home in the 1990s.

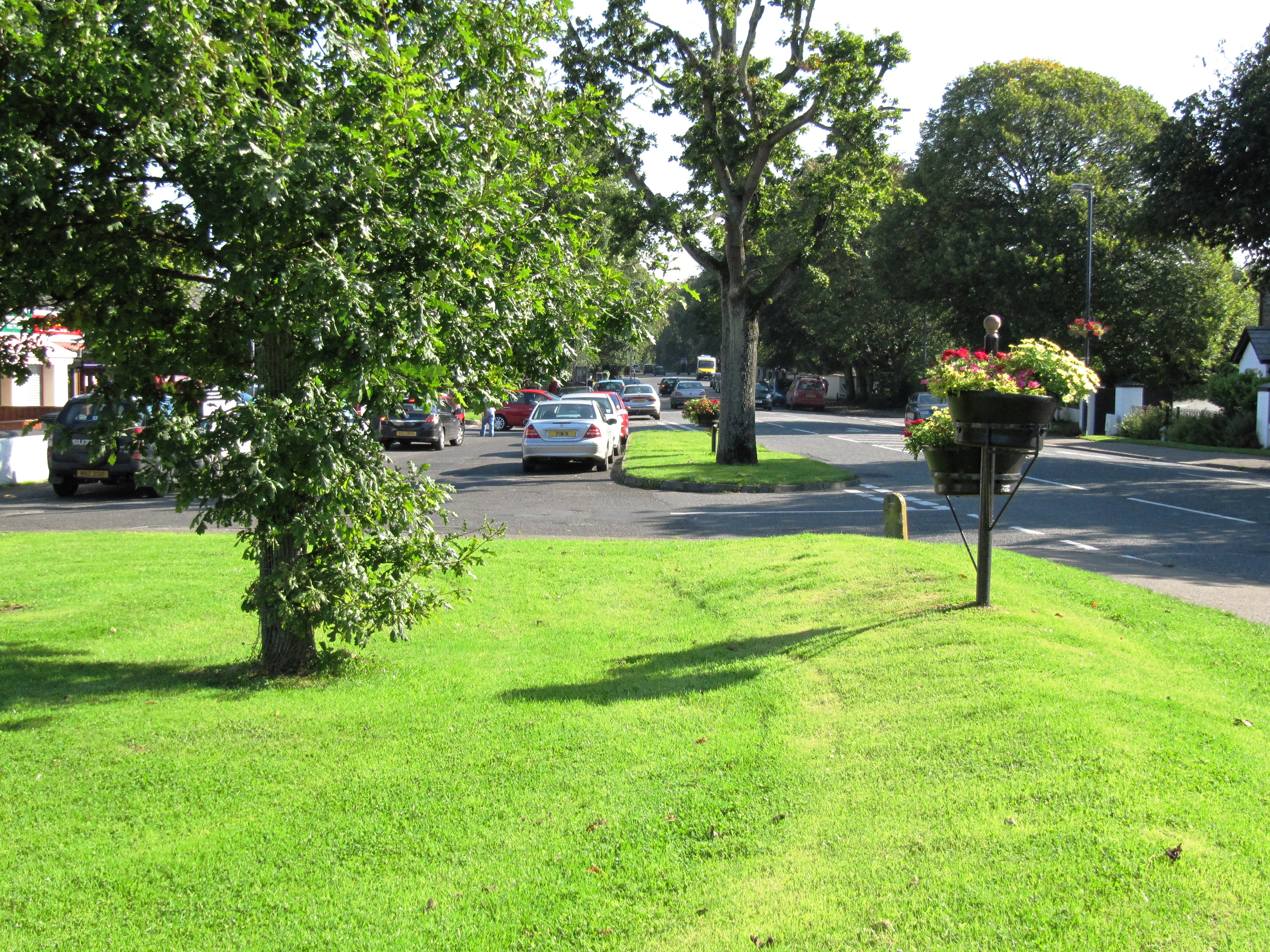
Main Street looking east

Tom Gallaher (1840–1927), the miller's son of Templemoyle, was the founder of the famous tobacco firm of Gallahers, now the Gallaher Group. His relatives lived in The Glen House in the centre of Eglinton village until the 1950s.

One of the oldest buildings, if not the oldest standing today, is Foyle Park House. Foyle Park was built in 1813 by David Babington who rented his land from the Worshipful Company of Grocers. The mansion was built when Babington started to make land improvements in the west of the village between 1805 and 1836 when he planted 172,000 trees, mainly to shelter the house. Babington used the house as a literary school for a while. When Babington's lease expired, the Grocers didn't renew the lease so the Literary School then closed its doors and Foyle Park then became the new Grocers' Hall. It was used as the Grocers' Hall until the 1870s when James Davidson, a customs and exports worker, bought the entire village from the Grocers' Company. This included the Foyle Park Estate. Davidson lived at Foyle Park and the Manor House. His son, James William Davidson then lived in Foyle Park after him. Davidson's grandson sold Foyle Park to H. Whiteside in 1920 and the house fell out of the Davidson family. The house was re-acquired by the family when Lt. Col. Kenneth Davidson bought the house back in the 1960s. The house remained with the family until it was finally sold off in 2011, after over 100 years of ownership.

Another of the oldest buildings today is the Erasmus Smith schoolhouse built in 1814 beside the old national school of 1886 both now private residences. The Grocers did not resume active management of the estate until 1823 when they rebuilt the village. Among the buildings erected by the company in 1823-5 were the Rectory, a Courthouse or Market house ( an unusually well designed building by Nicholson which included a dispensary (the wall plaques outside the former courthouse are the Grocers and David Babingtons coat of arms)), a Manor house for the Grocers agent and the Glen house. All of which are still to be seen today. They also built a row of cottages for local widows which was known until quite recently as Widow's Row (now renamed Cottage Row) and tradesmen's houses along Main Street. The millers house opposite the Happy Landing public house became the old R.I.C. barracks until the present police station (Closed in 2013, now retail space) was built. The Grocers sold the village in 1874 to James Davidson from Brechin, Scotland; his descendants still reside in the manor house to this day.

During the Second World War RAF Eglinton was home to many Royal Air Force and later to Royal Navy personnel. Many old buildings, either occupied by businesses or in a state of disrepair, evidence their presence around the outskirts of the village. The airfield was a major airfield for flights over the North Atlantic, their tasks included searching for U-boats and acting as air cover for convoys. Several aircraft crashed in the vicinity of the village and the nearby airfield with several pilots and aircrew being buried locally in the Parish Church and Presbyterian Church graveyards.

Shane Crossagh O'Mullan was born and lived in the townland of Tullanee in Eglinton (then Muff), where his father held land on the Grocers Estate. The same townland where the Faughavale Presbyterian Church resides. The Glenshane Pass is named after Shane. Shane's father, Donal, was evicted after a bailiff's son was allegedly insulted at their home. When Shane returned to the family home, he was accused of trespassing, and the family were forced to flee to the hills above Claudy to avoid prosecution. Many families had been driven there to make way for settlers. After a confrontation with two soldiers, Shane was a marked man. Together with his family and local schoolmaster, he was advised to hand himself to the magistrate for a more leniant sentence. Shane refused, and spent his next years as a Raparee, where he stole from wealthy settlers and landlords with the support of others who were dispossessed. Shane along with his two sons, Rory and Paudreen, where hanged in the Diamond in Derry in the 1720s.

A short-lived tornado of strength F1 tore the roof off a barn and flipped a car in Eglinton on 8 June 2011.

== Transport ==
- Eglinton railway station opened on 29 November 1852 and finally closed on 2 July 1973.
- City of Derry Airport, formerly RAF Eglinton, is located nearby.
- The A2 between City of Derry Airport and Maydown was recently upgraded to Dual Carriageway standard which road runs between the village and the city of Derry.
- Derry city bus stops within Eglinton mainstreet.
- The Belfast–Derry line on Northern Ireland Railways has trains running through but not stopping, as the station is not yet reopened.

== Demography ==
National Identity of Eglinton residents (2021)
Nationality	Per cent
Irish	41.3%
Northern Irish	34.6%
British	33.9%

=== 2021 Census ===
On Census day (21 March 2021) there were 3,571 people living in Eglinton. Of these:

- 57.69% were from a Catholic background and 37.19% were from a Protestant or other Christian background.

=== 2011 Census ===
On Census day (27 March 2011) there were 3,679 people (in 1,315 households) living in Eglinton an increase of 16% on the 2001 Census population of 3,165. Of these:

- 25.5% were aged under 16 and 9.6% were aged 65 and over
- 49.8% of the population were male and 50.2% were female
- 53.3% were from a Catholic background and 42.7% were from a Protestant or other Christian background
- 4.9% of people aged 16–74 were unemployed

== Sports ==
Woodvale Road, home of the Eglinton Cricket Club, is located here.

== Notable people ==
- Jason Smyth, Paralympic gold medalist
- Shane Crossagh O'Mullan, Community Outlaw / Raparee

== See also ==
- List of villages in Northern Ireland
- List of localities in Northern Ireland by population

== Sources ==
- Geographia
- Culture Northern Ireland
