= John Hurley =

John Hurley may refer to:

- John Hurley (New South Wales politician, born 1796) (1796–1882), member for Narellan, 1859–1880
- John Hurley (New South Wales politician, born 1844) (1844–1911), member for Central Cumberland and Hartley (also member of Queensland Assembly 1883–1884)
- John Hurley (New South Wales politician, born 1894) (1894–1985), member for Albury 1946–1947
- John Hurley (1941–1986), American songwriter
- John Hurley (footballer) (1884–1972), Australian rules footballer
- John E. Hurley (1906–1992), American politician in Massachusetts
- Colonel John Hurley, Irish Jacobite
- Sir John Hurley, Irish Jacobite
- John Hurley (died 2021), victim of the Olde Town Square shooting in Arvada, Colorado

== See also ==
- John Hurly (1878–1949), justice of the Montana Supreme Court
