= William Hurley =

William Hurley may refer to:

- William Hurley (Australian politician) (1848–1924), New South Wales politician
- William Hurley (carpenter), English carpenter (known works 1319–1354)
- William A. Hurley (died 1952), American Thoroughbred horse trainer
- William E. Hurley (1875–?), American politician in Massachusetts
- Dick Hurley (William H. Hurley, 1847–?), American baseball player
- Billy Hurley III (born 1982), American golfer
- whurley (William Hurley, born 1971), co-founder of Chaotic Moon Studios

== See also ==
- Sir William Hurly, 3rd Baronet, MP, of the Hurly baronets
- Billy Hurley (disambiguation)
