= Billy Hurley =

Billy Hurley may refer to:

- Billy Hurley III (born 1982), American golfer
- Billy Hurley (footballer) (born 1959), English former footballer

== See also ==
- William Hurley (disambiguation)
