= Donogh Dáll Ó Derrig =

Donogh Dáll Ó Derrig, a.k.a. Blind Donogh O'Derrick, was an Irish rapparee executed in December 1656.

Ó Derrig was active in County Kildare in the early 1650s, in the aftermath of the Irish Confederate Wars.

A court-martial held in Kilkenny on 23 September 1653 found Murtagh Cullen and his wife guilty of sheltering Ó Derrig. Sentenced to death, they were allowed to draw lots to decide who would die. When Mrs. Cullen drew the death lot, the sentence was deferred due to her pregnancy.

In July 1654, he led his band of outlaws and killed an Irishman working as a constable for the English in Timolin, County Kildare.

In March 1655, he captured and subsequently hanged eight surveyors of Sir William Petty as accessories to a gigantic scheme of ruthless robbery. A price of £30 was put on his head and that of his lieutenant, Dermot Ryan. In the autumn, Ó Derrig's wife was one of thirty-seven people rounded up and transported via a frigate of Wexford to Barbados, arriving in May 1656. By then, Ó Derrig had been captured at a house in Timolin, summarily tried and executed. Dermot Ryan escaped and survived for another two years.
