= Shane Crossagh O'Mullan =

John Mullan, more commonly known as Shane Crossagh O'Mullan, was an Irish rapparee/outlaw, who was executed in the 1720s at the Diamond, in Derry city.

== Background ==
Shane Crossagh and his family, lived in Tullanee, Faughanvale, in the barony of Keenaght, County Londonderry. More specifically Tullanee is a small townland beside Eglinton, County Londonderry, and Tullanee is where the modern-day Faughanvale Presbyterian Church resides. Indeed, the founding of the Church occurs a few years after Shane and his sons hanging. Shanes's father, Donal, and the rest of the family were evicted when a bailiff's son was insulted in Donal's house. When Shane was later caught cutting grass at the property, the family in an attempt to escape punishment relocated to Lingwood in the mountains above Claudy. Here lived many people whose fathers had been dispossessed to make way for settlers from Great Britain.

With Lingwood as his base, Shane would form a gang made up of people who were either greedy for plunder or for vengeance, becoming rapparees carrying out attacks and raids throughout the Sperrins mountain range. Shane was eventually caught and hanged with his sons in the Diamond in Derry in the 1720s, being possibly interred between 1725 and 1735 in the cemetery of Banagher. The Glenshane Pass, through which the main road between Derry and Belfast runs, is named after him.

== Crossagh ==
His nickname, Crossagh, came from the Irish word "Crosach" meaning "pock-marked". It was an ancestral family name, and as such used by his father, probably derived from an ancestor who was scarred as a result of the pox. Possibly it was originally used to distinguish them from other Ó Maoláin's.
