= Sir John Hurley =

Irish Jacobite

Sir John Hurley, Irish Jacobite, fl. 1714.

== Biography ==
Sir John Hurley was a grandson of Sir Maurice Hurley of Knocklong, eldest son of Sir Thomas and Joanna. His father, Sir William, was an M.P. for Kilmallock in 1689 and married Mary Blount.

Of him, a family website states:

"Sir John Hurley, who, in 1714, was arrested in Dublin, on a charge of having raised a body of troops for the Pretender. He made his escape from prison, but of his subsequent career we know nothing. Had a son John. the descendants of this John lived at Drumacoo, near Kinvara, {County Galway} in 1840."

He appears to be the John Hurley who was a recruiter for the Irish Brigades in the early 18th century (p.204) but is confused in the sources with his cousin, Colonel John Hurley.

He was a cousin of Luis Roberto de Lacy (1772–1817), brigadier general of the Spanish Army who fought for Spain in the Peninsular War.

== Family tree ==
   Teige Ó hUirthile, lord of Knocklong, County Limerick and Chief of the Name 
   |
   |____________________________________
   |                                 | 
   |                                 |
   Dermod                            Tomás Ó hUirthile, fl. 1585.
  =?                                =?   
   |                                 |
   |                                 |_______________
   Juliana                           |             |
  =Edmond Óge de Courcy              |             |
   |                                 Randal        Maurice Ó hUirthile of Knocklong, fl. 1601-34.
   |                                              =Racia Thornton (dsp)  =Gráinne Ní hÓgáin
   John, 18th Baron Kingsale                                          |
                                                                          |
                                                                          Sir Thomas O'Hurley
                                                                         =Joanna Brown of Mount Brown, Limerick
                                                                          |
   _______________________________________________________________________|____________________________________
   |                                    |                         |                          |                |
   |                                    |                         |                          |                | 
   Sir Maurice, died c. 1683.           Catherine                 Anne                       Grace            Elinora
  =?                                    =Peirce, Lord Dunboyne    =Daniel Ó Maoilriain   =Walter Bourke   =David Barry
   |                             
   |                             
   Sir William, fl. 1689.      
  =Mary Blount 
   |                             
   |             
   Colonel Sir John Hurley, fl. 1694.
   |
   |
   Charles Hurley
   |
   |
   Donogh Hurley
   = Anne Blennerhass
   |
   |
   John Hurley
   = Mary Crowly
   |
   |
   Timothy Hurley
   = Mary Stanley 
   |
   |
   Daniel Hurley
   = Julia Driscoll

== See also ==
- Diarmaid Ó hUrthuile, Archbishop of Cashel, c. 1530 – 21 June 1584.
- Colonel John Hurley, raparee, fl. 1694.
