= Captain Gallagher =

Irish highwayman

- Born: 1800; Bonniconlon, County Mayo, Ireland
- Died: 1818 (aged 17–18); Castlebar, County Mayo, Ireland
- Occupations: highwayman, rapparee
- Known for: He was one of the Irish Rapparees (Guerrillas) of Ireland

Captain Gallagher (died 1818) was an Irish highwayman who, as one of the later Irish Rapparees (guerrillas), led a bandit group in the hills of the Irish countryside, armed with a blunderbuss, during the late 18th and early 19th century.

== Life ==
Born in Bonniconlon, County Mayo, he lived with his aunt in Derryronane, Swinford for much of his early life and was raised near the woods of Barnalyra. As he reached early adulthood, he and group of others began raiding mail coaches as well as wealthy landowners and travelers throughout eastern Mayo and parts of southern County Sligo and western County Roscommon.

His attacks on landowners were especially widely known and, in one reported incident, Gallagher and his men raided the home of an extremely unpopular landlord in Killasser and forced him to eat half a dozen eviction notices he had recently drawn up for nearly half a dozen tenant farmers before escaping with silver and other valuables.

Although successfully evading British patrols for some time, he was finally apprehended by authorities in the parish of Coolcarney (or possibly Attymass) near the foothills of the Ox Mountains while recovering from an illness at a friend's home during Christmas. He had been informed on by a neighbour, whom Gallagher had formerly helped, and who sent a message of Gallagher's whereabouts to the British commanding officer at Foxford, who immediately sent for reinforcements from Ballina, Castlebar and Swinford. A force of 200 redcoats was sent after Gallagher and, upon arrival, proceeded to surround the home where the highwayman was staying. Gallagher, by then in poor health and not wishing to endanger his host nor his family, surrendered to the British.

Taken back to Foxford, Gallagher was hastily tried and convicted, then taken to Castlebar, where he was executed. Shortly before his execution, he had claimed to the British commanding officer that his treasure had been hidden under a rock in the woods of Barnalyra. After Gallagher's execution, the officer quickly led several cavalrymen to Barnalyra and discovered that there were thousands of rocks in the wood; after a long search of all the rocks within the area they reportedly only recovered a jewel-hilted sword. It has been speculated that Gallagher may have been hoping to be asked to lead the soldiers to the site in the hopes his men would be able to rescue him from their hideout near the Derryronane-Curryane border; the treasure, if it consisted of more than the sword, was never recovered.

== See also ==
Captain Rock
