= Glenshane Pass =

Mountain pass in Northern Ireland

Coordinates: 54.88006°N 6.79084°W

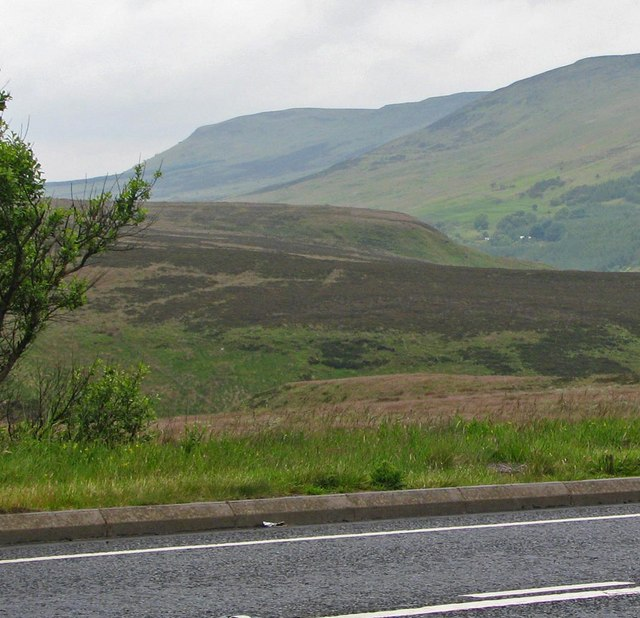
The Sperrin mountains from the Glenshane Pass road

The Glenshane Pass (from Irish Gleann Seáin 'Shane's valley') is a major mountain pass cutting through the Sperrin Mountains in County Londonderry, Northern Ireland. It is in the townland of Glenshane Pass on the main Derry to Belfast route, the A6.

A large wildfire broke out in Glenshane Pass in late June 2018, burning more than 600 acres of dry gorse in the pass by 27 June.

== Features ==
It is a Special Area of Conservation. Carn/Glenshane Pass is a large area of intact blanket bog, characterised by undulating topography and including a large, well-developed hummock and pool system within a thick mantle of blanket peat. It is also classed as an Area of Special Scientific Interest. The Ponderosa is the second highest public house on the island of Ireland, situated 288 metres (945 feet) above sea level.

== History ==
The Glenshane Pass derives its name from the townland of Glenshane. It is named after Shane Crossagh O'Mullan a notorious rapparee, or highwayman, who roamed the highways of County Londonderry and County Tyrone in the late seventeenth and early eighteenth century.

=== The Troubles ===
- On 24 June 1972, three British Army soldiers were killed by a landmine explosion on the Glenshane Pass. Their Land Rover was destroyed by two IEDs consisting of 120 lbs of explosive packed in milk churns.
- On 17 March 1978, a British Army soldier was shot dead in a gun battle with IRA gunmen near the Glenshane Pass. Some reports said he was involved in a covert observation post when he spotted two suspected gunmen. He stood up to challenge the men and was fatally wounded, but he shot back wounding one man.
