= Bosco Chiesanuova =

- Comune
- Comune di Bosco Chiesanuova
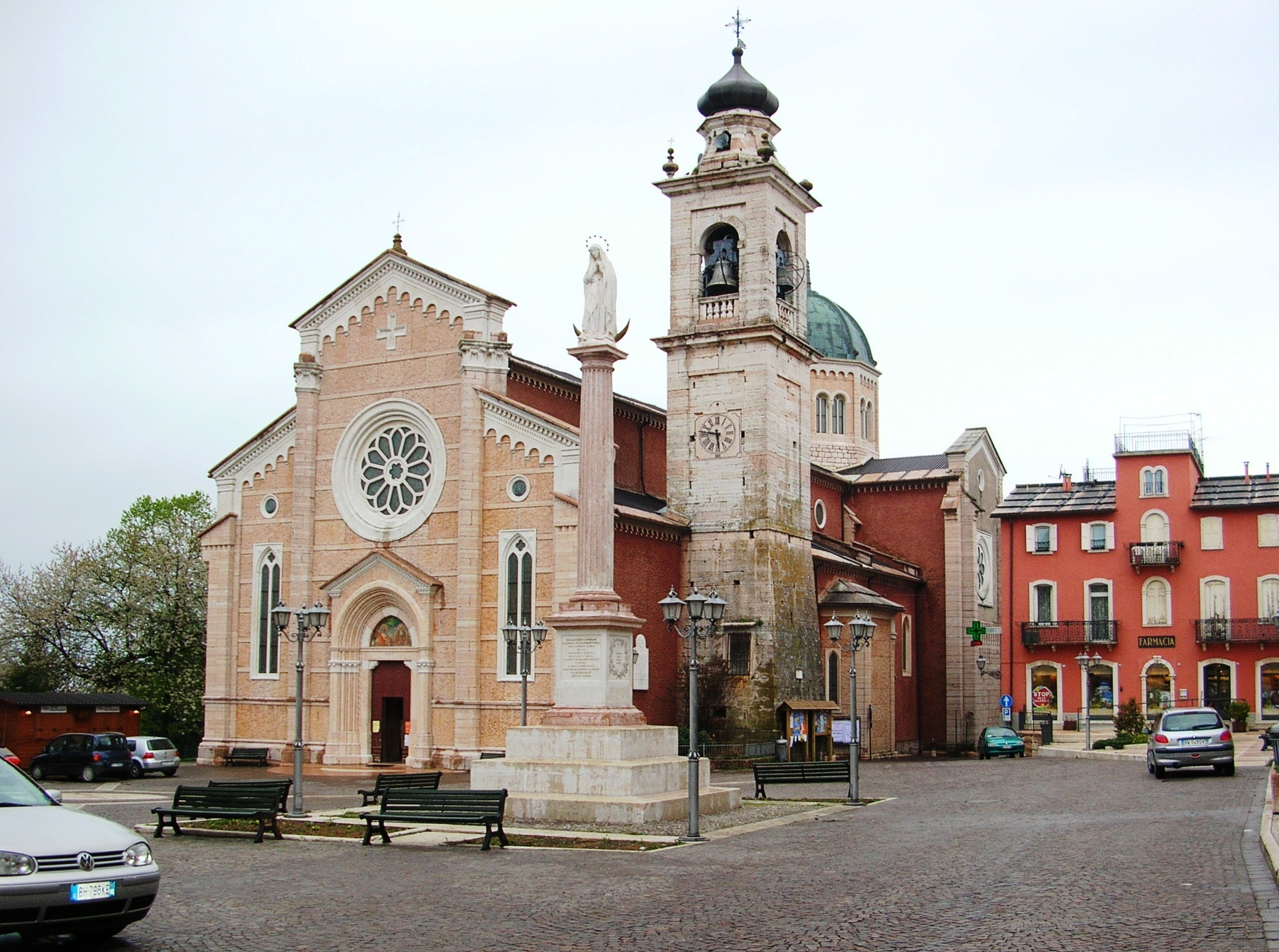

- Location within Italy Location within Veneto
- Coordinates: 45°37′N 11°2′E
- Country: Italy
- Region: Veneto
- Province: Verona (VR)
- Frazioni: Bosco Chiesanuova, Corbiolo, Lughezzano-Arzerè e Valdiporro

Government
  - Mayor: Claudio Melotti

Area
  - Total: 64.6 km^{2} (24.9 sq mi)
- Elevation: 1,106 m (3,629 ft)

Population (30 November 2024)
  - Total: 3,618
  - Density: 56.0/km^{2} (145/sq mi)
- Demonym: Boscochiesanuovesi
- Time zone: UTC+1 (CET)
  - Summer (DST): UTC+2 (CEST)
- Postal code: 37021, 37020 frazioni
- Dialing code: 045
- Website: Official website

Bosco Chiesanuova (Italian pronunciation: [ˈbɔsko ˌkjɛzaˈnwɔːva]; Cimbrian: Nuagankirchen; German: Neuenkirchen; Venetian: Cesanòa) is a comune (municipality) in the Province of Verona in the Italian region Veneto, located about 100 kilometres (62 mi) west of Venice and about 20 kilometres (12 mi) north of Verona. It is part of the Thirteen Communities, a group of villages which historically speak the Cimbrian language.

Bosco Chiesanuova borders the following municipalities: Ala, Cerro Veronese, Erbezzo, Grezzana, Roverè Veronese, and Selva di Progno.

Massimo Moratti was born here.
