= Black Francis McHugh =

Black Francis McHugh, also known as "Proinsías Dubh", was a notorious highwayman, or Rapparee, who 'robbed the rich to give to the poor' at the end of the 18th century. His origins lay in Meencloghore (County Tyrone).

== Black Francis and his gang ==
Black Francis and his gang were essentially gentlemen Jacobites who did not go to the Continent after the Williamite War but rather took to the hills and were known as Rapparees, robbing the rich and giving to the poor.

The gang included Patrick "Supple Dick" Corrigan, Tom Acheson, Tarlach Mhuiris (Richard Monkham), James Mc Quaid (McCabe?), Brian Mc Alynn and Alex Wright. They operated from their base in the Tievemore Mountains (Scraghy Hills) around 1770–1780.

It is almost certain that Proinsías Dubh's last name was McHugh, however some oral historians call him Corrigan. This may refer to another member of the gang, Supple Corrigan.

== Stories ==
There are many tales in the oral folklore about this Rapparee.

=== Daring Deeds ===
In one tale, the outlaw relieved the regular army (Red Coats) of 70,000 gold sovereigns. This booty was disposed of by hiding it in a foal's skin (which he had come across on the road from Killeter to Killen over Leitrim Hill) and burying it. It is thought that the treasure is still there at a place which is "in line with the 3 spires during the last rays of the setting sun on the 22nd of June".

In another brush with the Red Coats, Proinsias Dubh took cover in a house in Segronan. In those days houses only had a front door but in this case Proinsias Dubh slipped out a back door before the soldiers had surrounded it.

=== The Raid of Lisgoole Abbey ===
In way of reparation for the Lord Deputy of Ireland's seizure of Lisgoole Abbey and as a measure to reimburse their fellow countrymen for punishing burdens of debt, Black Francis's gang raided the abbey.

It is unclear who owned Lisgoole Abbey at the time. Sources say it was a Major Armstrong, who informed the authorities, the so-called militiamen, of the raid. Other sources state that the abbey at this time belonged to Sir Joseph Davies, an English lawyer.

After the raid, the Irish Militia pursued Black Francis to the Sillees River from Enniskillen. When it looked as though the militiamen would successfully cut off the highwayman's escape route, he leaped the Sillees River in a single bound with his horse, a jump of 20 feet. The Captain of the militia remarked ”Corrigan, that's a good jump", and the Highwayman retorted "the Divil thank ye, I had a long race for it".

Both parties continued their chase until Black Francis came to a hill called Druminiskill and there he threw the money he had looted in a bog hole, declaring that "some man or woman that came by after him would be rich".

Other accounts of this story say that it was actually Black Francis's companion Supple Corrigan that leaped the Sillees. After his jump, it is said that Supple made his escape to the United States.

=== The Last Stand of Proinsias Dubh ===
When he was captured, Black Francis was reputed to have said that he had "run too fast to run long".

The trial of Proinsías Dubh took place at the prison in Enniskillen where the Technical School is now situated. It was thought that Supple Corrigan escaped capture by disguising himself as a woman and hiding in the crowd of onlookers at the public trial.

During the trial of Black Francis, the daughter of General Armstrong asked for clemency due to Black Francis's gentlemanly behaviour to her during the Abbey raid, but this was rejected by the jury and he was sentenced to be hanged.

Proinsías Dubh's final oratory from the gallows was quite lengthy and when told to speed it up, he countered that although the hangman's day was very long, his day would be without a doubt quite short. His body was transported by boat through Lough Erne to the Waterfoot near Pettigo from whence it was borne through the village to Carn Graveyard, on the road to Lough Derg. There lies the final resting place of the rapparee Proinsías Dubh in 1782, although other sources state it was May 1780.

== Songs and Poems ==
There is a poem or song devoted to this highwayman

The Ballad of Proinsias Dubh

My name it is bold Frank Mc Hugh
As game a cock as ever crew.
In Meencloghore I was bred and born,
Free from all disgrace and scorn.
Fal-lal-tee-dee.

It was bad company I was in,
When first this robbery did begin.
The very night I went away,
My wife she cried to this sad day.
Fal-lal-tee-dee.

First we took Donegal and Derry,
Where we drank till we were merry.
When trade in this country it fell low
We then took Connaught and Mayo
Fal-lal-tee-dee.

As I and my comrades marched along
We came to one Mr Armstrong,
But also to our sad fate
We arrived at his house to late.
Fal-lal-tee-dee.

Here is five pounds I will give to you
If you tell me where is Frank Mc Hugh.
Your five pounds will do me no harm ,
Frank Mc Hugh lies in my barn.
Fal-lal-tee-dee.

Then the guards did give me a close pursue;
I gave them all enough to do.
Going up by a place called Irvinestown
Those valiant heros ran me down.
Fal-lal-tee-dee.

On the gallows I am condemned to die
And hope that God will pardon me,
And hope that God will pardon me,
I die all on the gallows tree.
Fal-lal-tee-dee.

Here's to my wife, my children and friends,
An obligation I leave on them.
An obligation I leave on them,
For to never upcast my dismal end
Fal-lal-tee-dee

Another ballad is

Eva Brown's Love Story

Come all ye love-lorn damsels who dwell around the town
Till I tell ye the story of lovely Eva Brown
Who loved a bold young highwayman whose name was Francis Dubh
Who robbed the rich and fed the poor and to his friends was true
