= Lisgoole Abbey =

Abbey, now house, in County Fermanagh, Northern Ireland

Coordinates: 54.324757°N 7.630216°W

Lisgoole Abbey (Irish: Lios Gabhail) is a large Georgian house with a battlement tower at one end, with substantial grounds, near Enniskillen, County Fermanagh. It is now privately owned but was once a monastic site, built around the 12th century. The abbey was burned in 1360 but was soon restored. It escaped the worst excesses of religious persecution, and was handed over to the Franciscan order in 1583. Irish historian and scholar Mícheál Ó Cléirigh stopped there in 1631 and compiled the Lebor Gabála Érenn, the book of invasions, a narrative in Gaelic, together with O'Mulcrony, Cucoigry O'Glery, O Duigenan and Gilla Patrick O' Lennon. It has subsequently had many uses, including an orphanage in the 19th century, and a base for American army divisions during the Second World War.

== Foundation ==
Lisgoole Abbey, or the Abbey Church of Saint Peter, Saint Paul and Saint Mary, was formerly located on the southern banks of upper Lough Erne, County Fermanagh, Northern Ireland. The site occupied the old Irish monastery of St Aid but was taken over by the Canons Regular of St. Augustine in 1106 or 1145 and was dedicated by Mc'Noellus Mackenlef, King of Ulaid. The sight has also been referred to as Lesa Gabail/Lesa Gabhail (1275), Lisngabail (deanery de Loghermy)(1306), Lesa gabhail/lios gabhail (1329), Leasa Gabhail/lesa gabail (1348), Lisgabhail (1395) and Lis Gabhail (1425).

== History ==
The abbey was burned in 1360 together with those in Devenish, Roscommon, Sligo, Fenagh and Drumlias but was soon restored. During the reign of King Richard of England there is reference to the wife of Abbot of Lisgooles Einri Mac Caba and their daughter Aine. Escaping the worst excesses of religious persecution, the abbey remained in use until its community eventually dwindled, so much so that an agreement was drawn up by the then abbot Cahill McBrien McCuchonnaght Maguire in 1583 to hand over the abbey to the Franciscan order. Even though reconstruction of a new abbey was taking place the monks were forced to leave in 1598.

=== Plantation era ===
During King James's inquisition into the designation of the lands of Fermanagh (September 1609), the lands of Lisgoole Abbey were given to Sir Henry Brunckar (12 November 1606). The allocation covered the abbey and the area of the late Abbey of Cannons in Lisgoole, which in turn included the old church and yard. The specific area was designated as 6 "quarters" of land containing 24 parcels known as tithes, each tate estimated to contain 30 acres (120,000 m^{2}) in "country measure". Associated with these lands were other traditional payments given to Ballinsaggart and other associated islands, together with the ownership of the late Abbey of St Francis, which is situated near Lisgoole Abbey.

Lisgoole was recommended as the site of a new colonial-plantation settlement (later to be Enniskillen) by the Lord Deputy, Chichester. There were two sites under consideration for the proposed settlement, the first being Ballyshanon (now Ballyshannon) and the other at "Lysgoule which lies about the midst of the county". Lord Chichester expressed the view that he wanted to construct the "beginning of a town where he would build both sides of the river, whereby the bridge could be defended and the passage secured". Chichester was so taken by the location of Lisgoole he immediately ordered houses to be constructed to billet soldiers stationed at Devenish, together with a gaol and house of sessions, and a weekly market.

The owners of Lisgoole ignored this offer from the Lord Deputy. The location eventually chosen by the commissioners for a town was Enniskillen. In 1608 Chichester recommended this position in his notes of remembrances but seems to have forgotten Lisgoole, saying "Inishkellin is the fittest place for a shire town and shall be made a corporation". The free school originally intended to be built at Lisgoole was eventually built at Portora. Eventually, the monks returned in 1616.

=== Gathering of the Four Masters ===
Irish historian and scholar Brother Mícheál Ó Cléirigh stopped there in 1631 and compiled the Lebor Gabála Érenn, translated in English, the book of invasions, a narrative in Gaelic together with O'Mulcrony, Cucoigry O'Glery, O Duigenan and Gilla Patrick O' Lennon. (O Luinín) This was the first documented assembly of the Four Masters who later went on to document the Annals of the Kingdom of Ireland (Annals of the Four Masters). It is written that the task, under the patronage of Brian Roe Maguire, commenced on 22 October 1631 and was finished by 22 December the same year.

Later in 1644, Connor, Lord Maguire, was hanged for treason at Tyburn, London, His last will and testament was kept in a strong box, in the custody of the friars which amongst other things bequeathed £20 to the abbey for prayers for his soul. In 1671, it is reported that the friar of Lisgoole (Paul O Feararan) met Oliver Plunkett at the abbey. In his report at this time (25 September 1671) the Primate states that there were five friars at Lisgoole, two of whom were good preachers, (Frs Feararan and Mcmulkin).

=== 17th–18th century ===
In 1698 the abbey was sold to Mr. Thomas Smith by Charles Wallis and his wife, who succeeded the Earl of Huntingdon. Not much is noted about Lisgoole until 1739 when a chalice was presented by Sir Bryan Maguire. The land which used to belong to the abbey was leased in 1724 to John Armstrong, then James Armstrong (1750), James Armstrong (1758), then James, Thomas, and Jane Armstrong (1800).

There was a notable raid on the abbey in 1780 by Black Francis McHugh and his gang (Pronsias Dhu). The monks continued worshipping until well into the 18th century, but their work in the local parishes was eventually responsible for their depletion. The last recorded friar from the area was Fr. Stephen Keenan, who died in Enniskillen in 1811.

=== 19th–20th century ===
In 1819, John Armstrong, a lieutenant in the Fermanagh Regiment of Militia, sold the abbey to Michael Jones of Cherrymount, Donegal (also stated to be of Camlin), for £12,300.

In 1892, his wife, Mrs. Isabella Diana Jones, bequeathed the abbey to local charities including the Fermanagh Protestant Orphan Society. It was later purchased by Mr. Robert Johnston of Stuttgart and New York, who died in 1913. It then passed to his nephew Robert William Johnston. At this time only a remnant of the abbey remaining was incorporated into the house.

During the Second World War, American army divisions used this area as a base. These units included the 109th Medical Battalion (34th Infantry Division) in 1942 and the 8th Medical Battalion (minus Companies A and B) (8th Infantry Division) from 16 December 1943 to 1944.

== Custodians ==
- Augustin – died 1329
- Adam Ó Cianain, cannon and historian – 1373
- Donal Lennon, prior – 1380
- Hugh O Flanagan, prior – 1419
- Simon Mac Arachain, a canon and granger of lisgoole – 1431
- Luke Lennon, prior – 1434
- Eoin Lennon, prior – 1446
- Redmond Roe Maguire, prior – 1522
- William McCormick, prior – 1583
