= Dónal Ó Maoláine =

Dónal Ó Maoláine, a.k.a. Eamon Mhagaine, Irish poet and rapparee, fl. 18th century.

Ó Maoláine, a native of County Mayo, is described by O'Rourke as a "shadowy figure" who figures in a chanson d'aventure where he is given a letter by the father of a woman who offers to marry him. He refuses, "saying he is bethrothed to another man's daughter, and leaves her lamenting she ever knew him." Subsequent verses reveal that he met her a year ago and that she bore his child. In one version, he is "taken to be a rapparee or an outlaw; the theory is supported by a verse (collected in Mayo) which mention's the Queen's pardon" (perhaps indicating the reign of Queen Anne, 1702–14).

A concluding verse, when translated, is as follows:

Go and marry her then, 'tis little I care about it
Ireland is not empty and I'll get another man
I know a man who wouldn't ask a dowry of a penny with me
but would take me in my smock, although I'm no pauper.
