= Rapparee =

Guerillas and bandits in 1600s Ireland

Rapparees or raparees (from the Irish ropairí, plural of ropaire, whose primary meaning is 'thruster, stabber', and by extension a wielder of the half-pike or pike), were Irish guerrilla fighters who operated on the Royalist side during the Cromwellian conquest of Ireland (1649–1653) and the Jacobite side during the 1690s Williamite war in Ireland. Subsequently, the name was also given to bandits and highwaymen in Ireland – many former guerrilla fighters having turned to armed robbery, cattle raiding, and selling protection against theft to provide for themselves, their families, and their clansmen after the war ended. They were in many cases outlawed members of the Gaelic nobility of Ireland and still held to the code of conduct demanded of the traditional chiefs of the Irish clans.

They share many similarities with other dispossessed gentlemen-turned outlaws like Scotland's William Wallace, Robert the Bruce and the Black Douglas, England's real Hereward the Wake and legendary Robin Hood or the hajduks of Eastern Europe.

== Wood kerne and Tories ==
There was a long tradition of guerrilla warfare in Ireland before the 1690s. Irish irregulars in the 16th century were known as ceithearnaigh choille, wood-kerne, a reference to native Irish foot-soldiers called ceithearnaigh, or "kerne".

In the Irish Confederate Wars of the 1640s and 50s, irregular fighters on the Irish Confederate side were known as tories, from the Irish word tóraidhe (modern tóraí) meaning 'pursuer'.

From 1650 to 1653, during the Cromwellian conquest of Ireland, the tories caused the Parliamentarian forces led by Cromwell a great deal of trouble, attacking vulnerable garrisons, tax-collectors and supply columns and then melting away when faced with detachments of Parliamentarian troops. Henry Ireton first led a sweep of County Wicklow and the south midlands in September–October 1650 to try to clear it of tory guerrillas.

During the 1650–51 winter, the Parliamentarian commander John Hewson led punitive columns into the midlands and the Wicklow mountains to try and root out the guerilla bands. Although they captured a number of small castles and killed several hundred guerrillas, they were not able to stop the guerilla attacks. In Wicklow especially, Hewson destroyed all stocks of food he found in order to starve the guerrillas into submission.

The guerrillas were eventually defeated in part by ordering all civilians from areas where they operated to leave their habitations, and then designating these regions (in areas which included Wicklow and much of the south of Ireland) as what would now be termed free-fire zones, where anyone found still residing in them would then be allowed to be "taken slain and destroyed as enemies and their cattle and goods shall be taken or spoiled as the goods of enemies" by Parliamentarian soldiers. Hewson also ordered the expulsion of Roman Catholic townsmen from Dublin, for fear they were aiding the guerillas in the countryside. Other counterinsurgency tactics included selling those captured as indentured servants and finally publishing surrender terms allowing guerillas to leave the country to enter military service in France and Spain. The last organised bands of tories surrendered in 1653 when many of them left Ireland to serve in foreign armies.

After the war, many tories continued their activities, "a spasmodic and disconnected opposition to the new regime", in part as Catholic partisans, in part as ordinary criminals who "brought misery to friend and foe alike". The ranks of tories remained filled throughout the post-war period by displaced Irish Catholics whose land and property were confiscated in the Cromwellian Settlement.

Their situation is reflected in this stanza from a contemporary song from Munster, "Éamonn an Chnoic":

Is fada mise amuigh faoi shneachta agus faoi shioc
is gan dánacht agam ar éinneach,
mo sheisreach gan scur, mo bhranar gan cur,
is gan iad agam ar aon chor.
Níl caraid agam, is danaid liom san,
a ghlacfadh mé moch nó déanach,
is go gcaithfidh mé dul thar farraige soir
ós ann nach bhfuil mo ghaolta.

Translation:

Long have I been out in snow and frost,
having no one that I know,
my plough-team still unyoked, the fallow unploughed,
and with those things lost to me;
I regret not having friends
who would take me in at morning or night,
and that I must go eastwards over the sea,
for there I have no relations.

== Williamite War ==
In the 1690s, during the Glorious Revolution, the label "tory" was insultingly given to the English supporters of James II, to associate them with the Irish rebels and bandits of a generation earlier. In Ireland, Irish Catholics supported James – becoming known as Jacobites. Under Richard Talbot, 1st Earl of Tyrconnell, each locality had to raise a regiment to support the Jacobite cause. Most did so, but James and his French backers did not have the resources to arm and pay them all, so many of them were disbanded. It was from these bands that most of the Rapparees were organised. They armed themselves with whatever they could find or take from Protestant civilians, including muskets, long knives (sceana or "skiens") and half-pikes. The rapparees got their name from this last weapon – a pike about 6 feet (2 m) long, cut down from the standard military pike which was up to 16 feet (5 m) long.

Throughout the campaign, the rapparees caused major logistical problems to the Williamite army, raiding their rear areas and killing their soldiers and supporters. Many rapparee bands developed a bad reputation among the general civilian population, including among Catholics, for robbing indiscriminately. George Warter Story, a chaplain with a Williamite regiment, relates that the rapparees hid their weapons in bogs when Williamite troops were in the area and melted into the civilian population, only to re-arm and reappear when the troops were gone. The rapparees were a considerable help to the Jacobite war effort, tying down thousands of Williamite troops who had to protect supply depots and columns. The famous rapparees "Galloping Hogan" and Éamonn an Chnoic are said to have guided Sir Patrick Sarsfield's cavalry raid that destroyed the Williamite siege train at the siege of Limerick in 1690.

== Fiction ==
Rapparees have been mentioned in fiction, for example in Thomas Flanagan's Year of the French: "Joshua's son Jonathan, who in 1690 had raised his company to serve King William at the Boyne and Aughrim and Limerick, rode home to Mount Pleasant and defended it for five years against the sporadic sallies of the rapparees, the swordsmen, masterless now, of the defeated James Stuart".

There is a folk song (of 19th century origin - see the reference to "Peelers"), devoted to the Rapparee:

How green are the fields that washed the Finn
How grand are the houses the Peelers live in
How fresh are the crops in the valleys to see
But the heath is the home of the wild rapparee

Ah, way out on the moors where the wind shrieks and howls
Sure, he'll find his lone home there amongst the wild foul
No one there to welcome, no comrade was he
Ah, God help the poor outlaw, the wild rapparee

He robbed many rich of their gold and their crown
He outrode the soldiers who hunted him down
Alas, he has boasted, They'll never take me,
Not a swordsman will capture the wild rapparee

There's a stone covered grave on the wild mountainside.
There's a plain wooden cross on which this is inscribed:
Kneel down, dear stranger, say an Ave for me
I was sentenced to death being a wild rapparee

== See also ==
- Willy Brennan
- Liam Deois
- Shane Bernagh
- Éamonn an Chnoic
- James Freney
- Black Francis Corrigan
- Captain Gallagher
- Galloping Hogan
- Colonel John Hurley
- Tomás Bán Mac Aodhagáin
- Dubhaltach Caoch Mac Coisdealbhaigh
- Tomás Láidir Mac Coisdealbhaigh
- Seamus McMurphy
- Madden Raparees GAC
- Donogh Dáll Ó Derrig
- Redmond O'Hanlon (outlaw)
- Neesy O'Haughan
- Dónal Ó Maoláine
- Shane Crossagh O'Mullan
