= Kotovka =

Kotovka Котовка
- Khutor
- Location within Voronezh Oblast Location within Russia
- Coordinates: 49°57′N 40°54′E
- Country: Russia
- Region: Voronezh Oblast
- District: Petropavlovsky District
- Time zone: UTC+3:00

Kotovka (Russian: Котовка) is a rural locality (a khutor) in Novolimanskoye Rural Settlement, Petropavlovsky District, Voronezh Oblast, Russia. The population was 228 as of 2010.

== Geography ==
Kotovka is located 19 km east of Petropavlovka (the district's administrative centre) by road. Progoreloye is the nearest rural locality.
