= Billy Hurley (footballer) =

English footballer

Personal information
- Date of birth: 11 December 1959 (age 66)
- Place of birth: Leytonstone, England
- Position: Forward

Senior career*
Years	Team	Apps	(Gls)
1976–1977	Orient	1	(0)

International career
1975	England Schoolboys	9	(7)
- * Club domestic league appearances and goals

William Henry Hurley (born 11 December 1959 in Leytonstone, London Borough of Waltham Forest) is an English former professional footballer who played in the Football League, as a forward.

As a 17-year-old, Hurley was named in the Orient squad against Chelsea in April 1977. He was also named in the team list in 1976 after appearing nine times for England's schoolboy squad.
