= Cerro Veronese =

- Comune
- Comune di Cerro Veronese
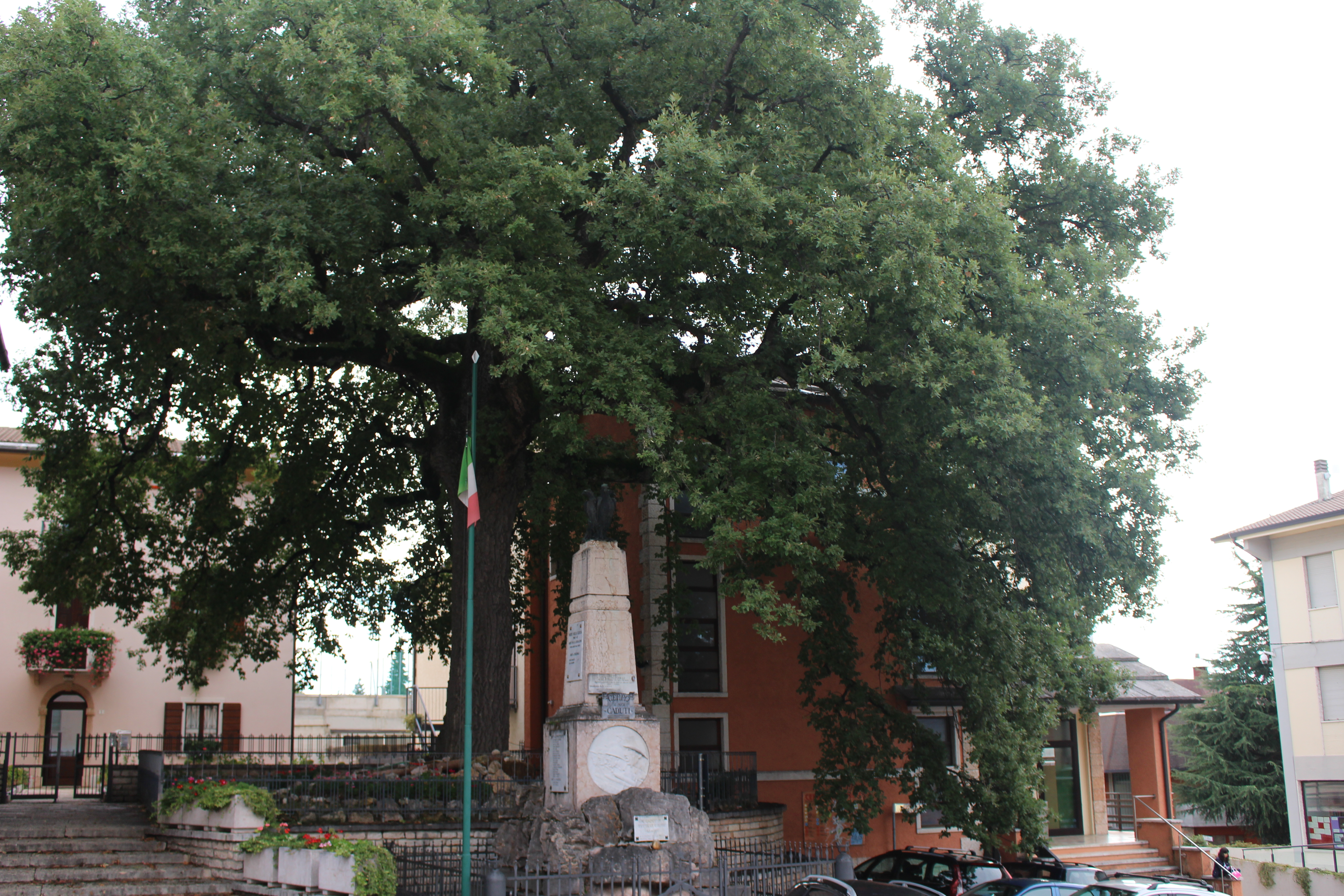

- Location within Italy Location within Veneto
- Coordinates: 45°34′N 11°2′E
- Country: Italy
- Region: Veneto
- Province: Province of Verona (VR)

Area
  - Total: 10.2 km^{2} (3.9 sq mi)
- Elevation: 730 m (2,400 ft)

Population (Dec. 2004)
  - Total: 2,274
  - Density: 223/km^{2} (577/sq mi)
- Demonym: Cerresi
- Time zone: UTC+1 (CET)
  - Summer (DST): UTC+2 (CEST)
- Postal code: 37020
- Dialing code: 045
- Website: Official website

Cerro Veronese (Cimbrian: kame Cire; Venetian: El Sèro) is a comune (municipality) in the Province of Verona in the Italian region Veneto, located about 100 kilometres (62 mi) west of Venice and about 15 kilometres (9 mi) north of Verona. As of 31 December 2004, it had a population of 2,274 and an area of 10.2 square kilometres (3.9 mi^{2}). It is part of the Thirteen Communities, a group of villages which historically speak the Cimbrian language.

Cerro Veronese borders the following municipalities: Bosco Chiesanuova, Grezzana, and Roverè Veronese.

== Celebrations ==
=== Sant'Osvaldo ===
Cerro people used to celebrate their saint protector, Saint Oswald, every 5 August with a religious ceremony in the main church. In addition, the celebration lasts a pair of days with local food stands (in particular typical salami and cheese) and popular fairs.

=== Fragolosa ===
Also known as Festa della fragola (Strawberry festival), it's the most important event concerning a typical fruit of the region, strawberry (in Italian fragola). It's the most awaited celebration after Giocondo's death. Fragolosa is mainly celebrated on the second weekend of July and is one week long. A lot of stands are exposed, especially in the Piazza Alferia, the largest square of the town.

== Demographic evolution ==
Historical population

Year	Pop.	±%
1861	?	—
1871	753	—
1881	894	+18.7%
1901	984	+10.1%
1911	1,122	+14.0%

Year	Pop.	±%
1921	1,156	+3.0%
1931	1,161	+0.4%
1936	991	−14.6%
1951	1,026	+3.5%
1961	940	−8.4%

Year	Pop.	±%
1971	1,066	+13.4%
1981	1,273	+19.4%
1991	1,495	+17.4%
2001	2,043	+36.7%

Source: Data from ISTAT
