= Siege of Limerick (1690) =

1690 siege

Coordinates: 52°39′55″N 8°37′26″W

- Part of the Williamite War in Ireland
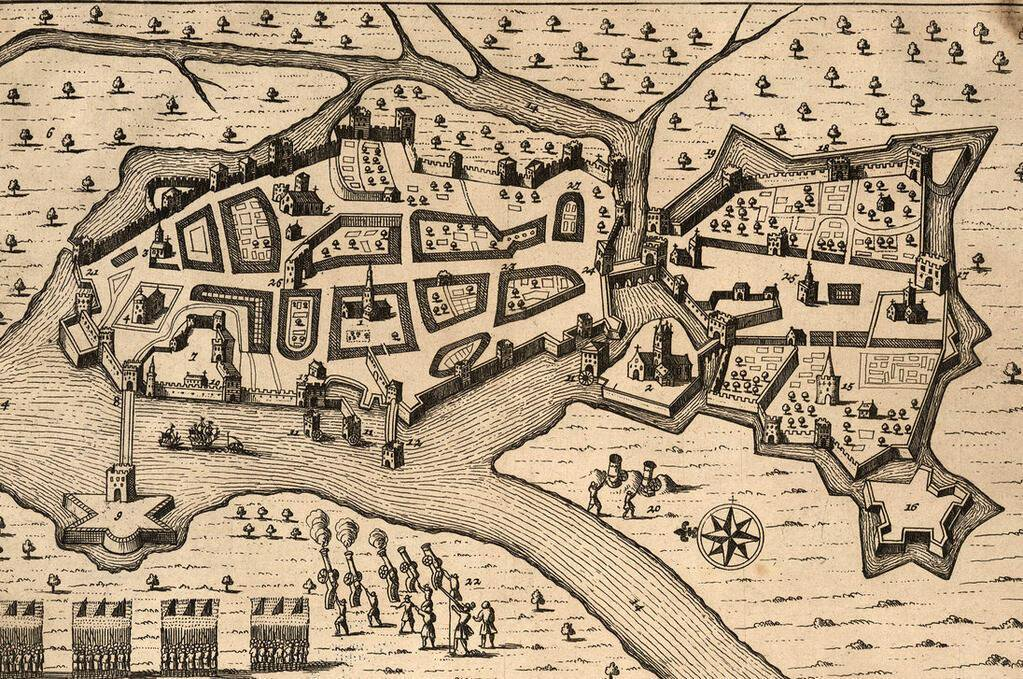
- A 1690 etching of the siege
Date	August–September 1690
Location	Limerick, Ireland
Result	Jacobite/French victory

Belligerents
Williamites	Jacobites France

Commanders and leaders
William III of England	Marquis de Boisseleau; Earl of Tyrconnell; Earl of Lucan

Strength
25,000 men	14,500 infantry in Limerick; 2,500 cavalry in Clare

Casualties and losses
~3,000 killed in assault 2,000 died of disease	~400 killed in action

Limerick, a city in western Ireland, was besieged twice in the Williamite War in Ireland in 1689–1691. On the first occasion, in August to September 1690, its Jacobite defenders retreated to the city after their defeat at the Battle of the Boyne. The Williamites, under William III, tried to take Limerick by storm but were driven off and had to retire into their winter quarters.

== Strategic background ==
Following the successful defence of Derry and the Siege of Carrickfergus, the Jacobites had lost control over the north of Ireland by late 1689. Their defeat at the Battle of the Boyne on 1 July 1690 saw their forces make a disorderly retreat from the eastern part of the country and abandon the capital, Dublin, in the process. James II himself had fled Ireland for France since he judged his military prospects to be hopeless. The Irish Jacobites still in the field found themselves in the same position as the Catholic Confederates of a generation before in holding an enclave behind the River Shannon, based on the cities of Limerick and Galway. The main Jacobite army had retreated to Limerick after its defeat at the Boyne.

Some of their senior commanders, in particular Richard Talbot, 1st Earl of Tyrconnell, wanted to surrender to the Williamites while they could still get good terms, but they were overruled by Irish officers such as Patrick Sarsfield, who wanted to fight on. The principal reason that many Jacobite officers were reluctant to surrender was the harsh surrender terms published by William in Dublin after his victory at the Boyne. The terms offered a pardon only to the Jacobite rank and file and not to the officers or the landowning class. The Jacobite French commander, Lauzun, also wanted to surrender, expressed his dismay at the state of Limerick's fortifications and said that they could be "knocked down by roasted apples".

There were, however, sufficient Jacobite troops to defend Limerick. A total of 14,500 Jacobite infantry were billeted in Limerick itself and another 2,500 cavalry in County Clare under Sarsfield. Moreover, the morale of the ordinary soldiers was high, despite the defeat at the Boyne. That was due to the circulation of an ancient Irish prophecy that the Irish would win a great victory over the English outside Limerick and drive them out of Ireland. That may seem bizarre, but such prophecies were then an important part of Irish popular culture. Williamites mocked such superstition in songs such as Lillibullero.

Lauzun's deputy, Marquis de Boisseleau, backed the hardliners in their attempts to defend the city and oversaw improvements to Limerick's defences.

== Sarsfield's raid at Ballyneety ==
William of Orange and his army reached Limerick on 7 August 1690 with 25,000 men and occupied Ireton's fort and Cromwell's fort (built during the Siege of Limerick (1650–1651)) outside the city. However, he had with him only his field artillery, as his siege cannon were still making their way from Dublin with a light escort. The siege train was intercepted by Sarsfield's cavalry, (600 men guided by "Galloping Hogan") at Ballyneety, and destroyed, along with the Williamites' siege guns and ammunition. That meant that William had to wait another ten days before he could start bombarding Limerick in earnest while another siege train was brought up from Waterford.

== Assault on Limerick ==
By then, it was late August. Winter was approaching, and William wanted to finish the war in Ireland so that he could return to the Netherlands and get on with the main business of the War of the Grand Alliance against the French. For that reason, he decided on an all-out assault on Limerick.

His siege guns blasted a breach in the walls of the "Irish town" section of the city, and William launched his assault on 27 August. The breach was stormed by Danish grenadiers, but the Boisseleau had built an earthwork, or coupure, inside the walls and had erected barricades in the streets, impeding the attackers. The Danish grenadiers and the eight regiments who followed them into the breach suffered terribly from musketry and cannon fire at point blank range. Jacobite soldiers without arms and the civilian population (including, famously, the women) lined the walls and threw stones and bottles at the attackers. A regiment of Jacobite dragoons also made a sortie and attacked the Williamites in the breach from the outside. After three-and-a-half hours of fighting, William finally called off the assault.

== Williamites retire ==
William's men had suffered about 3,000 casualties, including many of their best Dutch, Danish, German and Huguenot troops. The Jacobites had lost only 400 men in the battle. The worsening weather made William call off the siege and put his troops into winter quarters, where another 2,000 of them died of disease. William himself left Ireland shortly afterwards and returned to London. He then went to take command of Allied forces fighting in Flanders and left Godert de Ginkell to command in Ireland. The following year, Ginkell won a significant victory at the Battle of Aughrim.

Following the siege, William Dorrington was made governor of the city and preparations began to improve the fortifications. Limerick was to remain a Jacobite stronghold until it surrendered after another Williamite siege the following year. After the loss of the last major stronghold, Patrick Sarsfield led the army into exile in the Flight of the Wild Geese to the Continent, where they continued to serve the cause of James and his successors.

== Bibliography ==
- Childs, John. The Williamite Wars in Ireland. Bloomsbury Publishing, 2007.
- Simms, J.G. Jacobite Ireland, London 1969.
- Mangan, H. (1903). "Sieges of Derry and Limerick" . In O'Brien, R. Barry (ed.). Studies in Irish History, 1649-1775. Dublin: Browne and Nolan. pp. 1–65.
- Wauchop, Piers. Patrick Sarsfield and the Williamite War, Dublin 1992.
