= John Hurley (Jacobite) =

Colonel Sir John Hurley, Jacobite soldier and rapparee, fl. December 1694.

== Biography ==
Hurley was a son of William Hurly, 3rd Baronet, who was an M.P. for Kilmallock in 1689 and married Mary Blount, and a grandson of Sir Maurice Hurley of Knocklong, eldest son of Sir Thomas and Joanna daughter of John Brown of Mount Brown, County Limerick . He served in the army of King James II in Ireland, and afterwards became a rapparee.

Along with fellow rapparees colonel Dermot Leary, captain Edmond Ryan, captain Matthew Higgins and John Murphy, issued a proclamation in Dublin December 1694, attacking all those not loyal to James II of England. A reward of two hundred pounds was offered to anyone who brought to them any member of King William's privy council and a further fifty pounds for any chief officers still in arms against king James. He was arrested from which he later escaped to France and may have served in the Berwick's Regiment. (p. 92)

He was a cousin of Luis Roberto de Lacy (1772–1817), brigadier general of the Spanish Army who fought for Spain in the Peninsular War.

== Family tree ==
    Teige Ó hUirthile, lord of Knocklong, County Limerick and Chief of the Name 
    |
    |____________________________________
    |                                 | 
    |                                 |
    Dermod                            Tomás Ó hUirthile, fl. 1585.
   =?                                =?   
    |                                 |
    |                                 |_______________
    Juliana                           |             |
   =Edmond Óge de Courcy              |             |
    |                                 Randal        Maurice Ó hUirthile of Knocklong, fl. 1601-34.
    |                                              =Racia Thornton (dsp)  =Gráinne Ní hÓgáin
    John, 18th Baron Kingsale                                          |
                                                                           |
                                                                           Sir Thomas O'Hurley
                                                                          =Joanna Brown of Mount Brown, Limerick
                                                                           |
    _______________________________________________________________________|____________________________________
    |                                    |                         |                          |                |
    |                                    |                         |                          |                | 
    Sir Maurice, died c. 1683.           Catherine                 Anne                       Grace            Elinora
   =?                                    =Peirce, Lord Dunboyne    =Daniel Ó Maoilriain   =Walter Bourke   =David Barry
    |                             
    |                             
    Sir William Hurly, 3rd Baronet      
   =Mary Blount 
    |                             
    |             
    Colonel Sir John Hurley
    |
    |
    Charles Hurley
    |
    |
    Donogh Hurley
    = Anne Blennerhass
    |
    |
    John Hurley
    = Mary Crowly
    |
    |
    Timothy Hurley
    = Mary Stanley 
    |
    |
    Daniel Hurley
    = Julia Driscoll

== See also ==
- Diarmaid Ó hUrthuile, Archbishop of Cashel, c. 1530 – 21 June 1584.
- Sir William Hurly, 3rd Baronet.
- Hurly Baronets.
- Williamite War in Ireland.
