= Timolin =

Village in County Kildare, Ireland

Coordinates: 52°59′N 6°49′W

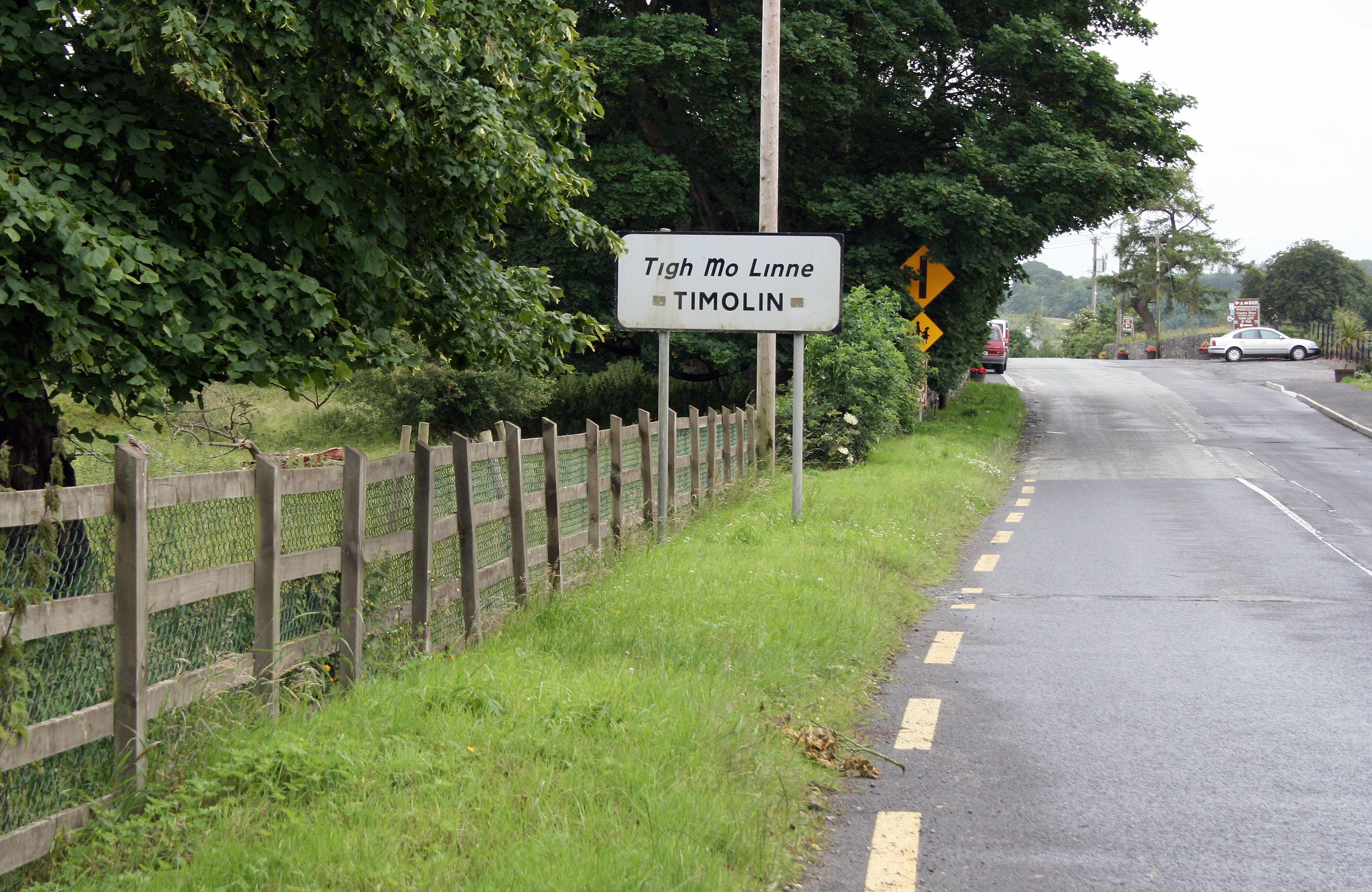
Timolin on the old N9

Timolin (Irish: Tigh Mo Linne, meaning 'Moling's house') is a village in the south of County Kildare, Ireland. It is located off the R448 road, the former N9 road (now by-passed by the M9 motorway) about 80 km (50 mi) south of Dublin. It is a small village, with less than a hundred inhabitants, one shop and two pubs. It is located close to the Moone High Cross Inn. The closest village to Timolin is Moone, less than 1 kilometre to the south. The village is in a townland and civil parish of the same name.

== Public transport ==
The village is served by bus route 880 operated by Kildare & South Dublin Local Link. There are several buses each day including Sunday linking the village to Castledermot, Carlow and Naas as well as villages in the area.

== History ==
During the Irish Confederate Wars of the 1640s Timolin was the scene of a notorious massacre. A stronghouse in the village, in which many civilians were sheltering, was attacked by an army under Ormonde. After it had been captured around 200 civilians were killed.

== See also ==
- List of towns and villages in Ireland
- List of abbeys and priories in Ireland (County Kildare)
