= William Hurly, 3rd Baronet =

Sir William Hurly, 3rd Baronet (died 1691) was an Anglo-Irish Jacobite politician.

Hurly (Hurley) was the son of Sir Maurice Hurly (Hurley), 2nd Baronet and Margaret O'Dwyer, and in 1684 he succeeded to his father's baronetcy. An adherent of James II after the Glorious Revolution, in 1689 he was the Member of parliament for Kilmallock in the Irish House of Commons during the Patriot Parliament. Owing to his support for the Jacobite cause, Hurly was attainted in 1691 and forfeited his estates and title.

He married Mary Blount, by whom he had a least one son, colonel John Hurley, who served in James II's army.

Parliament of Ireland
Preceded by Murrough Boyle; Brook Bridges	Member of Parliament for Kilmallock; 1689; With: John Lacy	Succeeded by John Ormsby; Robert Ormsby
Baronetage of England
Preceded by Maurice Hurly	Baronet (of Knocklong); 1684–1691	Forfeit
