= Galloping Hogan =

Michael "Galloping" Hogan was an Irish rapparee or brigand following the Cromwellian conquest of Ireland.

He was born in the parish of Doon, at the foot of the Slieve Phelim hills in East Limerick, and was possibly a relatively wealthy landowner before becoming a rapparee.

Under his guidance in 1690, Patrick Sarsfield and 500 Jacobite troops blew up the Williamite siege train at Ballyneety, County Limerick. One eyewitness account says that Galloping Hogan was given the honour of lighting the fuse.

The Williamite war continued until the Treaty of Limerick was signed in October 1691, but Galloping Hogan refused to accept the treaty and carried on the struggle for a further six months before leaving Ireland from Cork in late Spring of 1692 with the last contingent of Wild Geese.

He went to France, where he became a general. In 1706 he was forced to leave France as he reputedly killed a fellow officer in a duel in Flanders. He fled to Portugal, where he continued his military career. Years later he ended his career as a senior officer in the Portuguese army.

In May 1712 he contributed to the victory of the Portuguese Army against the Spanish at the battle of Campo Maior, Portugal. He remained in Portugal until his death, and reared a family whose descendants still live in Portugal.
