= Sexdrega =

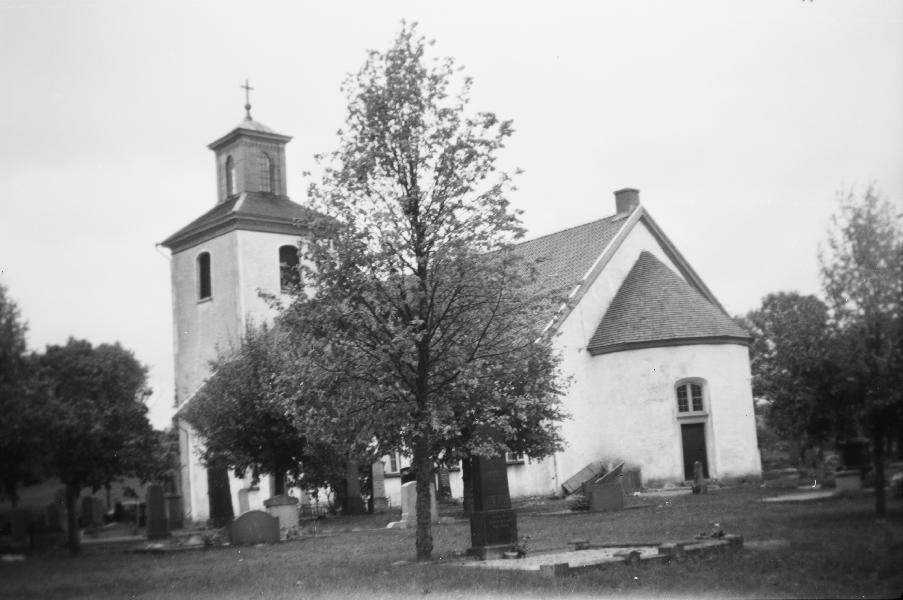
- Sexdrega Church

- Location within Västra Götaland Location within Sweden
- Coordinates: 57°35′N 13°07′E
- Country: Sweden
- Province: Västergötland
- County: Västra Götaland County
- Municipality: Svenljunga Municipality

Area
  - Total: 0.92 km^{2} (0.36 sq mi)

Population (31 December 2010)
  - Total: 787
  - Density: 860/km^{2} (2,200/sq mi)
- Time zone: UTC+1 (CET)
  - Summer (DST): UTC+2 (CEST)

Sexdrega is a locality situated in Svenljunga Municipality, Västra Götaland County, Sweden with 787 inhabitants in 2010.

== Sports ==
Their local football club is FC Lockryd.
