= Hurly baronets =

Forfeited baronetcy in the Baronetage of Ireland

The Hurly Baronetcy, of Knocklong in County Limerick, was a title in the Baronetage of Ireland. It was created circa 1645 for Thomas Hurly. The 3rd Baronet was attainted in 1691 for his part in the Williamite War in Ireland, and the baronetcy was forfeited.

== Hurly baronets, of Knocklong (c. 1645) ==
- Sir Thomas Hurly, 1st Baronet (died c. 1647)
- Sir Maurice Hurly, 2nd Baronet (died c. 1684)
- Sir William Hurly, 3rd Baronet (died 1691)
