= Ballyneety =

Village in County Limerick, Ireland

Ballyneety Baile an Fhaoitigh
- Village
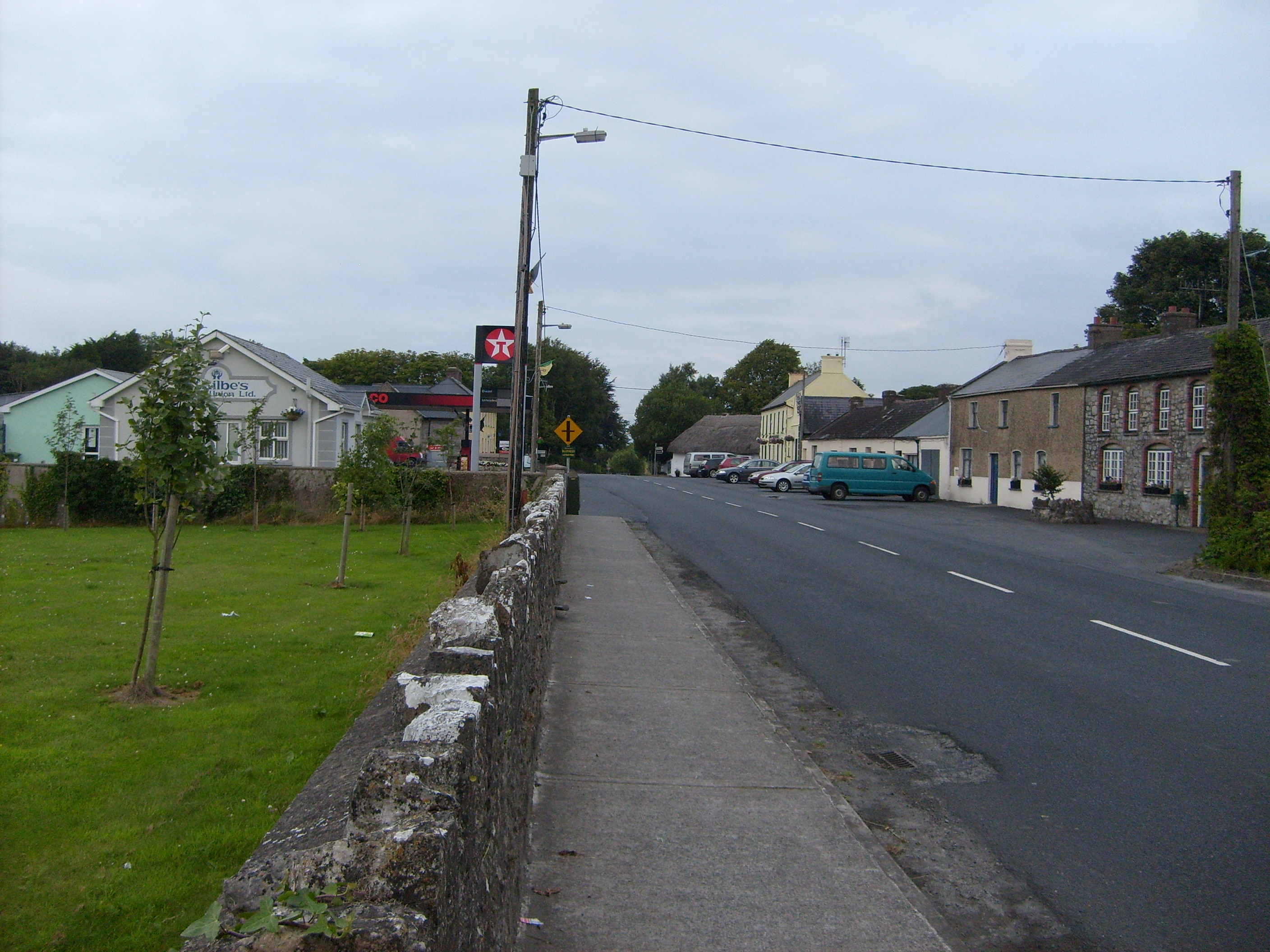

- Location in Ireland
- Coordinates: 52°35′50.7″N 08°32′55.2″W
- Country: Ireland
- Province: Munster
- County: County Limerick

Population (2022)
  - Total: 586
- Time zone: UTC+0 (WET)
  - Summer (DST): UTC+1 (IST (WEST))

Ballyneety (Irish: Baile an Fhaoitigh, meaning 'Town of An Faoiteach, from the surname de Faoite') is a village in County Limerick, Ireland, located approximately 10 km from Limerick city.

The village has an 18-hole golf course, petrol station, several takeaway restaurants, a pub, a post office, a garden centre, a car dealership, a credit union, a Garda station, and a funeral home.

== Local residents ==
- Dermot O'Hurley (c.1530 - 20 June 1584), one of the 24 Irish Catholic Martyrs. While born into the Gaelic nobility of Ireland at or near Emly, the future Archbishop of Cashel was raised at Lickadoon Castle, near Ballyneety.
- Paul O'Connell, rugby player who captained Ireland, Munster and the British and Irish Lions, was born in Drombanna, near Ballyneety

== See also ==
- Siege of Limerick (1690)#Sarsfield's raid at Ballyneety
