= List of New York fire departments =

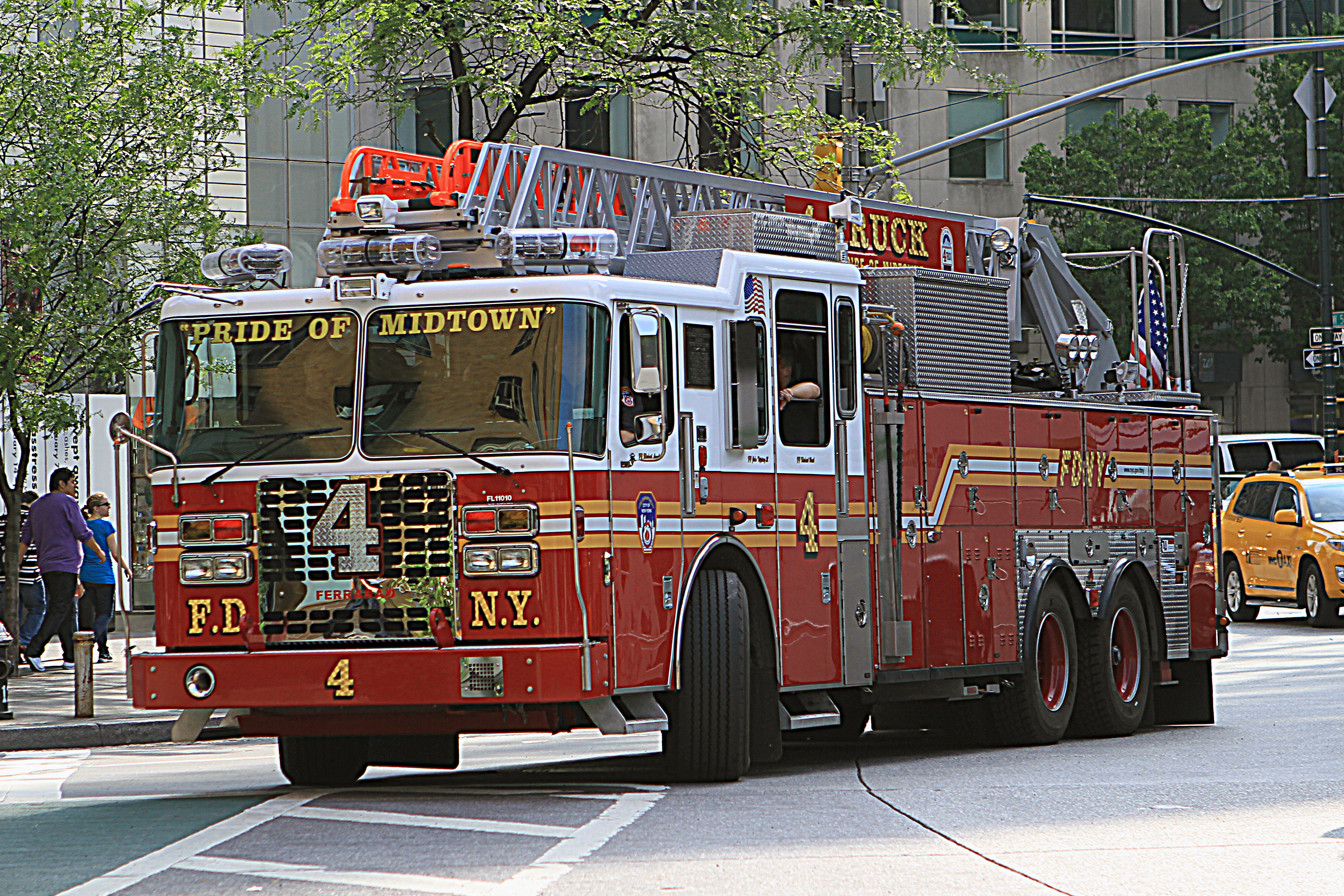
A typical New York City Fire Department (FDNY) Ladder Company, also known as a ladder truck. Pictured is an Aerial Ladder Truck operated by Ladder Co. 4, quartered in Manhattan.

This is a list of fire departments in New York.

== New York fire departments ==
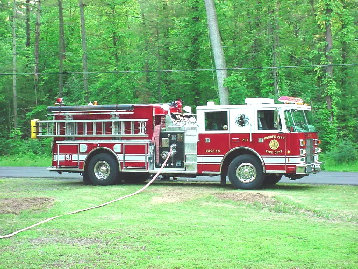
A Border City Fire Department truck

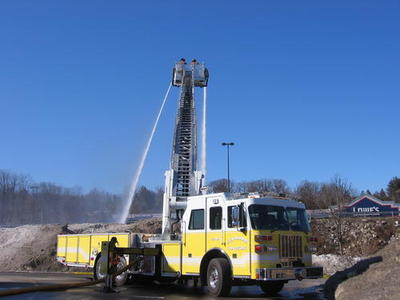
New Hamburg Fire Department's tower ladder 53–45 at Department Training in 2009

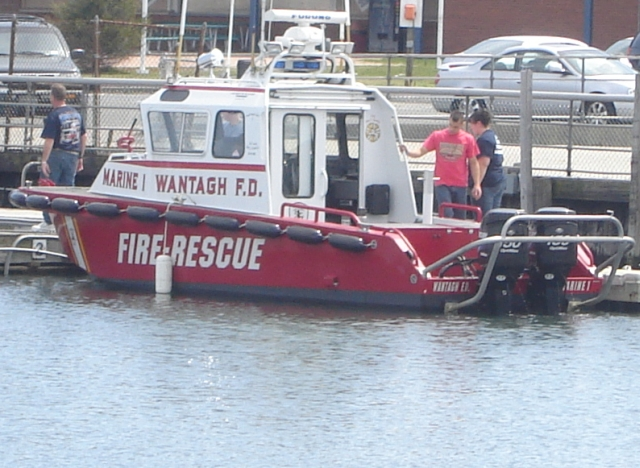
Wantagh Fire Department's Marine One docked at Wantagh Park

=== New York City ===
==== Manhattan ====
- Rescue 1 (Borough Wide/Hell's Kitchen)
- Engine 1/Ladder 24/Division 3 (Midtown Manhattan)
- Engine 3/Ladder 12/High Rise Unit 1/Battalion 7 (Chelsea)
- Engine 4/Ladder 15/Decon Unit 4 (Financial District)
- Engine 5/Foam 5 (Stuyvesant Town)
- Engine 6 (Lower Manhattan)
- Engine 7/Ladder 1/Battalion 1 (Civic Center)
- Engine 8/Ladder 2/Battalion 8 (Midtown Manhattan)
- Engine 9/Ladder 6/Satellite 1 (Chinatown)
- Engine 10/Ladder 10 (World Trade Center)
- Engine 14 (Chelsea/Madison Square Garden)
- Engine 15/Ladder 18/Battalion 4 (Lower East Side)
- Engine 16/Ladder 7/FDR 1 (Gramercy)
- Squad 18 (Borough Wide/West Village)
- Engine 21 (Turtle Bay)
- Engine 22/Ladder 13/FDR 2/Battalion 10 (Yorkville)
- Engine 23 (Columbus Circle)
- Engine 24/Ladder 5/Battalion 2 (Greenwich Village)
- Engine 26 (Garment Center)
- Engine 28/Ladder 11 (Alphabet City/Lower East Side)
- Engine 33/Ladder 9 (East Village)
- Engine 34/Ladder 21 (Hell's Kitchen)
- Engine 35/Ladder 14/Battalion 12 (East Harlem)
- Engine 37/Ladder 40 (Manhattanville)
- Engine 39/Ladder 16/High Rise Unit 2 (Upper East Side)
- Engine 40/Ladder 35 (Upper West Side/Lincoln Square)
- Engine 44/Haz Mat Tech Unit 44 (Upper East Side)
- Engine 47/RAC 1 (Morningside Heights)
- Engine 53/Ladder 43 (Spanish Harlem)
- Engine 54/Ladder 4/Battalion 9 (Theater District)
- Engine 55 (Little Italy)
- Engine 58/Ladder 26 (Harlem)
- Engine 59/Ladder 30 (Harlem)
- Engine 65 (Times Square)
- Engine 67 (Washington Heights)
- Engine 69/Ladder 28/Battalion 16 (Harlem)
- Engine 74 (Upper West Side)
- Engine 76/Ladder 22/Thawing Unit 76/Battalion 11 (Manhattan Valley/Upper West Side)
- Engine 80/Ladder 23 (Manhattanville)
- Engine 84/Ladder 34 (Washington Heights)
- Engine 91 (Spanish Harlem)
- Engine 93/Ladder 45/Battalion 13 (Washington Heights)
- Engine 95/Ladder 36/Foam 95 (Inwood)
- Ladder 3/Battalion 6 (Union Square)
- Ladder 8 (Tribeca)
- Ladder 20/Rescue 6/Division 1 (Soho)
- Ladder 25/Collapse Rescue 1 (Upper West Side)
- Marine 1 (Waterfront)
- Special Ops Command (Roosevelt Island)

==== Brooklyn ====
- Squad 1/Technical Response Vehicle (Borough Wide/Park Slope)
- Rescue 2/Collapse Rescue 2 (Borough Wide/Ocean Hill)
- Ladder 102/Battalion 34 (Williamsburg)
- Engine 201/Ladder 114/Battalion 40 (Bay Ridge/Sunset Park)
- Engine 202/Ladder 101/Battalion 32 (Red Hook)
- Engine 205/Ladder 118 (Brooklyn Heights)
- Engine 206/Foam 206 (East Williamsburg)
- Engine 207/Ladder 110/Satellite 6/Battalion 31/Division 11 (Ft. Greene)
- Engine 210 (Ft. Greene)
- Engine 211/Ladder 119 (Williamsburg)
- Engine 214/Ladder 111 (Bedford-Stuyvesant)
- Engine 216/Ladder 108/Battalion 35 (Williamsburg)
- Engine 217 (Bedford-Stuyvesant)
- Engine 218 (Bushwick)
- Engine 219/Ladder 105 (Ft. Greene)
- Engine 220/Ladder 122 (Park Slope)
- Engine 221/Ladder 104 (Williamsburg)
- Engine 222/Battalion 37 (Bedford-Stuyvesant/Bushwick)
- Engine 224 (Brooklyn Heights)
- Engine 225/Ladder 107/Battalion 39 (New Lots/East New York)
- Engine 226 (Downtown Brooklyn)
- Engine 227 (Brownsville)
- Engine 228/Alternate Fuel Response Unit 2 (Sunset Park)
- Engine 229/Ladder 146/Alternate Fuel Response Unit 1 (Greenpoint)
- Engine 230 (Bedford-Stuyvesant)
- Engine 231/Ladder 120/Battalion 44 (Brownsville)
- Engine 233/Ladder 176/Field Comm 1 (Ocean Hill)
- Engine 234/Ladder 123/Battalion 38 (Bedford-Stuyvesant)
- Engine 235/Battalion 57 (Bedford-Stuyvesant)
- Engine 236 (New Lots/East New York)
- Engine 237 (Bushwick)
- Engine 238/Ladder 106/Foam Tender 238 (Greenpoint)
- Engine 239 (Park Slope)
- Engine 240/Battalion 48 (Windsor Terrace)
- Engine 241/Ladder 109 (Bay Ridge)
- Engine 242 (Bay Ridge)
- Engine 243/Ladder 168/Battalion 42 (Bath Beach)
- Engine 245/Ladder 161/Battalion 43 (Coney Island)
- Engine 246/Ladder 169 (Sheepshead Bay/Brighton Beach)
- Engine 247/Foam 247/Thawing Unit 64 (Boro Park)
- Engine 248/Battalion 41 (Flatbush)
- Engine 249/Ladder 113 (Flatbush)
- Engine 250 (Parkville)
- Squad 252 (Borough Wide/Bushwick)
- Engine 253 (Bensonhurst)
- Engine 254/Ladder 153 (Gravesend)
- Engine 255/Ladder 157 (Flatbush)
- Engine 257/Ladder 170/Highway Response Unit 170/Battalion 58 (Canarsie)
- Engine 271/Ladder 124/Battalion 28 (Wyckoff Heights)
- Engine 276/Ladder 156/Battalion 33 (Midwood/Flatlands)
- Engine 277/Ladder 112 (Bushwick)
- Engine 279/Ladder 131 (Red Hook)
- Engine 280/Ladder 132 (Prospect Park North)
- Engine 281/Ladder 147 (Flatbush)
- Engine 282/Ladder 148 (Boro Park)
- Engine 283/Division 15 (Brownsville)
- Engine 284/Ladder 149/Satellite 3 (Dyker Heights)
- Engine 290/Ladder 103 (East New York)
- Engine 309/Ladder 159/Highway Response Unit 159 (Flatlands)
- Engine 310/Ladder 174 (East Flatbush)
- Engine 318/Ladder 166 (Coney Island)
- Engine 321/Foam 321/Brush Fire Unit 6 (Marine Park)
- Engine 323 (Mill Basin)
- Engine 330/Ladder 172/Thawing Unit 330 (Bensonhurst)
- Engine 332/Ladder 175 (East New York)
- Marine 6 (Waterfront)
- Gerrittsen Beach V.F.D.

==== Bronx ====
- Rescue 3/Collapse Rescue 3 (Borough Wide/Bathgate)
- Engine 38/Ladder 51 (Eastchester)
- Squad 41 (Borough Wide/Melrose)
- Engine 42 (Mt. Hope)
- Engine 43/Ladder 59 (Morris Heights)
- Engine 45/Ladder 58/Battalion 18 (West Farms)
- Engine 46/Ladder 27 (Tremont)
- Engine 48/Ladder 56/Division 7 (Fordham)
- Engine 50/Ladder 19/Battalion 26 (Morrisania)
- Engine 52/Ladder 52 (Riverdale)
- Engine 60/Ladder 17/Battalion 14 (Mott Haven/South Bronx)
- Squad 61/Battalion 20 (Borough Wide/Westchester)
- Engine 62/Ladder 32 (Olinville)
- Engine 63/Ladder 39/Battalion 15 (Wakefield)
- Engine 64/Ladder 47 (Castle Hill)
- Engine 66/Ladder 61 (Co-op City)
- Engine 68/Ladder 49 (Highbridge)
- Engine 70/Ladder 53 (City Island)
- Engine 71/Ladder 55/Division 6 (Melrose/South Bronx)
- Engine 72/Satellite 2 (Throgs Neck)
- Engine 73/Ladder 42 (East Morrisania)
- Engine 75/Ladder 33/Battalion 19 (Fordham)
- Engine 79/Ladder 37/Battalion 27 (Norwood)
- Engine 81/Ladder 46 (Kingsbridge)
- Engine 82/Ladder 31 (West Farms/South Bronx)
- Engine 83/Ladder 29 (Pt. Morris)
- Engine 88/Ladder 38 (Belmont)
- Engine 89/Ladder 50 (Throgs Neck)
- Engine 90/Ladder 41 (Van Nest)
- Engine 92/Ladder 44/Battalion 17 (Morrisania/South Bronx)
- Engine 94/Ladder 48/Battalion 3 (Hunts Point)
- Engine 96/Ladder 54/Foam 96 (Clason Point)
- Engine 97/Thawing Unit 97 (Eastchester)
- Edgewater Park Volunteer Hose Co. #1

==== Queens ====
- Ladder 116/Collapse Rescue 4 (Queensbridge)
- Engine 251 (Glen Oaks)
- Engine 258/Ladder 115 (Long Island City)
- Engine 259/Ladder 128/Battalion 45 (Sunnyside)
- Engine 260/Foam 260 (Ravenswood)
- Engine 262 (South Astoria)
- Engine 263/Ladder 117 (Astoria Heights)
- Engine 264/Engine 328/Ladder 134 (Far Rockaway)
- Engine 265/Ladder 121/Battalion 47 (Edgemere)
- Engine 266/Thawing Unit 266/Brush Fire Unit 7 (Seaside/Rockaway Beach)
- Engine 268/Ladder 137 (Rockaway Park)
- Squad 270/Division 13 (Borough Wide/Richmond Hill)
- Engine 273/Ladder 129 (Downtown Flushing)
- Engine 274/Battalion 52 (Flushing)
- Engine 275/Ladder 133 (St. Albans/South Jamaica)
- Engine 285/Ladder 142 (Ozone Park)
- Engine 286/Ladder 135 (Glendale)
- Engine 287/Ladder 136/Battalion 46 (Elmhurst)
- Squad 288/Haz-Mat 1 (Borough Wide/Maspeth)
- Engine 289/Ladder 138 (Corona)
- Engine 291/Ladder 140 (Ridgewood)
- Engine 292/Rescue 4 (Woodside - R4 runs Borough Wide)
- Engine 293/Thawing Unit 65 (Woodhaven)
- Engine 294/Foam 294/Ladder 143 (Richmond Hill)
- Engine 295/Ladder 144 (Whitestone)
- Engine 297/Ladder 130 (College Point)
- Engine 298/Ladder 127/Battalion 50 (Hillside/Jamaica)
- Engine 299/Ladder 152 (Utopia)
- Engine 301/Ladder 150 (Hollis)
- Engine 302/Ladder 155 (Rochdale)
- Engine 303/Ladder 126 (South Jamaica)
- Engine 304/Ladder 162 (Queens Village)
- Engine 305/Ladder 151 (Forest Hills)
- Engine 306 (Bayside)
- Engine 307/Ladder 154 (Jackson Heights)
- Engine 308/JFK Hose Wagon/Battalion 51 (Ozone Park)
- Engine 311/Ladder 158 (Brookville/Springfield Gardens)
- Engine 312/Battalion 49 (Astoria)
- Engine 313/Ladder 164 (Douglaston)
- Engine 314 (Rosedale)
- Engine 315/Ladder 125 (Hillcrest)
- Engine 316/LaGuardia Hose Wagon 316 (East Elmhurst)
- Engine 317/Ladder 165/Battalion 54 (St. Albans)
- Engine 319 (Middle Village)
- Engine 320/Ladder 167 (Bayside)
- Engine 324/Satellite 4/Division 14 (Corona)
- Engine 325/Ladder 163 (Woodside)
- Engine 326/Ladder 160/Battalion 53 (Oakland Gardens)
- Engine 329/Manifold Wagon 329/ATRV 329 (Ft. Tilden)
- Engine 331/Ladder 173 (Howard Beach)
- F.D.N.Y. Maintenance Shops
- Broad Channel V.F.D.
- Point Breeze V.F.D.
- Rockaway Point V.F.D.
- Roxbury V.F.D.
- West Hamilton Beach V.F.D. & Amb. Corps

==== Staten Island ====
- Squad 8/Squad 8 Haz Mat Tech Unit (Borough Wide/Chelsea)
- Engine 151/Ladder 76/Thawing Unit 151 (Tottenville)
- Engine 152/Foam 152/Battalion 21 (Rosebank)
- Engine 153/Ladder 77 (Stapleton)
- Engine 155/Ladder 78 (New Brighton)
- Engine 156/Brush Fire Unit 3 (West Brighton)
- Engine 157/Ladder 80 (Pt. Richmond)
- Engine 158/Brush Fire Unit 158/ATV 158 (Mariners Harbor)
- Engine 159/Satellite 5 (Dongan Hills)
- Engine 160/Rescue 5/Collapse Rescue 5/Brush Fire Unit 160/Special Ops Command 160/ATV 160/TAC Support Unit 2/Division 8 (Concord - Rescue 5 responds Borough Wide)
- Engine 161/Ladder 81/Brush Fire Unit 5 (South Beach)
- Engine 162/Ladder 82/Battalion 23 (Great Kills)
- Engine 163/Ladder 83 (Westerleigh)
- Engine 164/Ladder 84/Brush Fire Unit 1/Brush Fire Unit 164/ATV 164/MARC 164 (Huguenot)
- Engine 165/Ladder 85/Haz Mat Tech Unit 165 (New Dorp)
- Engine 166/Ladder 86/Brush Fire Unit 2 (Graniteville)
- Engine 167/Ladder 87/Foam 167/Brush Fire Unit 4 (Annadale)
- Engine 168 (Rossville)
- Ladder 79/Battalion 22 (West New Brighton/North Shore)
- Marine 9 (Waterfront)
- Metropolitan Fire Assoc. Inc.
- Oceanic Hook & Ladder Co. #1
- Richmond Engine Co. #1

=== Albany County ===
- 1 – Albany Fire Department (New York) (8 stations)
- 2 – Altamont Fire District Station 1
- 3 – Berne Fire District Station 66, 67 (2 stations)
- 4 – Boght Community Fire District 1
- 5 – Coeymans Fire District 1 (1 station)
- 6 – Coeymans Volunteer Fire Company Station 1
- 7 – Cohoes F.D. Station 1 (3 stations)
- 8 – Colonie Fire Company Station 1
- 9 – Delmar Fire District (2 stations)
- 10 – Elsmere Fire District
- 11 – Ft. Hunter Fire Dist.
- 12 – Fuller Rd. Fire Dist. #3
- 13 – Green Island Fire Dist.
- 14 – Guilderland Fire Dist.
- 15 – Guilderland Center Fire Dist.
- 16 – Knox Fire Dist. #16
- 17 – Latham Fire Dist. #4 (2 stations)
- 18 – Medusa Fire Dist. #18
- 19 – Maplewood Fire Dist. #5
- 20 – McKownville Fire Dist.
- 21 – Menands Fire Dist. #6
- 22 – Midway Fire Dist. #7 (2 stations)
- 23 – New Salem Fire Dist. #23 (2 stations)
- 24 – North Bethlehem V.F.D.
- 25 – Onesquethaw Fire Dist. #25 (3 stations)
- 26 – Ravena Hose Co. #8
- 27 – Rensselaerville Fire Dist. #27
- 28 – Schuyler Heights Fire Dist. #8
- 29 – Selkirk Fire Co. #4 (3 sta.'s)
- 30 – Shaker Road Loudonville Fire Dist. #9 (2 stations)
- 31 – Slingerlands Fire Dist. #1 (2 stations)
- 32 – Stanford Heights Fire Dist. #10 (2 stations)
- 33 – Tri Village Fire Dist. #33
- 34 – Verdoy Fire Dist. #11
- 35 – Voorheesville Fire Dist. #35
- 36 – Watervliet F.D.
- 37 – Albany International Airport#Airport Rescue FireFighting
- 38 – West Albany Fire Dist. #12 (2 stations)
- 39 – Westerlo Fire Dist. #39 (3 stations)
- 40 – Westmere Fire Dist.
- 41 – Watervliet Arsenal F.D.
- 50 – Altamont Rescue/Squad
- 51 – Delmar-Bethlehem E.M.S.
- 52 – Five Quad V.A.S.
- 53 – Helderberg Amb. Inc. (2 stations)
- 54 – Rensselaerville Amb. (disbanded)
- 55 – Albany Co. Sheriff's Office E.M.S./Town of Colonie E.M.S.
- 56 – Voorheesville Area Amb. Service
- 57 – Western Turnpike Rescue/Squad Inc.
- 58 – Ravena Rescue/Squad
- 59 – Westerlo Rescue/Squad Inc.

=== Allegany County ===
- A.E. Crandall Hook & Ladder Co. (Alfred, NY)
- Alfred Amb.
- Alfred Sta. V.F.C.
- Allentown V.F.C.
- Alma V.F.C. #1 Inc.
- Almond V.F.C. & Amb.
- Amity Rescue/Squad Inc. (Belmont, NY)
- Andover V.F.D. & V.A.C.
- Angelica Hose Co. #1 & Rescue/Squad
- Belfast V.F.D. & Amb.
- Belmont V.F.C.
- Birdsall V.F.D.
- Bolivar V.F.D. & Amb.
- Canaseraga V.F.D. & Amb.
- Caneadea V.F.D.
- Centerville Memorial V.F.D.
- Clarksville V.F.C. & Amb.
- Cuba V.F.D.
- Cuba Amb.
- William P. Brooks Hose Co. (Fillmore, NY)
- Friendship V.F.D.
- Friendship Amb. Squad
- Houghton V.F.D. & Amb.
- Medical Transport Services (Scio, NY)
- New Hudson V.F.C.
- Oramel V.F.D.
- Richburg V.F.C. Inc.
- Rushford V.F.D. & Amb.
- Scio V.F.C. (2 sta.'s)
- Short Tract V.F.D.
- Wellsville V.F.D. (3 sta.'s)
- Wellsville V.A.C.
- Whitesville V.F.D.
- Independence Emer. Squad (Whitesville, NY)
- Willing Vol. Hose Co. #1 (Wellsville, NY)
- Wiscoy-Rossburg V.F.C. Inc. (Fillmore, NY)
- Genesee V.F.D. (Genesee, PA)
- Shinglehouse V.F.D. (Shinglehouse, PA)
- Eldred Borough V.F.D. (Eldred, PA)

=== Broome County ===
- 21 – Binghamton Fire Department (5 stations)
- 22 – Deposit V.F.D. (Delaware Co.)
- 23 – Lisle V.F.C.
- 24 – Whitney Point V.F.D.
- 25 – Endicott F.D.
- 26 – Johnson City F.D. (2 stations)
- 27 – Binghamton Psychiatric Center F.D. (disbanded)
- 28 – Windsor V.F.C. (2 sta.'s)
- 29 – West Corners V.F.D. (2 sta.'s)
- 31 – Endwell F.D. (3 sta.'s)
- 32 – Vestal V.F.D. (4 sta.'s)
- 33 – Maine V.F.C.
- 34 – West Endicott Hose Co. #1
- 35 – Port Dickinson V.F.C.
- 36 – Killawog V.F.C.
- 37 – Port Crane V.F.C. (2 sta.'s)
- 38 – Kirkwood V.F.C. (2 sta.'s)
- 39 – Chenango Bridge V.F.C. Inc. (2 sta.'s)
- 40 – Broome Co. Public Safety
- 41 – Huron Campus Emergency Services (I.B.M.) (Endicott, NY)
- 42 – S.U.N.Y. Binghamton F.D. (disbanded)
- 43 – Harpursville V.F.D. (2 sta.'s)
- 44 – Chenango Forks V.F.C.
- 45 – G.S.A. Federal Bldg. (Binghamton, NY)
- 46 – Conklin V.F.C. (3 sta.'s)
- 47 – Glen Aubrey V.F.C. Inc. (2 sta.'s)
- 48 – Nanticoke V.F.C. Inc. (disbanded)
- 49 – Sanitaria Springs V.F.C.
- 51 – West Colesville V.F.C.
- 52 – Ouaquaga V.F.C.
- 53 – Union Center V.F.C. Inc. (2 sta.'s)
- 54 – West Windsor V.F.C. Inc.
- 55 – Hillcrest V.F.D.
- 56 – East Maine V.F.C.
- 57 – Choconut Center V.F.C. Inc.
- 58 – Town of Binghamton V.F.C. Inc. (3 sta.'s)
- 59 – Five Mile Point V.F.C. (2 sta.'s)
- 61 – Triangle V.F.C.
- 62 – Greater Binghamton Airport F.D.
- 63 – Prospect Terrace V.F.C.
- 64 – Castle Creek V.F.C. (disbanded)
- 65 – Broome Developmental Center F.D. (Binghamton, NY)
- 66 – Chenango V.F.C. Inc (2 sta.'s)
- 71 – City of Binghamton E.M.S.
- 72 – Broome Volunteer Emergency Squad (Binghamton, NY)
- 73 – Chenango Ambulance Services Inc.
- 74 – Colesville Volunteer Ambulance Service
- 75 – Deposit Emergency Squad (Delaware Co.)
- 76 – Harpur's Ferry Student Volunteer Ambulance Service (S.U.N.Y. Binghamton)
- 78 – Superior Ambulance (Binghamton, NY)
- 79 – Union Volunteer Emergency Squad (3 sta.'s)
- 81 – Vestal Volunteer Emergency Squad Inc.
- 82 – West Windsor Ambulance (disbanded)
- 83 – Whitney Point V.F.D. Emergency Squad (disbanded)
- 84 – Windsor Emergency Services (2 sta.'s)
- 85 – Maine Emergency Squad Inc.

=== Cattaraugus County ===
==== Dist. #1 ====
- Conewango V.F.D.
- Dayton V.F.C.
- Gowanda V.F.C. Co. Inc. (2 sta.'s)
- Leon V.F.C. #1
- Perrysburg V.F.C. #1 Inc.
- South Dayton V.F.C. #1 Inc.
- Versailles V.F.C.

==== Dist. #2 ====
- Arcade V.F.D. (Wyoming Co.)
- Delevan V.F.D. & Rescue/Squad
- Farmersville V.F.D.
- Franklinville V.F.D.
- Ischua V.F.D.
- Lyndon V.F.C.
- Machias V.F.D. (aka W.M. Weller Hose Co. Inc.)
- Yorkshire V.F.D. (aka Crystal Hose Co.)

==== Dist. #3 ====
- Allegany Indian Reservation V.F.D.
- Cattaraugus V.F.C. Inc.
- Cattaraugus Area Ambulance Service
- Coldspring V.F.C.
- East Randolph V.F.C. Inc.
- Frewsburg V.F.C. (2 sta.'s, both in Chautauqua Co.)
- Kill Buck V.F.D.
- Little Valley V.F.D.
- Randolph V.F.C. (2 sta.'s)
- Salamanca F.D. & Amb. (2 sta.'s)

==== Dist. #4 ====
- Allegany Engine Co. Inc. (2 sta.'s)
- Hinsdale F.D.
- Knapp Creek V.F.D.
- Limestone V.F.D. (aka Carrollton Joint Fire Dist.) (2 sta.'s)
- Olean City F.D. (2 sta.'s)
- Town of Olean V.F.D.
- Portville V.F.D.
- Westons Mills V.F.D. (aka Kinney Hose Co.)
- Trans Am Ambulance (Olean, NY)

==== Dist. #5 ====
- East Otto V.F.C. (aka William C. Edmunds V.F.C.)
- Ellicottville V.F.D.
- Great Valley V.F.C.
- Humphrey V.F.D.
- Otto V.F.C.
- Mansfield V.F.C.
- West Valley Vol. Hose Co. #1 (2 sta.'s)

=== Cayuga County ===
- 01 – Auburn F.D. (2 sta.'s)
- 02 – Aurelius V.F.D. (2 sta.'s)
- 03 – Aurora V.F.D.
- 04 – Cato V.F.D.
- 05 – Cayuga V.F.D.
- 06 – Fair Haven V.F.D.
- 07 – Fleming Fire Co. #1
- 08 – Fleming Fire Co. #2
- 09 – Genoa V.F.D.
- 10 – Ira V.F.D.
- 11 – King Ferry V.F.D.
- 12 – Locke V.F.D.
- 13 – Meridian V.F.D. (disbanded)
- 14 – Moravia V.F.C.
- 15 – Montezuma V.F.D.
- 16 – New Hope V.F.D.
- 17 – Owasco V.F.D. (2 sta.'s)
- 18 – Poplar Ridge V.F.C.
- 19 – Port Byron V.F.D.
- 20 – Scipio V.F.C.
- 21 – Sennett V.F.D. (2 sta.'s)
- 22 – Throop V.F.D.
- 23 – Union Springs V.F.D.
- 24 – Victory V.F.D.
- 25 – Weedsport V.F.D.
- 26 – Long Hill V.F.D.
- 27 – Sempronius V.F.C.
- 28 – West Niles V.F.C.
- 29 – Conquest V.F.C.
- American Medical Response (A.M.R.) (Throop, NY)
- Cato Ira Meridian Victory Ambulance Corps (C.I.M.V.A.C.)
- Four Town First Aid Squad (Moravia, NY)
- Southern Cayuga Instant Aid (Poplar Ridge, NY)
- TLC Ambulance (Auburn, NY)

=== Chautauqua County ===
==== Battalion 1 ====
- Dunkirk F.D. (3 sta.'s)
- Fredonia V.F.D.
- 10 – Cassadaga V.F.D.
- 11 – East Dunkirk V.F.C. #1
- 12 – West Dunkirk V.F.C. Inc.
- 13 – Forestville Fire Department, Inc
- 14 – Irving V.F.D.
- 15 – Lily Dale V.F.C.
- 16 – Sheridan V.F.D.
- 17 –
  - Silver Creek V.F.D.
  - Silver Creek Vol. Emer. Squad
- 18 – Stockton V.F.C. Inc.
- 19 – Sunset Bay V.F.C. #1 Inc.
- 51 – Hanover Hose Co. #1
- 60 – South Dayton V.F.C. #1 Inc. (Cattaraugus Co.)
- CCEMS Flycar Medic 71 (Sheridan, NY)
- CCEMS Ambulance 72 (Sheridan, NY)

==== Battalion 2 ====
- 20 – Brocton V.F.D.
- 21 – Chautauqua Fire Dist. #1
- 23 – Findley Lake V.F.D.
- 25 –
- - North Lake FD Station 22 (Dewittville)
- - North Lake FD Station 24 (Hartfield)
- - North Lake FD Station 25 (Mayville)
- 26 – Portland V.F.D. #1
- 27 – Ripley Hose Co. #1 (2 sta.'s)
- 28 – Stanley Hose Co. Inc.
- 29 – Westfield V.F.D.
- Chautauqua County Hazmat 7
- Chautauqua County Tech. Rescue
- CCEMS Flycar Medic 72 (Mayville, NY)

==== Battalion 3 ====
- 30 – Ashville V.F.D. (2 sta.'s)
- 31 – Busti V.F.D.
- 32 – Celoron Hose Co. #1 (2 sta.'s)
- 33 – Clymer V.F.D.
- 34 – Frewsburg V.F.C. (2 sta.'s) (Cattaraugus Co.)
- 35 – Jamestown F.D. (3 sta.'s)
- 36 – Kiantone Independent Fire Co. (2 sta.'s)
- 37 – Lakewood V.F.C.
- 38 – Panama V.F.C. (2 sta.'s)
- 63 – Sugar Grove V.F.D. (2 sta.'s) (Warren Co., PA)
- Alstar E.M.S. (Jamestown, NY)
- CCEMS Flycar Medic 73 (Lakewood, NY)
- CCEMS Ambulance 71 (Celoron, NY)

==== Battalion 4 ====
- 40 – Falconer V.F.D.
- 41 – Cherry Creek V.F.D.
- 42 – Ellery Center V.F.D.
- 43 – Ellington V.F.D.
- 44 – Bemus Point V.F.D. Inc.
- 45 – Fluvanna Fire Dist. (2 sta.'s)
- 46 – Gerry V.F.D.
- 47 – Kennedy V.F.D. #1
- 48 – Maple Springs V.F.C. Inc.
- 49 – Sinclairville V.F.C. #1
- 74-CCEMS Flycar Medic 74 (Falconer, NY)

=== Chemung County ===
- 01 – Elmira Corning Regional Airport F.D.
- 02 – Baldwin V.F.D. (2 sta.'s)
- 03 – Big Flats V.F.C.
- 04 – Breesport V.F.D.
- 05 – Chemung V.F.C.
- 06 – Elmira City F.D. (3 sta.'s) (Career Dept.)
- 07 – Elmira Heights V.F.D.
- 08 – Erin V.F.C.
- 09 – Golden Glow V.F.C. (2 sta.'s)
- 10 – Horseheads V.F.D.
- 11 – Millport V.F.C. Inc.
- 12 – Pine City V.F.D.
- 13 – Elmira Correctional Facility F.D.
- 14 – Southport V.F.D.
- 15 – Tompkins Corners V.F.C.
- 16 – Town and Country V.F.D.
- 17 – Van Etten V.F.D. (disbanded)
- 18 – Webbs Mills V.F.D. (2 sta.'s)
- 19 – Wellsburg V.F.D.
- 20 – West Hill V.F.D. (disbanded)
- 22 – East Hill V.F.D. Inc.
- 23 – West Elmira V.F.D.
- 24 – Community Fire & Rescue
- Erway Ambulance Service (3 sta.'s)

=== Chenango County ===
- 11 – Afton Hose Co.
- 12 – Bainbridge V.F.D.
- 13 – Borden Hose Co. #1 (2 sta.'s)
- 14 – Brisben V.F.D.
- 15 – Earlville V.F.C. (2 sta.'s – Madison Co.)
- 16 – Coventry V.F.C. Inc.
- 17 – Preston V.F.D.
- 18 – Genegantslet V.F.C. Inc.
- 19 – Guilford V.F.D.
- 21 – Greene V.F.D.
- 22 – McDonough V.F.D.
- 23 – Norwich F.D. & Amb.
- 24 – North Norwich V.F.D.
- 25 – New Berlin V.F.D. & Amb.
- 26 – Oxford V.F.D.
- 27 – Plymouth V.F.D. & Emer. Squad
- 28 – Sherburne V.F.D.
- 29 – Smyrna V.F.D.
- 31 – South New Berlin V.F.D. & Rescue Squad
- 32 – South Otselic V.F.D. & Amb.
- 33 – Pharsalia V.F.C.
- 36 – Greene Emer. Squad
- Cooperstown Medical Transport (Norwich, NY)

=== Clinton County ===
- 09 – E.M.T. of C.V.P.H. Ambulance (Plattsburgh, NY)
- 10 – Altona V.F.D.
- 11 – Au Sable Forks V.F.D. (Essex Co.)
- 12 – Beekmantown V.F.D. (2 sta.'s)
- 13 – Cadyville V.F.D.
- 14 – Niagara Hose Co. #1 (Champlain, NY)
- 15 – Chazy V.F.D.
- 16 – Churubusco V.F.D.
- 17 – Clinton Correctional Facility F.D. (Dannemora, NY)
- 18 – Cumberland Head V.F.D.
- 19 – Dannemora V.F.D. (aka Walter N. Thayer Hose Co.)
- 20 – Ellenburg Center V.F.D.
- 21 – Ellenburg Depot V.F.D.
- 22 – Hemmingford Fire Service (Hemmingford, QC)
- 23 – Keeseville V.F.D.
- 24 – Lyon Mountain V.F.C. Inc.
- 25 – Mooers V.F.D. (2 sta.'s)
- 26 – Morrisonville V.F.D.
- 27 – Peru V.F.D.
- 28 – Plattsburgh F.D. (2 sta.'s)
- 29 – Rescue Hose Co. #5 ***(disbanded)***
- 30 – Rouses Point V.F.D.
- 31 – Saranac V.F.D. (2 sta.'s)
- 32 – South Plattsburgh V.F.D. (2 sta.'s)
- 33 – West Chazy V.F.D.
- 34 – Plattsburgh International Airport F.D. (formally Plattsburgh Air Force Base F.D.)
- 35 – Town of Plattsburgh District #3 V.F.D. (2 sta.'s)
- 36 – Alburgh V.F.D. (Grand Isle Co., VT)
- 37 – Isle LaMotte V.F.D. (Grand Isle Co., VT)
- 38 – LaColle V.F.D. (LaColle, QC)
- 39 – St. Paul V.F.D. (St. Paul De L'lle-Aux-Noix, QC)
- 40 – Morrisonville Schuyler Falls Vol. Amb. Service
- 41 – Au Sable Forks Vol. Amb. Service (Essex Co.)
- 42 – St. Bernard V.F.D. (St. Bernard de LaColle, QC)
- 43 – Clinton Co. Office of Emergency Services (Plattsburgh, NY)
- 46 – Champlain-Mooers E.M.S.
- 49 – Town of Clinton Ambulance
- LaMoille Ambulance Service
- Varin's Ambulance Service (2 sta.'s)

=== Columbia County ===
- 02 – Chatham Rescue/Squad (2 sta.'s)
- 03 – Community Rescue/Squad (Copake)
- 04 – Greenport Rescue/Squad
- 06 – Philmont Rescue/Squad (disbanded)
- 08 – Valatie Rescue/Squad
- 11 – Columbia County 9-1-1
- 12 – A.B. Shaw Fire Co. #1 (Claverack)
- 14 – Copake Fire Co. #1
- 19 – Elizaville Pumper Co. #2
- 22 – Ghent V.F.C. #1
- 24 – Greenport V.F.D. – Pumper Co. #3
- 25 – Greenport V.F.D. – Pumper Co. #1
- 26 – Greenport V.F.D. – Becraft Pumper Co. #2
- 27 – Hudson F.D. – J.W. Edmonds Hose Co. #1
- 28 – Hudson F.D. – H.W. Rogers Hose Co. #2
- 29 – Lebanon Valley Protective Assn. Inc. – West Lebanon Sta.
- 30 – Hudson F.D. – J.W. Hoysradt Hose & Chemical Co. #8
- 31 – Hudson F.D. – Phoenix Hose Co. #5 (disbanded)
- 32 – Hudson F.D. – C.H. Evans Hook & Ladder #3
- 33 – Hillsdale Fire Co. #1
- 34 – Canaan Protective Fire Co. Inc.
- 35 – Palmer Engine & Hose Co. (Kinderhook)
- 40 – Mellenville V.F.C. #1
- 43 – North Chatham V.F.D.
- 45 – Niverville V.F.D. (2 sta.'s)
- 47 – Philmont V.F.C. #1
- 49 – Stockport V.F.C. #1
- 50 – Stottville V.F.C. #2
- 51 – Spencertown V.F.C.
- 52 – Stuyvesant V.F.C. #1
- 55 – Valatie V.F.D.
- 56 – Taghkanic V.F.C. #1 (2 sta.'s)
- 57 – West Ghent V.F.C.
- 58 – Chatham V.F.D.
- 60 – Clermont V.F.D. (2 sta.'s)
- 63 – Linlithgo Pumper Co. #3 (disbanded)
- 64 – Hudson F.D. – Washington Hose Co. #3 (disbanded)
- 65 – Stuyvesant Falls V.F.C. #2
- 70 – Germantown Hose Co. #1
- 75 – East Chatham V.F.C. Inc.
- 76 – Red Rock V.F.C.
- 79 – Ancram V.F.C.
- 80 – Austerlitz V.F.C.
- 81 – Lebanon Valley Protective Assn. Inc. – New Lebanon Sta.
- 83 – Livingston Pumper Co. #1
- 84 – Northern Dutchess Paramedics (NDP) (Livingston)
- 85 – Tri Village V.F.C. (2 sta.'s)
- 86 – Craryville V.F.C. #1
- 90 – Churchtown Fire Co. #1

=== Cortland County ===
- 01 – Cincinnatus V.F.D. & Ambulance (separate sta.'s)
- 02 – Cortland City F.D. (2 sta.'s)
- 03 – Cuyler V.F.D. (2 sta.'s)
- 04 – Harford V.F.D.
- 05 – Homer V.F.D.
- 06 – Marathon V.F.D. & Marathon Area Volunteer Amb. Corps (separate sta.'s)
- 07 – McGraw V.F.D.
- 08 – Preble V.F.D.
- 09 – Truxton V.F.D.
- 10 – Virgil V.F.D.
- 11 – Willet V.F.D.
- 12 – Cortland Co. Fire Control
- 13 – Cortlandville V.F.D. (2 sta.'s)
- TLC Ambulance (Cortland, NY)

=== Delaware County ===
- 01 – Andes V.F.D.
- 02 – Arena V.F.D.
- 03 – Arkville V.F.D.
- 04 – Bloomville V.F.D. (2 sta.'s)
- 05 – Bovina Center V.F.D.
- 06 – Cooks Falls-Horton V.F.C.
- 07 – Davenport V.F.D.
- 08 – Delhi V.F.D. (2 sta.'s)
- 09 – Deposit V.F.D.
- 10 – Downsville V.F.D.
- 11 – East Branch V.F.D.
- 12 – East Meredith V.F.D.
- 13 – Fleischmanns V.F.D.
- 14 – Franklin V.F.D.
- 15 – Grand Gorge Hose Co. #1 & Rescue/Squad
- 16 – Halcottsville V.F.D. Inc. (aka Wawaka Hose #1)
- 17 – Hancock V.F.D. & Rescue/Squad
- 18 – Hobart V.F.D. & Emergency Squad
- 19 – Margaretville V.F.D. & Amb.
- 20 – Masonville V.F.D.
- 21 – Meridale V.F.D.
- 22 – Pindars Corners V.F.D.
- 23 – Roxbury V.F.C. Inc.
- 24 – Sidney V.F.D. & Emergency Squad (2 sta.'s)
- 25 – Sidney Center V.F.D. & Emergency Squad
- 26 – South Kortright V.F.D.
- 27 – Stamford V.F.D.
- 28 – Treadwell V.F.D.
- 29 – Trout Creek V.F.C. Inc.
- 30 – Walton V.F.D.
- Cooperstown Medical Transport (C.M.T.) ***(soon to be American Medical Response (A.M.R.))***
- Hatzoloh Fleischmanns Ambulance
- Margaretville Memorial Hospital Ambulance

=== Dutchess County ===
- 14 – Dutchess Co. Emergency Response (Hyde Park)
- 31 – Amenia Fire Co. #1 Inc.
- 32 – Arlington F.D. (4 sta.'s)
- 33 – City of Beacon F.D. (3 sta.'s)
- 34 – Beekman V.F.C.
- 35 – Chelsea V.F.C.
- 36 – John H. Ketcham Hose Co. Inc. (Dover Plains – 2 sta.'s)
- 37 – Dutchess Junction V.F.D.
- 38 – East Clinton V.F.D.
- 39 – East Fishkill V.F.D. (7 sta.'s)
- 40 – none
- 41 – Fairview F.D.
- 42 – Fishkill V.F.D.
- 43 – Glenham V.F.D.
- 44 – Hillside V.F.D.
- 45 – Hughsonville F.D.
- 46 – Hyde Park V.F.D.
- 47 – LaGrange F.D. (3 sta.'s)
- 48 – Milan V.F.D. (3 sta.'s)
- 49 – Millbrook V.F.D.
- 50 – none
- 51 – Millerton V.F.D.
- 52 – New Hackensack V.F.D.
- 53 – New Hamburg V.F.D. (2 sta.'s)
- 54 – Pawling F.D. (3 sta.'s)
- 55 – Pine Plains V.F.D.
- 56 – Pleasant Valley V.F.D. (2 sta.'s)
- 57 – Poughkeepsie F.D. (3 sta.'s)
- 58 – Red Hook V.F.C. Inc.
- 59 – Rhinebeck V.F.D.
- 60 – none
- 61 – Rhinecliff V.F.C.
- 62 – Rombout V.F.C. (2 sta.'s)
- 63 – Roosevelt V.F.D. (3 sta.'s)
- 64 – Staatsburg V.F.D. (2 sta.'s)
- 65 – Stanford V.F.D.
- 66 – Tivoli V.F.C. #5
- 67 – Union Vale V.F.D. (2 sta.'s)
- 68 – Wappingers Falls V.F.D. (2 sta.'s)
- 69 – Wassaic V.F.C. Inc.
- 70 – none
- 71 – West Clinton V.F.D. (2 sta.'s)
- 72–80 – none
- 81 – EMStar (Poughkeepsie)
- 82 – Beacon V.A.C. Inc.
- 83 – Mobile Life Support Services (Wappingers Falls)
- 84 – Northern Dutchess Paramedics (N.D.P.) (6 sta.'s)
- 85 – EMStar (Wappingers Falls)
- 86 – Mobile Life Support Services Inc. (6 sta.'s)
- 87 – Mobile Life Support Services Inc. (Fishkill)
- 88–90 – none
- 91 – F.D.V.A. Castle Point
- 92 – Dutchess Co. Airport Fire/Rescue
- 93 – Green Haven Correctional Facility F.D.
- 94 – Fishkill Correctional Facility F.D. ***(now closed)***
- 95 – Hudson River Psychiatric Center F.D. ***(now closed)***
- 96 – I.B.M. East Fishkill Emergency Control
- 97 – I.B.M. Poughkeepsie Emergency Control
- 98 – Mattawan Correctional Facility F.D. ***(now closed)***
- 99 – Wassaic Developmental Center F.D. ***(now closed)***

=== Erie County ===
- Buffalo Fire Department
- Buffalo Niagara International Airport
- Town of Alden Fire Dist.
  - Alden V.F.C. Inc. (2 sta.'s)
  - Crittenden V.F.D.
  - Millgrove V.F.D. Inc.
- Town of Amherst Fire Dist.
  - East Amherst V.F.D. Inc. (2 sta.'s)
  - Eggertsville Hose Co.
  - Ellicott Creek V.F.C. Inc. (2 sta.'s)
  - Getzville V.F.C. Inc. (2 sta.'s)
  - Main Transit V.F.C. Inc. (2 sta.'s)
  - North Amherst V.F.C. Inc.
  - North Bailey V.F.C. Inc.
  - Snyder V.F.D.
  - Swormville V.F.C. Inc.
  - Williamsville V.F.D. (2 sta.'s)
- Town of Aurora Fire Dist.
  - East Aurora V.F.D.
  - West Falls V.F.C.
- Town of Boston Fire Dist.
  - Boston V.F.C. (2 sta.'s)
  - Boston Emergency Squad
  - North Boston V.F.C. Inc.
  - Patchin V.F.C. (2 sta.'s)
- Town of Brant Fire Dist.
  - Brant V.F.C. #1 Inc.
  - Farnham V.F.D.
- Cattaraugus Indian Reservation Fire Dist.
  - Cattaraugus Indian Reservation V.F.D.
- Town of Cheektowaga Fire Dist.
  - 1
    - Doyle Hose Co. #1
    - Doyle Hose Co. #2
  - 2 – Rescue Hose Co. #1
  - 3 – Forks Hose Co. #2 (2 sta.'s)
  - 4 – U-Crest V.F.C. #4
  - 5 – Pine Hill Hose Co. #5
  - 6 – Cleveland Hill Hose Co. #6
  - 7 – Sloan Active Hose Co. #1
  - 8 – Hy-View Hose Co. #8
  - 9 – Bellevue V.F.C. #9
  - 10 – South Line V.F.C. #10 (2 sta.'s)
- Town of Clarence Fire Dist.
  - Clarence V.F.C. #1
  - Clarence Center V.F.C.
  - Harris Hill V.F.C.
- Town of Colden Fire Dist.
  - Colden V.F.C. Inc. (2 sta.'s)
- Town of Collins Fire Dist.
  - Collins V.F.C.
  - Collins Center V.F.D. Inc.
  - Gowanda V.F.C. Inc. (2 sta.'s)
  - Gowanda Ambulance Service
- Town of Concord Fire Dist.
  - East Concord V.F.D. Inc.
  - Mortons Corners V.F.D.
  - Springville V.F.C. Inc. (2 sta.'s)
- Town of Eden Fire Dist.
  - East Eden V.F.C.
  - Eden V.F.D. #1
  - Eden Emergency Rescue/Squad
- Town of Elma Fire Dist.
  - Blossom V.F.C.
  - Elma V.F.C. Inc. (2 sta.'s)
  - Jamison Road V.F.C. Inc.
  - Spring Brook V.F.C. Inc.
- Town of Evans Fire Dist.
  - Angola V.F.D. (2 sta.'s)
  - Evans Center V.F.C. (2 sta.'s)
  - Highland Hose V.F.C. Inc.
  - Lake Erie Beach V.F.C. Inc.
  - North Evans V.F.C.
- Town of Grand Island Fire Dist.
  - Grand Island V.F.C. Inc.
- Town of Hamburg Fire Dist.
  - Armor V.F.C. Inc.
  - Big Tree V.F.C. Inc. (2 sta.'s)
  - Blasdell V.F.D.
  - Hamburg V.F.D.
  - Lake Shore V.F.C. Inc. (2 sta.'s)
  - Lake View V.F.C. (2 sta.'s)
  - Newton Abbott V.F.C. (2 sta.'s)
  - Scranton V.F.C. Inc. (2 sta.'s)
  - SouthTowns Haz-Mat Team
  - Woodlawn V.F.C. Inc.
- Town of Holland Fire Dist.
  - Holland V.F.D. (2 sta.'s)
- City of Lackawanna Fire Dist.
  - Lackawanna F.D. (3 sta.'s)
- Town of Lancaster Fire Dist.
  - Bowmansville V.F.C. (2 sta.'s)
  - Lancaster V.F.D. (2 sta.'s)
  - Lancaster Volunteer Ambulance Corps (L.V.A.C.) (2 sta.'s)
  - Town Line V.F.D. Inc. (2 sta.'s)
  - Twin District V.F.C.
- Town of Marilla Fire Dist.
  - Marilla V.F.C. Inc.
- Town of Newstead Fire Dist.
  - Akron V.F.C. Inc. (2 sta.'s)
  - Newstead V.F.C. Inc. (2 sta.'s)
- Town of North Collins Fire Dist.
  - Langford New Oregon V.F.C.
  - Lawtons V.F.C. Inc.
  - North Collins V.F.C. Inc.
  - North Collins Emergency Squad Inc.
- Town of Orchard Park Fire Dist.
  - Hillcrest V.F.C.
  - Orchard Park V.F.C. (2 sta.'s)
  - Windom V.F.C.
- Town of Sardinia Fire Dist.
  - Chaffee Sardinia V.F.C. Inc. (3 sta.'s)
- City of Tonawanda Fire Dist.
  - Tonawanda F.D. (2 sta.'s)
- Town of Tonawanda Fire Dist.
  - 1 – Ellwood V.F.C. #1
  - 2 – Kenilworth V.F.C. #1
  - 3 – River Road V.F.C. Inc. #3
  - 4 – Sheridan Park V.F.C. #4 (2 sta.'s)
  - 5 – Brighton V.F.C. #5 (3 sta.'s)
  - Kenmore V.F.D.
- Town of Wales Fire Dist.
  - 1 – South Wales V.F.C. #1
  - 2 – Wales Center V.F.C.
- Town of West Seneca Fire Dist.
  - 1 – Winchester V.F.C. #1
  - 2 – Union V.F.C. #2
  - 3 – Reserve Hose Fire Co. (2 sta.'s)
  - 4 – East Seneca V.F.C. #4
  - 5 – Seneca Hose Co. #1
  - 6 – Vigilant V.F.C. #1

=== Essex County ===
- 11 – Au Sable Forks V.F.D.
- 13 – Chilson V.F.D.
- 14 – Crown Point V.F.D. (2 sta.'s)
- 15 – Elizabethtown V.F.D.
- 16 – Essex V.F.D.
- 17 – Jay V.F.D.
- 18 – Keene V.F.D.
- 19 – Keene Valley Hose & Ladder Co. #1
- 20 – Bloomingdale V.F.C.
- 21 – Lewis V.F.C.
- 22 – Lake Placid V.F.D.
- 23 – Keeseville V.F.D. (Clinton Co.)
- 24 – Mineville Witherbee V.F.D.
- 25 – Moriah V.F.D.
- 26 – Newcomb V.F.C.
- 27 – North Hudson V.F.C.
- 28 – Newcomb Rescue Squad
- 29 – Port Henry V.F.D.
- 32 – Schroon Lake V.F.D.
- 33 – Ticonderoga V.F.C. #1
- 34 – Upper Jay V.F.D.
- 35 – Westport Hose Co. #1
- 36 – Wadhams V.F.C. Inc.
- 37 – Whallonsburg V.F.D. Inc.
- 38 – Willsboro Reber V.F.D. (2 sta.'s)
- 39 – Wilmington V.F.D.
- 41 – Au Sable Forks Vol. Amb. Service
- 42 – Elizabethtown Lewis Emergency Squad
- 43 – Moriah Ambulance Squad Inc.
- 44 – Ticonderoga Emergency Squad
- 45 - Lamoille Ambulance Service (Crown Point)
- 46 – Lake Placid Vol. Amb. Service (L.P.V.A.S.)
- 48 – Willsboro-Essex E.M.S.
- 49 – County of Essex EMS
- HealthNet 5 - Elizabethtown Community Hospital Transport Ambulance

=== Franklin County ===
- 10 – Bangor Vol. Fire & E.M.S.
- 20 – Bombay V.F.D.
- 30 – Brushton V.F.D.
- 40 – Burke V.F.D.
- 50 – Chateaugay V.F.D.
- 60 – Constable V.F.D. (2 sta.'s)
- 70 – Dickinson V.F.D.
- 80 – Ft. Covington V.F.D. & E.M.S.
- 90 – Hogansburg Akwesasne V.F.D. (3 sta.'s)
- 100 – Malone CallFiremen
- 120 – Moira Vol. Fire & Rescue Dept.
- 130 – Owls Head Mountain View V.F.D. (2 sta.'s)
- 140 – Saranac Lake V.F.D.
- 150 – St. Regis Falls V.F.D.
- 160 – Tupper Lake V.F.D.
- 170 – Westville V.F.D.
- 180 – Duane V.F.D.
- 200 – Bloomingdale V.F.D
- Akwesasne Mohawk Council Ambulance
- Northern Ambulance (Malone, NY)
- Saranac Lake Vol. Rescue/Squad
- Tupper Lake Vol. Amb. & Emer. Squad Inc.

=== Fulton County ===
- 01 – Berkshire V.F.D. (2 sta.'s)
- 02 – Broadalbin Kennyetto V.F.C.
- 03 – Caroga Lake V.F.C. Inc.
- 04 – Ephratah V.F.D.
- 05 – Gloversville F.D.
- 06 – Hilltop V.F.C.
- 07 – Johnstown F.D.
- 08 – Mayfield V.F.D.
- 09 – Meco V.F.C.
- 10 – Northville V.F.D.
- 11 – Oppenheim V.F.C. Inc. #1
- 12 – Perth V.F.C. Inc.
- 13 – Pleasant Square V.F.D.
- 14 – Rockwood Garoga Lassellsville V.F.C. Inc. (2 sta.'s)
- 15 – Sammonsville V.F.D.
- 16 – Sir William Johnson V.F.C.
- 17 – Stratford V.F.C. Inc.
- 18 – Fulton Co. Fire Coordinators
- 19 – none
- 20 – Fulton Co. E.M.S. Coordinators
- 21 – Ambulance Service of Fulton County Inc. (Gloversville)
- 22 – none
- 23 – none
- 24 – Stratford & Salisbury Volunteer Ambulance Service (S&S) (2 sta.'s, both in Herkimer Co.)
- 25 – Johnstown Area Volunteer Ambulance Corps (J.A.V.A.C.)
- 26 – none
- 27 – St. Johnsville Area Volunteer Ambulance Corps (S.A.V.A.C.) (Montgomery Co.)
- 28 – Town of Northampton Ambulance Service (Northville)
- 29 – Nathan Littauer Hospital (Gloversville)

=== Genesee County ===
==== Central Battalion ====
- 10 – Alexander V.F.D. Inc.
- 20 – City of Batavia F.D.
- 25 – Town of Batavia V.F.D. Inc. (2 sta.'s)
- 35 – Bethany V.F.C.
- 55 – Elba V.F.D.
- 75 – Oakfield V.F.D.

==== Eastern Battalion ====
- 30 – Bergen V.F.D. & Amb.
- 40 – Byron V.F.D. & Rescue/Squad
- 70 –
  - LeRoy V.F.D.
  - LeRoy V.A.S. Inc.
- 80 – Pavilion V.F.D.
- 90 – South Byron V.F.C. Inc.
- 95 – Stafford V.F.D.

==== Western Battalion ====
- 45 – Corfu V.F.D.
- 50 – Darien V.F.C. & E.M.S.
- 51 – Alabama V.F.C. Inc. (2 sta.'s)
- 56 – East Pembroke V.F.D.
- 85 –
  - Indian Falls V.F.D.
  - Pembroke V.F.C. Inc.

=== Greene County ===
- 01 – Ashland V.F.D.
- 02 – Athens V.F.D.
- 03 – Catskill V.F.C. #3
- 04 – Cairo Hose Co.
- 05 – Coxsackie Hose Co. (2 sta.'s)
- 06 – H.D. Lane V.F.C. Inc. (Lanesville)
- 07 – Earlton V.F.D.
- 08 – East Durham V.F.C. Inc. (2 sta.'s)
- 09 – East Jewett V.F.D.
- 10 – Freehold V.F.C.
- 11 – Greenville V.F.C. (2 sta.'s)
- 12 – Haines Falls V.F.C. Inc.
- 13 – Hensonville Hose Co. (2 sta.'s)
- 14 – Hunter V.F.C. #1
- 15 – Jewett V.F.D.
- 16 – Kiskatom V.F.D.
- 17 – Leeds Hose Co. #1
- 18 –
  - Lexington V.F.D. (2 sta.'s)
  - Town of Lexington Ambulance
- 19 – Medway Grapeville V.F.C. Inc.
- 20 – New Baltimore Fire Dist. #1 (2 sta.'s)
- 21 – Oak Hill Durham V.F.C. Inc.
- 22 – Palenville V.F.D.
- 23 – Prattsville Hose Co.
- 24 – Round Top V.F.C. Inc.
- 25 – Tannersville Joint Fire District (2 sta.'s)
- 26 – Windham Hose Co. #1
- 27 – West Athens Limestreet V.F.C. Inc. (2 sta.'s)
- 28–49 – none
- 50 – Coeymans Hollow Fire Dist. #6 (Albany Co.)
- 51 – Tri Village Fire Dist. #33 (Albany Co.)
- 52 – none
- 53 – Coeymans Fire Dist. #5 (Albany Co.)
- 54 – Medusa Fire Dist. #18 (Albany Co.)
- 55 – Saxton V.F.C. (Ulster Co.)
- 56 – Ravena Hose Co. #8 (Albany Co.)
- 57 – Grand Gorge Hose Co. #1 & Rescue/Squad (Delaware Co.)
- 58 – Westerlo Fire Dist. #39 (3 sta.'s) (Albany Co.)
- 59-60 – none
- 61 –
  - Coxsackie Correctional Facility
  - Greene Correctional Facility
- 62 – N.Y.S. Forest Rangers
- 63-65 – none
- 66 – Greene Co. Fire Investigation Team
- 67 – Greene Co. Haz/Mat Team
- 68 – Greene Co. Emergency Communications
- 69 – Twin Cloves Technical Rescue Team (Rope Rescue)
- 70 – none
- 71 – Town of Ashland Ambulance
- 72 – none
- 73 – Town of Catskill Ambulance Service
- 74 – Town of Cairo Ambulance
- 75 – Town of Coxsackie E.M.S.
- 76-80 – none
- 81 – Town of Greenville Rescue/Squad
- 82-83 – none
- 84 – Town of Hunter Area Ambulance
- 85-90 – none
- 91 – Town of Durham V.A.S. Inc.
- 92-95 – none
- 96 – Town of Windham Ambulance
- 97 – Nnoneone
- 98 – Greene Co. Paramedics (4 sta.'s)

=== Hamilton County ===
- Blue Mountain Lake V.F.D. (aka Indian Lake Fire Dist. #2)
- Hope V.F.D.
- Indian Lake V.F.C. (aka Indian Lake Fire Dist. #1)
- Indian Lake Volunteer Ambulance Corps
- Inlet Volunteer Emergency Services Inc. (I.V.E.S.)
- Lake Pleasant V.F.D.
- Long Lake V.F.D.
- Long Lake Rescue/Squad
- Morehouse V.F.D.
- Piseco V.F.D. Inc.
- Piseco Volunteer Ambulance Corps
- Raquette Lake V.F.D.
- Speculator V.F.D.
- Speculator Volunteer Ambulance Corps
- Wells V.F.D.
- Wells Volunteer Ambulance Corps

=== Herkimer County ===
- Beaver Flow V.F.D. (private F.D.)
- Big Moose V.F.D. (Town of Webb Fire Dist. #1)
- Cedarville V.F.D. (aka Joseph Berberich Hose Co. Inc.)
- Dolgeville V.F.D.
- Eagle Bay Vol. Hose Co. (Town of Webb Fire Dist. #1)
- East Herkimer V.F.D. (2 sta.'s)
- Frankfort V.F.D.
- Frankfort Center V.F.D.
- Frankfort Hill V.F.C.
- Gray V.F.C. (disbanded as of 2003)
- Herkimer F.D.
- Ilion F.D.
- Little Falls F.D.
- Middleville V.F.D. (aka E.W. Corey Hose Co.)
- Mohawk V.F.D. (aka German Flatts Fire Dist.)
- Newport V.F.C. #4
- Old Forge V.F.D. (Town of Webb Fire Dist. #1)
- Poland V.F.C. (2 sta.'s)
- Salisbury V.F.D. (2 sta.'s)
- Schuyler V.F.C. Inc. (2 sta.'s)
- Van Hornesville Fire Dist. #1 (2 sta.'s)
- West Winfield V.F.D. (aka Henry Hiteman Engine & Hose Co.)
- American Medical Response (A.M.R.) (Herkimer, NY)
- Kuyahoora Valley Ambulance Corps (K.V.A.C.) (Poland, NY)
- Mohawk Valley Volunteer Ambulance Corps (M.O.V.A.C.) (Mohawk, NY)
- Stratford & Salisbury Volunteer Ambulance Service (2 sta.'s)

=== Jefferson County ===
- 01 – Adams V.F.D.
- 02 – Adams Center V.F.D.
- 03 – Alexandria Bay V.F.D.
  - Alexandria Bay Ambulance
- 04 – Antwerp V.F.D.
- 05 – Belleville V.F.C. (2 sta.'s)
- 06 – Black River V.F.D.
- 07 – Town of Brownville Joint F.D. (3 sta.'s)
- 08 – Calcium V.F.D. (2 sta.'s)
- 09 – Fort Drum F.D. (3 sta.'s)
- 10 – Cape Vincent V.F.D.
- 11 – Carthage V.F.D.
- 12 –
  - Champion V.F.C. ***(now closed)***
- 13 – Chaumont V.F.D.
- 14 – Town of Clayton V.F.D.
- 15 – Deferiet V.F.C.
- 16 –
  - DePauville V.F.D. ***(merged with Clayton V.F.D., Town of Clayton V.F.D. created)***
- 17 –
  - Dexter V.F.D. (2 sta.'s) ***(merged with Brownville V.F.D., Town of Brownville Joint F.D. created)***
- 18 – none
- 19 – Ellisburg V.F.D.
- 20 – Evans Mills V.F.D.
- 21 – Felts Mills V.F.C.
- 22 – Fishers Landing V.F.D.
- 23 – Glen Park V.F.D.
- 24 – Great Bend V.F.D.
- 25 – Henderson V.F.D.
  - Henderson Ambulance
- 26 –
  - Herrings V.F.D. ***(now closed)***
- 27 – LaFargeville V.F.D. (2 sta.'s)
- 28 – Lorraine V.F.C.
- 29 – Mannsville Manor V.F.C. Inc.
- 30 – none
- 31 – Natural Bridge V.F.C.
- 32 – Northpole V.F.C. Inc.
- 33 – Oxbow V.F.D.
- 34 – Pamelia V.F.D.
- 35 – Philadelphia V.F.D.
- 36 – Plessis V.F.D.
- 37 – Redwood V.F.D.
- 38 – Rodman V.F.D.
- 39 – Rutland V.F.D. (2 sta.'s)
- 40 – Sackets Harbor V.F.C. (2 sta.'s)
  - Sackets Harbor Ambulance
- 41 – Smithville V.F.D.
- 42 – Theresa V.F.D. Inc.
- 43 – Thousand Island Emergency Rescue Services (T.I.E.R.S.)
- 44 – Three Mile Bay V.F.C. Inc.
- 45 – Tylerville V.F.C. (dept. disbanded & now Rutland V.F.D. Sta. #2)
- 46 – Town of Watertown V.F.D. (3 sta.'s)
- 47 – City of Watertown F.D. (3 sta.'s)
- 48 – Wellesley Island V.F.D. (2 sta.'s)
- 49 – West Carthage V.F.D.
- 50 – Worth V.F.D. ***(now closed)***
- 55 – Copenhagen V.F.D. (Lewis Co.)
- 56 – Special Tactics & Rescue Team (S.T.A.R.)
- 57 – Hazardous Materials Response Team
- 61 – Black River Ambulance Squad
- 62 – Cape Vincent Ambulance Squad
- 63 – Carthage Area Rescue Services (C.A.R.S.)
- 64 – Evans Mills Volunteer Ambulance Squad
- 65 – Fort Drum Ambulance
- 66 – Guilfoyle Ambulance Service (G.E.M.S.)
- 68 – Indian River Ambulance Service Inc.
- 69 – Natural Bridge Ambulance
- 71 – South Jefferson Rescue Squad Inc.
- 72 – Thousand Islands Emergency Rescue Service (T.I.E.R.S.)
- 74 – Town of Watertown Ambulance Service (T.W.A.S.) (2 sta.'s)
- Watertown International Airport F.D.

=== Lewis County ===
- 10 – Beaver Falls V.F.D.
- 12 – Castorland V.F.C.
- 14 – Copenhagen V.F.D. Inc.
- 16 – Croghan V.F.D.
- 18 – Harrisville V.F.D. Inc.
- 20 – 3G V.F.C. Inc. (aka Glenfield V.F.D.) (2 sta.'s)
- 22/24 – Lowville V.F.D.
- 26 – Martinsburg V.F.D.
- 28 – New Bremen V.F.C. Inc.
- 30 – Constableville V.F.C. Inc.
- 32 – Lyons Falls V.F.D.
- 34 – J.S. Koster Hose Co. Inc. (Port Leyden, NY)
- 36 – Turin V.F.C. Inc.
- 95 – West Leyden V.F.D.
- Lewis County Search & Rescue (ambulance service)

=== Livingston County ===
- 11 – Caledonia V.F.D.
- 12 – Genesee Valley E.M.S. (aka Caledonia Ambulance)
- 13 – Leicester V.F.D.
- 14 – none
- 15 – York E.M.S.
- 16 – Cuylerville V.F.D. & Amb.
- 17 – York V.F.D. Inc. (2 sta.'s)
- 18 – none
- 19 – none
- 20 – none
- 21 – Lakeville V.F.D.
- 22 – Avon V.F.D.
- 23 – Lima V.F.D.
- 24 – Avon Rotary Lions Ambulance
- 25 – Livonia V.F.D.
- 26 – Hemlock V.F.D.
- 27 – East Avon V.F.D. (2 sta.'s)
- 28 – Lima Volunteer Ambulance
- 29 – Livonia E.M.S.
- 30 – none
- 31 – Geneseo V.F.D.
- 32 – Groveland V.F.D.
- 33 – S.U.N.Y. Geneseo First Response
- 34 – Conesus V.F.D.
- 35–40 – None
- 41 – Mount Morris V.F.D.
- 42 – Nunda V.F.D. & Vol. Amb. Service
- 43 – Mount Morris E.M.S.
- 44–50 – none
- 51 – Dansville V.F.D.
- 52 – Dansville Ambulance Co.
- 53 – none
- 54 – Springwater V.F.D. Inc.
- 55 – Sparta Center V.F.C.
- 56 – Ossian V.F.D. (disbanded)
- 57 – none
- 58 – West Sparta V.F.D.
- 59 – none
- 60 – none
- 61 – none
- 62 – Livingston Co. Emergency Management & Fire Training Center

=== Madison County ===
- 07 – Bridgeport V.F.C. (2 sta.'s)
- 11 – Brookfield V.F.D.
- 12 – Canastota V.F.D.
- 13 – Cazenovia V.F.D.
- 14 – Tioughnioga V.F.D. (DeRuyter, NY)
- 15 – Earlville V.F.C. (2 sta.'s)
- 16 – Eaton Fire Dist. #1 (2 sta.'s)
- 17 – Erieville V.F.D.
- 18 – Georgetown V.F.D.
- 19 – Hamilton V.F.D.
- 20 – Hubbardsville V.F.D.
- 21 – Leonardsville V.F.D.
- 22 – Lincoln V.F.D. (2 sta.'s)
- 23 – Madison V.F.D.
- 24 – Morrisville V.F.D.
- 25 – Munnsville V.F.D.
- 26 – New Woodstock V.F.D.
- 27 – Madison Co. Fire Control
- 28 – North Brookfield V.F.D.
- 29 – Oneida City F.D.
- 31 – Smithfield V.F.D.
- 32 – Wampsville V.F.D.
- 33 – West Eaton V.F.D. (now part of the Eaton Fire Dist. #1)
- 34 – Poolville V.F.D. (dept. has disbanded and is now covered by Earlville V.F.C.)
- 41 – Greater Lenox Ambulance Service (G.L.A.S.)
- 51 – Southern Madison Co. Ambulance Corps (S.O.M.A.C.)
- 66 – North Chittenango V.F.C.
- 68 – Chittenango V.F.C.
- 71 – Smithfield Eaton Volunteer Ambulance Corps (S.E.V.A.C.)
- 81 – Cazenovia Area Volunteer Ambulance Corps (C.A.V.A.C.)
- American Medical Response (A.M.R.) (Town of Sullivan, NY)
- Smith Ambulance (DeRuyter, NY)
- Vineall Ambulance (Oneida, NY)

=== Monroe County ===
- Rochester City F.D. (17 sta.'s)

==== Battalion #1 ====
- 10 – North East Joint Fire District (Webster FD)
- 11 – Point Pleasant Fire District
- 12 – West Webster Fire District
- 13 – none
- 14 – none
- 15 – St. Paul Blvd Fire District
- 16 – none
- 17 – Irondequoit Fire District
- 18 – Irondequoit Ambulance
- 19 – Sea Breeze Fire District

==== Battalion #2 ====
- 20 – Lake Shore Fire District
- 21 – none
- 22 – Barnard Fire District
- 23 – Brockport Fire Department
  - Brockport Ambulance
- 24 – Hamlin-Morton-Walker Fire District
  - Hamlin Ambulance
- 25 – Ridge Road Fire District
- 26 – Hilton Parma Fire District
- 27 – North Greece Fire District
- 28 – none
- 29 – Spencerport Fire District

==== Battalion #3 ====
- 30 –
  - Brighton Fire District (3 stations)
  - Brighton Vol. Amb.
- 31 – Bushnell's Basin V.F.D. (2 sta.'s)
- 32 –
  - East Rochester V.F.D.
  - East Rochester V.A.C. (Disbanded. Services now provided by AMR of Rochester.)
- 33 –
  - Egypt V.F.D. (2 sta.'s)
  - Victor Farmington Vol. Amb. (2 sta.'s – Ontario Co.)
- 34 –
  - Fairport V.F.D. (2 sta.'s)
  - Perinton V.A.C.
- 35 – Fishers V.F.D. (2 sta.'s – Ontario Co.)
- 36 – Mendon V.F.D.
- 37 –
  - Penfield V.F.D. (3 sta.'s)
  - Penfield Webster Vol. Emer. Amb. (3 sta.'s)
- 38 –
  - Pittsford V.F.D. (2 sta.'s)
  - Pittsford Vol. Amb.
- 39 – none

==== Battalion #4 ====
- 40 – none
- 41 – none
- 42 –
  - Churchville V.F.D.
  - Bergen V.F.D. & Amb. (Genesee Co.)
- 43 –
  - Chili V.F.D. (4 sta.'s)
  - Chili V.A.S. **(member of CHS Mobile Integrated Healthcare)**
- 44 – Clifton V.F.D.
- 45 –
  - Gates V.F.D. (3 sta.'s)
  - Gates V.A.S. Inc.
- 46 – Scottsville V.F.D. & Rescue/Squad **(member of CHS Mobile Integrated Healthcare)**
- 47 –
  - Mumford V.F.D.
  - Caledonia V.F.D. (Livingston Co.)
  - Genesee Valley E.M.S. (aka Caledonia Amb. – Livingston Co.) ***(officially disbanded)*** **(services now provided by CHS Mobile Integrated Healthcare)**
- 48 – none
- 49 – none

==== Battalion #5 ====
- 50 – West Brighton V.F.D. (2 sta.'s) ***(disbanded)***
- 51 – none
- 52 – none
- 53 – none
- 54 – none
- 55 – none
- 56 –
  - Honeoye Falls V.F.D.
  - Honeoye Falls-Mendon Vol. Amb. Inc.
  - Lima V.F.D. (Livingston Co.)
  - Lima Vol. Amb. (Livingston Co.)
- 57 – none
- 58 –
  - Rush V.F.D. (2 sta.'s)
  - Avon V.F.D. (Livingston Co.)
  - Avon Rotary Lions Amb. (Livingston Co.)
- 59 – none
- 06 – Henrietta V.F.D. (6 sta.'s)
- 60 – none
- 61 – Henrietta V.A.S. Inc. **(now CHS Mobile Integrated Healthcare)**
- 62 – none
- 63 – Rochester Institute of Technology (R.I.T.) Amb.
- 64–69 – none

==== Battalion #7 ====
- 70 – Kodak F.D.
- 71 – Xerox F.D.
- 71-79 - AMR Rochester

=== Montgomery County ===
- American Medical Response (A.M.R.) (Nelliston)
- 32 – Greater Amsterdam Volunteer Ambulance Corps (G.A.V.A.C.)
- 33 – Mid County Volunteer Ambulance (disbanded)
- 34 – Fonda Fultonville Area Volunteer Ambulance (disbanded)
- 35 – St. Johnsville Volunteer Ambulance Corps Inc. (S.A.V.A.C.) (disbanded)
- 206 – Ames V.F.D.
- 207 – City of Amsterdam F.D.
- 208 – Burtonsville V.F.C. Inc.
- 209 – Canajoharie V.F.D.
- 210 – Charleston V.F.D.]
- 211 – Cranesville V.F.D.
- 212 – Fonda V.F.D. (dissolved by Mayor Bill Peeler and the Village Board effective March 14, 2013)
- 213 – Fort Hunter Engine & Hose Co. Inc.
- 214 – Fort Johnson V.F.C. (2 sta.'s)
- 215 – Fort Plain V.F.D.
- 216 – Fultonville V.F.D. (aka Aetna Engine Co. #1)
- 217 – Town of Glen V.F.D. Inc.
- 218 – Hagaman V.F.D.
- 219 – Rural Grove V.F.C.
- 220 – St. Johnsville V.F.D. (2 sta.'s)
- 221 – Town of Florida V.F.D. (2 sta.'s)
- 222 – Town of Mohawk V.F.D.
- 223 – Tribes Hill V.F.D. Inc.
- 224 – South Minden V.F.D.

=== Nassau County ===
==== 1st Battalion ====
- 100 – Bellerose Village V.F.D.
- 110 – Bellerose Terrace V.F.D.
- 120 – Floral Park V.F.D. (3 sta.'s)
- 130 – Floral Park Centre V.F.C. Inc. (Disbanded; District taken over by New Hyde Park Fire District)
- 140 – Garden City V.F.D. (3 sta.'s)
- 150 – Garden City Park V.F.D. (2 sta.'s)
- 160 – Mineola V.F.D. (3 sta.'s)
- 170 – New Hyde Park V.F.D. (4 sta.'s)
- 180 – South Floral Park V.F.D.
- 190 – Stewart Manor V.F.D.
- 260 – Mineola V.A.C.

==== 2nd Battalion ====
- 200 – Baldwin V.F.D. (4 sta.'s)
- 210 – Freeport V.F.D. (6 sta.'s)
- 220 – Island Park V.F.D.
- 230 – Long Beach V.F.D. (3 sta.'s)
- 240 – Oceanside V.F.D. (6 sta.'s)
- 250 – Pt. Lookout-Lido V.F.D. (3 sta.'s)
- 270 – Malverne V.A.C.
- 280 – Bellmore Merrick E.M.S. (2 sta.'s)
- 290 – Wantagh Levittown V.A.C.

==== 3rd Battalion ====
- 300 – Hewlett V.F.D.
- 310 – Inwood V.F.D.
- 320 – Lawrence Cedarhurst V.F.D.
- 330 – Meadowmere Park V.F.D.
- 340 – Valley Stream V.F.D. (5 sta.'s)
- 350 – Woodmere V.F.D.
- 360 – Atlantic Beach Rescue/Squad
- 370 – Glen Cove EMS

==== 4th Battalion ====
- 400 – East Rockaway V.F.D. (4 sta.'s)
- 410 – Lakeview V.F.D.
- 420 – Lynbrook V.F.D. (6 sta.'s)
- 430 – Malverne V.F.D.
- 440 – Rockville Centre V.F.D. (5 sta.'s)

==== 5th Battalion ====
- 500 – Bayville V.F.C. #1
- 510 – East Norwich V.F.C. #1
- 520 –
  - Glen Cove V.F.D.
  - Glen Cove Volunteer E.M.S.
- 530 – Glenwood Hook & Ladder, Engine & Hose Fire Co. (2 sta.'s)
- 540 – Locust Valley V.F.D.
- 550 –
  - Oyster Bay Fire Co. #1
  - Atlantic Steamer Fire Co. #1 (2 sta.'s)
- 560 – Roslyn Rescue Hook & Ladder Co. #1 (3 sta.'s)
- 570 – Sea Cliff Engine & Hose Co.
- 580 – Syosset V.F.D. (3 sta.'s)
- 590 – Roslyn Highlands Hook & Ladder, Engine & Hose Co. (2 sta.'s)

==== 6th Battalion ====
- 600 – Bellmore V.F.D. (3 sta.'s)
- 610 – East Meadow V.F.D. (5 sta.'s)
- 620 – Levittown V.F.D. (3 sta.'s)
- 630 – Massapequa V.F.D. (4 sta.'s)
- 640 – Merrick V.F.D. (3 sta.'s)
- 650 – North Bellmore V.F.D. (3 sta.'s)
- 660 – North Massapequa V.F.D. (2 sta.'s)
- 670 – North Merrick V.F.D.
- 680 – Seaford V.F.D.
- 690 – Wantagh Hook, Ladder & Engine Co. #1 (7 sta.'s)

==== 7th Battalion ====
- 700 – Elmont V.F.D. (8 sta.'s)
- 710 – Franklin Square & Munson V.F.D.
- 720 – Hempstead V.F.D. (6 sta.'s)
- 730 – Roosevelt V.F.D. (3 sta.'s)
- 740 – South Hempstead V.F.D.
- 750 – Uniondale V.F.D. (3 sta.'s)
- 760 – West Hempstead V.F.D.

==== 8th Battalion ====
- 800 – Albertson Hook & Ladder, Engine & Hose Co. #1 (2 sta.'s)
- 810 – East Williston V.F.D.
- 820 – Alert Engine, Hook, Ladder & Hose Co. #1 (2 sta.'s)
- 830 – Vigilant Engine & Hook & Ladder Co.
- 840 – Plandome V.F.D.
- 850 – Pt. Washington V.F.D. (5 sta.'s)
- 860 –
  - Williston Park V.F.D.
  - Williston Park Ambulance
- 870 – Manhasset-Lakeville V.F.D. (6 sta.'s)

==== 9th Battalion ====
- 900 – Bethpage V.F.D. (3 sta.'s)
- 910 – Carle Place Hook, Ladder & Hose Co. #1
- 920 – Farmingdale Hook, Ladder & Hose Co. #1/Water Witch Engine & Hose Co. #1
- 930 – Hicksville V.F.D. (4 sta.'s)
- 940 – Jericho V.F.D. (3 sta.'s)
- 950 – Plainview V.F.D. (3 sta.'s)
- 960 – Westbury V.F.D. (2 sta.'s)
- 970 – South Farmingdale V.F.D. (2 sta.'s)

==== Ambulance and other departments ====
- C.W. Post New York Tech Ambulance (Greenvale)
- First Response Ambulance (Inwood)
- Hatzalah of the Rockaways & Nassau Co. (Woodmere)
- Mitchell Field A.F.B. F.D. (Uniondale)
- North Shore Univ. Hosp. Ambulance (Syosset)
- U.S. Merchant Marine Academy E.M.S. (Kings Point)
- NYU Langone Hospitals EMS – Nassau Division (Garden City)
- Town of Hempstead EMS (Point Lookout) – Municipal ALS-FR

=== Niagara County ===
- 01 – Adams V.F.C. (2 sta.'s)
- 02 – Barker V.F.D. Inc.
- 03 – Bergholz V.F.C.
- 04 – Cambria V.F.C. Inc. (2 sta.'s)
- 05 – Frontier V.F.C. Inc. (2 sta.'s)
- 06 – Gasport Chemical Hose Co. Inc. (2 sta.'s)
- 07 – Lewiston V.F.C. #1 Inc. (2 v.'s)
- 08 – Lewiston V.F.C. #2 Inc.
- 09 – Lockport F.D.
- 10 – Middleport V.F.C. #1
- 11 – Miller Hose Fire Co.
- 12 – Town of Niagara Active Hose Co. Inc.
- 13 – none
- 14 – Niagara Falls F.D. (6 sta.'s)
- 15 – North Tonawanda F.D. (8 sta.'s)
- 16 – Olcott V.F.C.
- 17 – Pekin V.F.C. Inc.
- 18 – Ransomville V.F.C.
- 19 – Rapids V.F.C. Inc. (2 sta.'s)
- 20 – St. Johnsburg V.F.C. Inc.
- 21 – Sanborn V.F.C. Inc.
- 22 – Shawnee V.F.C. Inc. (2 sta.'s)
- 23 – South Lockport V.F.C. Inc. (2 sta.'s)
- 24 – South Wilson V.F.C. Inc.
- 25 – Terry's Corners V.F.C.
- 26 – Upper Mountain V.F.C.
- 27 – Wendelville V.F.C. Inc. (3 sta.'s)
- 28 – Wilson V.F.C. #1 (2 sta.'s)
- 29 – Wolcottsville V.F.C. Inc.
- 30 – Wrights Corners V.F.C. Inc. (3 sta.'s)
- 31 – Youngstown V.F.C. Inc.
- 32 – County Coordinators
- 33 – Hartland V.F.C. Inc.
- 34 – none
- 35 – none
- 36 – none
- 37 – Niagara Falls Air Reserve Station F.D.
- American Medical Response (A.M.R.-Niagara Falls)
- Mercy Flight E.M.S. (Town of Niagara and east side of the county)
- Tri-Community Ambulance Service Inc. (Sanborn)
- Tri-Town Ambulance Inc. (3 sta.'s)
- Twin City Ambulance (covers N.T. and has a station in City of Lockport; Erie Co. - 2 sta.'s)

=== Oneida County ===
- 10 – New Hartford V.F.D.
- 11 – New York Mills V.F.D.
- 12 – Yorkville Fire & Hose Co.
- 13 – Whitesboro V.F.D.
- 14 – Oriskany V.F.D.
- 15 – Maynard V.F.D. (2 sta.'s)
- 16 – Oneida County Airport F.D.
- 17 – Clark Mills V.F.D.
- 20 – Utica F.D. (6 sta.'s)
- 24 – Edwards Ambulance (Chadwicks, NY)
- 27 – Oneida County Fire Control
- 28 – Emergency Services Coordinators
- 30 – Willowvale Fire Co. Inc.
- 31 – Sauquoit Fire Dist. #1
- 32 – Paris Hill V.F.C.
- 33 – Clayville V.F.D.
- 34 – Cassville V.F.D.
- 35 – Bridgewater V.F.C.
- 36 – Henry Hiteman Engine & Hose Co. (West Winfield, NY – Herkimer Co.)
- 37 – Unadilla Forks V.F.C. (Otsego Co.)
- 40 – Clinton V.F.D. (2 sta.'s)
- 41 – Barton Hose Co. (Deansboro, NY)
- 42 – Waterville V.F.D.
- 43 – Oriskany Falls V.F.D. (2 sta.'s)
- 44 – Westmoreland V.F.D.
- 45 – Lairdsville V.F.D. (disbanded)
- 46 – Lowell V.F.D. (disbanded)
- 50 – Volunteer Fire Co. of Vernon Inc.
- 51 – Sherrill-Kenwood V.F.D.
- 52 – Oneida Castle V.F.D.
- 54 – Durhamville V.F.D.
- 55 – Verona V.F.D. (2 sta.'s)
- 56 – Vernon Center V.F.D.
- 60 – Rome F.D. (2 sta.'s)
- 62 – Stanwix Heights V.F.D.
- 63 – New London V.F.D.
- 64 – Town of Lee Fire Dist. (aka Lee Center V.F.D.)
- 65 – Volunteer Fire Co. of Western Inc.
- 66 – Lake Delta V.F.D.
- 67 – Portners V.F.C. (Lee Center, NY) (disbanded)
- 68 – Rome State School F.D. (disbanded)
- 69 – Vineall Ambulance (1 sta. in Oneida, NY (Madison Co.) & 1 at the Sylvan Beach V.F.D.)
- 70 – Sylvan Beach V.F.D.
- 71 – McConnellsville V.F.D.
- 72 – North Bay V.F.D.
- 73 – Taberg V.F.C.
- 74 – Camden V.F.D.
- 75 – Vienna V.F.D.
- 76 – Blossvale V.F.D. (disbanded)
- 77 – Cleveland V.F.D. (Oswego Co.)
- 78 – Florence V.F.D.
- 80 – Deerfield V.F.C. #1 (2 sta.'s)
- 81 – Floyd V.F.D.
- 82 – Stittville V.F.D.
- 83 – Holland Patent Hose Co.
- 84 – Barneveld V.F.D.
- 85 – Prospect V.F.C. Inc. (disbanded)
- 86 – Poland V.F.D. (2 sta.'s, both in Herkimer Co.)
- 90 – Remsen V.F.C. Inc.
- 91 – Boonville V.F.C. Inc. & Ambulance
- 92 – Forestport Fire Fighters Inc.
- 93 – Otter Lake V.F.D.
- 94 – Old Forge V.F.D. (Herkimer Co.)
- 95 – West Leyden V.F.D. (Lewis Co.)
- 97 – Woodgate V.F.D.
- AmCare Ambulance (Rome, NY)
- Central Oneida County Volunteer Ambulance Corps (C.O.C.V.A.C.) (headquarters is in Clark Mills, Sta. #2 is in Whitesboro, NY & Sta. #3 is in Waterville, NY)
- Kunkel Ambulance (Utica, NY)

=== Onondaga County ===
- 01 – Amber F.D.
- 02 – Apulia F.D.
- 03 – Baldwinsville F.D. (3 sta.'s)
- 04 – Belgium Cold Springs F.D. (2 sta.'s)
- 05 – Borodino F.D.
- 07 – Bridgeport F.D. (2 sta.'s, both in Madison Co.)
- 08 – Camillus F.D.
- 09 – Brewerton F.D. (2 sta.'s)
- 10 – Cicero F.D. (2 sta.'s)
- 11 – Clay F.D. (2 sta.'s)
- 13 – Delphi Falls F.D.
- 14 – DeWitt F.D. (2 sta.'s)
- 15 – East Syracuse F.D.
- 17 – Elbridge F.D.
- 18 – Fabius F.D.
- 19 – Fairmount F.D.
- 20 – Fayetteville F.D.
- 21 – Hinsdale F.D.
- 22 – Howlett Hill F.D.
- 23 – Jamesville F.D.
- 24 – Jordan F.D.
- 25 – Kirkville F.C.
- 26 – Lafayette F.D. (2 sta.'s)
- 27 – Lakeside F.D. (2 sta.'s)
- 28 – Liverpool F.D. (3 sta.'s)
- 30 – Lyncourt F.D.
- 31 – Lysander F.D. (2 sta.'s)
- 32 – Manlius F.D.
- 33 – Marcellus F.D.
- 35 – Mattydale F.D.
- 36 – Memphis F.D.
- 37 – Minoa F.D. (2 sta.'s)
- 38 – Mottville F.C.
- 39 – Moyers Corners F.D. (4 sta.'s)
- 41 – Navarino F.D.
- 42 – Nedrow F.D.
- 43 – North Syracuse F.D. (2 sta.'s)
- 44 – Onondaga Hill F.D.
- 45 – Onondaga Nation F.D.
- 46 – Otisco F.D.
- 47 – Enterprise Fire Co. #1 (Phoenix, NY) (3 sta.'s, 2 of which are in Oswego Co.)
- 48 – Plainville F.D.
- 51 – Pompey Hill F.D.
- 52 – Seneca River F.D.
- 53 – Sentinel Heights F.D.
- 54 – Skaneateles F.D. (3 sta.'s)
- 57 – Solvay F.D. (3 sta.'s)
- 58 – South Bay F.D.
- 59 – South Onondaga F.D.
- 60 – Southwood F.D.
- 61 – Spafford F.D.
- 62 – Taunton F.D. (2 sta.'s)
- 63 – Tully Hose Co. (2 sta.'s)
- 65 – Warners F.D.
- 66 – North Chittenango F.C. (Madison Co.)
- 68 – Chittenango F.D. (Madison Co.)
- 71 – Caughdenoy F.D. (2 sta.'s) (Oswego Co.)
- 72 – Cody F.D. (2 sta.'s) (Oswego Co.)
- 80 – East Area Volunteer Emergency Services (E.A.V.E.S.)
- 81 – Greater Baldwinsville Ambulance Corps (G.B.A.C.)
- 82 – North Area Volunteer Ambulance Corps (N.A.V.A.C.)
- 83 – Skaneateles Ambulance Volunteer Emergency Services (S.A.V.E.S.)
- 87 – Western Area Volunteer Emergency Services (W.A.V.E.S.)
- 88 – American Medical Response (A.M.R.)
- 89 – Northern Onondaga Volunteer Ambulance (N.O.V.A.)
- 98 – Syracuse Airport Aircraft Rescue Fire Fighting (A.R.F.F.)
- 99 – Syracuse F.D. (11 sta.'s)

=== Ontario County ===
- 01 – Bristol V.F.D. (2 sta.'s)
- 02 – Canandaigua F.D. (2 sta.'s)
- 03 – Canandaigua Veterans Administration Hospital F.D.
- 04 – Cheshire V.F.D. (2 sta.'s)
- 05 – Clifton Springs V.F.D.
- 06 – Crystal Beach V.F.D. Inc.
- 07 – East Bloomfield Holcomb V.F.D.
- 08 – Farmington Volunteer Fire Assn. (2 sta.'s)
- 09 – Fishers V.F.D. (2 sta.'s)
- 10 – none
- 11 – Geneva F.D. (2 sta.'s)
- 12 – Gorham V.F.D.
- 13 – Hall V.F.D.
- 14 – Richmond V.F.D.
- 15 – Hopewell V.F.D. Inc. (2 sta.'s)
- 16 – Ionia V.F.C.
- 17 – Manchester V.F.D.
- 18 – Maxfield Hose Co. Inc. (3 sta.'s)
- 19 – North Side V.F.C.
- 20 – none
- 21 – Phelps V.F.D.
- 22 – Port Gibson V.F.D. Inc.
- 23 – Rushville Hose Co.
- 24 – Seneca Castle V.F.C.
- 25 – Citizens Hose Co. (Shortsville, NY)
- 26 – Stanley V.F.D.
- 27 – Victor V.F.D.
- 28 – West Bloomfield V.F.D. Inc.
- 29 – West Lake Road Fire Assn. Inc.
- 30 – none
- 31 – White Springs Fire Assn.
- 32 – Oaks Corners V.F.C. Inc.
- 33 – Victor Farmington Volunteer Ambulance (2 sta.'s)
- 34 – Canandaigua Emergency Squad
- 35 – none
- 36 – Naples Ambulance Inc.
- 37 – Phelps Ambulance
- Finger Lakes Ambulance (2 sta.'s – Clifton Springs, NY)

=== Orange County ===
==== Battalion 1 ====
- 05 – Circleville V.F.D. (2 sta.'s)
- 15 – Otisville Mount Hope V.A.C.
- 21 – Howells V.F.C. #1
- 26 – Middletown V.F.D. (3 sta.'s)
- 27 – Mechanicstown V.F.D. (2 sta.'s)
- 34 – Otisville V.F.D.
- 37 – Pocatello Mount Hope V.F.C.
- 42 – Silver Lake V.F.C.
- 48 – Washington Heights V.F.C.

==== Battalion 2 ====
- 06 – Coldenham V.F.C.
- 24 – Maybrook Engine Co. #1
- 29 – Montgomery V.F.D.
- 35 – Pine Bush Hook & Ladder Co. #1
- 46 – Walden V.F.D. (2 sta.'s)
- 57 – Bullville V.F.C.

==== Battalion 3 ====
- 09 – Cronomer Valley V.F.D.
- 11 – Dan Leghorn Engine Co. #1 (Newburgh)
- 14 – Good Will V.F.D. Inc. (Newburgh)
- 25 – Middlehope V.F.D. (2 sta.'s)
- 31 – Newburgh F.D. (2 sta.'s)
- 50 – Winona Lake Engine Co. #2 (Newburgh)
- 54 – Stewart Air National Guard F.D.

==== Battalion 4 ====
- 07 – Cornwall V.F.D. (2 sta.'s)
- 08 – Storm King Engine Co. #2 (Cornwall-on-Hudson)
- 13 – Ft. Montgomery V.F.D.
- 19 – Highland Falls V.F.D.
- 33 – Quassaick Engine Co. (New Windsor)
- 45 – Vails Gate V.F.C. (2 sta.'s)
- 55 – West Point F.D. (3 sta.'s)

==== Battalion 5 ====
- 28 – Monroe Joint Fire Dist. (3 fire co.'s & 4 sta.'s)
- 39 – Salisbury Mills V.F.D. (2 sta.'s)
- 43 – Tuxedo Joint V.F.D. (3 sta.'s)
- 49 – Monell Engine Co. (Washingtonville)
- 51 – Woodbury V.F.D. (2 sta.'s)
- 58 – South Blooming Grove V.F.D.
- 59 – Kiryas Joel V.F.D.

==== Battalion 6 ====
- 01 – Pine Island V.F.D. (2 sta.'s)
- 12 – Highland Engine & Hook Co. #3 (Florida)
- 17 – Greenwood Lake F.D.
- 47 – Warwick F.D. (3 sta.'s)

==== Battalion 7 ====
- 15 – Mountain View V.F.D. (formerly Greenville Twp. V.F.D. Inc.)
- 22 – Rutgers Engine Co. #1 (aka Johnson V.F.D.)
- 32 – New Hampton V.F.C.
- 40 – Wawayanda V.F.C.
- 44 – Minisink Hose Co. #1 (Unionville)

==== Battalion 8 ====
- 10 – Cuddebackville Fire Dist. #1
- 38 – Port Jervis V.F.D. (5 sta.'s)
- 41 – Sparrowbush Engine Co. Inc. (2 sta.'s)
- 52 – Huguenot V.F.C. Inc.

==== Battalion 9 ====
- 02 – Otterkill Engine Co. #1 (Campbell Hall)
- 04 – Chester V.F.D. (3 sta.'s)
- 16 – Goshen V.F.D. (3 sta.'s)

=== Orleans County ===
==== East Battalion ====
- Clarendon V.F.C.
- F.H.M. (Fancher Hulberton Murray) V.F.C. (merged with Holley FD to form Murray Joint Fire District in 2021)
- Holley V.F.D. (merged with Fancher-Hulberton-Murray FD to form Murray Joint Fire District in 2021
- Kendall V.F.D.
- Morton V.F.C. Inc. (Monroe Co.)

==== Central Battalion ====
- Albion V.F.D. Inc.
- Barre V.F.C. Inc.
- Carlton V.F.C. (2 sta.'s)

==== West Battalion ====
- East Shelby V.F.C. Inc.
- Lyndonville V.F.C.
- Medina F.D.
- Ridgeway V.F.C. Inc. (2 sta.'s)
- Shelby V.F.C. Inc. (2 sta.'s)

==== Ambulance services ====
- C.O.V.A. (Central Orleans Vol. Amb.) (dissolved November 2022, taken over by Mercy EMS)

=== Oswego County ===
- 01 – Alcan Aluminum Fire Brigade (Novelis)
- 02 – Altmar V.F.D.
- 03 – Fulton F.D. (2 sta.'s)
- 04 – Cleveland V.F.D.
- 05 – Central Square Fire Co. #1
- 06 – Caughdenoy V.F.D. (2 sta.'s)
- 07 – Cody V.F.D. (2 sta.'s)
- 08 – Constantia Fire Dist. #1
- 09 – Brewerton V.F.D. (2 sta.'s) (Onondaga Co.)
- 10 – Granby Center V.F.D.
- 11 – Hastings V.F.D.
- 12 – Hannibal V.F.C.
- 13 – Lacona V.F.D.
- 14 – Mexico V.F.D.
- 15 – Minetto V.F.D.
- 16 – New Haven V.F.C.
- 17 – Orwell V.F.C.
- 18 – Oswego City F.D. (2 sta.'s)
- 19 – Palermo V.F.C.
- 20 – Parish V.F.C.
- 21 – Pennellville V.F.D.
- 23 – Ringgold Fire Co. #1 (Pulaski, NY)
- 24 – Redfield V.F.C.
- 25 – Richland V.F.D.
- 26 – Sandy Creek V.F.D.
- 27 – Scriba V.F.C.
- 28 – Volney V.F.C. (2 sta.'s)
- 29 – West Amboy V.F.D.
- 30 – Williamstown V.F.D.
- 33 – West Monroe V.F.D.
- 34 – Oswego Town V.F.D.
- 35 – North Bay V.F.D. (Oneida Co.)
- 36 – McConnellsville V.F.D. (Oneida Co.)
- 38 – Oswego Co. Fire Control
- 46 – Sunoco Ethanol Plant Fire Brigade
- 47 – Enterprise Fire Co. #1 (Phoenix, NY) (3 sta.'s, 1 of which is in Onondaga Co.)
- McFee Ambulance (Mexico, NY)
- Menter Ambulance (aka Oswego County Ambulance Service) (Fulton, NY)
- Northern Oswego County Ambulance (N.O.C.A.) (Pulaski, NY)
- Student Assoc. Volunteer Ambulance Corps (S.A.V.A.C.) (SUNY-Oswego, NY)

=== Otsego County ===
- 01 – Cherry Valley V.F.D.
- 02 – Cooperstown V.F.D.
- 03 – East Worcester Hose Co. #1
- 04 – Edmeston V.F.D.
- 05 – Fly Creek V.F.C.
- 06 – Garrattsville V.F.C. Inc.
- 07 – Gilbertsville V.F.D.
- 08 – Hartwick V.F.D. Co. #1
- 09 – Hartwick (Seminary) V.F.D. Co. #2
- 10 – Laurens V.F.D.
- 11 – Middlefield V.F.D.
- 12 – Milford V.F.D.
- 13 – Morris V.F.D.
- 14 – Mount Vision V.F.D.
- 15 – Otego V.F.D.
- 16 – Oneonta F.D.
- 17 – Richfield Springs V.F.D.
- 18 – Schenevus Maryland Fire Dist. (aka C.H. Graham Hose Co.)
- 19 – Schuyler Lake V.F.D.
- 20 – Springfield V.F.D. (2 Sta.'s)
- 21 – Unadilla V.F.D.
- 22 – Unadilla Forks V.F.C.
- 23 – Wells Bridge V.F.D.
- 24 – West Edmeston V.F.D. (2 Sta.'s)
- 25 – Westford V.F.D.
- 26 – West Laurens V.F.D.
- 27 – West Oneonta V.F.D. Inc.
- 28 – Worcester Fire Dist. & Emer. Squad
- 29 – West Exeter V.F.D.
- 30 – Pittsfield V.F.D.
- 70 – Oneonta State Emergency Squad
- Cooperstown Medical Transport (CMT Ambulance) ***(soon to be American Medical Response (A.M.R.))***

=== Putnam County ===
- 11 – Brewster V.F.D. (2 sta.'s)
- 12 – Carmel V.F.D.
- 13 – Cold Spring V.F.C. #1
- 14 – Continental Village V.F.D.
- 15 – Garrison V.F.C. Inc. (2 sta.'s)
- 16 – Kent V.F.D.
- 17 – Lake Carmel V.F.D. Inc.
- 18 – Mahopac V.F.D. (3 sta.'s)
- 19 – Mahopac Falls V.F.D. Inc. (2 sta.'s)
- 20 – Nelsonville V.F.D. ****(disbanded)****
- 21 – North Highlands Engine Co. #1
- 22 – Patterson V.F.D. #1 Inc. (2 sta.'s)
- 23 – Putnam Lake V.F.D. #2
- 24 – Putnam Valley V.F.D. (2 sta.'s)
- 25–30 – none
- 31 – Carmel V.A.C.
- 32 – Garrison V.A.C.
- 33 – Philipstown V.A.C.
- 34 – Putnam Valley V.A.C. Inc.
- 35 – Putnam Medics
- 36 – Town of Patterson Amb.

=== Rensselaer County ===
- 01 – Averill Park Sand Lake V.F.D.
- 02 – Berlin V.F.C. & Rescue/Squad
- 03 – Best Luther V.F.C. (2 sta.'s)
- 04 – Brunswick V.F.C. #1
- 05 – Buskirk V.F.D. Inc.
- 06 – Castleton V.F.C.
- 07 – V.F.C. of Center Brunswick Inc.
- 08 – Clinton Heights Fire Department (3 sta.'s)
- 09 – Defreestville V.F.D.
- 10 – Eagle Mills Fire Dist. #1
- 11 – East Greenbush V.F.C. Inc. (3 sta.'s)
- 12 – East Schodack V.F.C.
- 13 – Grafton V.F.C.
- 14 – Hemstreet Park V.F.D.
- 15 – Hoags Corners V.F.C. Inc.
- 16 – Hoosick V.F.C.
- 17 – Hoosick Falls V.F.C.
- 18 – Hoosic Valley V.F.C. #1
- 19 – Johnsonville V.F.C.
- 20 – Melrose V.F.C. Inc.
- 21 – Mountain View V.F.C.
- 22 – Nassau Hose Co. #1
- 23 – North Hoosick V.F.D. Inc.
- 24 – Petersburg V.F.D.
- 25 – Pittstown V.F.D.
- 26 – Pleasantdale V.F.C.
- 27 – Poestenkill V.F.C. (2 sta.'s)
- 28 – Raymertown V.F.D.
- 29 – Rensselaer F.D. (2 sta.'s)
- 30 – Schaghticoke V.F.D.
- 31 – Schodack Landing V.F.C. Inc.
- 32 – Schodack Valley V.F.C. Inc.
- 33 – Sherwood Park V.F.C. ***(now closed)***
- 34 – South Schodack V.F.C. Inc.
- 35 – Speigletown V.F.C.
- 36 – Stephentown V.F.D. Inc.
- 37 – Taborton V.F.D.
- 38 – Tsatsawassa Protective Fire Co. Inc.
- 39 – Troy F.D. (6 sta.'s)
- 40 – Valley Falls V.F.C.
- 41 – West Hoosick V.F.D. Inc.
- 42 – Wynantskill V.F.D.
- 43 – West Sand Lake V.F.D.
- 47 – White Creek V.F.C. #1 (Washington Co.)
- 50 – Castleton Vol. Amb. Service
- 51 – Grafton Vol. Amb.
- 52 – Hoags Corners Vol. Amb. Assn. Inc.
- 53 – Hoosic Valley Rescue/Squad
- 54 – Johnsonville Vol. Amb. Service Inc. ***(now closed)***
- 55 – North Greenbush Amb. Assoc.
- 56 – Petersburg Vol. Amb.
- 57 – Pittstown Vol. Emer. Corps
- 58 – Rensselaer Vol. Amb.
- 59 – Rensselaer Polytechnic Institute Amb. (R.P.I.)
- 60 – Sand Lake Amb.
- 61 – Town of Hoosick Rescue/Squad
- 62 – W.F. Bruen Rescue/Squad
- 63 – Empire Amb. Service
- 64 – Mohawk Amb. (2 sta.'s)
- 65 – John H. Ahearn Rescue/Squad (Saratoga Co.)
- 66 – Capital Dist. Amb. (Albany Co.)
- 67 – Nassau Amb.
- 68 – Northeast A.L.S. ***(now closed)***
- 75 – Bennington Rescue/Squad Inc. (Bennington, VT)

=== Rockland County ===
- 1 – Blauvelt V.F.C. Inc.
- 2 – Central Nyack V.F.D. (aka Central Engine Co. #6)
- 3 – Congers V.F.D. (aka Alert Hook, Ladder & Engine Co. #1) (2 sta.'s)
- 4 – Haverstraw V.F.D. (5 co.'s in 3 sta.'s)
- 5 – Hillburn V.F.D.
- 6 – Hillcrest V.F.C. #1 (3 sta.'s)
- 7 – Brewer Fire Engine Co. #1 (Monsey, NY)
- 8 – Nanuet Fire Engine Co. #1 Inc. (2 sta.'s)
- 9 – New City Fire Engine Co. #1
- 10 – Nyack V.F.D. (8 co.'s in 6 sta.'s)
- 11 – Orangeburg V.F.D.
- 12 – Pearl River V.F.D. (2 sta.'s)
- 13 – Empire Hose Co. #1 (Piermont, NY)
- 14 – Knickerbocker Engine Co. #1 (Valley Cottage, NY)
- 15 – Sloatsburg V.F.D. (2 sta.'s)
- 16 – Sparkill Palisades V.F.D. (aka John Paulding Engine Co. #1)
- 17 – Spring Valley V.F.D. (4 sta.'s)
- 18 – Stony Point V.F.D. (aka Wayne Hose Co. #1 Inc.) (2 sta.'s)
- 19 – Suffern V.F.D. (2 sta.'s)
- 20 – Tallman V.F.D.
- 21 – Volunteer Fire Assoc. of Tappan (2 sta.'s)
- 22 – Valley Cottage Engine Co. #1
- 23 – West Haverstraw V.F.D. (2 sta.'s)
- 24 – West Nyack Fire Engine Co. #1 (2 sta.'s)
- 25 – South Spring Valley V.F.C. (aka Hugh Gassner Fire Co. Inc.)
- 26 – David B. Roche V.F.C. (3 sta.'s in Garnerville, Thiells & West Haverstraw)
- 31 – Letchworth Village State Hospital F.D. (Thiells, NY) ***(disbanded)***
- 32 – Bear Mountain State Park F.D. ***(disbanded)***
- 33 – Helen Hayes Rehabilitation Hospital F.D. (West Haverstraw) ***(disbanded)***
- 34 – Rockland State Hospital F.D. (Orangeburg, NY) ***(disbanded)***
- 35 – Tappan Zee Bridge (N.Y.S. Thruway Authority) ***(disbanded)***
- 41 – U.S. Navy Ammunition Depot F.D. (Iona Island) ***(disbanded)***
- 44 – Rockland Co. Fire Control (Pomona, NY)
- 51 – Lederle Laboratories F.D. (Pearl River) ***(disbanded)***
- 52 – Novartis Pharmaceuticals Fire Brigade ***(disbanded)***

=== Saratoga County ===
- 10/11 – Arvin Hart V.F.C. (aka Stillwater Fire Dist.) (4 sta.'s)
- 12 –
  - Ballston Lake V.F.D.
  - Ballston Lake E.M.S.
- 13 –
  - Eagle Matt Lee Fire Co. #1 (Ballston Spa)
  - Community Emergency Corps (Ballston Spa)
- 14 – Union Fire Co. #2 (Ballston Spa)
- 15 – none
- 16 – Burnt Hills V.F.D. Sta. #1
- 17 – Burnt Hills V.F.D. Sta. #2
- 18 – Charlton Fire Dist. #1
- 19 –
  - Clifton Park Halfmoon Fire Dist. #1
  - Clifton Park & Halfmoon Emergency Corps
- 20 – Jessup's Landing E.M.S.
- 21 –
  - Corinth V.F.D.
  - Corinth Emergency Squad Inc. (now closed)
- 22 –
  - Edinburg V.F.C. Inc.
  - Edinburg Emergency Squad Inc.
- 23 –
  - Galway V.F.C. Inc.
  - Galway E.M.S.
- 24 – Gansevoort V.F.D.
- 25 – none
- 26 – Greenfield Center V.F.C. #1 (aka Greenfield Fire Dist.)
- 27 – Porter Corners V.F.C. #2 (aka Greenfield Fire Dist.)
- 28 – Middle Grove V.F.C. #3 (aka Greenfield Fire Dist.)
- 29 – Maple Ave. V.F.C. #4 (aka Greenfield Fire Dist.)
- 30 – none
- 31 – Luzerne Hadley Consolidated Fire Dist. & Emergency Squad (aka Van R. Rhodes V.F.C. Inc.) (Warren Co.)
- 32 – Halfmoon Waterford Fire Dist. #1 (2 sta.'s)
- 33 – Harmony Corners V.F.D.
- 34 – Hillcrest V.F.D.
- 35 – none
- 36 – Jonesville V.F.D. Sta. #1
- 37 – Jonesville V.F.D. Sta. #2
- 38 –
  - Malta Ridge V.F.C. (2 sta.'s)
  - Malta Stillwater E.M.S.
- 39-44 – Mechanicville F.D.
- 39 – John H. Ahearn Rescue Squad (now closed)
- 45 – Round Lake V.F.D. (2 sta.'s)
- 46 – Northside Fire Dist. (aka F.B. Peck Hose Co.) (Waterford)
- 47 –
  - Providence V.F.D. (2 sta.'s)
  - Providence V.A.C. Inc.
- 48 – none
- 49/50 – Quaker Springs V.F.D. (2 sta.'s)
- 51 – Rexford Fire Dist. (aka John McLane Hose Co.)
- 52 – Riverside Fire Dist. (disbanded and now Arvin Hart V.F.C. Sta. #4)
- 53 – Milton Fire Dist. #1 (aka Rock City Falls V.F.C.) (2 sta.'s)
- 54 – Round Lake V.F.D. (2 sta.'s)
- 55 – Saratoga Springs F.D. Sta. #1
- 56 – Saratoga Springs F.D. Sta. #2
- 57 –
  - Schuyler Hose Co. (Schuylerville)
  - General Schuyler Emergency Squad (Saratoga Springs)
- 58 –
  - South Glens Falls V.F.C. Inc. Sta. #1
  - Moreau Emergency Squad Inc. (Ft. Edward)
- 59 –
  - Stillwater V.F.D. (aka Newland Wood Fire Co.)
  - Stillwater Rescue Squad (now closed)
- 60 – South Glens Falls V.F.C. Sta. #2
- 61 – Victory Mills V.F.D. (aka David Nevins Fire Co. #1)
- 62/63 – Vischer Ferry V.F.C. (3 sta.'s)
- 64 –
  - Waterford V.F.D. (J.W. Ford Hose Co. #2 – Sta. #2)
  - Waterford Rescue Squad Inc.
- 65 – none
- 66 – Waterford V.F.D. (Charles H. Kavanaugh H&L Co. #1 – Sta. #3)
- 67 – Waterford V.F.D. (Knickerbocker Steamer Engine #1 – Sta. #1)
- 68 – West Charlton V.F.D.
- 69 – West Crescent Fire Dist. (aka W.K. Mansfield Hose Co.)
- 70 – none
- 71 –
  - Wilton V.F.D. Sta. #1
  - Wilton Emergency Inc.
- 72 – Wilton V.F.D. Sta. #2
- 73-80 – none
- 81 – Knolls Atomic Power Lab Fire Brigade (Ballston Spa)
- 82 – Momentive Fire Brigade (Waterford)
- 83 – Empire Ambulance (2 sta.'s)
- 84 – Tri-State Emergency Team (Waterford)
- 85 – GlobalFoundries, Emergency Response Team – Fire Brigade

=== Schenectady County ===
- City of Schenectady
  - Schenectady City F.D. (4 sta.'s)
- Town of Rotterdam Fire Dist.
  - 11 – Rotterdam Junction Fire Dist. #1
  - 12 – Rotterdam Fire Dist. #2
  - 13 – Carman Fire Dist. #3
  - 14 – Pattersonville Fire Dist. #4
  - 15 – Pine Grove Fire Dist. #5
  - 16 – South Schenectady Fire Dist. #6
  - 17 – Schonowe Fire Dist. #7
  - 18 – Plotterkill Fire Dist. #8 (Town of Princetown)
- Town of Glenville Fire Dist.
  - 21 – Hoffmans Fire Dist. #1 (now closed)
  - 22 – Alplaus Fire Dist. #2
  - 23 – East Glenville Fire Dist. #3
  - 24 – Scotia Fire Dist. #4
  - 25 – Beukendaal Fire Dist. #5
  - 26 – West Glenville Fire Dist. #6
  - 27 – Thomas Corners Fire Dist. #7
  - 28 – Glenville Hill Fire Dist. #8
  - 29 – Rectors Fire Dist. #9 (now closed)
- Town of Duanesburg Fire Dist.
  - 30 – Quaker Street Fire Dist. #1
  - 32 – Duanesburg Fire Dist. #2
  - 35 – Delanson Fire Dist. #5
  - 37 – Mariaville Fire Dist. #7
- Town of Niskayuna Fire Dist.
  - 40 – Niskayuna Fire Dist. #1 (Sta. #1)
  - 41 – Niskayuna Fire Dist. #2
  - 42 – Niskayuna Fire Dist. #1 (Sta. #2)
  - 43 – Stanford Heights V.F.D. (Albany Co.)
- Industrial Fire Brigades
  - 70/71 – Stratton Air National Guard F.D. (Glenville)
  - 81 – Knolls Atomic Power Lab Fire Brigade (Niskayuna)
  - 82 – General Electric Fire Brigade (Schenectady)
- E.M.S.
  - 91 – Rotterdam E.M.S. Inc. (2 sta.'s)
  - 93 – Duanesburg V.A.C. Inc.
  - 94 – Niskayuna Ambulance
  - 98 – Knolls Atomic Power Lab Ambulance (Niskayuna)
  - Mohawk Ambulance (Schenectady)

=== Schoharie County ===
- 01 – Blenheim Hose Co.
- 10 – Jefferson V.F.D. & R/S
- 11 – Town of Broome V.F.D. (aka Livingstonville V.F.D.)
- 12 – Middleburgh V.F.D.
- 13 – Richmondville V.F.C. Inc.
- 14 – Schoharie V.F.D. (aka Niagara Eng. Co. #6 Inc.)
- 15 – Sharon Springs Joint Fire Dist. & R/S
- 16 – Summit V.F.D. & R/S
- 17 – West Fulton V.F.D.
- 20 – Carlisle V.F.D.
- 30 – Central Bridge V.F.D.
- 40 – Charlotteville V.F.D.
- 48 – Schoharie Co. Fire Coordinator
- 50 –
  - Cobleskill V.F.D.
  - Cobleskill R/S
- 60 – Conesville Fire Dist. & R/S
- 70 – Esperance V.F.D.
- 80 – Gallupville V.F.D.
- 90 – Huntersland V.F.D.
- 94 – Rural/Metro Ambulance ***(now closed)***
- 94 – A.M.R Ambulance
- 96 – Middleburgh Emergency Volunteer Ambulance Corps (M.E.V.A.C.)
- 97 – Richmondville Volunteer Emergency Services (R.V.E.S.)
- 98 – Scho Wright Ambulance Service

=== Schuyler County ===
Department #

- 11 – Beaver Dams V.F.D.
- 12 – Burdett V.F.D.
- 13 – Mecklenburg V.F.C.
- 14 – Monterey V.F.C.
- 15 – Montour Falls V.F.D.
- 16 – Odessa V.F.D.
- 17 – Tyrone V.F.C. Inc.
- 18 – Valois Logan Hector V.F.C. Inc.
- 19 – Watkins Glen V.F.D.
- Schuyler Co. Volunteer Amb. Assoc. (Watkins Glen, NY)
- Hector Volunteer Ambulance

=== Seneca County ===
- 02 – Border City V.F.D. (2 sta.'s)
- 03 – Canoga V.F.D.
- 04 – Fayette V.F.D.
- 05 – Interlaken V.F.D.
- 07 – Junius V.F.D. (2 sta.'s)
- 08 – Lodi V.F.D.
- 09 – Magee V.F.D. (2 sta.'s)
- 11 – Ovid V.F.D.
- 12 – Seneca Falls V.F.D. (2 sta.'s)
- 13 – Romulus V.F.D.
- 14 – Varick V.F.C (2 sta.'s)
- 15 – Waterloo V.F.D
- North Seneca Volunteer Ambulance (Waterloo, NY)
- South Seneca Volunteer Ambulance (Ovid, NY)

=== St. Lawrence County ===
- 02 – Brasher-Winthrop V.F.D.
- 03 – Brier Hill V.F.D.
- 04 – Canton V.F.D. & Rescue Squad
- 05 – Colton V.F.D. (2 sta.'s)
- 06 – Cranberry Lake Fire & Rescue
- 07 – DeGrasse Clare & South Russell V.F.D.
- 08 – DeKalb Junction V.F.D. Inc.
- 09 – Edwards V.F.D.
- 10 – Fine V.F.D.
- 11 –
  - Gouverneur V.F.D.
  - Gouverneur Rescue Squad Inc.
- 12 – Hammond Fire & Rescue Inc.
- 13 – Hannawa Falls V.F.D.
- 14 – Helena V.F.D.
- 15 – Hermon V.F.D.
- 16 – Heuvelton V.F.D.
- 17 – Hopkinton Fort Jackson V.F.D.
- 18 – Lawrenceville V.F.D.
- 19 – Lisbon V.F.C.
- 20 – Louisville V.F.D. Inc. (2 sta.'s)
- 22 –
  - Madrid V.F.D.
  - Madrid Rescue Squad Inc.
- 23 –
  - Massena V.F.D.
  - Massena Rescue Squad
- 24 – Morley V.F.C. Inc. (2 sta.'s)
- 25 – Morristown Vol. Fire/Rescue Co. #1 & Rescue Squad
- 26 – Newton Falls V.F.D. Inc.
- 27 – Nicholville V.F.D.
- 28 –
  - Norfolk V.F.D. (3 sta.'s)
  - Norfolk Rescue Squad
- 29 – North Lawrence V.F.D. Inc.
- 30 – Norwood V.F.D.
- 31 –
  - Ogdensburg F.D.
  - Ogdensburg Volunteer Rescue Squad Inc.
- 33 – Parishville V.F.C. Inc. & Rescue Squad (2 sta.'s)
- 34 – Piercefield V.F.D.
- 35 – Pierrepont V.F.D.
- 36 –
  - Potsdam F.D.
  - Potsdam Volunteer Rescue Squad (2 sta.'s)
- 37 – Pyrites V.F.D.
- 40 – Rensselaer Falls V.F.D.
- 41 – Richville V.F.C. Inc.
- 42 – Russell V.F.D. & Rescue Squad
- 45 – Star Lake V.F.D. Inc.
- 46 –
  - Waddington V.F.D.
  - Waddington Rescue Squad
- 47 – West Potsdam V.F.D.
- 48 – West Stockholm V.F.D.
- 53 – Tri Town Volunteer Rescue Squad Inc.
- 55 – Oxbow V.F.D. (Jefferson Co.)
- 57 – Riverview Correctional Facility Fire Brigade (Ogdensburg, NY)
- 83 – Corning Inc. Fire Brigade (Canton, NY)
- R.B. Lawrence Ambulance (Canton, NY)
- Seaway Valley Ambulance (Massena, NY)

=== Steuben County ===
- 01 – Addison V.F.D. (aka Phoenix Hose V.F.C. #2 – 2 sta.'s)
- 02 – Arkport Hose Co. #1 Inc.
- 03 – Atlanta-North Cohocton V.F.C. (aka Hatch Hose Co.)
- 04 – Avoca Hose Co. #1
- 05 –
  - Bath V.F.D.
  - Vol. Amb. Corps of Bath NY, Inc.
- 06 – Bath V.A. Hospital Fire Brigade
- 07 – Bradford V.F.C.
- 08 – Cameron V.F.D.
- 09 – E.B. Packard Hose Co. Inc. (Campbell, NY)
- 10 – Canisteo F.D.
- 11 – Caton V.F.D.
- 12 – Cohocton V.F.D. & E.M.S.
- 13 – Coopers Plains Long Acres V.F.D.
- 14 – Corning F.D.
- 15 – East Campbell V.F.D.
- 16 – East Corning V.F.D.
- 17 – Forest View Gang Mills V.F.D. Inc.
- 18 – Fremont V.F.D. #1
- 19 – Gibson V.F.D. (2 sta.'s)
- 20 – Greenwood V.F.D.
- 21 –
  - Citizens Hose Co. Inc. (Hammondsport, NY)
  - Hammondsport V.A.C. Inc.
- 22 – Hornby V.F.C. Inc.
- 23 – Hornell F.D.
- 24 – Howard V.F.D.
- 25 – Jasper V.F.D.
- 26 – Lindley Presho V.F.D. Inc.
- 27 – North Hornell V.F.C.
- 28 – Painted Post V.F.D.
- 29 – Perkinsville V.F.D. (aka Fearless H&L Co. #1)
- 30 – Prattsburgh Protectives V.F.D.
- 31 – Pulteney V.F.C.
- 32 – West Union V.F.C.
- 33 – Savona V.F.D.
- 34 – South Corning V.F.D.
- 35 – South Dansville V.F.C. #1 Inc.
- 36 – South Hornell V.F.C.
- 37 – Thurston V.F.D.
- 38 – Troupsburg V.F.D.
- 39 – Tuscarora V.F.D.
- 40 – Wallace V.F.D.
- 41 – Wayland V.F.D.
- 42 – Woodhull V.F.D.
- 43 – North Corning V.F.D.
- 44 – Kanona V.F.D.
- 45 – Wayne V.F.C.
- American Medical Response (A.M.R. – Corning, NY)
- Springwater/Wayland E.M.S.

=== Suffolk County ===
1-0-0 First Division, Town of Babylon

- 1-1-0 – Amityville V.F.D. (3 sta.'s)
- 1-2-0 – Babylon V.F.D. (3 sta.'s)
- 1-3-0 – Copiague V.F.D. (2 sta.'s)
- 1-4-0 – Deer Park V.F.D. (2 sta.'s)
- 1-5-0 – East Farmingdale V.F.C. Inc. (4 sta.'s)
- 1-6-0 – Lindenhurst V.F.D. (5 sta.'s)
- 1-7-0 – North Amityville V.F.C. Inc. (2 sta.'s)
- 1-8-0 – North Babylon V.F.C. Inc. (5 sta.'s)
- 1-9-0 – West Babylon V.F.D. (3 sta.'s)
- 1-10-0 – Wyandanch V.F.C. Inc. (3 sta.'s)
- 1-11-0 – North Lindenhurst V.F.C. Inc. (2 sta.'s)
- 1-20-0 – Wyandanch-Wheatley Heights Ambulance Corps (1 sta.)
- 1-22-0 – Republic Airport Operations Fire Rescue Department (1 sta.)

2-0-0 Second Division, Town of Huntington

- 2-1-0 – Cold Spring Harbor V.F.D. (1 sta.)
- 2-2-0 – Halesite V.F.D. (1 sta.)
- 2-3-0 - Huntington V.F.D. (2 sta.'s)
- 2-4-0 – Huntington Manor V.F.D. (3 sta.'s)
- 2-5-0 – Melville V.F.D. (4 sta.'s)
- 2-6-0 – Centerport V.F.D. (2 sta.'s)
- 2-7-0 – Greenlawn V.F.D. Inc. (2 sta.'s)
- 2-8-0 – Dix Hills V.F.D. (3 sta.'s)
- 2-9-0 – Northport V.F.D. (2 sta.'s)
- 2-10-0 – East Northport V.F.D. (2 sta.'s)
- 2-11-0 – Commack V.F.D. Inc. (4 sta.'s)
- 2-12-0 – Eatons Neck V.F.D. (1 sta.)
- 2-13-0 – Northport Veteran's Administration Hospital F.D. (1 sta.)
- 2-15-0 – Huntington Community First Aid Squad Inc. (1 sta.)
- 2-16-0 – Commack Volunteer Ambulance Corps (1 sta.)

3-0-0 Third Division, Town of Islip

- 3-1-0 – Bay Shore V.F.D. (3 sta.'s)
- 3-2-0 – Brentwood V.F.D. (5 sta.'s)
- 3-3-0 – East Brentwood V.F.D. (1 sta.)
- 3-4-0 – Islip V.F.D. (2 sta.'s)
- 3-5-0 – East Islip V.F.D. (1 sta.)
- 3-6-0 – Islip Terrace V.F.D. (2 sta.'s)
- 3-7-0 – Central Islip V.F.D. (3 sta.'s)
- 3-8-0 – Hauppauge V.F.D. (3 sta.'s)
- 3-9-0 – Great River V.F.D. (1 sta.)
- 3-10-0 – West Sayville V.F.D. (2 sta.'s)
- 3-11-0 – Sayville V.F.D. (2 sta.'s)
- 3-12-0 – Bohemia V.F.D. (2 sta.'s)
- 3-13-0 – Lakeland V.F.D. (3 sta.'s)
- 3-14-0 – Bayport V.F.D. (1 sta.)
- 3-15-0 – Holbrook V.F.D. (3 sta.'s)
- 3-16-0 – Fair Harbor V.F.D. (1 sta.)
- 3-17-0 – West Islip V.F.D. (2 sta.'s)
- 3-18-0 – Saltaire V.F.C. (1 sta.)
- 3-20-0 – Ocean Beach V.F.D. (1 sta.)
- 3-21-0 – Kismet V.F.D. (2 sta.'s)
- 3-22-0 – McArthur Airport A.R.F.F. (1 sta.)
- 3-23-0 – Dunewood V.F.D. (merged w/ Fair Harbor V.F.D.)
- 3-24-0 – Bay Shore-Brightwaters Rescue Ambulance Inc. (1 sta.)
- 3-25-0 – Brentwood Legion Ambulance (1 sta.)
- 3-26-0 – Central Islip-Hauppauge Volunteer Ambulance Corps Inc. (1 sta.)
- 3-27-0 – Exchange Ambulance of the Islips (1 sta.)
- 3-28-0 – Community Ambulance Co. Inc. (1 sta.)

4-0-0 Fourth Division, Town of Smithtown

- 4-1-0 – Kings Park V.F.D. (1 sta.)
- 4-2-0 – Smithtown V.F.D. (3 sta.'s)
- 4-3-0 – Saint James V.F.D. Inc. (2 sta.'s)
- 4-4-0 – Nesconset V.F.D. (2 sta.'s)
- 4-5-0 – Nissequogue V.F.D. (1 sta.)

5-0-0 Fifth Division, Town of Brookhaven

- 5-1-0 – Bellport V.F.D. (1 sta.)
- 5-2-0 – Blue Point V.F.D. (1 sta.)
- 5-3-0 – Brookhaven V.F.D. (2 sta.'s)
- 5-4-0 – Center Moriches V.F.D. (1 sta.)
- 5-5-0 – Centereach V.F.D. (3 sta.'s)
- 5-6-0 – Coram V.F.D. (3 sta.'s)
- 5-7-0 – East Moriches V.F.D. (1 sta.)
- 5-8-0 – Eastport V.F.D. (1 sta.)
- 5-9-0 – Gordon Heights V.F.D. (1 sta.)
- 5-10-0 – Hagerman V.F.D. (1 sta.)
- 5-11-0 – Holtsville V.F.D. (1 sta.)
- 5-12-0 – Mastic V.F.D. (2 sta.'s)
- 5-13-0 – Mastic Beach V.F.D. (1 sta.)
- 5-14-0 – Medford V.F.D. (3 Sta.)
- 5-15-0 – Middle Island V.F.D. (2 sta.'s)
- 5-16-0 – Manorville V.F.D. (3 sta.'s)
- 5-17-0 – North Patchogue V.F.D. (3 sta.'s)
- 5-18-0 – Farmingville V.F.D. (2 sta.'s)
- 5-19-0 – Patchogue F.D. (2 sta.'s)
- 5-20-0 – Brookhaven National Laboratory F.D. (1 sta.)
- 5-21-0 – Point O'Woods V.F.D. (1 sta.)
- 5-22-0 – Ridge V.F.D. (3 sta.'s)
- 5-24-0 – Ronkonkoma V.F.D. (1 sta.)
- 5-25-0 – Selden V.F.D. (3 sta.'s)
- 5-26-0 – Cherry Grove V.F.D. (1 sta.)
- 5-27-0 – Davis Park V.F.D. (1 sta.)
- 5-28-0 – Fire Island Pines V.F.D. (1 sta.)
- 5-29-0 – Ocean Bay Park V.F.D. (1 sta.)
- 5-30-0 – Yaphank V.F.D. (1 sta.)
- 5-33-0 – Port Jefferson E.M.S. (1 sta.)
- 5-34-0 – Medford Volunteer Ambulance Inc. (2 sta.'s)
- 5-35-0 – Stony Brook Volunteer Ambulance Corps (1 sta.)
- 5-37-0 – Mastic Volunteer Ambulance Co. (1 sta.)
- 5-38-0 – Shirley Community Ambulance Co. (1 sta.)
- 5-39-0 – Mastic Beach Volunteer Ambulance Corps (1 sta.)
- 5-40-0 – Manorville Community Ambulance (2 sta.'s)
- 5-42-0 – South Country Ambulance Co. (3 sta.'s)
- 5-47-0 – East Moriches Community Ambulance (2 sta.'s)
- 5-49-0 – Patchogue Ambulance Co. (1 sta.)
- 5A-1-0 – Port Jefferson V.F.D. (1 sta.)
- 5A-2-0 – Setauket V.F.D. (3 sta.'s)
- 5A-3-0 – Stony Brook V.F.D. (2 sta.'s)
- 5A-4-0 – Terryville V.F.D. (3 sta.'s)
- 5A-5-0 – Mount Sinai V.F.D. (2 sta.'s)
- 5A-6-0 – Sound Beach V.F.D. (2 sta.'s)
- 5A-7-0 – Rocky Point V.F.D. (3 sta.'s)
- 5A-9-0 – Miller Place V.F.D. (2 sta.'s)

6-0-0 Sixth Division, Town of Riverhead

- 6-1-0 – Jamesport V.F.D. (2 sta.'s)
- 6-2-0 – Riverhead V.F.D. (4 sta.'s)
- 6-3-0 – Wading River V.F.D. (2 sta.'s)
- 6-4-0 – Calverton V.F.D. (disbanded and became Riverhead V.F.D. Sta. #3)
- 6-5-0 – Riverhead Volunteer Ambulance Corps Inc. (2 sta.'s)
- 6-6-0 – Peconic Ambulance Service (disbanded)

7-0-0 Seventh Division, Town of Southampton

- 7-1-0 – Sag Harbor V.F.D. (4 sta.'s)
- 7-2-0 – Bridgehampton V.F.D. (1 sta.)
- 7-3-0 – Southampton V.F.D. (4 sta.'s)
- 7-4-0 – North Sea V.F.D. (2 sta.'s)
- 7-5-0 – Hampton Bays V.F.D. (2 sta.'s)
- 7-6-0 – East Quogue V.F.D. (2 sta.'s)
- 7-7-0 – Quogue V.F.D. (1 sta.)
- 7-8-0 – Westhampton Beach V.F.D. (2 sta.'s)
- 7-9-0 – Flanders V.F.D. (1 sta.)
- 7-10-0 – 106th Rescue Wing F.D. (aka Gabreski A.N.G. F.D.) (1 sta.)
- 7-12-0 – Hampton Bays Volunteer Ambulance Corps (2 sta.'s)
- 7-14-0 – Southampton Volunteer Ambulance (1 sta.)
- 7-15-0 – Sag Harbor Volunteer Ambulance Corps (1 sta.)
- 7-16-0 – Westhampton War Memorial Ambulance Assoc. Inc. (1 sta.)
- 7-17-0 – Flanders Northampton Volunteer Ambulance Co. Inc. (1 sta.)
- 7-18-0 – Southampton Village Volunteer Ambulance (1 sta.)

8-0-0 Eighth Division, Town of Southold

- 8-1-0 – Orient V.F.D. (1 sta.)
- 8-2-0 – East Marion V.F.D. (1 sta.)
- 8-3-0 – Greenport V.F.D. (2 sta.'s)
- 8-4-0 – Southold V.F.D. (2 sta.'s)
- 8-5-0 – Cutchogue V.F.D. (1 sta.)
- 8-6-0 – Mattituck V.F.D. (1 sta.)
- 8-7-0 – Fishers Island V.F.D. (1 sta.)
- 8-8-0 – Plum Island F.D. (1 sta.)

9-0-0 Ninth Division, Town of East Hampton

- 9-1-0 – East Hampton V.F.D. & Ambulance (1 sta.)
- 9-2-0 – Amagansett V.F.D. (1 sta.)
- 9-3-0 – Montauk V.F.D. (2 sta.'s)
- 9-4-0 – Springs V.F.D. (1 sta.)

10-0-0 Tenth Division, Town of Shelter Island

- 10-1-0 – Shelter Island V.F.D. (3 sta.'s)
- 10-2-0 – Shelter Island Heights V.F.D. (disbanded and now Shelter Island V.F.D. Sta. #3)
- 10-4-0 – Shelter Island Town Ambulance (1 sta.)

11-0-0 Eleventh Division, private ambulance co.'s

- Hunter E.M.S. (Bay Shore)

=== Sullivan County ===
- 10 – Hortonville V.F.C. (Battalion 1)
- 11 – Hurleyville V.F.D. (Battalion 3)
- 12 –
  - Jeffersonville V.F.D. (Battalion 4)
  - Jeffersonville Vol. First Aid Corps Inc. (District 4)
- 13 – Kauneonga Lake V.F.D. (Battalion 4)
- 14 – Kenoza Lake V.F.D. (Battalion 4)
- 15 –
  - Lake Huntington V.F.C. Inc. (2 sta.'s)/(Battalion 1)
  - Town of Cochecton V.A.C. (District 4)
- 16 – Lava V.F.D. (Battalion 1)
- 17 – Liberty V.F.D. (Battalion 2)
- 18 –
  - Livingston Manor V.F.D. Inc. (Battalion 2)
  - Livingston Manor V.A.C. (District 2)
- 19 – Long Eddy Hose Co. (Battalion 1)
- 20 –
  - Loch Sheldrake V.F.D. (Battalion 3)
  - Town of Liberty V.A.C. Inc. (District 2)
- 21 –
  - Lumberland V.F.D. Inc. (2 sta.'s)/(Battalion 1)
  - Lumberland V.F.D. Inc. Amb. (District 1)
- 22 – Monticello V.F.D. (Battalion 4)
- 23 –
  - Mountaindale V.F.C. #1 (Battalion 3)
  - Mountaindale First Aid Squad (District 3)
- 24 –
  - Narrowsburg V.F.D. (Battalion 1)
  - Tusten V.A.S. (District 1)
- 25 –
  - Neversink V.F.D. (Battalion 3)
  - Neversink V.F.D. Amb. (District 2)
- 26 – North Branch V.F.D. Inc. (Battalion 2)
- 27 –
  - Rock Hill V.F.D. (Battalion 5)
  - Rock Hill V.A.C. (District 5)
- 29 –
  - Roscoe-Rockland V.F.D. (Battalion 2)
  - Roscoe-Rockland V.A.C. (District 2)
- 30 – Smallwood Mongaup Valley V.F.C. (Battalion 4)
- 31 – Fallsburg V.F.D. (Battalion 3)
- 32 – Summitville V.F.C. #1 (Battalion 5)
- 33 – Swan Lake V.F.D. (Battalion 4)
- 34 – Westbrookville V.F.C. #1 Inc. (Battalion 5)
- 35 –
  - White Lake V.F.C. Inc. (Battalion 4)
  - Bethel V.A.C. (District 4)
- 36 – White Sulphur Springs V.F.D. Inc. (Battalion 2)
- 37 –
  - Woodbourne V.F.C. #1 (Battalion 3)
  - Woodbourne V.F.C. #1 Amb. (District 3)
- 38 – Woodridge V.F.D. (Battalion 3)
- 39 –
  - Wurtsboro V.F.C. #1 (Battalion 5)
  - Mamakating First Aid Squad (District 5)
- 40 – Youngsville V.F.D. (Battalion 2)
- 42 – Yulan V.F.D. Inc. (3 sta.'s)/(Battalion 1)
- 43 – American Legion Post 1363 Ambulance (Highland)/(District 1)
- 45 – Mobile Life Support Services (countywide)/(District 5)
- 46 – Regional E.M.S. (disbanded)/(District 5)
- 47 – Catskills Hatzalah E.M.S. (countywide but sta. is in Fallsburg)/(District 5)
- 51 – MobileMedic E.M.S. (Hurleyville)/(District 5)
- 53 –
  - Sullivan Co. 9-1-1 (Battalion 4)
  - Sullivan Co. Training Facility (Battalion 4)
  - Sullivan Co. Airport A.R.F.F. (Battalion 4)
- 61 – Beaverkill Valley V.F.C. Inc. (Battalion 2)
- 62 – Bloomingburg V.F.C. #1 (Battalion 5)
- 63 –
  - Callicoon V.F.D. (Battalion 1)
  - Upper Delaware V.A.C. (District 4)
- 64 – Callicoon Center V.F.D. Inc. (Battalion 2)
- 65 – Claryville V.F.D. (2 sta.'s)/(Battalion 3)/(Ulster Co.)
- 66 – Forestburgh V.F.C. #1 (Battalion 5)
- 67 –
  - Grahamsville V.F.D. (Battalion 3)
  - Grahamsville First Aid Squad (District 2)
- 68 – Hankins-Fremont V.F.D. (Battalion 1)
- 69 – Highland Lake V.F.D. (Battalion 1)
- 75 – LifeNet Medevac (countywide)/(District 5)

=== Tioga County ===
- 01 – Apalachin V.F.D. & Emergency Squad (3 sta.'s)
- 02 – Berkshire V.F.C.
- 03 – Campville V.F.D. Inc. (3 sta.'s)
- 04 –
  - Candor V.F.D. (3 sta.'s)
  - Candor Emergency Squad Inc.
- 05 – Halsey Valley V.F.D.
- 06 – Newark Valley V.F.D. Inc.
- 07 – Nichols V.F.D. & Emergency Squad
- 08 – Owego V.F.D. & Emergency Squad (4 sta.'s)
- 09 – Richford V.F.D.
- 10 –
  - Spencer V.F.D.
  - Spencer Emergency Squad
- 11 – Tioga Center V.F.D. & Emergency Squad
- 12 –
  - Greater Valley E.M.S. (Sayre, PA)
  - Van Etten V.F.D. (Chemung Co.)
- 13 – Waverly Barton V.F.D. (2 sta.'s)
- 14 – Weltonville V.F.C.
- 17 – Lockheed Martin Fire Brigade (disbanded)
- 18 – Southside V.F.C. (Owego, NY)
- 19 – Lockwood V.F.C.
- 20 – Berkshire Emergency Squad Inc.

=== Tompkins County ===
- 1 – Brooktondale V.F.C. Inc.
- 2 – Cayuga Heights V.F.C. #1
- 3 – Etna V.F.D.
- 4 – Danby V.F.C.
- 5 –
  - Neptune Hose Co. #1 Inc. (Dryden, NY)
  - Dryden Ambulance Inc.
- 6 – Enfield V.F.C. Inc.
- 7 – W.B. Strong Fire Co. Inc. (Freeville, NY)
- 8 – Groton V.F.D.
- 9 – ** Ithaca F.D. (4 sta.'s)
  - Bangs Ambulance (Ithaca, NY)
- 11 – Lansing V.F.D. (4 sta.'s)
- 12 – McLean V.F.D.
- 13 – Newfield V.F.C
- 14 – West Danby V.F.D.
- 15 – Slaterville V.F.D. & Ambulance
- 17 – Speedsville V.F.C.
- 18 – Trumansburg V.F.D. & Ambulance
- 19 – Varna V.F.C. Inc.
- 22 – Ithaca Tompkins Regional Airport Crash/Fire/Rescue
- 24 – Cornell University E.M.S. (Ithaca, NY)

=== Ulster County ===
- 15 – Accord Fire District (3 sta.'s)
- 16 – Binnewater Fire Company (disbanded)
- 17 – Big Indian Fire Department
- 18 – Bloomington Fire Department (2 sta.'s)
- 19 – Centerville-Cedar Grove Fire Company (2 sta.'s)
- 21 – Clintondale Fire Company
- 22 – Connelly, New York Hasbrouck Engine Company #1
- 23 – Cottekill Fire Department
- 24 – Cragsmoor Fire Company
- 25 – East Kingston Fire Company (2 sta.'s)
- 26 – Ellenville Fire Department (4 sta.'s)
- 27 – Esopus Fire Company
- 28 – Gardiner Fire Department (2 sta.'s)
- 29 – Glasco Fire Company
- 30 – High Falls Fire Department
- 31 – Highland Fire Company (2 sta.'s)
- 32 – Hurley Fire Department
- 33 – Kerhonkson, New York Fire Company
- 34 – Kripplebush-Lyonsville Fire Company
- 35 – Lomontville Fire Company
- 36 – Malden-West Camp Fire Department (2 sta.'s)
- 37 – Marbletown Fire Company (disbanded)
- 38 – Marlboro Hose Company #1
- 39 – Milton Engine Company #1
- 40 – Modena Fire & Rescue
- 41 – Mt. Marion Fire Department
- 42 – Napanoch Fire Company (2 sta.'s)
- 43 – New Paltz Fire Department (2 sta.'s)
- 44 – Olive Fire Department #1 Inc. (5 sta.'s)
- 45 – Phoenicia Fire Department (3 sta.'s)
- 46 – Pine Hill Fire Company #1 Inc.
- 47 – Plattekill Fire Department (2 sta.'s)
- 48 – Port Ewen Fire Department (2 sta.'s)
- 49 – Rifton Fire Department (2 sta.'s)
- 50 – Rosendale Fire Department
- 51 – Ruby Fire Company
- 52 – St. Remy Fire Department (2 sta.'s)
- 53 – Saugerties Fire Department (2 sta.'s)
- 54 – Sawkill Fire District #1
- 55 – Saxton-Katsbaan Fire Company (2 sta.'s)
- 56 – Ulster County, New York Emergency Communications Center
- 57 – Shawangunk Valley Fire Department
- 58 – Stone Ridge Fire Company
- 59 – Spring Lake Fire Company
- 60 – Tilson Fire Department
- 61 – Ulster Hose Company #5 Inc. (2 sta.'s)
- 62 – Vly Atwood Fire Department (disbanded)
- 63 – Walker Valley Chemical Engine Company #1
- 64 – Wallkill Hook, Ladder & Hose Company
- 65 – Claryville Fire Department
- 66 – West Hurley Fire Company #1 (3 sta.'s)
- 67 – Woodstock Fire District (5 sta.'s)
- 68 – Kingston Fire Company
- 71 – Kerhonkson Accord First Aid Squad Inc.
- 72 – Marbletown First Aid Unit
- 73 – Olive First Aid Unit (2 sta.'s)
- 74 – Ellenville First Aid & Rescue Squad Inc.
- 75 – Town of Esopus Volunteer Ambulance Squad Inc. (T.E.V.A.S.)
- 76 – Wallkill Volunteer Ambulance Corps
- 77 – Town of Marlboro Volunteer Ambulance (now Ambulnz by DocGo)
- 78 – Town of Shandaken Ambulance Service (2 sta.'s)
- 79 – Diaz Memorial Ambulance Service Inc. (Saugerties, New York)
- 80 – New Paltz Rescue/Squad
- 82 – Transcare E.M.S. (Wappingers Falls)
- 83 – Mobile Life Support Services (now, Empress E.M.S.)

=== Warren County ===
- Bakers Mills-Sodom V.F.C.
- Bay Ridge V.F.C. Inc.
- Bolton V.F.C.
- Bolton E.M.S.
- Chestertown V.F.C. Inc.
- Garnet Lake V.F.D.
- Glens Falls F.D. (2 sta.'s)
- Hague V.F.D. Inc.
- Hague Emergency Squad
- Horicon V.F.D. Inc. (2 sta.'s)
- Johnsburg V.F.C. Inc.
- Johnsburg Emergency Squad Inc.
- Lake George V.F.D.
- Lake George Emergency Squad
- Luzerne-Hadley Consolidated Fire Dist.
- North Creek V.F.C. Inc.
- North Queensbury V.F.C.
- North River V.F.C.
- North Warren Emergency Squad
- Pottersville V.F.D.
- Queensbury Central V.F.C. Inc. (2 sta.'s)
- Queensbury EMS (2 sta.'s) (merger between North Queensbury Rescue Squad and Bay Ridge Rescue Squad)
- Riverside V.F.D. Inc.
- Rockwell Falls Ambulance Service (Lake Luzerne Emergency)
- South Queensbury V.F.C. Inc.
- Stony Creek V.F.C. Inc. & Emergency Squad
- Thurman V.F.C. Inc.
- Warrensburg V.F.D.
- Warrensburg E.M.S. Inc.
- West Glens Falls V.F.C. #1 Inc. (2 sta.'s)
- West Glens Falls Emergency Squad

=== Washington County ===
- 21 –
  - J.A. Barkley Hose Co. #1 Inc. (aka Argyle Fire & Rescue)
  - Argyle E.M.S.
- 22 –
  - Cambridge V.F.D.
  - Cambridge Valley Rescue Squad Inc.
- 23 – Cossayuna V.F.D.
- 24 – Dresden V.F.C. #1
- 25 – Easton V.F.C. Inc. (2 sta.'s)
- 26 –
  - Fort Ann V.F.C. Inc.
  - Fort Ann Rescue Squad Inc.
- 27 –
  - Fort Edward V.F.D. (2 sta.'s)
  - Fort Edward Rescue Squad Inc.
- 28 – Granville Engine & Hose Co. #1
- 29 –
  - Granville Hook & Ladder Co. Inc.
  - Norton Hose Co. ***disbanded***
  - Granville Rescue Squad Inc.
- 31 – Great Meadow Correctional Facility
- 32 –
  - Greenwich V.F.D.
  - Easton-Greenwich Rescue Squad
- 33 – Hampton V.F.C. Inc.
- 34 – Hartford V.F.C. Inc.
- 35 – Hebron V.F.C. Inc. (2 sta.'s)
- 36 – Hudson Falls V.F.D.
- 37 – Huletts Landing V.F.C.
- 38 – Kingsbury Volunteer Hose Co. #1 Inc. (2 sta.'s)
- 39 – Middle Falls V.F.D.
- 41 – Penrhyn Engine & Hose V.F.C. Inc.
- 42 – North Granville Hose Co. Inc.
- 43 – Putnam V.F.C.
- 44 –
  - Salem V.F.D. Inc.
  - Salem Rescue Squad
- 45 – Shushan V.F.C. Inc.
- 46 – West Fort Ann V.F.C. Inc.
- 47 – White Creek V.F.C. #1
- 48 – Whitehall V.F.C. Inc.
- 49 –
  - Skenesborough Central V.F.C.
  - Skenesborough Emergency Squad
- 51 – Dorset Fire Dist. #1 (Bennington Co., VT)
- 52 –
  - Fair Haven V.F.D. (Rutland Co., VT)
  - Fair Haven Rescue Squad (Rutland Co., VT)
- 53 – Middletown Springs V.F.D. (Rutland Co., VT)
- 54 – Pawlet V.F.D. (Rutland Co., VT)
- 55 –
  - Poultney V.F.D. (aka Poultney Hose Co. #1) (Rutland Co., VT)
  - Poultney Rescue Squad (Rutland Co., VT)
- 56 – Rupert V.F.C. (Bennington Co., VT)
- 57 – Wells V.F.D. Inc. (Rutland Co., VT)
- 58 – West Pawlet V.F.D. (Rutland Co., VT)
- 59 – East Dorset Fire Dist. #1 (Bennington Co., VT)
- 71 –
  - Bay Ridge V.F.C. Inc. (Warren Co., NY)
  - Queensbury EMS (Warren Co., NY)
- 72 –
- 73 – Buskirk V.F.D. (Rensselaer Co., NY)
- 74 – EMPTY (formerly Empire Ambulance prior to closure in 2023)
- 79 – Arlington Rescue Squad (Bennington Co., VT)
- 86 – Moreau Emergency Squad (Ft. Edward (Saratoga Co., NY))
- 87 – South Queensbury V.F.C. Inc. (Warren Co., NY)
- 88 - Pilot Knob V.F.D.
- 89 -
  - Ticonderoga Fire (Essex County)
  - Ticonderoga EMS (Essex County)
  - Lamoille Ambulance Service (Essex County)

=== Wayne County ===
- 01 – Alton V.F.D.
- 02 – Clyde Dept. of Fire-Rescue Services
- 03 – East Palmyra V.F.D. Inc.
- 04 – East Williamson Fire Dist.
- 05 – Fairville V.F.D.
- 06 – Lincoln V.F.D.
- 07 – Lyons V.F.D.
- 08 – Macedon V.F.D. (disbanded & now South Macedon Fire/Rescue)
- 09 – Macedon Center V.F.D.
- 10 – Marion V.F.D. Inc.
- 11 – Newark V.F.D.
- 12 – North Rose V.F.D.
- 13 – Ontario V.F.C. (2 sta.'s)
- 14 – Palmyra V.F.D.
- 15 – Pultneyville V.F.C.
- 16 – Red Creek V.F.D.
- 17 – Rose V.F.C. Inc.
- 18 – Savannah V.F.C. Inc.
- 19 – Sodus V.F.D.
- 20 – South Butler Fire Dist.
- 21 – Sodus Center V.F.D.
- 22 – Sodus Point V.F.D.
- 23 – Union Hill V.F.D. (disbanded)
- 24 – Wallington V.F.D.
- 25 – Walworth V.F.D. & Amb.
- 26 – West Walworth V.F.D.
- 27 – Williamson V.F.D.
- 28 – Wolcott V.F.D.
- 29 – none
- 30 – Marbletown V.F.D.
- 31 – South Macedon Fire/Rescue
- 59 – Wayne Co. 9-1-1 Center
- Eastern Wayne EMS
- Lakeshore Volunteer Ambulance (formerly Wolcott Area Volunteer Ambulance Corps)
- Town of Lyons Ambulance
- Macedon Town Ambulance
- Marion V.A.C., Inc. (disbanded)
- Newark Arcadia Volunteer Ambulance (N.A.V.A.)
- Ontario Volunteer Emergency Squad (O.V.E.S.)
- Silver Waters Community Ambulance Service (Sodus Point, NY)
- Sodus Town Ambulance Corps (S.T.A.C.)
- Union Hill Ambulance (disbanded)
- Western Wayne Ambulance, Inc. (formerly Walworth Ambulance Corps)
- Williamson Volunteer Ambulance Service (W.V.A.S.)

=== Westchester County ===
==== Battalion 10 ====
- 208 – Croton On Hudson Fire Dept. (3 sta.'s)
- 227 – Cortlandt Engine Co. Inc. (aka Montrose Fire District)
- 234 – Peekskill Fire Dept.
- 249 – Verplanck Fire Dept. (2 sta.'s)
- 255 – Buchanan Engine Co. #1 Inc.
- 257 – Montrose V.A. Hosp. F.D.
- 265 – Indian Point Fire Brigade
- 550 – Croton E.M.S.
- 750 – Peekskill Comm. V.A.C.
- 880 – Cortlandt Comm. V.A.C. Inc.

==== Battalion 11 ====
- 219 – Hawthorne V.F.C. #1
- 237 – Pleasantville Fire Dept. (2 sta.'s)
- 247 – Thornwood Fire Dept. (2 sta.'s)
- 248 – Valhalla Fire Dept. (3 sta.'s)
- 254 – Grasslands Fire Brigade (2 sta.'s)
- 760 – Pleasantville V.A.C.
- 820 – Valhalla V.A.C. Inc.

==== Battalion 12 ====
- 205 – Briarcliff Manor Fire Dept. (2 sta.'s)
- 231 – Sleepy Hollow Fire Dept. (3 sta.'s)
- 233 – Ossining Fire Dept. (7 sta.'s)
- 238 – Pocantico Hills Fire Dept. (aka Hilltop Engine Co. #1)
- 261 – Sing Sing Correctional Facility
- 263 – Archville Fire Dept.
- 730 – Sleepy Hollow V.A.C.
- 740 – Ossining V.A.C. Inc.

==== Battalion 13 ====
- 207 – Croton Falls Fire Dept. (2 sta.'s)
- 214 – Golden's Bridge Fire Dept.
- 240 – Pound Ridge Fire Dept.
- 244 – Somers Fire Dept.
- 245 – South Salem Fire Dept.
- 256 – Vista Fire Dept.
- 670 – Lewisboro V.A.C.
- 720 – North Salem V.A.C.
- 780 – Pound Ridge V.A.C.

==== Battalion 14 ====
- 201 – Ardsley Fire Dept
- 209 – Dobbs Ferry Fire Dept. (2 sta.'s)
- 211 – Elmsford Fire Dept. (3 sta.'s)
- 212 – Fairview Fire Dept. (2 sta.'s)
- 217 – Hartsdale Fire Dept. (2 sta.'s)
- 218 – Hastings on Hudson Fire Dept. (4 sta.'s)
- 220 – Irvington Fire Dept.
- 246 – Tarrytown Fire Dept. (5 sta.'s)
- 500 – Ardsley Secor V.A.C.
- 560 – Dobbs Ferry V.A.C. Inc.
- 590 – Greenburgh Police E.M.S.
- 640 – Irvington V.A.C.
- 810 – Tarrytown V.A.C.

==== Battalion 15 ====
- 216 – Harrison Fire Dept.
- 222 – Larchmont Fire Dept.
- 223 – Town of Mamaroneck Fire Dept.
- 224 – Mamaroneck Village Fire Dept. (4 sta.'s)
- 239 – Port Chester Fire Dept. (4 sta.'s)
- 242 – Rye Fire Dept. (2 sta.'s)
- 266 – Rye Brook Fire Dept.
- 610 – Harrison E.M.S.
- 660 – Larchmont V.A.C.
- 680 – Mamaroneck E.M.S.
- 770 – Port Chester-Rye-Rye Brook E.M.S.

==== Battalion 16 ====
- 202 – Armonk Fire Dept.
- 203 – Bedford Hills Fire Dept.
- 204 – Bedford Fire Dept.
- 206 – Chappaqua Fire Dept. (2 sta.'s)
- 221 – Katonah Fire Dept.
- 228 – Mount Kisco Fire Dept. (3 sta.'s)
- 258 – Banksville Independent Fire Co. Inc.
- 262 – Bedford Hills Correctional Facility
- 400 – Westchester E.M.S.
- 540 – Chappaqua V.A.C.
- 650 – Katonah Bedford Hills V.A.C.
- 700 – Mount Kisco V.A.C.

==== Battalion 17 ====
- 213 – Continental Village Fire Dept.
- 225 – Millwood Fire Dept. (2 sta.'s)
- 226 – Mohegan Fire Dept. (4 sta.'s)
- 253 – Yorktown Heights Engine Co. #1 (3 sta.'s)
- 860 – Yorktown V.A.C.

==== Battalion 18 ====
- 210 – Eastchester F.D. (5 sta.'s)
- 215 – Greenville F.D.
- 229 – Mount Vernon F.D. (4 sta.'s)
- 230 – New Rochelle F.D. (5 sta.'s)
- 235 – Pelham F.D.
- 236 – Pelham Manor F.D.
- 252 – Yonkers Fire Department (12 sta.'s)
- 300 – Empress E.M.S. (2 sta.'s, both in New Rochelle)
- 320 – Empress E.M.S. (Mt. Vernon)
- 330 – Empress E.M.S. (Yonkers)
- 570 – Eastchester V.A.C.

==== Battalion 19 ====
- 232 – North White Plains F.D. #1
- 241 – Purchase F.D.
- 243 – Scarsdale F.D. (3 sta.'s)
- 250 – West Harrison F.D.
- 251 – White Plains F.D. (7 sta.'s)
- 259 – Westchester Co. Airport A.R.F.F.
- 310 – Empress E.M.S. (White Plains)
- 790 – Scarsdale V.A.C.

=== Wyoming County ===
- Arcade V.F.D.
- Attica V.F.D. Inc. (2 sta.'s)
- Bennington V.F.C. Inc.
- Castile V.F.D.
- Cowlesville V.F.C. Inc.
- Eagle Hose Co. #1 (aka Bliss V.F.C.)
- Gainesville V.F.D.
- Genesee Falls V.F.C. Inc. ***(disbanded)***
- Harris Corners V.F.D.
- North Java V.F.C. Inc. (2 sta.'s)
- Perry V.F.D.
- Perry Emer. Amb. Inc.
- Perry Center V.F.D.
- Pike V.F.D.
- Sheldon V.F.C.
- Silver Springs V.F.D.
- Strykersville V.F.C. (2 sta.'s)
- Varysburg V.F.D.
- Warsaw V.F.D. & Rescue/Squad (2 sta.'s)
- Wyoming Hook & Ladder Inc. (2 sta.'s)

=== Yates County ===
- 01 – Bellona Fire Dist.
- 02 – Benton V.F.D. Inc.
- 03 – Branchport/Keuka Park V.F.D. (2 sta.'s)
- 04 – Dresden V.F.D.
- 05 – Dundee V.F.D. & Amb.
- 06 – Himrod V.F.D.
- 07 – none
- 08 – Middlesex Hose Co. Inc.
- 09 – Penn Yan F.D.
- 10 – Potter V.F.D.
- 11 – Rushville Hose Co. (Ontario Co.)
- 12–17 – none
- 18 – Maxfield Hose Co. Inc. (2 sta.'s – Ontario Co.)
- Middlesex Valley Vol. Amb. Service Inc.
- Penn Yan Area Vol. Amb. Corps Inc.

== See also ==
- List of fire departments
- New York Fire Patrol
