= Saugerties, New York =

Town in Ulster County, New York, US

- Town
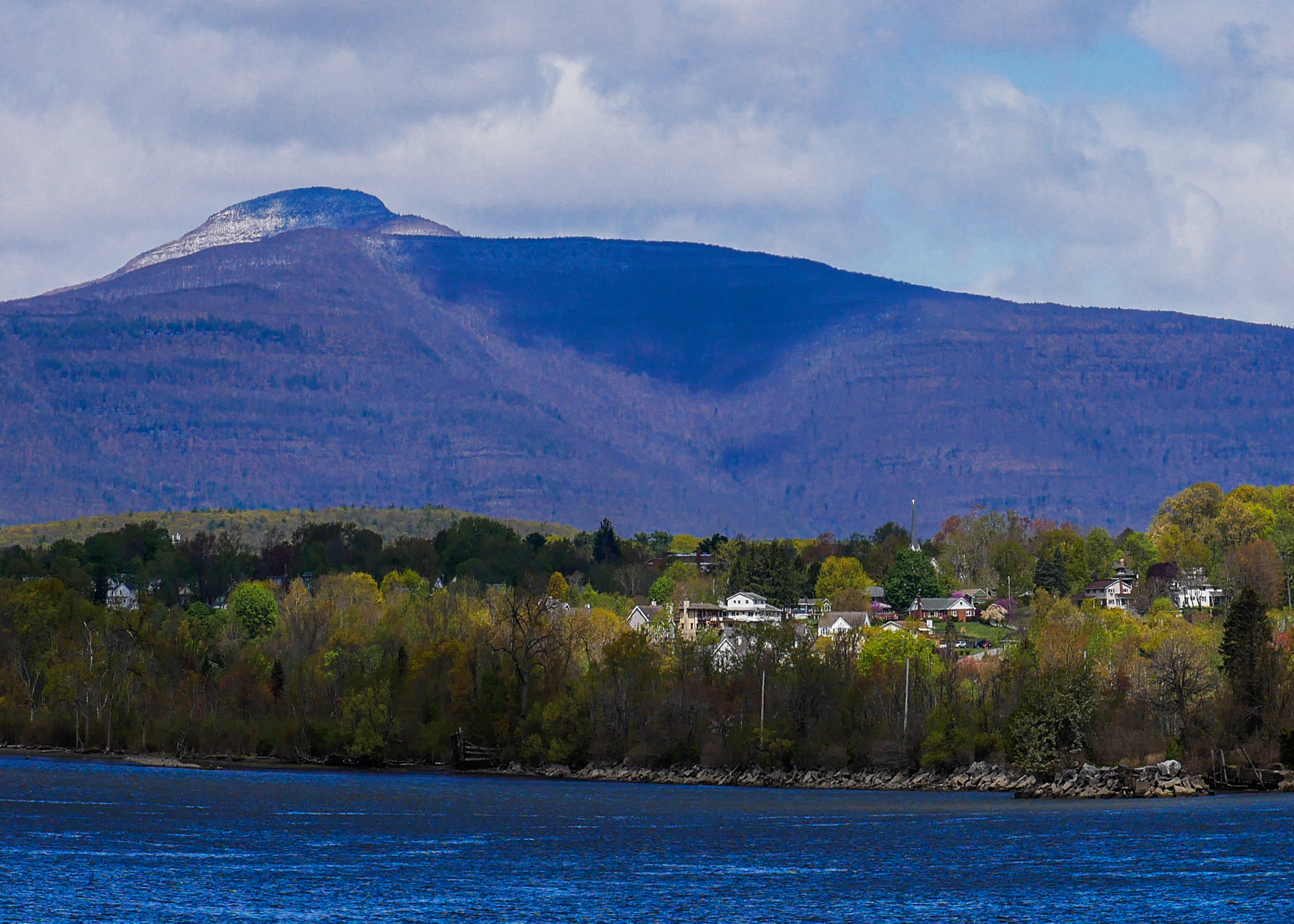
- Saugerties from the Hudson

- Location in Ulster County and the state of New York.

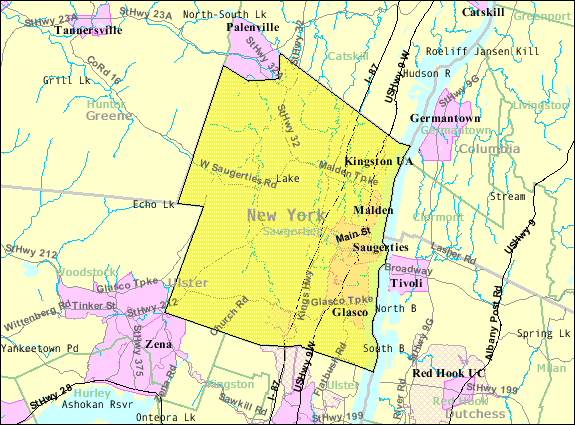
- U.S. census map of town

- Location within the United States
- Coordinates: 42°04′40″N 73°57′10″W
- Country: United States
- State: New York
- County: Ulster

Area
  - Total: 67.96 sq mi (176.02 km^{2})
  - Land: 64.58 sq mi (167.25 km^{2})
  - Water: 3.39 sq mi (8.77 km^{2})

Population (2020)
  - Total: 19,038
  - Density: 294.82/sq mi (113.83/km^{2})
- Demonym: Saugertiesian
- Time zone: UTC−5 (EST)
  - Summer (DST): UTC−4 (EDT)
- ZIP Code: 12477
- Area code: 845
- FIPS code: 36-111-65299
- Website: saugertiesny.gov

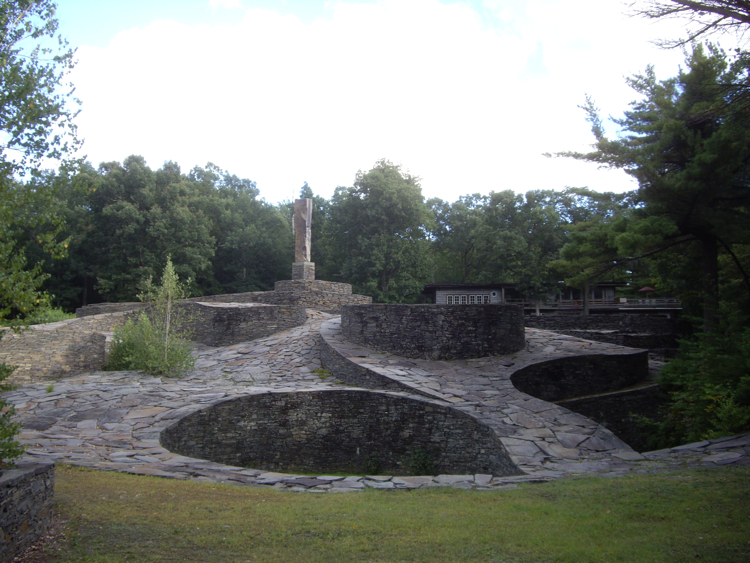
Opus 40, a 6.5-acre (2.6 ha) environmental sculpture in Saugerties created by sculptor Harvey Fite

Saugerties (/ˈsɔːɡərtiːz/) is a town in southeastern New York State, on the west bank of the Hudson River between Albany and New York City. It is in the northeastern corner of Ulster County. The population was 19,038 at the time of the 2020 census, a decline from 19,482 in 2010. The village of the same name is located entirely within the town.

Part of the town is inside Catskill Park. U.S. Route 9W and New York State Route 32 pass through the town, converging at the center of the village and overlapping to the south. These routes parallel the New York State Thruway (Interstate 87), which passes through the town just west of the village of Saugerties.

== History ==
In the 1650s, Barent Cornelis Volge operated a sawmill on the Sawyer's Kill, supplying lumber for the manor of Rensselaerswick. He had secured a title from the Esopus Sachem to this land sometime before 1663. Volge likely left the area at the outbreak of the first Esopus War in 1658. The "footpath to Albany" was not laid out until 1670. In April 1677, Governor Edmund Andros purchased land from the Esopus Indian Kaelcop, chief of the Amorgarickakan band, for the price of a piece of cloth, a blanket, some coarse fiber, a loaf of bread, and a shirt. The Mynderse House was built by John Persen, formerly of Kingston, an early mill owner, circa 1685.

In October 1710, three hundred families who had immigrated to England from the Palatine region of Germany established camps on the east and west side of the Hudson. The camp on the west side of the river became known as West Camp in the Town of Saugerties. They were sent by the British government to manufacture naval stores for Her Majesty's fleet. The villages at West Camp were called Elizabethtown, Georgetown, and Newtown. Sawmills were established on the Esopus Creek. In 1998, a monument commemorating their arrival was erected on the lawn of St. Paul's Lutheran Church in West Camp.

Sometime before 1730, the Katsbaan area northeast of the village was settled by Dutch farmers from Kingston and Palatines from the "Camps". In 1732, they built a stone Dutch Reformed Church.

During the American Revolution, a British Squadron laid anchor at Saugerties from October 18–22, 1777, while raiding parties burned Clermont and Belvedere, across the Hudson River. These were the estates of Margaret Beekman Livingston and her son, Chancellor Livingston. The British also burned sloops near the Esopus Creek, and several homes and barns. While here, British General Vaughan learned of Burgoyne's surrender at Saratoga on October 17. On October 22, 1777, the British fleet left the Mid-Hudson Valley, never to return.

The town was organized from the town of Kingston on April 5, 1811. At that time the hamlet of Saugerties contained twenty-one houses.

Henry Barclay (1778–1851), was an importer from Manhattan who, with his wife Catherine (1782–1851), came to Saugerties about 1825. Barclay, who had business relationships with Robert L. Livingston, had a dam constructed on the Esopus Creek near today's 9W bridge. Circa 1828, he established the Ulster Iron Works to produce bar and hoop iron. It had a capacity for manufacturing about 6,000 tons annually. and employed approximately 300 hands working round the clock shifts. At the same time he was building the iron mill, Henry Barclay built a paper mill powered by water from the Esopus Creek, which at that location had a fall of thirty-one feet. This mill was operational by 1827. Barclay imported skilled workers and engineers from England to man his mills.

Upon Barclay's death in 1851, the mill was under the management of Messrs Norman White and Joseph B. Sheffield. This firm would eventually purchase the mill in 1857 and later absolve into the long-standing company J. B. Sheffield & Son. The original mill was first rebuilt in 1860 by Messrs. White & Sheffield, and again rebuilt in 1868–1869. In 1872, the mill burned and was once more rebuilt. By 1877, a second mill was built adjoining the older section. The mills produced two and one-half tons of paper daily, and employed about 130 people. The mills would operate through various companies until 1969, then after years of abandonment and structural decay were demolished in the late 1970s. William R. Sheffield the son of J. B. Sheffield built the Clovelea mansion around 1880. In 1888, Martin Cantine built a paper mill on the North side of the dam. Cantine's mill would produce coated papers, similar to what one would find in older magazines. The Cantine mill closed in 1975, and burned in 1978. Part of the Sheffield mill complex, formerly a blank book bindery and envelope factory, has been renovated as senior citizen housing.

The village was incorporated in 1831 as "Ulster," and changed its name to "Saugerties" in 1855.

In 1832, blue stone was quarried in nearby Toodlum (now Veteran). At one time, 2,000 men were employed in quarrying, dressing and shipping about one and a half million dollars' worth of blue stone annually from Glasco, Malden, and Saugerties. Blue stone was used for curbing, paving, door sills, and window sills: much of it in New York City. The Ulster White Lead Company at Glenerie produced nine hundred tons of lead each year.

By 1870, the population of the town of Saugerties was about 4000.

The ice industry thrived during the 1880s to 1900s. Icehouses were located in Glasco and Malden. Ice was also harvested on the Upper Esopus and on the Sawyerkill. The brick industry also began in Glasco.

In the early hours of November 9, 1879, the steamer Ansonia of the Saugerties Line ran against the Lighthouse dock on its return trip from New York, smashing the paddle wheel. A tug from Kingston hauled the steamer off the flats, and it was taken to New York City for repairs. In 1889 Robert A. Snyder, John and George Seaman, Henry L. Finger, and James and William Maxwell started the "Saugerties and New York Steamboat Company". In 1892, the steamboats M. Martin and Tremper arrived at Saugerties at the same time, and collided near the lighthouse as each tried to get to the dock first. In 1903, the steamboat Saugerties burned to the waterline, and the charred remains were scuttled in the cove north of the lighthouse. The remains were still visible at very low tides in 2014.

In 1908, the Orpheum Theater was built by John Cooper Davis. It was a center for movies, basketball, vaudeville acts and roller skating. Lucille Ball, and Burns and Allen performed at the Orpheum.

In 1906, Poultney Bigelow, editor and co-owner of the New York Evening Post, built Bigelow Hall in Malden. In April 1910, the Esopus Creek flooded the village of Saugerties.

In 1930, cornetist, trumpeter and conductor Ernest S. Williams founded the Ernest S. Williams School of Music at Pine Grove. Williams was a prodigious teacher, with many of his students going on to be soloists and first chair players. In fact, in the late 1940s and early 1950s, the principal trumpet/solo chair of nearly every major symphony orchestra and concert band in The United States was held by a Williams student.

The 1939 film It's a Wonderful World has scenes that are supposed to be set in Saugerties.

The Band began to create their distinctive sound during 1967 when they improvised and recorded with Bob Dylan a huge number of cover songs and original Dylan material in the basement of a pink house in West Saugerties, New York, located at 56 Parnassus Lane (formerly 2188 Stoll Road). The house was built by Ottmar Gramms, who bought the land in 1952. The house was newly built when Rick Danko found it as a rental. Danko moved in along with Garth Hudson and Richard Manuel in February 1967. The house became known locally as "Big Pink" for its pink siding. The house was sold by Gramms in 1977, and since 1998 it has been a private residence.

Though widely bootlegged at the time, the recordings Dylan and the Band made were first officially released in 1975 on The Basement Tapes, and then released in their totality in 2014 on The Basement Tapes Complete. By the end of 1967 the Band felt it was time to step out of Dylan's shadow and make their own statement.

The Hudson Valley Garlic Festival was established in 1989 by Pat Reppert of Shale Hill Farm and Herb Gardens. In 1992, the Kiwanis Club of Saugerties took over sponsorship of the festival and moved it to Cantine Field where the festival is held on the last full weekend of every September. It attracts about 50,000 people during the two-day weekend.

In 1994, Saugerties was the home of the Woodstock '94 music festival, held on the 25th anniversary of the original Woodstock Festival. Saugerties is just 9 miles (14 km) east of the town of Woodstock, New York. The original festival was held some 46 miles (74 km) west-southwest of the town of Woodstock (on Max Yasgur's farm in Bethel, New York), while the 1999 festival in Rome, NY was 106 miles (171 km) away from Woodstock.

HITS ("Horseshows in the Sun"), opened in 2003. They occupy 200 acres (0.81 km^{2}) of land and have a 10-ring, Olympic-sized horse show facility in central Saugerties.

In 2005, the Esopus Bend Conservancy formed and acquired over 150 acres (0.61 km^{2}) with a little more than 2 miles (3.2 km) of the shoreline on the upper Esopus

In 2014, Saugerties was home to the Hudson Music Project, which notoriously became known as the "Mudson Project". After two days of music and other festivities, the festival came to an abrupt halt on the third and final day as rain and mud overcame the concert and camp areas. Hundreds were left without food and water when their cars became stuck in the muck that dominated the camp ground. When the rain subsided, many campers stayed and continued to party through the night.

=== St. John the Evangelist ===
Catholic laborers, principally quarrymen of Fish Creek, also known as "The Clove", were accustomed to go on Sundays to St. Mary of the Snow, in the village, for Mass, and sometimes disorders ensued. At that time the Saugerties congregation was served by Father Michael Gilbride, pastor in Hudson. Mr. Russell, owner of the quarries offered Gilbride land for a church, and St. John the Evangelist was established.

Rev. Michael C. Power, pastor of St. Mary of the Snow from 1852 to 1878, built a church in Quarryville. Rev. Michael Haran, of St. Joseph's in Kingston, was named pastor in 1886. He worked in Quarryville for seventeen years, also serving a mission in Shokan.

== Geography ==
The town has a total area of 68.0 square miles (176.2 km^{2}), of which 64.5 square miles (167.2 km^{2}) is land and 3.5 square miles (9.0 km^{2}) (5.13%) is water (United States Census Bureau statistics). The northern town line is the border of Greene County, New York, and the eastern town line, marked by the Hudson River, is the border of Dutchess and Columbia counties. Esopus Creek enters the Hudson River south of Saugerties village.

In 2016, a Kingston Creative study of social media data found that the Catskill Animal Sanctuary, Opus 40, and HITS were leading drivers of tourism, by virtue of mentions on Instagram.

=== Communities and locations in the town of Saugerties ===
- Asbury – A hamlet near the northern town line, bordering the town of Catskill.
- Barclay Heights – A location in the southern side of the village on Route 9W.
- Blue Mountain – A hamlet in the western part of the town.
- Canoe Hill – A hamlet north of Saugerties village.
- Centerville – A hamlet west of Veteran (aka Toodlum).
- Eavesport – A hamlet on Route 9W, north of Saugerties village.
- Fishcreek – A hamlet southwest of Saugerties village, over the Plattekill.
- Flatbush – A hamlet in the southeastern corner of the town.
- Glasco – A hamlet in the southeastern section of the town, by the Hudson River.
- Glenerie – A hamlet in the southeastern part of the town on Route 9W.
- High Woods – A hamlet in the southwestern part of the town, south of Fish Creek and West of Mount Marion.
- Katsbaan – A hamlet northwest of Saugerties village, located on County Route 34.
- Malden-on-Hudson – A hamlet by the Hudson River, north of Saugerties village.
- Manorville – a hamlet north of West Saugerties and south of the Greene county hamlet of Palenville
- Mount Marion – A location in the southeastern part of the town.
- Mount Marion Park – A hamlet west of Glasco.
- Quarryville – A hamlet west of Katsbaan on Route 32.
- Petersons Corner – A location south of Fish Creek.
- Pine Grove – A location west of Centerville.
- Saxton – A hamlet in the northwestern corner of the town on Route 32.
- Saugerties – the village is located in the eastern part of the town on Route 9W.
- Saugerties South – A hamlet south of Saugerties village. Commonly known as Barclay Heights.
- Shultis Corners – A hamlet in the southwestern section of the town at the intersection of Glasco Turnpike and State Route 212.
- Veteran (aka Toodlum) – A hamlet west of Saugerties village.
- West Camp – A hamlet on Route 9W, north of Eavesport.
- West Saugerties – A hamlet near the western town line, west of Blue Mountain, near Platte Clove.

== Demographics ==
Historical population
Census	Pop.	Note	%±
1820	2,699		—
1830	3,750		38.9%
1840	6,216		65.8%
1850	8,307		33.6%
1860	9,537		14.8%
1870	10,455		9.6%
1880	10,375		−0.8%
1890	10,436		0.6%
1900	9,754		−6.5%
1910	9,632		−1.3%
1920	8,245		−14.4%
1930	8,752		6.1%
1940	8,960		2.4%
1950	9,232		3.0%
1960	13,608		47.4%
1970	16,961		24.6%
1980	17,975		6.0%
1990	18,467		2.7%
2000	18,821		1.9%
2010	19,482		3.5%
2020	19,038		−2.3%
U.S. Decennial Census

As of the 2010 census, there were 19,482 people; 8,163 households and 5,193 families residing in the town. The racial makeup of the town was 94.2% White, 1.7% Black or African American, .03% Native American, 1.1% Asian, .87% Pacific Islander (U.S. census), and 2.10% from two or more races. Hispanic or Latino of any race were 5% of the population.

Of the 8,163 households, 26.7% had children under the age of 18 living with them, 47.9% were married couples living together, 10.8% had a female householder with no husband present, and 36.4% were non-families. Of all households, 29.3% were made up of individuals, and 29.3% had someone living alone who was 65 years of age or older. The average household size was 2.37 and the average family size was 2.92. In the town, the median age was 42.9 years; 7.3% are over 65.

== Education ==
Saugerties Central School District, including Saugerties High School, is the public school district covering all of the town.

The Roman Catholic Archdiocese of New York operates Catholic schools in Ulster County. St. Mary of the Snow School in Saugerties closed in 2013.

== Historic places ==
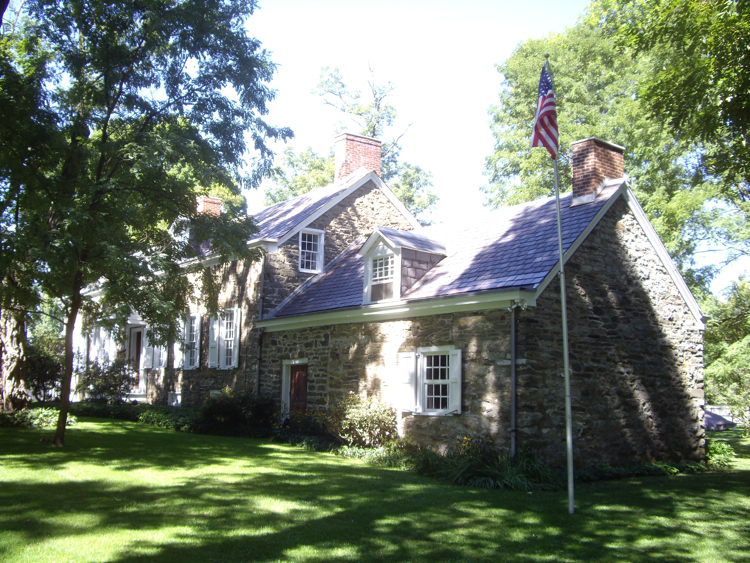
Dubois-Kierstede Stone House (1727)

- Augusta Savage House and Studio
- Big Pink
- Dubois-Kierstede Stone House: built in 1727, it is now the Kiersted House Museum.
- Loerzel Beer Hall
- Main-Partition Streets Historic District
- Osterhoudt Stone House
- Opus 40: a dry stone environmental sculpture created by Harvey Fite.
- Saugerties Lighthouse
- Trinity Episcopal Church: consecrated on June 13, 1833, the window behind the altar is by William Morris.
- Trumpbour Homestead Farm
- Wynkoop House: was built by descendants of Dutch settlers around 1740

=== Saugerties lighthouse ===
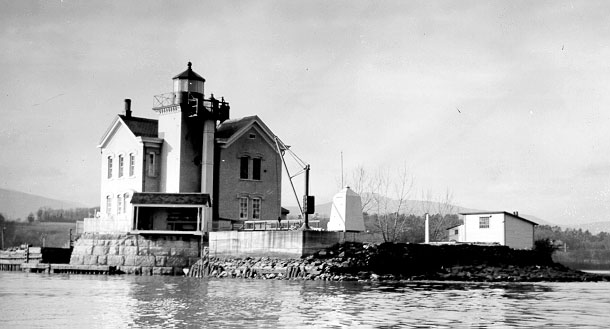
Saugerties lighthouse (1867)

Construction began on the original lighthouse in 1835 to guide ships away from shallows and into Esopus Creek. It was built on a pier made of chestnut cribbing filled with stone. The original source of light came from five whale-oil lamps with parabolic reflectors. It burned down in 1848. It was rebuilt by 1850, with four mineral-oil lamps, replacing the whale oil lamps.

In 1867, Congress appropriated $25,000 for the construction of a new lighthouse. It was built on a circular stone base, 60 feet (18 m) in diameter. The mineral-oil lamps from the original lighthouse were moved to the new building. Two years later in 1869, the newly built lighthouse became functional. In 1873, a lantern room made out of cast-iron was installed with an iron-plate walkway that wrapped around for cleaning the outside panels of glass.

In 1888, Saugerties harbor was dredged to improve access to the Esopus Creek. A small jetty was constructed from the fill linking the lighthouse to the mainland.

In 1909, a fog bell was installed in the lighthouse. In the late 1940s, telephone, electricity and steam heat were added. In 1954, the automation of light made light keepers unnecessary so the Coast Guard closed the lighthouse. The Saugerties Lighthouse Conservancy was established in 1985 with the mission to restore and maintain the lighthouse. After extensive restoration, it was recommissioned by the Coast Guard as an aid to navigation. The foundation for the original lighthouse remains as a small islet adjacent to the existing lighthouse.

== Notable people ==
- Adam Adamowicz (1968–2012), video game concept artist, worked on Fallout 3 and The Elder Scrolls V: Skyrim at Bethesda Softworks.
- The Band resided in a house known as "Big Pink" in West Saugerties while recording The Basement Tapes (with Bob Dylan) in 1967. Their debut album, Music From Big Pink was recorded in New York City and Los Angeles.
- Leon Barritt (1852–1938), illustrator, cartoonist, journalist, and amateur astronomer
- Dennis Bermudez, American mixed martial artist (native)
- Roger Donlon, first Medal of Honor recipient of the Vietnam War, and the first Green Beret to receive the award. The auditorium in the Village Hall municipal building on Partition Street and the Town Hall on High Street in Saugerties were renamed in Roger Donlon's honor. He died January 25, 2024.
- Darnell Edge (born 1997), basketball player in the Israeli Basketball Premier League
- Jimmy Fallon, host of NBC's Tonight Show since 2014, grew up in Saugerties from age two (born in Bay Ridge, Brooklyn).
- Irving Fisher (1867–1947), economist
- Harvey Fite (1903–1976), sculptor, painter, and teacher, who built Opus 40
- Dorothy Frooks (1896–1997), author
- Tom Hallion, Major League Baseball umpire (native, now resides in Kentucky)
- Frank Hannigan (1931–2014), former executive director of the United States Golf Association (native and resident)
- John Henson (1965–2014), Muppets performer and son of Jim Henson
- Maurice Hinchey, United States congressman
- K. Leroy Irvis (1919–2006), African-American politician in Pennsylvania
- Julia Searing Leaycraft (1885–1960), artist and editor
- Linda Montano, performance artist (native)
- Glenford Myers, computer scientist, entrepreneur, and author
- Anton Myrer (1922–1996), United States Marine Corps veteran, author of war novel Once An Eagle (resident)
- Robert M. Place, American artist and Tarot scholar (resident)
- Jeremiah Russell (1786–1867), U.S. representative from New York
- Augusta Savage (1892–1962), African-American sculptor associated with the Harlem Renaissance (resident)
- Patricia Schartle Myrer (1923–2010), editor, literary agent, publishing executive, former principal at McIntosh & Otis literary agency (resident)
- Joe Sinnott, Marvel Comics artist; Sinnott illustrated the Treasure Chest educational comic book series.
- Gilbert R. Spalding (1812–1880), showman and circus owner, lived and died here
- John Thorn, author, columnist, and baseball historian (now resides in Catskill)
- Jay Ungar and Molly Mason, American folk musicians and composers (residents)
- Margaret E. Winslow (1836–1936), activist, editor, author
