= West Camp, New York =

- Hamlet
- Location within New York Location within the United States
- Coordinates: 42°07′23″N 73°56′05″W
- Country: United States
- State: New York
- County: Ulster
- Town: Saugerties
- Elevation: 184 ft (56 m)
- Time zone: UTC-5 (Eastern (EST))
  - Summer (DST): UTC-4 (EDT)
- ZIP code: 12490
- Area code: 845
- GNIS feature ID: 969160

West Camp is a hamlet in the Town of Saugerties, Ulster County, New York, United States. The community is located along U.S. Route 9W, 3.3 miles (5.3 km) north of the village of Saugerties. West Camp has a post office with ZIP code 12490.
