= Leaycraft =

Leaycraft is a surname. Notable people with the surname include:

- Donni Leaycraft (born 1968), American tennis player
- Julia Searing Leaycraft (1885–1960), American artist
