= Saugerties South, New York =

- CDP
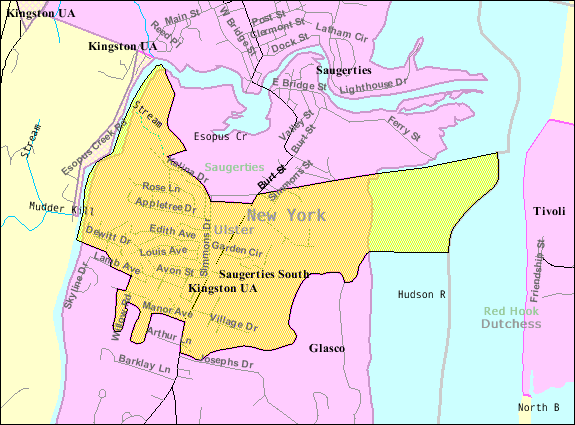
- U.S. Census reference map

- Location in Ulster County and the state of New York.
- Coordinates: 42°3′34″N 73°57′22″W
- Country: United States
- State: New York
- County: Ulster

Area
  - Total: 1.29 sq mi (3.34 km^{2})
  - Land: 1.07 sq mi (2.76 km^{2})
  - Water: 0.22 sq mi (0.58 km^{2})

Population (2020)
  - Total: 2,442
  - Density: 2,290.6/sq mi (884.39/km^{2})
- Time zone: UTC-5 (EST)
  - Summer (DST): UTC-4 (EDT)
- FIPS code: 36-65310

Saugerties South is a hamlet (and census-designated place) in Ulster County, New York, United States. The population was 2,442 at the 2020 census.

Saugerties South is a community south of the Village of Saugerties and Esopus Creek in the Town of Saugerties. U.S. Route 9W passes through the community.

== Geography ==
Saugerties South, also known as Barclay Heights, is located at 42°3′34″N 73°57′22″W (42.059450, -73.955975).

According to the United States Census Bureau, the CDP has a total area of 1.2 square miles (3.1 km^{2}), of which 1.0 square miles (2.5 km^{2}) is land and 0.2 square mile (0.6 km^{2}) (19.83%) is water.

The community lies on the west bank of the Hudson River.

== Demographics ==
Historical population
Census	Pop.	Note	%±
2000	2,285		—
2010	2,218		−2.9%
2020	2,442		10.1%
U.S. Decennial Census

As of the census of 2000, there were 2,285 people, 865 households, and 642 families residing in the CDP. The population density was 2,339.9 inhabitants per square mile (903.4/km^{2}). There were 885 housing units at an average density of 906.3 per square mile (349.9/km^{2}). The racial makeup of the CDP was 96.06% White, 1.44% African American, 0.09% Native American, 0.79% Asian, 0.35% from other races, and 1.27% from two or more races. Hispanic or Latino of any race were 2.76% of the population.

There were 865 households, out of which 35.5% had children under the age of 18 living with them, 60.5% were married couples living together, 10.1% had a female householder with no husband present, and 25.7% were non-families. 23.2% of all households were made up of individuals, and 12.5% had someone living alone who was 65 years of age or older. The average household size was 2.62 and the average family size was 3.07.

In the CDP, the population was spread out, with 25.8% under the age of 18, 5.4% from 18 to 24, 28.6% from 25 to 44, 24.2% from 45 to 64, and 16.1% who were 65 years of age or older. The median age was 39 years. For every 100 females, there were 90.4 males. For every 100 females age 18 and over, there were 85.2 males.

The median income for a household in the CDP was $52,468, and the median income for a family was $60,212. Males had a median income of $42,639 versus $27,155 for females. The per capita income for the CDP was $22,197. About 5.4% of families and 7.0% of the population were below the poverty line, including 11.9% of those under age 18 and 2.4% of those age 65 or over.

== Education ==
The CDP is in Saugerties Central School District. Saugerties High School is the zoned comprehensive high school.
