= St. Mary of the Snow - St. Joseph Church (Saugerties, New York) =

Roman Catholic parish church

The Church of St. Mary of the Snow is a Roman Catholic parish church under the authority of the Roman Catholic Archdiocese of New York, located in Saugerties, Ulster County, New York.

== History ==
The first priest to attend Catholics in Ulster County along the river was Rev. Arthur Langdill who was stationed in Newburgh 1817–1818. Saugerties was the first place in Ulster to warrant the erection of a church. They were mainly Irish seeking work in the iron works, paper mills, and stone quarries. In 1830 Rev. Philip O'Reilly O.P., from County Cavan, Ireland, was sent by Bishop John Dubois to establish missions and build churches along the Hudson wherever there were sufficient resident Catholics. O'Reilly visited the village of Saugerties in 1832 about one Sunday a month, holding services in private homes. The church cornerstone was laid in 1833. O'Reilly was said to be a man of large and powerful build and commanding presence. At this time he was also serving congregations in Rondoubt, Newburgh, and Poughkeepsie. The church at Saugerties was dedicated in 1843.

The Cemetery grew from the first graves around the church in 1833 to fill much of the church property now occupied. In 1915, nine acres in Barclay Heights were purchased for a new cemetery.

In 1837 Rev. Patrick Duffy became pastor of Our Lady of Loretto in Cold Spring and took over the missions in Newburgh, Poughkeepsie, and Saugerties. The first baptisms in Saugerties took place in May 1837. The same year Duffy was appointed pastor in Newburgh, at which time Rondout and Saugerties became mission stations of St. Peter's in Poughkeepsie. When St. Mary's in Rondout became a parish, Saugerties came under its jurisdiction. In 1847 the Diocese of Albany was established with the line of division falling between Rondout and Saugerties. Saugerties then came for a time under the care of Michael Gilbride, Pastor at Hudson.

Rev. Michael C. Power served as pastor at Saugerties from 1852 to 1878. Power established a mission in Quarryville. During his tenure it was not uncommon to find one hundred men led by their foreman, marching eight to ten miles to attend Mass. The local authorities came recognize the value of the priests in settling disputes among the laborers, who were for the most part without families and living in barracks around the quarries and mills. Henry Barclay, of the Ulster Iron Works, was a major contributor to the church for his workers. The basement of the church served as a stop on the Underground Railroad.

The steeple was added c. 1863 with its massive bell tower, inscribed “Jones & Co., Founders, Troy, NY”. (In 1878 Father Power retired to Wappingers Falls where he assisted a classmate, Fr. Denis Sheehan. Father Power served as a missionary priest to families in Stoneco and Sylvan Lake. Power owned a tract of land on West Main Street just south of the Wappingers Rural Cemetery. This land, known as Power's Park, was enclosed by a board fence and contained a grandstand from which spectators could watch bicycle races which were run on a 1/4 mile track. This park was also the home field of the Wappingers Monitors baseball team and was the site of some of “Big Dan” Brouthers’ most memorable hits.)

Father Power was followed by Denis Paul O'Flynn as pastor. In 1892 the church was seriously damaged by fire, but repaired and renovated by Father O'Flynn. The church features a high steeple, traditional stained glass windows, including a Tiffany window depicting the Virgin Mary at the Assumption. O’Flynn also built the original rectory in 1879 which became the sisters convent/school in 1881. The church was restored again in 1989 following a March 26 Easter Sunday fire.

In August 2015, St. Joseph's Church, Glasco merged with St. Mary of the Snow into one parish with two campuses.

== School ==
St. Mary of the Snow School

Location
- 25 Cedar Street; Saugerties, New York 12477; 42°4′38.53″N 73°56′50.14″W

St. Mary of the Snow was a Catholic elementary school located in Saugerties, New York, which had students enrolled in pre-school through eighth grades from all Hudson Valley, Saugerties, Kingston, Catskills and Onteora districts who sought a Catholic education. The school was founded in 1881 by the Sisters of Charity and was closed on June 20, 2013, by the Archdiocese of New York during its consolidation of education programs due to decreased enrollment and increased cost of programs. Jimmy Fallon, host of The Tonight Show, attended the school while growing up. The building is currently used for parish religious education program.

== St. Joseph's, Glasco ==
Glasco takes its name from a glass company located in the mountain area several miles inland. The glass was carried by horse down the "Glasco Turnpike" to the banks of the Hudson where it was shipped on to ports for sale. The settlement along the river where the glass was loaded became known as Glasco. Settled largely by unskilled workers, first from Ireland and then from Italy, they came to the area in great numbers in the late 19th century by ferry after landing in New York City. They tended to live in company housing on the banks of the river. At one point, the town boasted over six brick factories, a ferry service, a school, churches and several saloons.

St. Joseph's Church was established around 1886 as a mission church of St. Mary of the Snow. By the end of the nineteenth and into the early twentieth century, Glasco had become predominantly settled by Italian-Americans. To better minister to the needs of the faithful, another St. Mary's resident priest, Rev. Henry Newey, was assigned to St. Joseph's Mission. Rev. Newey had been educated in Rome and was able to converse in Italian with the parishioners.

In 1917 Father James A. Talbot, pastor of St. Mary of the Snow purchased and converted a former a Dutch Reformed Church to accommodate the growing parish. In response to parishioners' requests in July 1919, Archbishop Hayes directed pastor of St. Mary's, Father Joseph G. Cushman, to send a priest fluent in Italian to reside in Glasco and Father Matthew DiOrio became the first resident pastor of the parish.
