= Beer hall =

Large drinking establishment, German origin

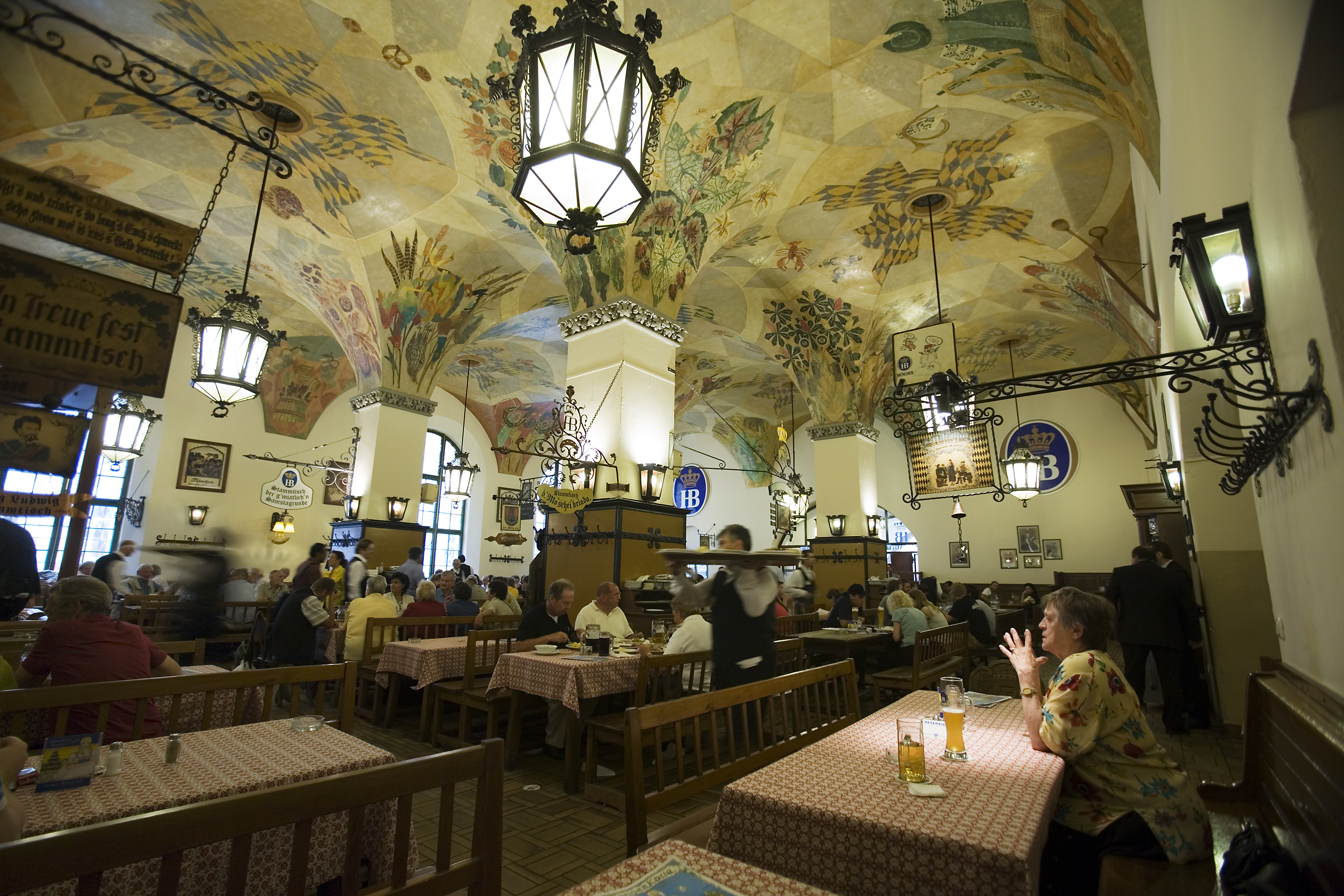
Hofbräuhaus am Platzl beer hall in Munich, Germany

A beer hall (German: Bierpalast, Bierhalle) is a large pub that specializes in beer.

== Germany ==
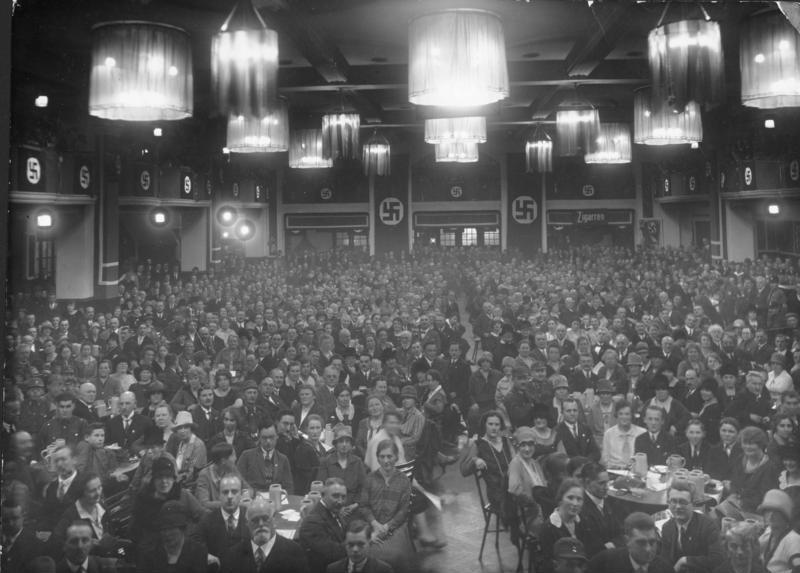
A meeting of the Nazi Party at the Bürgerbräukeller beer hall, Munich, circa 1923

Beer halls are a traditional part of Bavarian culture and feature prominently in Oktoberfest. Bosch notes that the beer halls of Oktoberfest, known in German as Festzelte (festival tents), are more accurately referred to as "beer tents", as they are temporary structures built in the open air. Across Munich, the various Festzelte at Oktoberfest can accommodate over 100,000 people collectively.

Bavaria's capital Munich is the city most associated with beer halls; almost every brewery in Munich operates a beer hall. The largest beer hall, the 5,000-seat Mathäser, (Note: "The Mathäser billed itself as "the largest beer hall in the world" with over 7000 seats") near the Munich central station, has been converted into a movie theater.

The Bürgerbräukeller in Munich lent its name to the 1923 Beer Hall Putsch, an attempted Nazi coup led by Adolf Hitler.

== United States ==
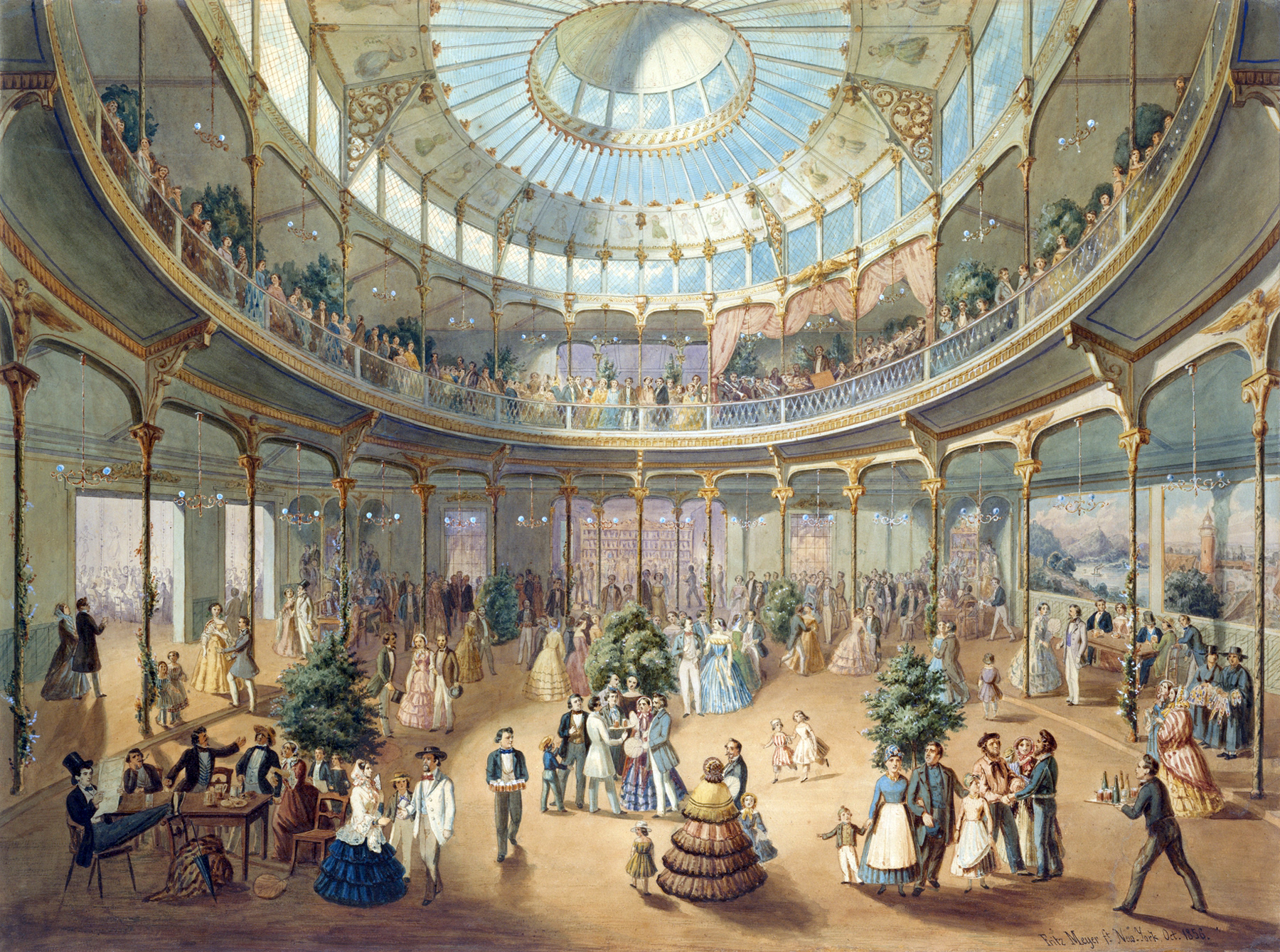
German Winter Garden, New York, 1856

American beer halls became popular in the mid-19th century, following a wave of immigration from Germany to the United States. They became an alternative to the American-style tavern.

St. Louis, Missouri is home to a number of beer halls, some of which seat several hundred persons. Hofbräuhaus has eight franchised beer halls in the United States.

The Loerzel Beer Hall was built around 1873 in Saugerties, Ulster County, New York, and was added to the U.S. National Register of Historic Places in 2000. It is currently an apartment building.

German brewers who immigrated to Milwaukee, Wisconsin built "hundreds of distinctive taverns and beer halls", and also built and established large outdoor beer gardens.

== See also ==
- Beer Hall Boycott – a female-led national campaign in South Africa of boycotting municipal beer halls
- Brewpub
- Hofbräuhaus
- List of public house topics
- Ratskeller
