= Katsbaan, New York =

Coordinates: 42°06′39″N 73°58′06″W

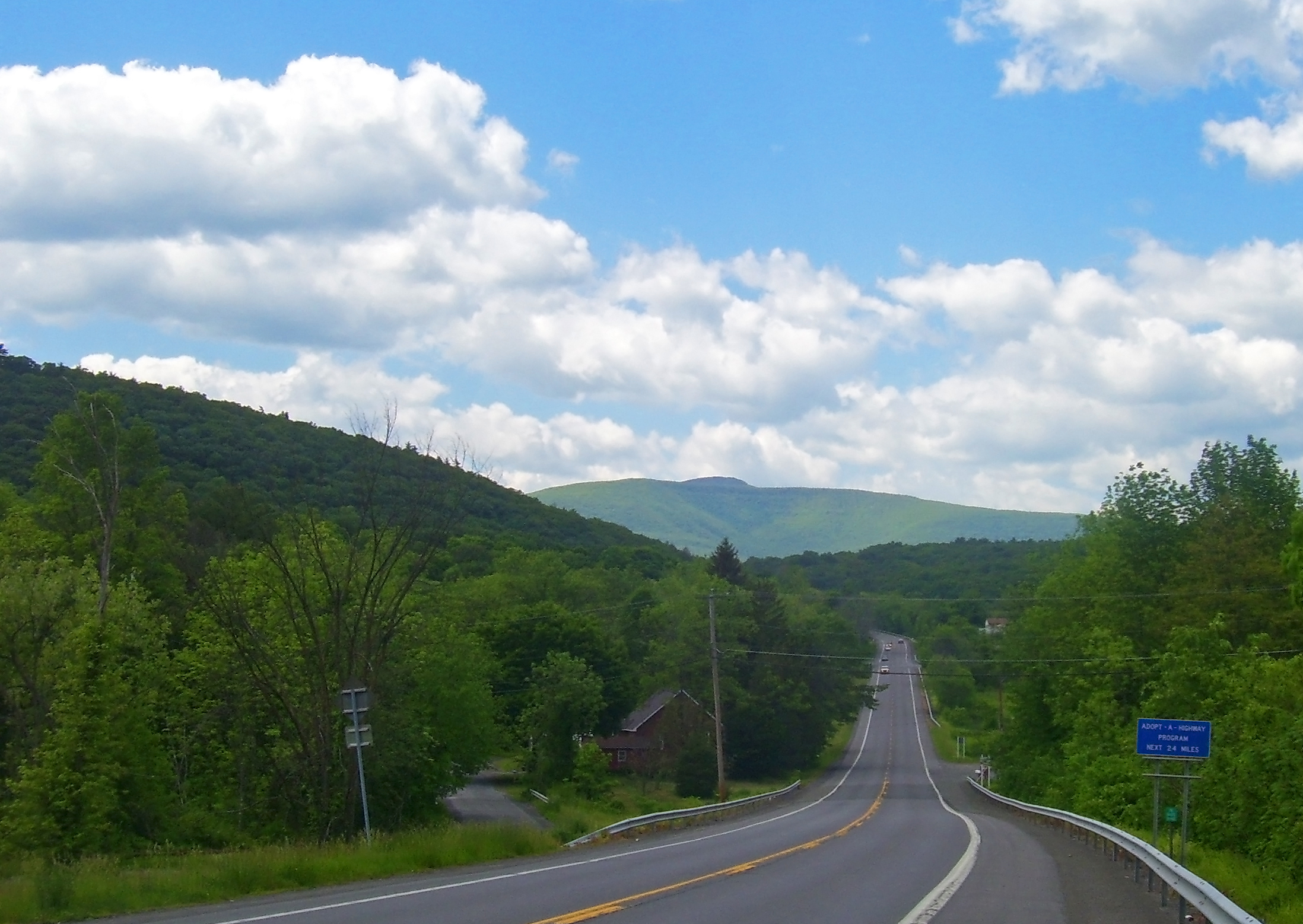
View of Catskill Escarpment up New York State Route 32 from Katsbaan

Katsbaan is a hamlet of the town of Saugerties in Ulster County, New York, United States, located north of the village of Saugerties and south of Catskill.

The hamlet existed at least as far back as the American Revolution. The origin of the name, kaatsbaan, which means "tennis court", is linked to the original Dutch visitors to the area who saw lacrosse being played by native Iroquois which they thought resembled tennis. The hamlet's name is also at the origin of the name of the Catskill mountains. Note that Katsbaan is originally spelled Kaatsbaan (e.g. on the other side of the Hudson, in Tivoli NY, is a 'Kaatsbaan'). The Dutch double vowel didn't always survive in English (see Haarlem - Harlem). In Dutch, players on a 'kaatsbaan' are 'kaatsers'. North of Katsbaan is a stream (Dutch: 'kill') originally called Kaatsers kill, currently Kaaterskill Creek. Thus the creek gave its name to the mountains where it originated.

The hamlet was settled by Dutch farmers and German Palatines prior to 1730, and was deeded to the Dutch Reformed Church by 1732. A stone church that was constructed at that time was used as a landmark on Colonial American maps, and still stands today.
