= Dior Johnson =

American basketball player (born 2004)

No. 1 – UCF Knights
- Position: Point guard
- Conference: Big 12 Conference

Personal information
- Born: January 28, 2004 (age 22) Kingston, New York, U.S.
- Listed height: 6 ft 3 in (1.91 m)
- Listed weight: 185 lb (84 kg)

Career information
- High school: IMG Academy (Bradenton, Florida); Saugerties (Saugerties, New York); Mayfair (Lakewood, California); Oak Hill Academy (Mouth of Wilson, Virginia); Prolific Prep (Napa, California); SoCal Academy (Castaic, California)
- College: Clarendon (2023–2024); UCF (2024–2025); Tarleton State (2025–2026); UCF (2026–present)

Career highlights
- WAC Sixth Man of the Year (2026); Second-team All-WAC (2026)

Dior Johnson (born January 28, 2004) is an American college basketball player for the UCF Knights of the Big 12 Conference. He previously played for the Clarendon Bulldogs and Tarleton State Texans.

== Early life and high school career ==
Johnson was born in Kingston, New York. Dior was raised by his single mother and his grandparents.

Throughout his high school career, Johnson played for 9 high schools in 5 different states. Johnson started his high school career competing for his hometown Saugerties High School as a 7th and 8th grader. He broke the New York boys basketball state record for the youngest player to reach 1,000 points. After briefly attending IMG Academy in Bradenton, Florida, during his freshman year, Johnson returned home to play for Saugerties after sustaining an injury. Later on during his freshman season, he would again transfer to Findlay Prep in Henderson, Nevada. However, Findlay Prep's basketball program closed, leaving Johnson to transfer to Hillcrest Prep High School in Arizona. He eventually left Hillcrest before his sophomore season began, and was expected to play his sophomore season at Fairfax High School in Los Angeles, but ended up enrolling at Mayfair High School in Lakewood, California. For his junior season, Johnson transferred to Oak Hill Academy in Mouth of Wilson, Virginia, but left the school after sustaining a leg injury. He then returned to California, where he attended Centennial High School in Corona, but did not play basketball. As a senior, Johnson initially attended Prolific Prep in Napa, California, before transferring midway through the season to SoCal Academy in Castaic, California.

=== Recruiting ===
Johnson was a consensus four-star recruit and one of the top players in the 2022 class, according to major recruiting services. On February 7, 2020, he committed to playing college basketball for Syracuse before decommitting nine months later. On June 22, 2021, he committed to Oregon before decommitting a year later. On June 13, 2022, he committed to Pittsburgh.

College recruiting
| Name | Hometown | School | Height | Weight | Commit date |
|---|---|---|---|---|---|
| Dior Johnson; PG | Saugerties, NY | SoCal Academy (CA) | 6 ft 3 in (1.91 m) | 180 lb (82 kg) | Jun 13, 2022 |
| Dior Johnson; PG | Recruit ratings: Rivals: 247Sports: On3: ESPN: (88) | | | | |
Overall recruit ranking: Rivals: 42 247Sports: 53 On3: 90 ESPN: 38
Note: In many cases, Scout, Rivals, 247Sports, On3, and ESPN may conflict in their listings of height and weight.; In these cases, the average was taken. ESPN grades are on a 100-point scale.; Sources: "Pittsburgh 2022 Basketball Commitments". Rivals.; "2022 Pittsburgh Panthers Recruiting Class". ESPN.; "2022 Team Ranking". Rivals.

== College career ==
Johnson took a redshirt in the 2022–23 season. After being arrested and sentenced to probation, the University of Pittsburgh announced in August 2023 that Johnson was no longer enrolled. Shortly after, Johnson matriculated at Clarendon College, a community college in Texas. In one season with Clarendon, Johnson averaged 29.7 points, 5.4 rebounds, and 5.9 assists per game.

On July 1, 2024, Johnson, the top-rated JUCO transfer, announced his decision to transfer to the University of Central Florida to play for the UCF Knights.

In June 2025, Johnson transferred to Tarleton State University to play for the Tarleton State Texans. He averaged 24.0 points, 3.3 rebounds, 1.6 assists and 1.2 steals per game. Johnson was named to the Second Team All-WAC and WAC Sixth Man of the Year. Following the season he transferred back to UCF.

=== Arrest ===
Johnson pleaded guilty to two misdemeanor charges in December 2022 for simple assault and strangulation, stemming from a September 5 incident in the same year, where he struck a woman multiple times, causing bruising, and forcing her head into a bed, making it difficult for her to breathe. Johnson was suspended from Pittsburgh during this period but was reinstated after pleading guilty. Johnson was sentenced to a year of probation and required to complete batterer's intervention.

== Career statistics ==
Legend
| GP | Games played | GS | Games started | MPG | Minutes per game |
| FG% | Field goal percentage | 3P% | 3-point field goal percentage | FT% | Free throw percentage |
| RPG | Rebounds per game | APG | Assists per game | SPG | Steals per game |
| BPG | Blocks per game | PPG | Points per game | **Bold** | Career high |

=== College ===
==== NCAA Division I ====
| Year | Team | GP | GS | MPG | FG% | 3P% | FT% | RPG | APG | SPG | BPG | PPG |
|---|---|---|---|---|---|---|---|---|---|---|---|---|
| 2022–23 | Pittsburgh | Redshirt | | | | | | | | | | |
| 2024–25 | UCF | 35 | 0 | 8.5 | .459 | .304 | .900 | 1.0 | .8 | .3 | .0 | 2.9 |
| 2025–26 | Tarleton State | 20 | 2 | 26.4 | .518 | .538 | .849 | 3.3 | 1.6 | 1.2 | .1 | 24.0 |

==== NJCAA Division I ====
| Year | Team | GP | GS | MPG | FG% | 3P% | FT% | RPG | APG | SPG | BPG | PPG |
|---|---|---|---|---|---|---|---|---|---|---|---|---|
| 2023–24 | Clarendon | 21 | 20 | 35.7 | .521 | .417 | .856 | 5.4 | 5.9 | 2.2 | .1 | 29.7 |
