= Osterhoudt Stone House =

Historic house in New York, United States

- U.S. National Register of Historic Places
- Location within New York Location within the United States
- Location: 1880 NY 32, Saugerties, New York
- Coordinates: 42°1′3″N 73°57′32″W
- Area: 2 acres (0.81 ha)
- Built: 1818
- Architectural style: Federal
- NRHP reference No.: 01000717
- Added to NRHP: July 5, 2001

Osterhoudt Stone House is a historic home located at Saugerties in Ulster County, New York. It was built about 1818 and is a two-story, five by two bay limestone and brownstone building set on a coursed stone foundation and covered by a metal clad gable roof.

It was listed on the National Register of Historic Places in 2001.
