= Augusta Savage House and Studio =

Historic house in New York, United States

- U.S. National Register of Historic Places
- Location within New York Location within the United States
- Location: 189 Old Rte. 32, Saugerties, New York
- Coordinates: 42°6′45″N 73°58′36″W
- Area: 1.6 acres (0.65 ha)
- Built: 1945
- Architectural style: Greek Revival
- NRHP reference No.: 01000248
- Added to NRHP: March 21, 2001

Augusta Savage House and Studio is a historic home and sculpture studio located at Saugerties in Ulster County, New York, United States. The house is a simple mid-19th century two story, timber-frame gabled-el style Greek Revival dwelling. The sculpture studio is a small, single story, shed roofed building. The property was owned by sculptor Augusta Savage (1892–1962) from 1945 to 1962.

It was listed on the National Register of Historic Places in 2001.
