= Glasco, New York =

- CDP
- Location in Ulster County and the state of New York.
- Coordinates: 42°2′51″N 73°57′10″W
- Country: United States
- State: New York
- County: Ulster

Area
  - Total: 2.29 sq mi (5.92 km^{2})
  - Land: 1.62 sq mi (4.19 km^{2})
  - Water: 0.67 sq mi (1.74 km^{2})
- Elevation: 151 ft (46 m)

Population (2020)
  - Total: 2,013
  - Density: 1,245.3/sq mi (480.82/km^{2})
- Time zone: UTC-5 (EST)
  - Summer (DST): UTC-4 (EDT)
- ZIP code: 12432
- Area code: 845
- FIPS code: 36-29014
- GNIS feature ID: 0951155

Glasco is a hamlet (and census-designated place) in Ulster County, New York, United States. The population was 2,013 at the 2020 census.

Glasco is a community in the Town of Saugerties east of U.S. Route 9W. The community is north of Kingston.

== Geography ==
Glasco is located at 42°2′51″N 73°57′10″W (42.047539, -73.952860).

According to the United States Census Bureau, the CDP has a total area of 2.6 square miles (6.7 km^{2}), of which, 1.9 square miles (4.9 km^{2}) of it is land and 0.8 square miles (2.1 km^{2}) of it (29.92%) is water.

Glasco is on the west bank of the Hudson River.

== History ==
Glasco's name was taken from a glass company located in the mountain area several miles inland. The glass was carried by horse down the "Glasco Turnpike" to the banks of the Hudson where it was shipped on for ports of sale. The settlement along the river where the glass was loaded became known as Glasco.

Settled largely by unskilled workers, first from Ireland and then from Italy, they came to the area in great numbers in the late 19th century by ferry after landing in New York City. They tended to live in company housing on the banks of the river. At one point, the town boasted over six brick factories, a ferry service, a school, churches and several saloons. Bricks were sent down the Hudson River by barge to furnish the construction of America's cities. The Hudson River also played a role in other economic activities. Some entrepreneurial immigrants opened small businesses to service the community, such as harvesting ice from the Hudson River, which was stored in large ice houses along the banks of the river and sold in the summers to homes and businesses. Fishing was also a cottage industry among those not working in the brickyards. In the bluffs above the clay mining operations of the brickyards, small estates and dairy farms were established.

By the mid 20th century, the brick yards had all closed down. One family operator, Washburn, allegedly relocated to Virginia to continue brick making. Other brickyards were abandoned and simply vanished into the undergrown of trees and wildlife.

Recently, residents of New York City have begun to purchase weekend homes within the boundaries of Glasco. At the foot of the Catskill Mountains, and within walking distance of the Hudson River (relatively unpolluted at that point), the hamlet has seen real estate prices skyrocket since 2000, along with an increase in single-family home construction.

=== 2005 shooting ===
On February 13, 2005, Robert Bonelli, age 24, of Glasco, New York, entered the mall with a semi-automatic AK-47 Variant and began firing it in the mall's Best Buy shop. Panic ensued as employees and shoppers began to flee the mall. Bonelli moved into the mall's main corridor and continued firing his weapon until he ran out of ammunition. After emptying the assault rifle, he promptly dropped it. As Bonelli dropped the weapon, a mall employee grabbed his gun, and another tackled him. The mall was evacuated and Bonelli was taken into custody. No one was killed in the shooting, but two people, a 20-year-old National Guard recruiter and a 56-year-old male shopper, were wounded. After the incident, Ulster County investigators searched Bonelli's room at the home he shared with his father and found what Ulster County District Attorney Donald Williams described as "Columbine memorabilia". Officials described the young man as being fascinated by the Columbine High School massacre.

== Demographics ==
Historical population
Census	Pop.	Note	%±
2000	1,692		—
2010	2,099		24.1%
2020	2,013		−4.1%
U.S. Decennial Census

=== 2020 census ===
As of the 2020 census, Glasco had a population of 2,013. The median age was 43.7 years. 17.8% of residents were under the age of 18 and 20.6% of residents were 65 years of age or older. For every 100 females there were 87.1 males, and for every 100 females age 18 and over there were 82.1 males age 18 and over.

93.3% of residents lived in urban areas, while 6.7% lived in rural areas.

There were 901 households in Glasco, of which 26.7% had children under the age of 18 living in them. Of all households, 42.7% were married-couple households, 14.4% were households with a male householder and no spouse or partner present, and 36.0% were households with a female householder and no spouse or partner present. About 33.8% of all households were made up of individuals and 17.8% had someone living alone who was 65 years of age or older.

There were 934 housing units, of which 3.5% were vacant. The homeowner vacancy rate was 0.2% and the rental vacancy rate was 3.7%.

Racial composition as of the 2020 census
Race	Number	Percent
White	1,698	84.4%
Black or African American	60	3.0%
American Indian and Alaska Native	8	0.4%
Asian	43	2.1%
Native Hawaiian and Other Pacific Islander	0	0.0%
Some other race	56	2.8%
Two or more races	148	7.4%
Hispanic or Latino (of any race)	163	8.1%

=== 2000 census ===
As of the census of 2000, there were 1,692 people, 700 households, and 476 families residing in the CDP. The population density was 915.0 inhabitants per square mile (353.3/km^{2}). There were 726 housing units at an average density of 392.6 per square mile (151.6/km^{2}). The racial makeup of the CDP was 95.86% White, 1.48% African American, 0.06% Native American, 0.65% Asian, 0.35% from other races, and 1.60% from two or more races. Hispanic or Latino of any race were 1.89% of the population.

There were 700 households, out of which 29.6% had children under the age of 18 living with them, 51.7% were married couples living together, 11.6% had a female householder with no husband present, and 31.9% were non-families. 26.3% of all households were made up of individuals, and 10.7% had someone living alone who was 65 years of age or older. The average household size was 2.40 and the average family size was 2.91.

In the CDP, the population was spread out, with 23.1% under the age of 18, 5.7% from 18 to 24, 30.9% from 25 to 44, 22.6% from 45 to 64, and 17.6% who were 65 years of age or older. The median age was 39 years. For every 100 females, there were 90.5 males. For every 100 females age 18 and over, there were 88.6 males.

The median income for a household in the CDP was $37,917, and the median income for a family was $45,909. Males had a median income of $32,917 versus $23,696 for females. The per capita income for the CDP was $21,964. About 11.5% of families and 9.3% of the population were below the poverty line, including 17.1% of those under age 18 and 6.6% of those age 65 or over.

== Education ==
The CDP is in Saugerties Central School District. Saugerties High School is the zoned comprehensive high school.
