= Mathäser =

Historic beer hall and cinema

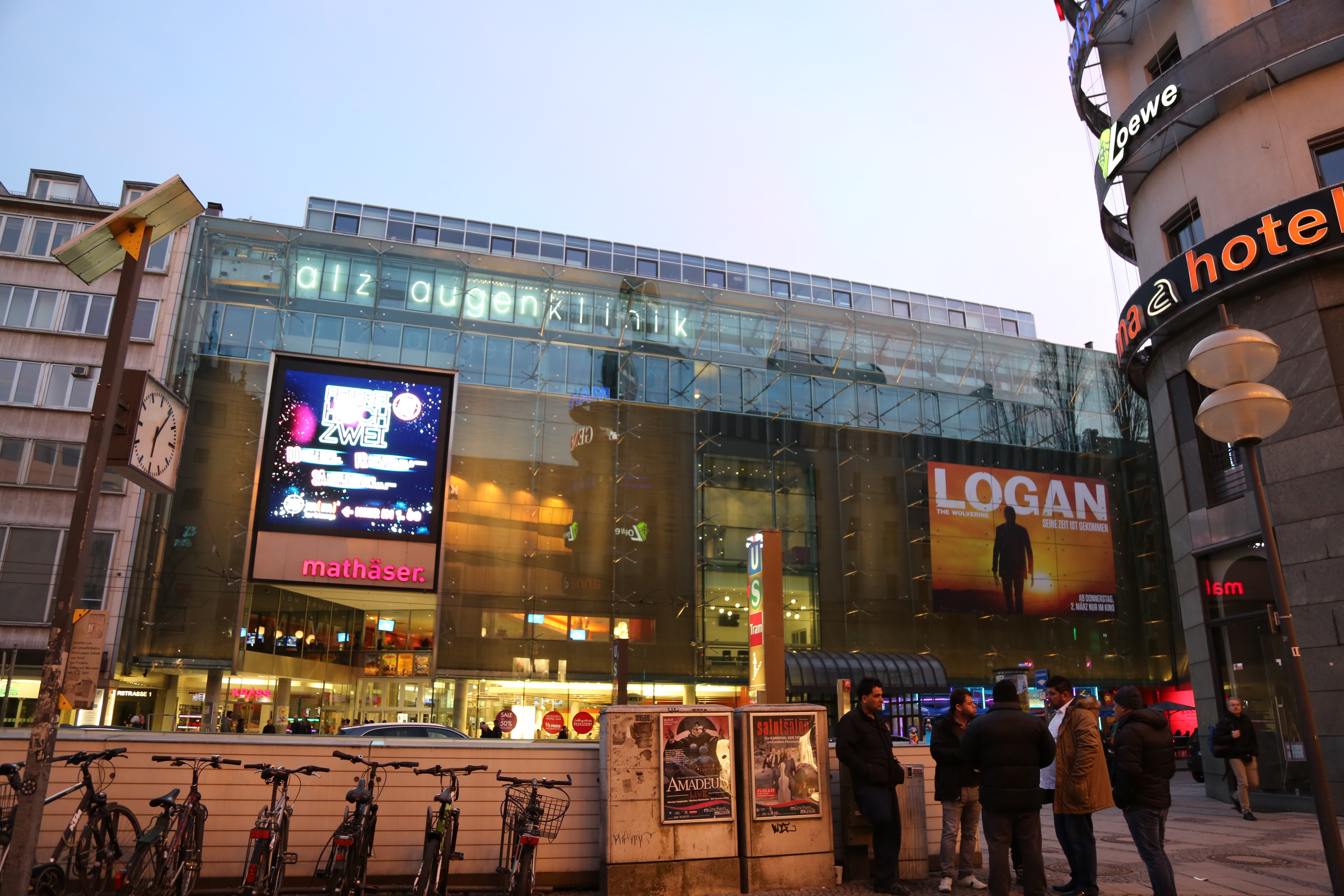
The current cinema complex

Logo of the Mathäser Filmpalast

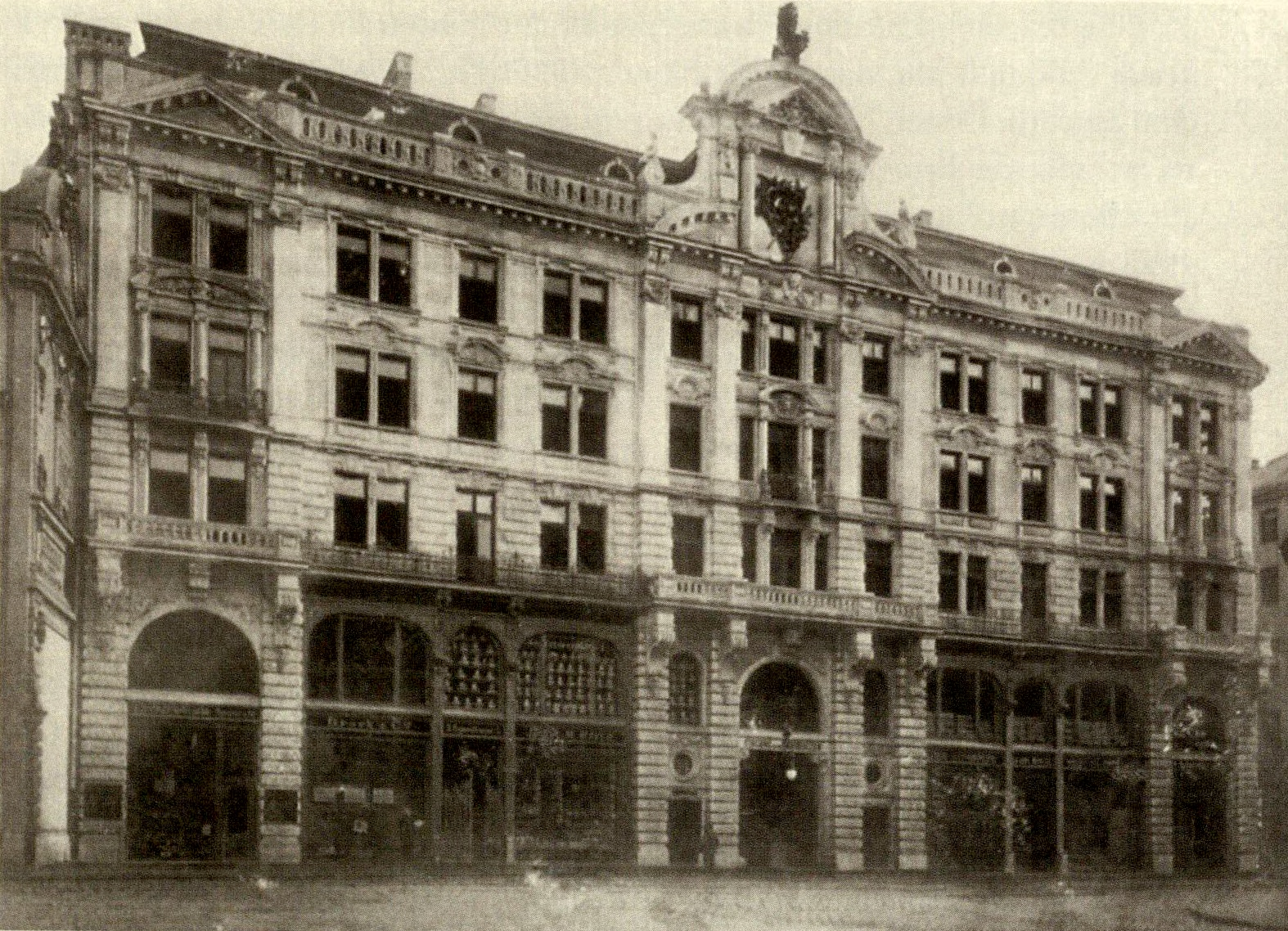
The brewery and beer hall for Löwenbräu built in 1893

The Mathäser is a beer hall in Munich, west of the Karlsplatz. It had a variety of buildings and uses over the centuries but was especially known for its beer. It gained wider attraction following the German Revolution of 1918, serving as the headquarters for revolutionaries during the Bavarian Soviet Republic. It now houses a large cinema, called the Mathäser Filmpalast.

== History of the Mathäser ==
=== Origin of the Mathäser ===
In 1690 the first beer hall opened on the site of today's Mathäser in Munich's Ludwigsvorstadt. In 1818, the brewer Georg Hartl, owner of the Zum Kleinen Löwengarten beer hall on what was then Landsberger Straße (today Bayerstraße), bought the Fuchsbräu, which was founded in the 15th century. In previous years, Hartl had already acquired several adjacent plots of land. His real estate thus took up almost all of what later became Mathäser. With the help of the Fuchsbräurechte, Fuchsbräu's brewing rights, Hartl planned to found a new brewery on his property and to shut down the original Fuchsbräu brewery on Schwabinger Gasse. In the same year he received a concession to open his Hartlische brewery on the Löwengarten site and began building the new brewery building. The rooms of the old lion garden initially served as a beer bar. Hartl ran the business until his death in 1825, after which it passed to his heirs until 1829.

From 1829 to 1832, Max J. Boshart ran the Härtlisches Brauhaus, from 1832 to 1844 it was owned by the "Braugrafen" Theobald Graf von Buttler-Haimhausen and was called Buttler-Bräu. Buttler's heirs leased the brewery to Anton Köck from 1847 to 1855, then to Ludwig Brey until 1857. In 1858, Georg Mathäser acquired the property. He initially stopped the brewery and only continued the hospitality business. In 1872 he resumed brewing under the name Mathäser-Bräu. After his death in 1874, his widow Anna Mathäser continued the business, with the brewery using the name Mathäser-Bräu from 1874 to 1884 as well as the former name of Zum bayerischen Löwen (English: The Bavarian Lion) resumed. In 1884, the company was converted into the joint-stock brewery Zum Bayerischen Löwen, formerly A. Mathäser.

In 1892, a new brewery building was constructed. The former factory rooms were converted into beer halls and August Exter built a new wing on the street side with a representative facade in the neo-Renaissance style. In 1899–1900, the Heilmann & Littmann construction company added a two-story hall extension to the building. The upper hall was equipped with a wooden barrel roof and wall paintings by Julius Mössel.

In 1907, Löwenbräu AG bought the Mathäser, which had already become a well-known Munich institution, and expanded it with three beer halls, a ballroom and a beer garden with seating for around 4,000. In 1915, brewing operations were discontinued.

=== Headquarters of the Revolution in Munich ===
At the end of the First World War, a workers' and soldiers' council was constituted in the Mathäser-Bräu under the chairmanship of Kurt Eisner on the night of November 7–8, 1918. About 1,000 people gathered in the ballroom, who had separated themselves from a mass pacifist demonstration on the Theresienwiese. This event was the birth of the People's State of Bavaria. The Mathäser location was probably chosen because of its spaciousness, its popularity and the central location between the main train station, Wittelsbacher Palais, state parliament building, foreign ministry, residence and police headquarters. It subsequently served as the headquarters of the revolutionary movement. After the revolution was crushed, the Mathäser returned to its original function as a beer pub. The Munich artist Oskar Maria Graf called for a revolution in 1919, for which he rented the Mathäser; however, the event had extremely low turnout.

=== The Mathäser-Bierstadt ===
During World War II, the Mathäser was completely destroyed in air raids by the Allies. It wasn't until December 1957 that the newly built Mathäser-Bierstadt could be opened on a 8,100-square-meter lot. Ernst Eckstein, the chief architect of the Löwenbrauerei, designed a five-story, double-gabled building along Bayerstraße with reinforced concrete construction. It included a shopping arcade, the Bierstadt with 16 restaurants equipped with seating for over 5,000 people, the Mathäser Filmpalast, a 1,200 seat movie theater which was the largest movie screen at the time in West Germany, measuring 21 meters by 8.5 meters (68'10" by 27'10"). 4,600 square meters of retail and office space and an underground parking garage.

The opening program in the ballroom ran from December 21, 1957, to January 15, 1958. In 1958, the Reiss family, operators and tenants, represented the Mathäser with the restaurant Oberbayern at the World Exhibition in Brussels. In the following nearly 40 years, the Bierstadt hosted many lavish parties. In 1962, Löwenbrauerei organized an "Upper Bavarian Beer Festival" in Bordighera on the Italian Riviera, which was a great success. As a token of gratitude, the city of Bordighera sent five thousand carnations the following year to decorate the "Spring Festival" in the ballroom of the Bierstadt. In 1967, driven by Löwenbräu AG, they engaged in the German Pavilion's "Restaurant Bavarois" at the 1967 International and Universal Exposition. In 1969, the branch "Petit Munich" was opened in Montreal, which was sold again in the late 1980s.

The Mathäser Filmpalast was opened on January 24, 1957, and due to its size, it became a popular premiere cinema. The opening film in 1957 was Der Bettelstudent (The Beggar Student). Several Karl May films, among others, had their premieres here in the 1960s. With the advent of the mass medium television in people's living rooms, the era of large cinemas came to an end in the 1970s. In 1978, the film theater company Georg Reiss transformed Munich's largest cinema into a cineplex consisting of four theaters. After the renovation, the Mathäser reopened with Sam Peckinpah's Convoy marking the heyday of Hollywood action cinema. Since Hall A, which has 600 seats was still Munich's largest cinema hall, many premieres continued to take place there. The grand ballroom was the venue for the German Film Ball until the closure of the restaurant.

=== New Construction ===
In 1996, the old movie theater and the Bierstadt ceased operations, with the final screening of Mars Attacks! The buildings were demolished in 1998. In 1999, construction began by the developer, Deutscher Herold Lebensversicherung AG. After four years of construction, the new multiplex cinema opened on 21 May 2003, with the screening of Matrix Reloaded in every . The building was designed by Peter Lanz as a shopping, entertainment, and business center. The Kinopolis Group operates the Mathäser Filmpalast, where many film premieres and special events such as the opening event of the Munich International Film Festival, the Asia Filmfest, and the Munich International Short Film Festival take place. The freely divisible spaces for retail and restaurants are directly connected to the cinema. Visitors can access the central core of the facility, the central rotunda, from both the U-Bahn and the S-Bahn, and from street level on Bayerstraße. Escalators from the rotunda connect the three main levels where the cinema halls are located.
