= Anita Miller Smith =

American painter

- Born: October 20, 1893; Torresdale, Pennsylvania
- Died: 1968 (aged 74–75); Woodstock, New York
- Known for: Painting
- Movement: Impressionism, Regionalism
- Awards: In 1919 her Houses in the Dunes won a Lambert Purchase Prize at the Pennsylvania Academy of Fine Arts.

Anita M. Smith (full name Anita Miller Smith, October 20, 1893 – 1968) was an impressionist and regionalist painter most closely associated with Woodstock, New York. In the 1930s Smith became an herbalist, and her venture, Stonecrop Gardens, was one of only five enterprises of like size in the Northeast, serving clients in every one of the 48 contiguous states. During this phase of her career, she authored and published As True as the Barnacle Tree, a short herbal based on ancient and contemporary practices. In the 1950s she wrote the town of Woodstock's first history, Woodstock History and Hearsay.

== Upbringing ==
Smith's paternal ancestor, Giles Knight, arrived in the American colonies aboard The Welcome with William Penn in 1682. Knight, a Quaker and former English landowner, established a farm in the Byberry region of Pennsylvania. One of Knight's descendants, Henry Cavalier Smith, an attorney-at-law, married Lucy Pancoast Miller. The couple assumed control of Wyndlawn, the Smith country estate in Torresdale, Pennsylvania. This was where Anita M. Smith was born on October 20, 1893, the youngest of five children.

In 1910 Smith and her mother embarked on a tour of Europe, the Middle East and North Africa. Smith also took instruction at the Académie Julian in Paris, the art studios of Ferruccio Scattola in Venice, the atelier Forcello in Cairo, and the British Academy in Rome. Each day was divided between morning art instruction and afternoon tours of such museums as the Louvre in Paris, the Palace of the Doges in Venice, and ancient cathedrals including St. Sophia's in Constantinople.

== Career as an artist ==
In 1912 Smith ventured up to the art colony at Woodstock, New York, using money intended for a ball gown, and enrolled in the Art Students League summer program. That fall she returned to Philadelphia to take lessons from William Merritt Chase. In an interview with the Poughkeepsie Sunday New Yorker, she described how her deepening commitment to art forced her to move away from Philadelphia. Later on in the article, she said that she believed it "necessary to dig into the history of the countryside" and that she "didn't see how one could paint the Catskills without knowing something of the people who lived among them, thus reflecting a literary approach to art." In 1913 she commenced studies under John F. Carlson at the Arts Students League in Woodstock.

Smith painted in an impressionist and a post-impressionist manner. She worked in oil, watercolor and graphic media. Primarily a landscape artist, she painted landscapes in a variety of area including New Hope, Pennsylvania, Provincetown, Massachusetts; Charleston, South Carolina, New York City, Taxco de Alarcon, Mexico and Paris, France.

From 1916 to 1928 Smith's works were exhibited nationally at such venues as the Pennsylvania Academy of the Fine Arts, the Wilmington Society of the Fine Arts, the Art Gallery of Toronto, the Woodstock Artists Association, the National Academy of Design, the Art Institute of Chicago and the Louisville Art Association. In 1919 her painting Houses in the Dunes won a Lambert Purchase Prize at the Pennsylvania Academy—along with the work of such fellow artists as Paulette Van Roekens and Lilian Westcott Hale. In 1922-1923, she lived with the artist Julia Searing Leaycraft in Woodstock.

== Career as a herbalist ==
In the 1930s Miss Smith embarked on a second career as an herbalist after the Great Depression prompted her to leave painting. She wrote that people with a sense of color are supposed to have a keen sense of taste and, since many of the artists were excellent cooks, she and her associates tried to share tasty dishes with one another. To accomplish this, she found it necessary to grow a few herbs for culinary purposes. She was also an enthusiastic gardener and she found that her hobby changed to a vocation as her herb gardens began to turn a profit. This was during a time when popular interest in herbs soared across the country.

In 1934 Smith built a bluestone cottage near the Rock City Corners at the base of Overlook Mountain, about a mile from the center of Woodstock. By 1937 a greenhouse was added, and a short time later she had over 150 herbs under cultivation, with commercial clients that included H.J. Heinz. During this period, Smith's As True as the Barnacle Tree was cited in a New York Herald Tribune article, and its writer dubbed her "The Herb Lady of the Catskills".

After the war, Dr. James T. Shotwell, a neighbor and friend, asked Smith to compile a service database; the record was to include all Woodstockers who fought for their country during the Second World War. This formed a key chapter in her soon-to-be-published book, Woodstock History and Hearsay—the town's first official chronicle. Smith based her narrative on detailed scholarship as well as a wide-ranging collection of local folk stories gathered from Catskill mountain families and resident artists. The story's arc begins with Native American times and concludes with chapters on the art colony, leading up to the Woodstock Festival of 1969. Smith also wrote The Landscape of History and The Quest of Abel Knight: The Quakers and Shakers. Because of a resurgence of public interest in Smith's paintings, her works were exhibited at the USArtists Show in 2003 and 2005. In 2006, publisher WoodstockArts released a second edition of Woodstock History and Hearsay.
