= Trinity Episcopal Church Complex (Saugerties, New York) =

Historic church in New York, United States

- U.S. National Register of Historic Places
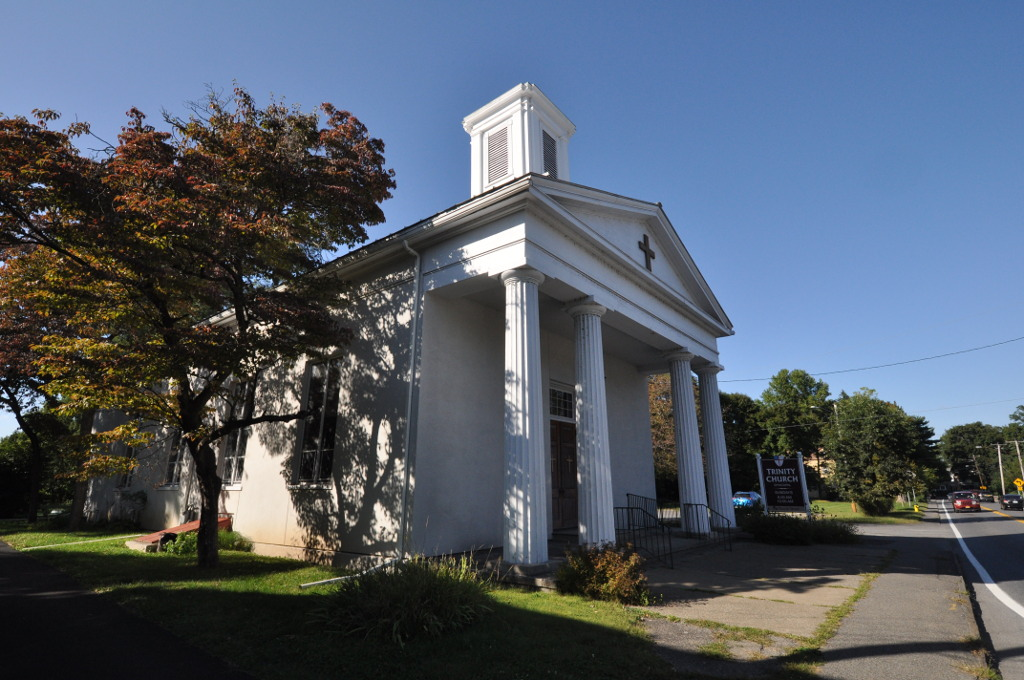

- Location within New York Location within the United States
- Location: Jct. of Church St. and Barclay St., Saugerties, New York
- Coordinates: 42°4′4″N 73°56′55″W
- Area: 4.8 acres (1.9 ha)
- Built: 1831, c. 1875, c. 1890
- Architectural style: Greek Revival, Dutch Revival
- NRHP reference No.: 98001006
- Added to NRHP: August 06, 1998

Trinity Episcopal Church Complex is a historic Episcopal church complex located at the junction of Church Street and Barclay Street in Saugerties, Ulster County, New York. The church was built in 1831, and is a large one-story, Greek Revival style frame building. A large wing was added about 1900. The front facade features a pedimented portico with four fluted Doric order columns. Also on the property is the H-shaped brick Parish Hall (c. 1875) and the 2 1/2-story, Dutch Revival style rectory (c. 1890).

It was added to the National Register of Historic Places in 1998.

The Parish was founded by Henry Barclay (1778-1857), a son of Loyalist emigré Thomas Henry Barclay who returned to his native New York. Barclay was a local entrepreneur and landowner who sponsored infrastructure projects in the area, such as dams and bridges. In the 1820s, services were held at Barclay's house, eventually being moved to the new church in 1833. The building of the church was partially sponsored by the parishioners of Trinity Church, Broadway, where Barclay was a vestryman and had established ancestral connections. Shortly after the completion of the building, a spire was built, although this was lost during the 20th century.

In 1874, the Vanderpoel family commissioned a window designed by William Morris to be installed at the church. This window is thought to be the first such commission for an American client. In 1922, a window triptych nicknamed the "Tiffany Window" for its resemblance to the works of Louis Comfort Tiffany was installed in the Parish Hall. In 2019, the windows were re-attributed to Rudolph Geissler of Lederle and Geissler, a former employee of Tiffany and Co.
