= Wynkoop House =

- U.S. National Register of Historic Places
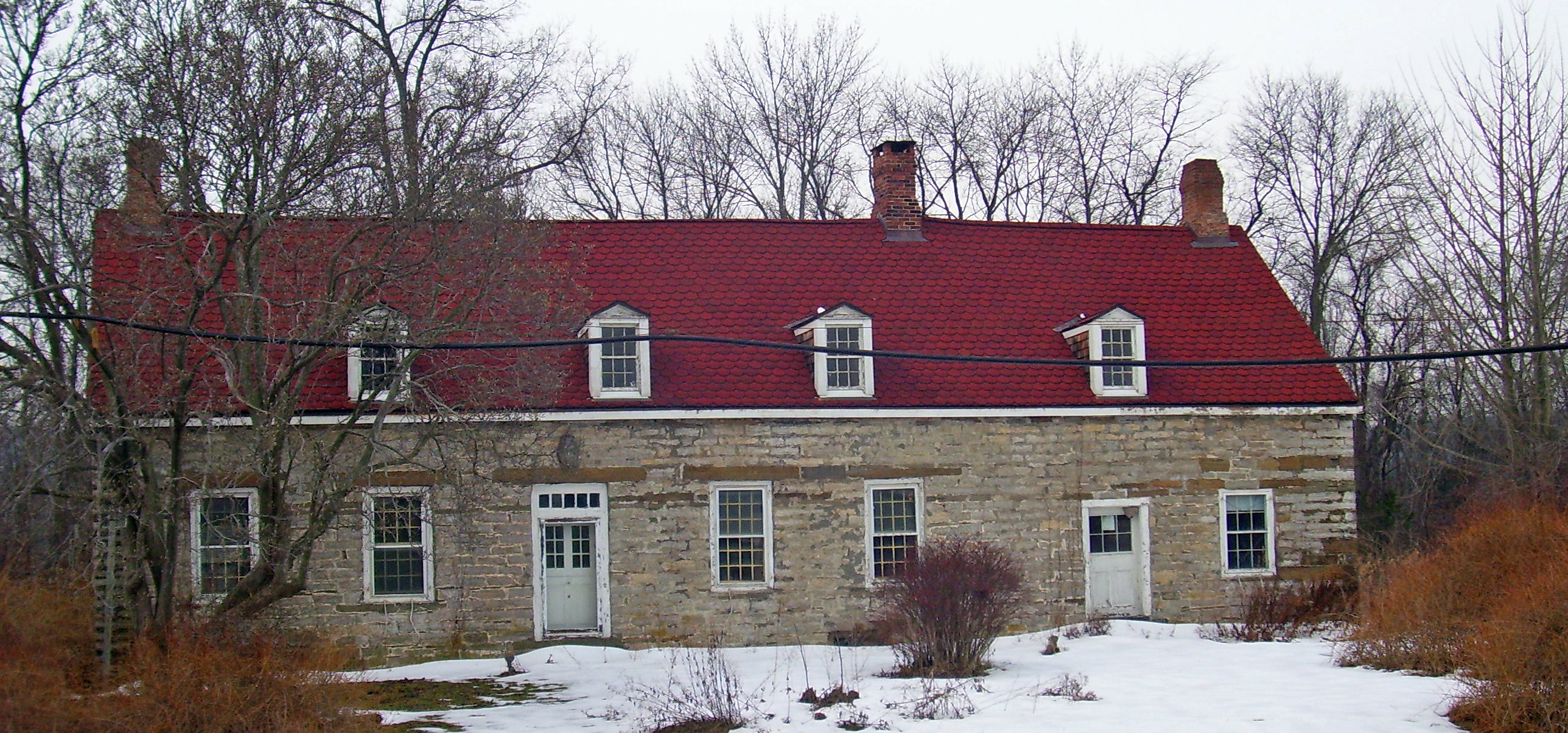
- Front (east) elevation of house, 2007

- Location within New York Location within the United States
- Interactive map showing the location of Wynkoop House
- Location: Saugerties, New York
- Nearest city: Kingston
- Coordinates: 42°05′15″N 73°58′27″W
- Area: 3 acres (1.2 ha)
- Built: c. 1740
- Architectural style: Dutch Colonial
- NRHP reference No.: 84003237
- Added to NRHP: September 7, 1984

The Wynkoop House is located on New York Route 32 just north of an offramp from the New York State Thruway and its junction with NY 212 in the town of Saugerties, New York, United States. It is a linear stone house built in two sections by the descendants of Dutch settlers around 1740, and renovated in later years.

Architecturally, it has many well-preserved features of the type of Dutch stone house common in 18th-century Ulster County, with some others suggesting later efforts to distance its residents from the original idea. It remained in the hands of the Wynkoop descendants until the early 20th century. In 1984 it was listed on the National Register of Historic Places (NRHP).

== Building ==
The house is a rectangular 1 1/2-story, seven-bay stone house with gabled roof, front dormer windows and chimneys at both ends. The earliest portion of the house is marked by a small entrance and window near the north end on the front (east) facade; the later addition, constituting the bulk of the house, has a transomed door symmetrically placed between two windows on either side. The west facade has a matching door and window placement, now covered by an enclosed porch.

Inside, the original square block on the north end is a one-room space with exposed rafters and floorboards above. Much of the original wooden trim is still present, including some rare crown molding over the west door and south passageway to the later addition.

That wide passageway runs the length of the house, with smaller rooms of various purposes on either side. The fireplaces at either end of the addition have retained their original mantels, including the dentilled molding on the south one. Similar original woodwork is found elsewhere in the first story. The upper story has been subvidided into bedrooms and remodeled considerably.

The house has two outbuildings, a modern metal barn and detached garage, on its 3-acre (1.2 ha) lot. Neither are considered contributing resources to the NRHP listing. A late-19th-century photograph shows a carriage house near the property. No evidence of any other historic outbuildings has been found.

== History ==
Cornelius Wynkoop brought his family name to the New World when he settled in present-day Hurley in 1667. His descendants had reached Saugerties by the middle of the following century. The land on which the house is built was originally granted to Richard Hays and George Mealls by James II in 1688. A Wynkoop is known to have built the house; however which one in unclear as unlike most other Ulster County stone houses, there is no stone with the builder's initials.

There is a date stone in the wall near the back door reading "1740", but they are not considered reliable sources for the true construction date of Ulster County stone houses, and other evidence suggests the larger portion of the house was added near the end of the century. It is likely that the smaller northern block was built around then. A 1763 map of Saugerties shows the house, the earliest known record.

The longer wing was added sometime in the later 18th century. Its symmetrical stylings and dormer windows suggest a strong Georgian influence, and masons' marks on the bluestone window lintels bear dates in the 1790s.

The upper floor was remodeled in the 1920s with contemporary interior decorations such as wainscoting. Up until that time, descendants of the Wynkoops had continued to live in the house and preserve it. Later owners also kept it in its original form.

In the early 2000s one owner threatened to demolish it, claiming it was in advanced state of disrepair, and began plans to do so and develop the property as an office complex, clearing the surrounding trees. Local preservationists were able to stop the town from issuing the necessary permit. The Ulster County Genealogical Society expressed interest in using the house as its library. It is currently a private residence.

== Aesthetics ==
The fact that the house is built of stone to begin with is culturally significant. Dutch colonists in the Province of New York had lived under English rule since the end of the Third Anglo-Dutch War in 1674, but they resisted assimilation by the newly dominant culture, often speaking Dutch as their first language and building stone houses in accordance with their native building traditions throughout much of the 18th century, including a period after American independence.

The Wynkoop House is a well-preserved example of a stone house that is not only Dutch but has stylistic touches distinctive to Ulster County as well, most notably in the gabled roof ends (elsewhere, gambrel roofs were preferred). On the outside, locally quarried limestone was used as the facing, as opposed to the cut sandstone seen in houses further south in the region. Inside, the crown molding and exposed floorboards are another regional hallmark.

The symmetry the house retained even after being tripled in size later in the century suggests that it was originally built with the expectation that it would eventually be expanded in that fashion. Similarly, the nearly identical facades suggest that Kings Highway, the predecessor to Route 32 on which the house was built, at one point ran to the west of the house and was later relocated to the east.

In the later years of the century, younger descendants of the Dutch began to see the stone houses their parents and grandparents had raised as archaic, and often modified them along more contemporary lines. The Georgian stylings and dormer windows of the later addition suggest an attempt to do this.
