= Leon Barritt =

American cartoonist (1852–1938)

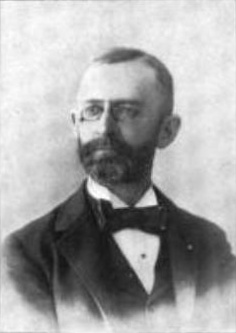
- Born: November 5, 1852; Saugerties, New York
- Died: 1938
- Occupations: Illustrator, cartoonist

Leon Barritt (1852–1938) was an American illustrator, cartoonist, journalist, and amateur astronomer. He produced a famous cartoon satirizing Joseph Pulitzer and William Randolph Hearst, co-invented with Garrett P. Serviss the Barritt–Serviss Star and Planet Finder, a popular star chart sold into the 1950s, and, after losing his artistic ability to paralysis, founded The Monthly Evening Sky Map magazine. Born in Saugerties, New York, he began as a news agent in his home town before moving to Boston to work as an engraver. After a year in Minnesota, he returned to New York in 1884, where he became cartoonist for the New York Press.

== Gallery ==
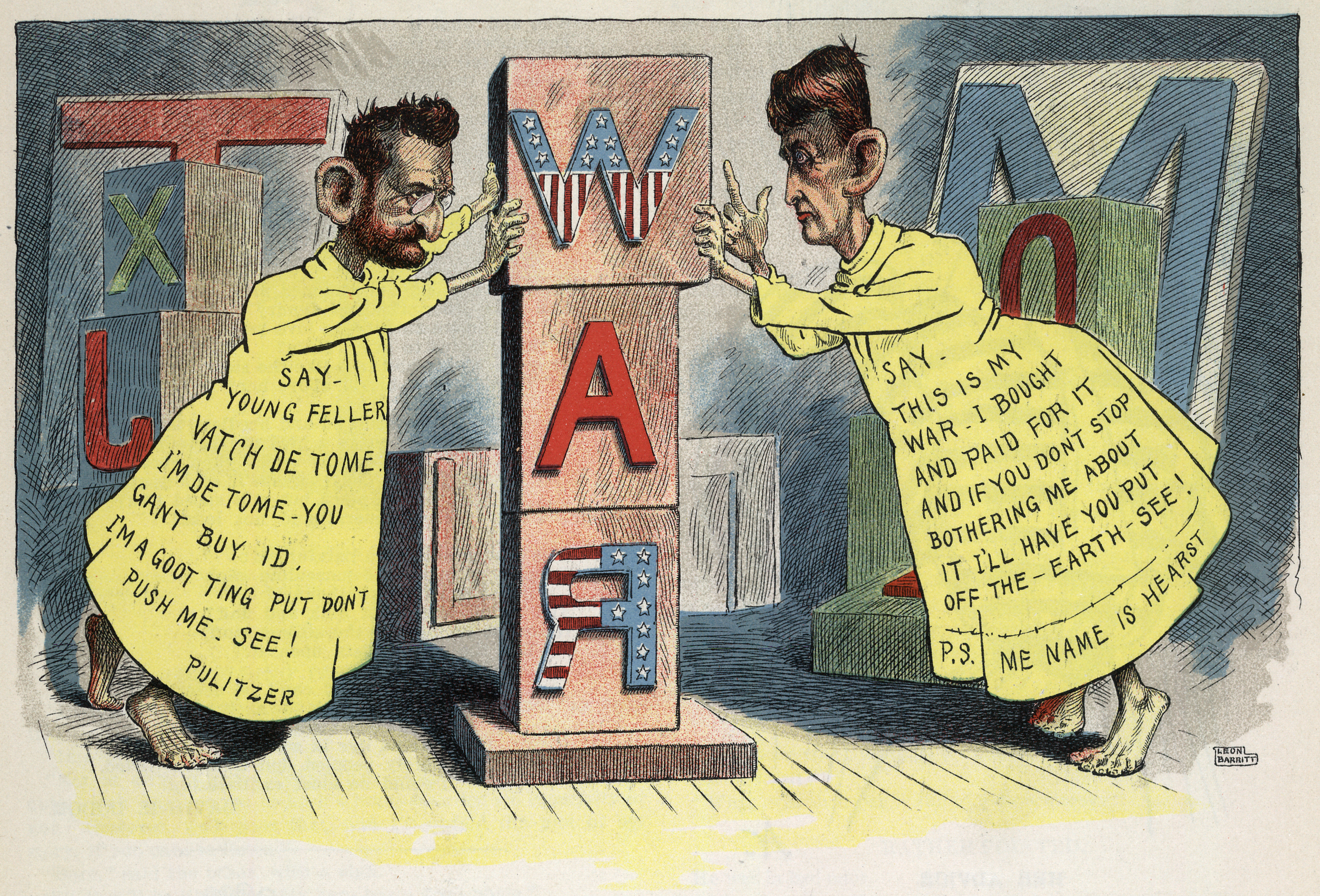
Pulitzer and Hearst depicted as struggling over coverage of the US-Spanish War

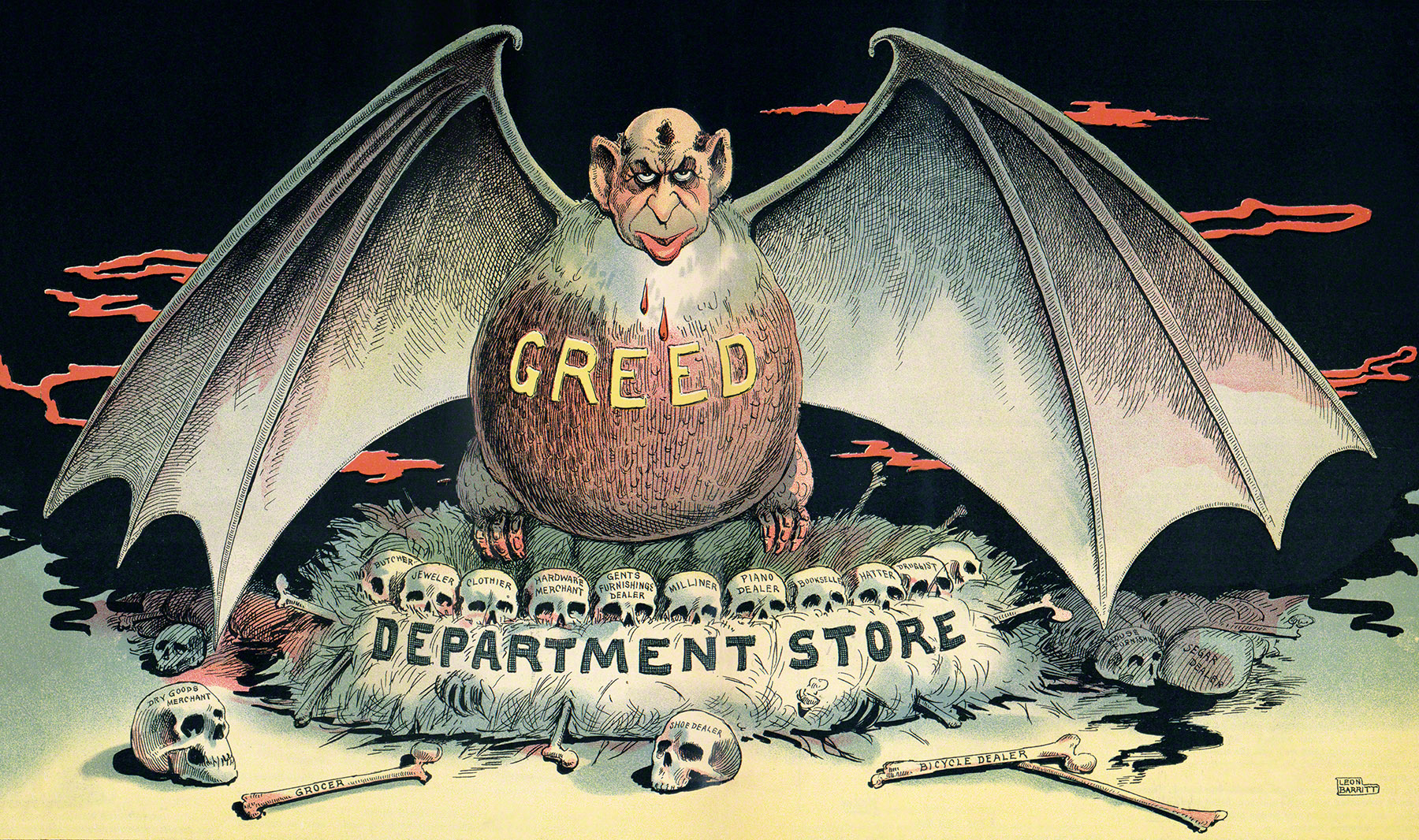
"The Commercial Vampire" (1898), an antisemitic cartoon against Jewish department store owners

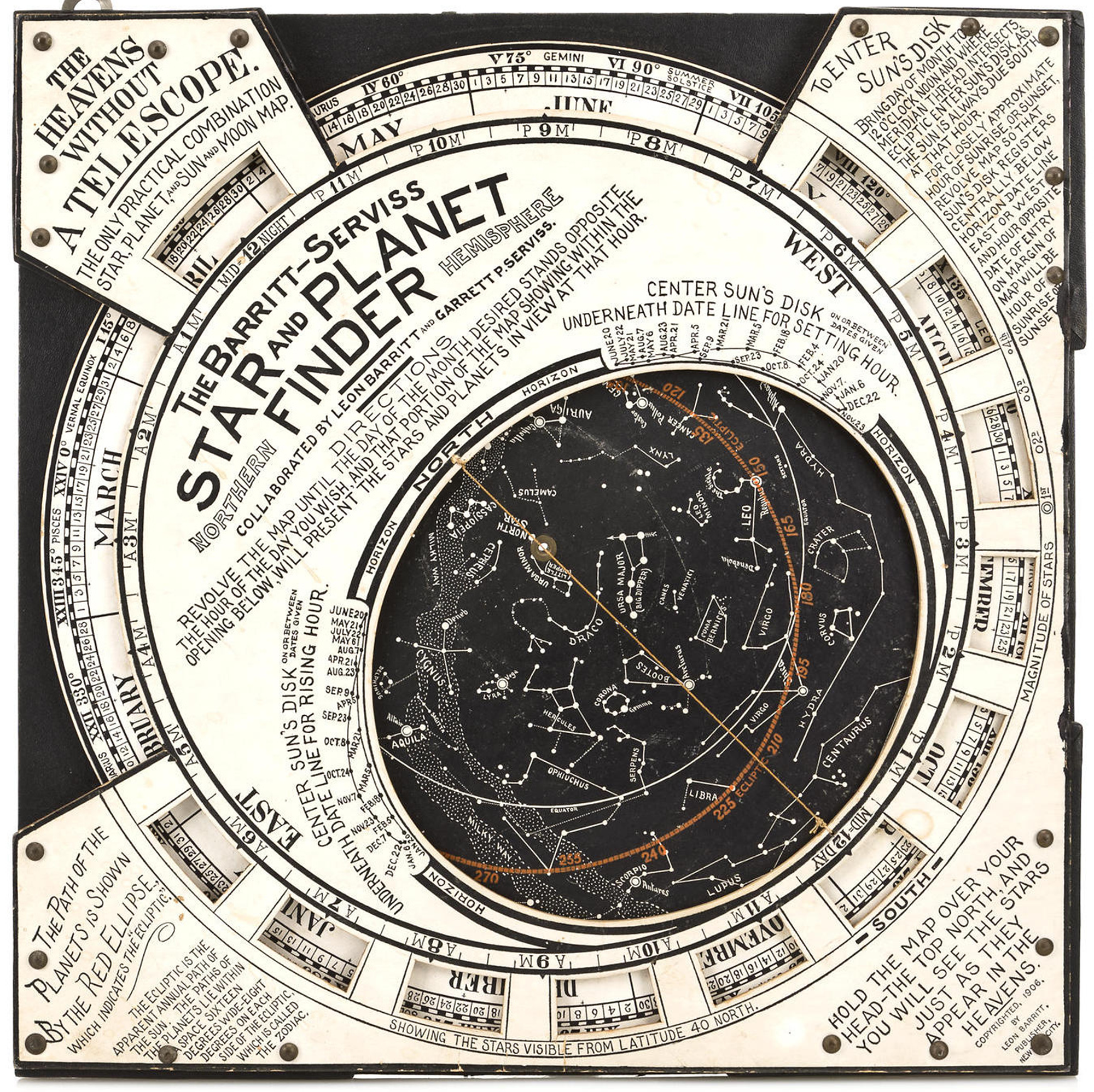
The Barritt–Serviss Star and Planet Finder
