= Trumpbour Homestead Farm =

Historic house in New York, United States

- U.S. National Register of Historic Places
- Location within New York Location within the United States
- Nearest city: Saugerties, New York
- Coordinates: 42°8′23″N 73°57′0″W
- Area: 81 acres (33 ha)
- Built: 1732
- Architectural style: Federal
- NRHP reference No.: 85002422
- Added to NRHP: September 19, 1985

The Trumpbour Homestead Farm is a National Register of Historic Places listing located in Saugerties, New York. The property contains six buildings, including a c. 1732 vernacular stone house.

It was listed on the National Register of Historic Places in 1985.
