= Loerzel Beer Hall =

Historic commercial building in New York, United States

- U.S. National Register of Historic Places
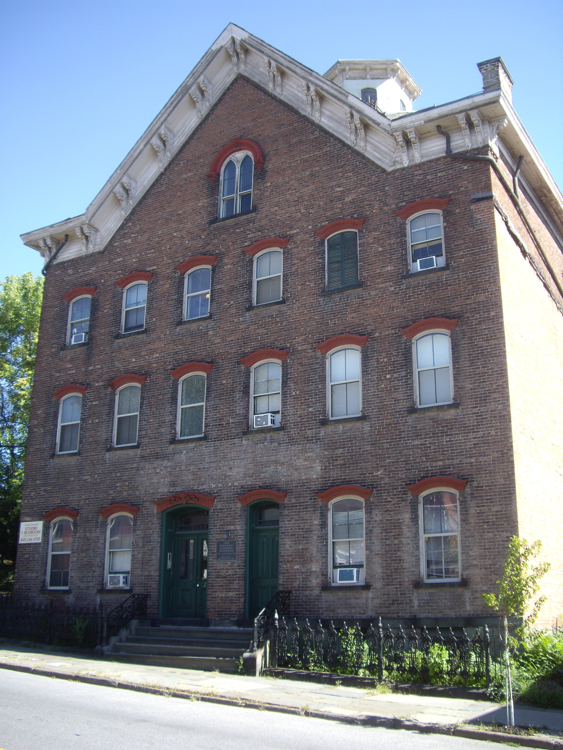

- Location within New York Location within the United States
- Location: 213 Partition St., Saugerties, NY, United States
- Coordinates: 42°4′29.29″N 73°57′4.33″W
- Area: less than one acre
- Built: c. 1873
- NRHP reference No.: 84003234
- Added to NRHP: September 7, 1984

The Loerzel Beer Hall, also known as "The Brewery", was built in 1873 at 213 Partition Street in Saugerties, Ulster County, New York. It is a large three-story, brick building that measures 45 feet wide and 65 feet deep, and features broad brick gables with lancet openings, a heavy cornice, and decorative cast-iron lintels. It was rehabilitated in 1985. It currently serves as an apartment building.

It was added to the National Register of Historic Places in 2000.

== See also ==
- Beer hall
- Brewing
