= Roger Morse =

American beekeeper and academic (1927–2000)

Roger A. Morse
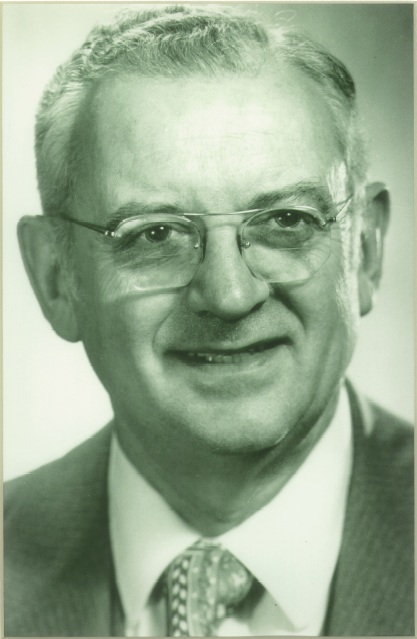
- Born: July 5, 1927; Saugerties, New York
- Died: May 12, 2000 (aged 72); Ithaca, New York
- Education: Cornell University (PhD 1955)
- Occupations: Beekeeper and Professor
- Notable work: Research on honey bees with regards to acarine mite, varroa mite and African small hive beetle.

Roger A. Morse, Ph.D. (July 5, 1927 - May 12, 2000) was an American bee biologist who, through his research and publications, taught the rudiments and finer practices of beekeeping. Morse was involved in research on honeybee parasites, acarine mite, varroa mite, and African small hive beetle which were introduced to the United States during his career. He also provided guidance to the beekeeping industry on the Africanized honeybee and Pesticide misuse.

== Education and career ==
Morse was born in Saugerties, New York, and joined the U.S. Army at age seventeen and served from 1944 to 1947. He received his bachelor's degree from Cornell University in 1950, his masters in 1953 and his doctorate in 1955, and did postgraduate work with the State Plant Board in Gainesville, Florida. After a brief stint as assistant professor at the University of Massachusetts Amherst, he returned to Cornell University where he remained until retirement. Morse taught an introductory course on beekeeping, which was available to students as an elective. He was made chairman of the entomology department in 1986, until 1989. In 1989 he was made a fellow of the Entomological Society of America, and had been a member of the American Association for the Advancement of Science since 1975. He also served as visiting professor at the University of Helsinki, Finland, the University of São Paulo, Brazil, and the University of the Philippines, Los Baños.

== Publications ==
Morse wrote books and magazine articles. He also edited and made contributions to collective works. This is a partial list.

Contributor:

- Annotated Bibliography on Varroa Jacobsoni, Tropilaelaps Clareae and Euvarroa Sinhai (IBRA Bibliography)
- The ABC and XYZ of Bee Culture
- The Illustrated Encyclopedia of Beekeeping
- Honey Bee Pests, Predators, and Diseases
- Making Mead Honey Wine: History, Recipes, Methods and Equipment
- Morse wrote a regular column in Bee Culture magazine

Author:

- Bees and Beekeeping
- Honey Shows: Guidelines for Exhibitors, Superintendents, and Judges
- The New Complete Guide to Beekeeping
- Rearing Queen Honey Bees
- Richard Archbold and the Archbold Biological Station
- A Year in the Beeyard: An Expert's Month-by-Month Instructions for Successful Beekeeping
