= Saugerties High School =

Coordinates: 42.0860°N 73.9477°W

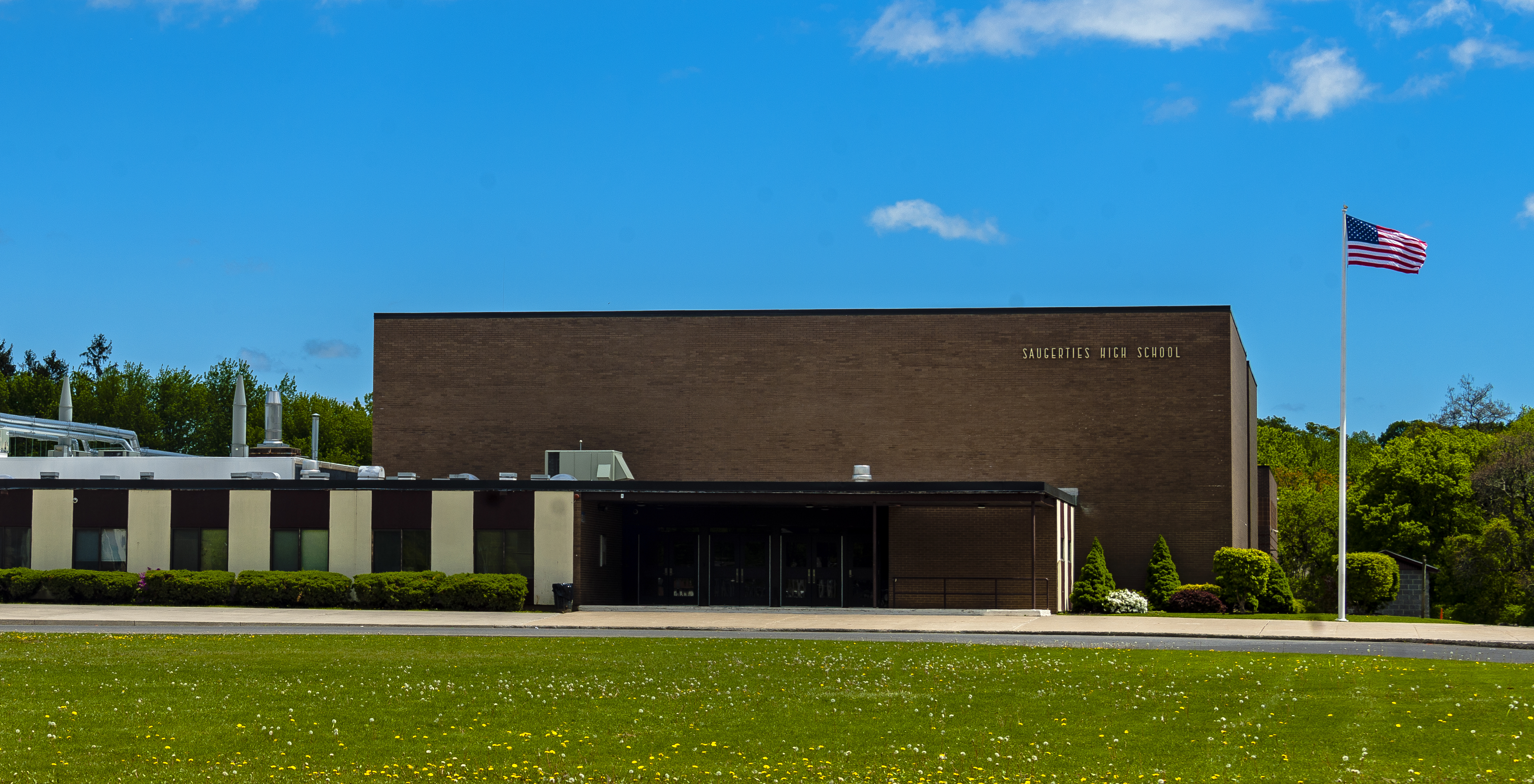

Location
- 310 Washington Avenue Saugerties; New York 12477; United States

Information
- Type: Public High school
- Teaching staff: 63.79 (FTE)
- Enrollment: 768 (2023-2024)
- Student to teacher ratio: 12.04
- Color
- Team name: Sawyers
- Website: Official site

Saugerties High School is a public high school in Saugerties Town, New York, United States. It was built in 1958, and it is physically attached to the Junior High School which runs from 7th to 8th grade. It is the only high school in the Saugerties Central School District.

The school district, of which this is the sole comprehensive high school, includes Saugerties Village and the following census-designated places: Glasco, Malden-on-Hudson, and Saugerties South, as well as portions of the Ruby and Woodstock CDPs. The school district includes all of the Town of Saugerties as well as a section of the Town of Woodstock

== Notable alumni ==
- Darnell Edge (born 1997) – professional basketball player
- Jimmy Fallon (class of 1992) – comedian, host of The Tonight Show Starring Jimmy Fallon
- Edward M. Flanagan Jr. (1921–2019) (class of 1937) – US Army lieutenant general
- Tom Hallion (class of 1974) – Major League Baseball umpire
- Joe Sinnott (1926–2020) – Marvel Comics artist
- Dior Johnson (born 2004) - college basketball player
