= Kiersted house =

- Dubois--Kierstede Stone House
- U.S. National Register of Historic Places
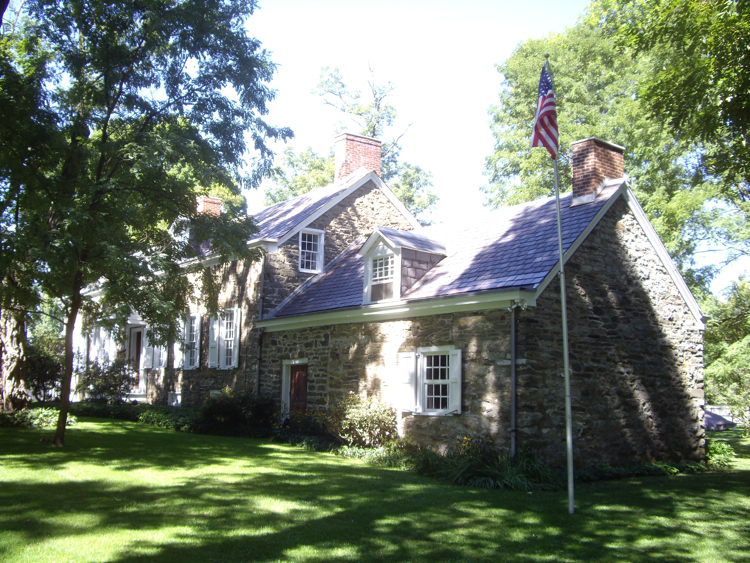

- Location within New York Location within the United States
- Interactive map showing the location of Dubois-Kiersted House
- Location: 119 Main Street, Saugerties, NY, United States
- Coordinates: 42°4′44.54″N 73°56′59.16″W
- Built: 1727
- Architect: Hiskia Dubois
- Architectural style: Dutch Colonial architecture
- NRHP reference No.: 98000550
- Added to NRHP: May 20, 1998

Dubois-Kierstede Stone House is one of several historic stone buildings in Saugerties, New York. It was built in 1727 and modified over the years. It is currently the home of the Saugerties Historical Society, which operates the structure as the Kiersted House Museum. In 2001, the society received a $150k grant to further restore the building. The house was listed in the National Register of Historic Places in 1998.
