= Julia Searing Leaycraft =

American artist

- Born: Julia Searing; November 26, 1885; Saugerties, New York
- Died: December 21, 1960 (age 75); New York City
- Occupation(s): Artist, editor, arts administrator
- Relatives: Frank Pidgeon (grandfather)

Julia Searing Leaycraft (November 26, 1885 – December 21, 1960) was an American artist and editor.

== Early life and education ==
Julia Searing was born in Saugerties, New York, and raised in Kingston, New York, the daughter of John Welch Searing and Annie Eliza Pidgeon Searing. Her father was a lawyer and newspaper editor, and her mother was a writer and suffragist. Her grandfather, Frank Pidgeon, was a noted baseball player in the nineteenth century.

Searing graduated from Vassar College in 1906, and made further studies in art with the Art Students League of New York, where she studied with William Merritt Chase, and at the Woodstock School of Landscape Painting.

== Career ==
As a young woman, Searing was on the staff of New Idea, and managing editor at The Delineator. During World War I, she worked in publicity for the YWCA. She taught art at the Slater Memorial Museum in Connecticut.

Leaycraft was founder and first president of the Intercollegiate Bureau of Occupations, an employment service for college-educated women. She was also a founding member of the Women's City Club of New York. She was chair of the art department at the Dalton School from 1928 to 1932. She was elected vice-president of the Woodstock Library Association in the 1930s.

With her children grown, she spent more time on painting and printmaking in the 1930s and 1940s, but she was also involved in the National Youth Administration, in building what became the Woodstock School of Art. She exhibited her art, with shows in Woodstock, Albany, and New York City. She was active in the Woodstock Artists Association, the National Association of Women Artists, and other professional organizations. In 1947, she chaired a committee to raise funds for a war memorial in Woodstock. In 1959 she contributed folk song lyrics, remembered from her childhood, to a concert of Catskills-area traditional music.

== Publications ==
- "The Intercollegiate Bureau of Occupations of New York" (1915)
- "The College Alumna's Work" (1917)
- "An American Christmas in Many Tongues" (1918)
- "The Y.W.C.A. in the Magazines" (1919)
- "Publicity, Interpreter" (1919)

== Personal life ==
Searing married lawyer and real estate broker Edgar Crawford Leaycraft in 1913. They had two children. She moved to Woodstock with her children in the 1920s, and lived there with another artist, Anita Miller Smith, in 1922 and 1923. The Leaycrafts divorced in 1929. She died in 1960, in New York City, at the age of 75.
