= Saugerties Light =

Lighthouse on the Hudson River, New York, USA

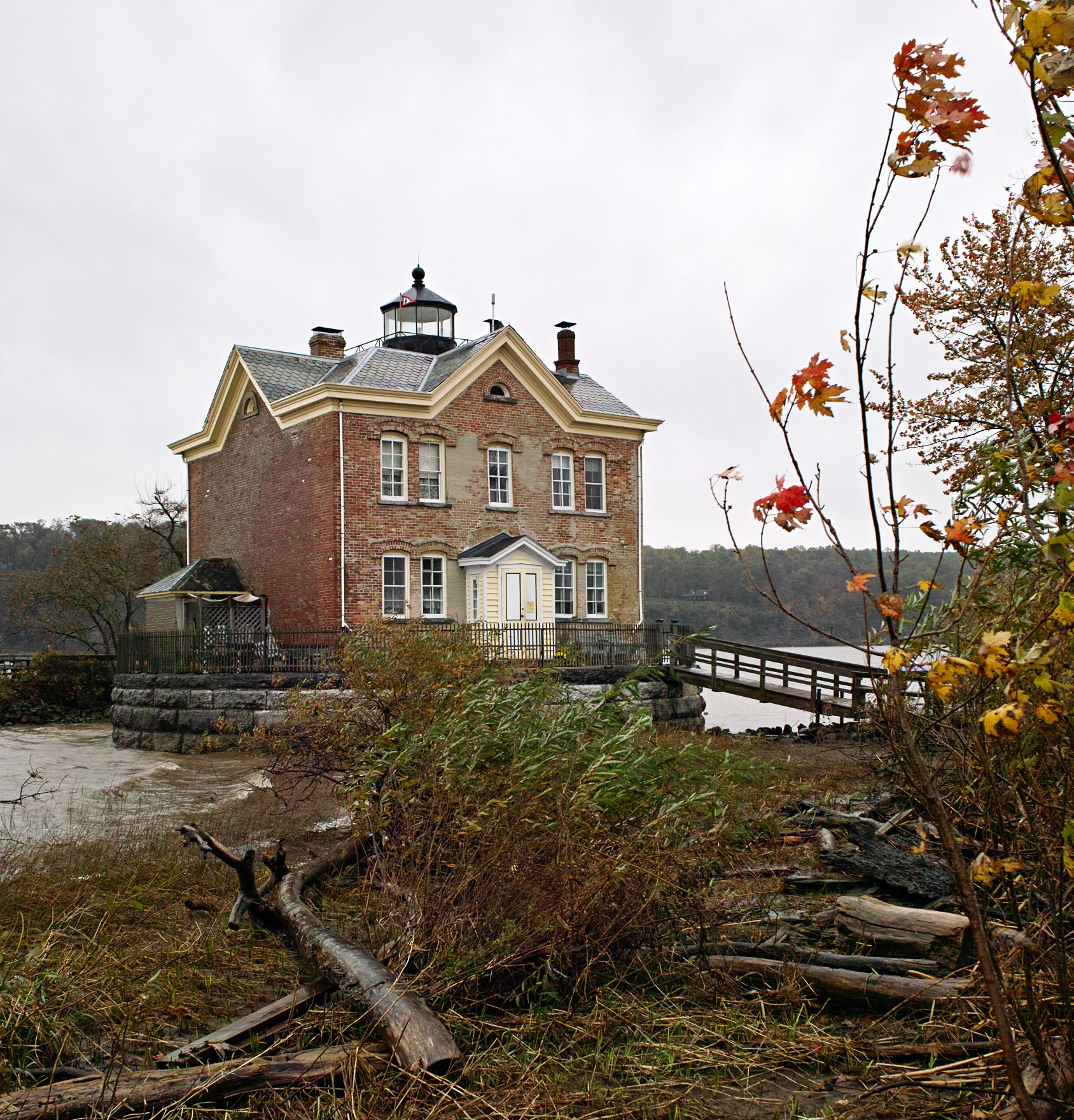
- Location: Hudson River at Esopus Creek, Saugerties, New York
- Coordinates: 42°4′19.53″N 73°55′46.72″W

Tower
- Constructed: 1869
- Foundation: Granite Block Crib
- Construction: Brick
- Automated: 1954
- Height: 46 feet (14 m)
- Shape: Square
- Markings: Natural w/ Black Lantern
- Heritage: National Register of Historic Places listed place

Light
- First lit: 1869
- Deactivated: 1954-1990
- Focal height: 42 feet (13 m)
- Lens: Sixth Order Fresnel lens
- Range: 5 nmi (9.3 km; 5.8 mi)
- Characteristic: Occulting White 4 seconds (Oc W 4s)
- Saugerties Lighthouse
- U.S. National Register of Historic Places
- Architectural style: Italianate
- MPS: Hudson River Lighthouses TR
- NRHP reference No.: 79001642
- Added to NRHP: May 29, 1979

Saugerties Light, known also as the Saugerties Lighthouse, is a lighthouse on the Hudson River north of Saugerties, New York.

== History ==
When it was built in 1869, it replaced the earlier 1838 lighthouse. Its Coast Guard service was ended in 1954. It is currently managed by the non-profit Saugerties Lighthouse Conservancy which purchased the lighthouse in 1986 and has restored it. The conservancy manages the nature trail leading to the lighthouse, offers two bed and breakfast rooms and public tours. A small museum displays artifacts of the original lighthouse and the restoration efforts, as well as the history of the Saugerties waterfront.

The lighthouse keeper of 1835 was Abraham Persons. He was paid $350 for the year.

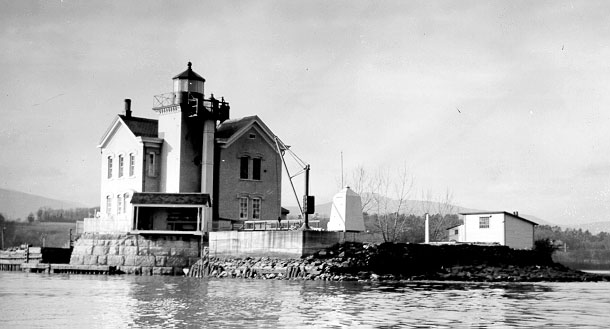
US Coast Guard photo

The US Coast Guard has identified Saugerties Light as one of its Historic Light Stations in New York.

Saugerties Light is shown on the NOAA Chart 12347.

== Cultural ==
The Archives Center at the Smithsonian National Museum of American History has a collection (#1055) of souvenir postcards of lighthouses and has digitized 272 of these and made them available online. These include postcards of Saugerties Light with links to customized nautical charts provided by National Oceanographic and Atmospheric Administration.

Saugerties Light is listed on the National Park Service's Maritime Heritage Program list of lighthouses to visit, and as one of New York's Historic Light Stations.
