= Main–Partition Streets Historic District =

Historic district in New York, United States

- U.S. National Register of Historic Places
- U.S. Historic district
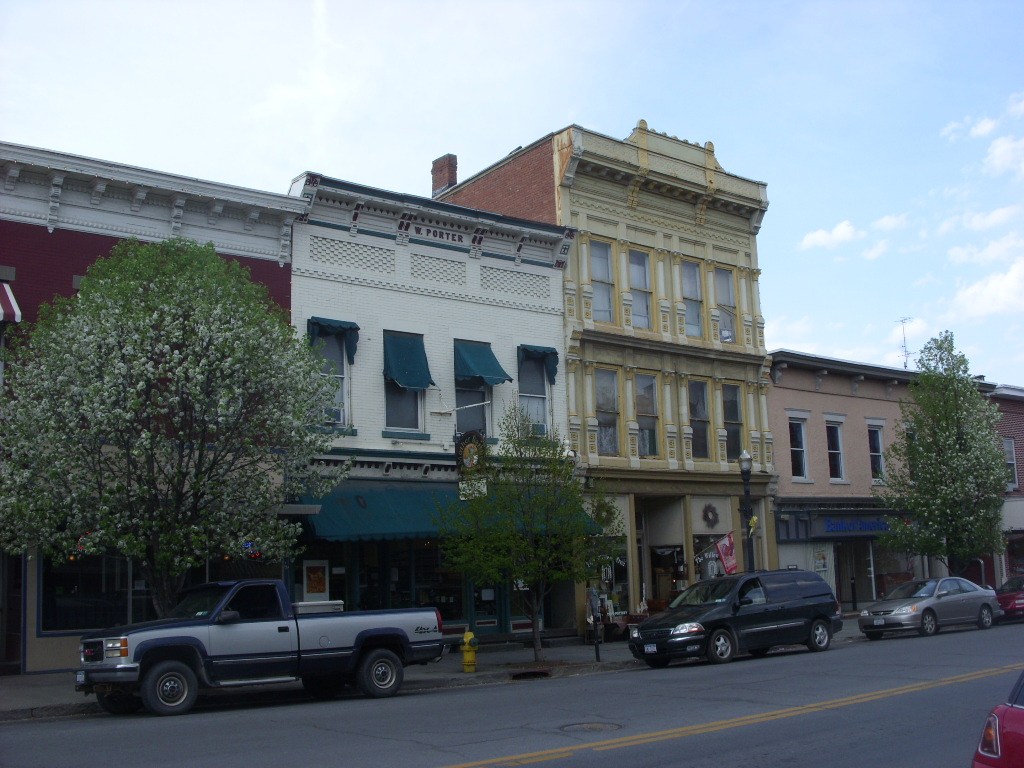
- Main-Partition Streets Historic District, April 2009

- Location within New York Location within the United States
- Location: Roughly bounded by Main, Partition, Market and Jane Sts., Saugerties, New York
- Coordinates: 42°4′37″N 73°57′10″W
- Area: 12 acres (4.9 ha)
- Built: 1780
- Architect: Multiple
- Architectural style: Late Victorian, Federal, Romanesque Revival
- NRHP reference No.: 82003411
- Added to NRHP: July 8, 1982

The Main–Partition Streets Historic District is located at Saugerties in Ulster County, New York. The district includes 78 contributing buildings. It encompasses the village's central business district. It includes a variety of two and three story, brick commercial buildings, two churches, a U.S. Post Office, three small dwellings, three 19th-century brick barns, a 19th-century frame barn, and a variety of outbuildings.

It was listed on the National Register of Historic Places in 1982.

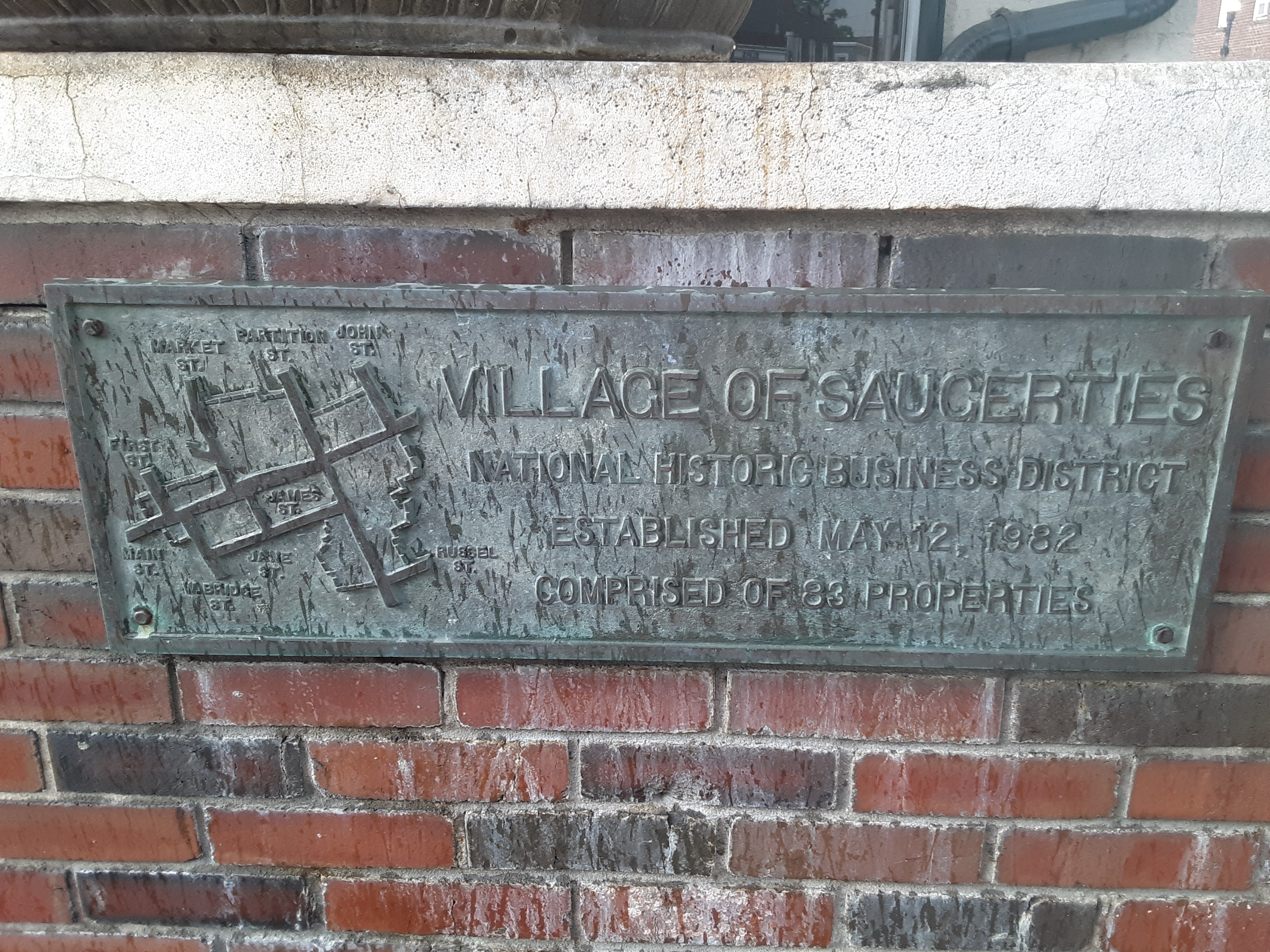
Historic District plaque

== See also ==
- National Register of Historic Places listings in Ulster County, New York
