= Saugerties (village), New York =

Village in Ulster County, New York, United States

Saugerties, New York
- Village
- Village of Saugerties
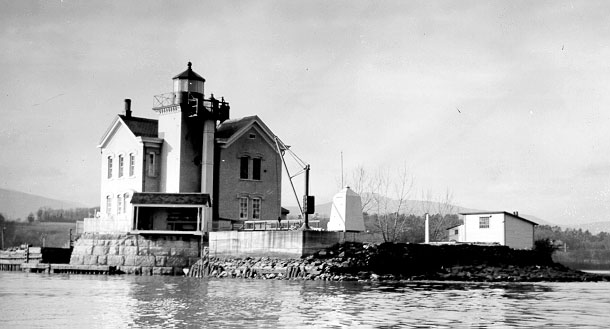
- Saugerties Light

- Location in Ulster County and the state of New York.
- Coordinates: 42°4′35″N 73°57′1″W
- Country: United States
- State: New York
- County: Ulster
- Incorporated: 1831

Area
  - Total: 2.26 sq mi (5.85 km^{2})
  - Land: 1.78 sq mi (4.62 km^{2})
  - Water: 0.47 sq mi (1.23 km^{2})
- Elevation: 154 ft (47 m)

Population (2020)
  - Total: 3,899
  - Density: 2,186.1/sq mi (844.07/km^{2})
- Time zone: UTC-5 (EST)
  - Summer (DST): UTC-4 (EDT)
- ZIP code: 12477
- Area code: 845
- FIPS code: 36-65288
- GNIS feature ID: 0964502
- Website: villageofsaugerties.gov

Saugerties (/ˈsɔːɡərtiːz/) is a village in Ulster County, New York, United States. The population was 3,899 at the 2020 census, showing a slight decline from the 3,971 counted at the 2010 census.

The Village of Saugerties is located on the west bank of the Hudson River, at the mouth of the Esopus Creek. It is in the eastern part of the Town of Saugerties. U.S. Route 9W and New York State Route 32 pass through the village, converging at its center and overlapping to the south. These routes parallel the New York State Thruway (Interstate 87), which passes through the town a mile west of the village.

== History ==
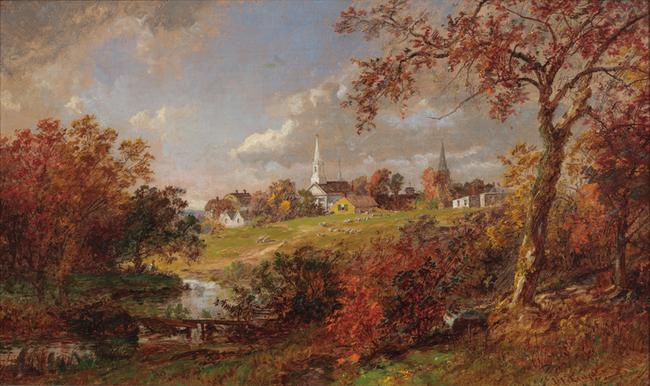
Jasper Francis Cropsey, Back of the Village, Saugerties, New York, 1886

In the 1650s, Barent Cornelis Volge operated a sawmill on the Sawyer's Kill, supplying lumber for the manor of Rensselaerswick. He had secured a title from the Esopus Sachem to this land sometime before 1663. The name Saugerties derives from "Zagertje", which means "Little Sawyer" in Dutch.

Circa 1685, George Meals and Richard Hayes purchased land on both sides of the Esopus Creek where it enters the Hudson River. Within two years, they sold the riverfront land to Barent Burhans, a miller whose granddaughter's husband, John Brink Jr., established a ferry across the river to Clermont, the seat of the Lower Livingston Manor.

John Persen was an early mill owner. He had both a sawmill and a gristmill; he also operated a ferry crossing the river to the east shore. He built the Mynderse House around 1685.

During the American Revolution, a British naval squadron lay at anchor at Saugerties from October 18–22, 1777, while raiding parties burned the Livingston estates of Clermont and Belvedere, across the Hudson River. Some of Benjamin Snyder's sloops were burned in Saugerties harbor as well.

The village was incorporated in 1831 as "Ulster," but it changed its name to "Saugerties" in 1855.

== Historical sites ==
- The Dubois-Kierstede Stone House is one of several stone buildings in Saugerties. Built in 1727, it houses the Kiersted House Museum.
- Main–Partition Streets Historic District

== Geography ==
Saugerties is located at 42°4′34″N 73°57′0″W (42.076282, -73.950219).

According to the United States Census Bureau, the village has a total area of 2.3 square miles (6.0 km^{2}), of which 1.8 square miles (4.7 km^{2}) is land and 0.4 square miles (1.0 km^{2}) (19.30%) is water.

The village is on the west bank of the Hudson River, where the Esopus Creek enters the Hudson.

== Demographics ==
Historical population
Census	Pop.	Note	%±
1870	3,731		—
1880	3,923		5.1%
1890	4,237		8.0%
1900	3,697		−12.7%
1910	3,929		6.3%
1920	4,013		2.1%
1930	4,060		1.2%
1940	3,916		−3.5%
1950	3,907		−0.2%
1960	4,286		9.7%
1970	4,190		−2.2%
1980	3,882		−7.4%
1990	3,915		0.9%
2000	3,955		1.0%
2010	3,971		0.4%
2020	3,899		−1.8%
U.S. Decennial Census

The population was 3,971 at the 2010 census. As of the census of 2000, there were 1,663 households, and 967 families residing in the village. The population density was 2,699.7 people per square mile (1,042.4 people/km^{2}). There were 1,887 housing units at an average density of 1,028.1 per square mile (397.0/km^{2}). The racial makeup of the village was 79.88% White, 12.15% Black or African American, 0.36% Native American, 1.39% Asian, 0.02% Pacific Islander, 5.13% from other races, and 1.07% from two or more races. Hispanic or Latino of any race were 11.85% of the population.

There were 1,663 households, out of which 30.5% had children under the age of 18 living with them, 37.9% were married couples living together, 16.1% had a female householder with no husband present, and 41.8% were non-families. 34.2% of all households were made up of individuals, and 15.2% had someone living alone who was 65 years of age or older. The average household size was 2.32 and the average family size was 3.01.

In the village, the population was spread out, with 19.9% under the age of 18, 11.1% from 18 to 24, 37.7% from 25 to 44, 19.1% from 45 to 64, and 12.3% who were 65 years of age or older. The median age was 36 years. For every 100 females, there were 140.2 males. For every 100 females age 18 and over, there were 148.7 males.

The median income for a household in the village was $35,525, and the median income for a family was $49,063. Males had a median income of $35,204 versus $23,333 for females. The per capita income for the village was $17,900. About 8.8% of families and 12.2% of the population were below the poverty line, including 16.1% of those under age 18 and 8.7% o those age 65 or over.

== Education ==
The village is in Saugerties Central School District. Saugerties High School is the zoned comprehensive high school.

The Roman Catholic Archdiocese of New York operates Catholic schools in Ulster County. St. Mary of the Snow School in Saugerties was founded by the Sisters of Charity in 1881. It closed in 2013. In 1995 the school had 153 students, while in 1999 it had 227 students; principal Christine Molinelli stated that she was able to successfully campaign to increase the enrollment in the 1990s. There were 89 students in 2013. Father Chris Berean stated that he had been able to convince 14 families to send their children to St. Mary of the Snow in 2013. St. Mary of the Snow was one of about twenty schools closed by the archdiocese.

== Notable people ==
- Francis Dolan Collins, U.S. Congressman for Pennsylvania's 11th district from 1875 to 1879
- Jimmy Fallon, actor and comedian, was raised in Saugerties after being born in Brooklyn, New York.
- Irving Fisher, hailed as "the greatest economist the United States has ever produced," was born in Saugerties.
- Edward M. Flanagan Jr., US Army lieutenant general, born and raised in Saugerties
- Roger Morse (1927–2000), bee biologist
- Anton Myrer, novelist
- Col. (Ret) Roger Donlon, the first Medal of Honor recipient of the Vietnam War, was born and raised in Saugerties.
- Joe Sinnott, comic book artist, was born in Saugerties and lived there most of his life.
