= James Basevi Ord =

US Army officer

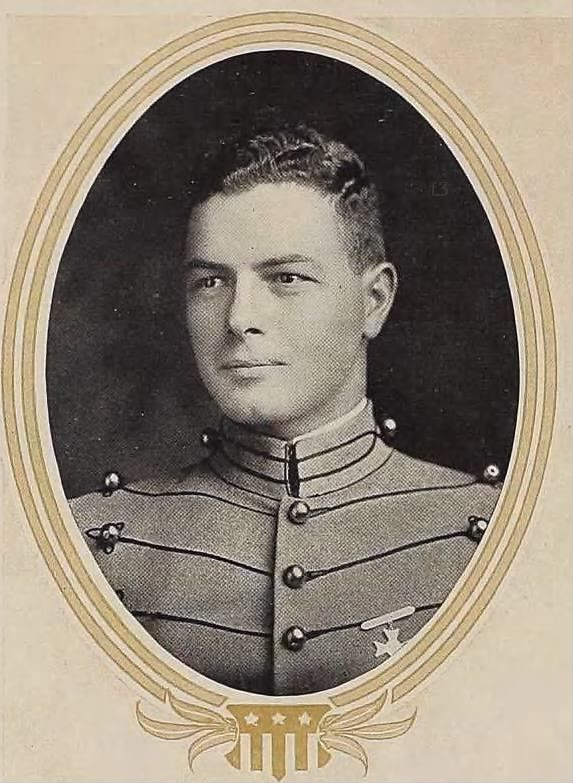
- Ord at West Point in 1915
- Born: 15 March 1892; Mexico
- Died: 30 January 1938 (aged 45); Baguio, Philippines
- Burial place: Arlington National Cemetery
- Military career
- Allegiance: United States
- Branch: United States Army
- Service years: 1915–1938
- Rank: Lieutenant Colonel
- Conflicts: World War I: Pancho Villa Expedition
- Awards: Distinguished Service Medal; Purple Heart; Distinguished Service Star (Philippines)

James Basevi Ord (15 March 1892 – 30 January 1938) was a United States Army lieutenant colonel killed in an air crash at Camp John Hay, Philippines. At the time, Ord was serving as the Assistant Military Advisor to the Commonwealth of the Philippines, under United States Military Advisor Douglas MacArthur. Ord was a member of the West Point class of 1915, "the class the stars fell on", that also included Omar Bradley and Dwight Eisenhower.

== Early life ==
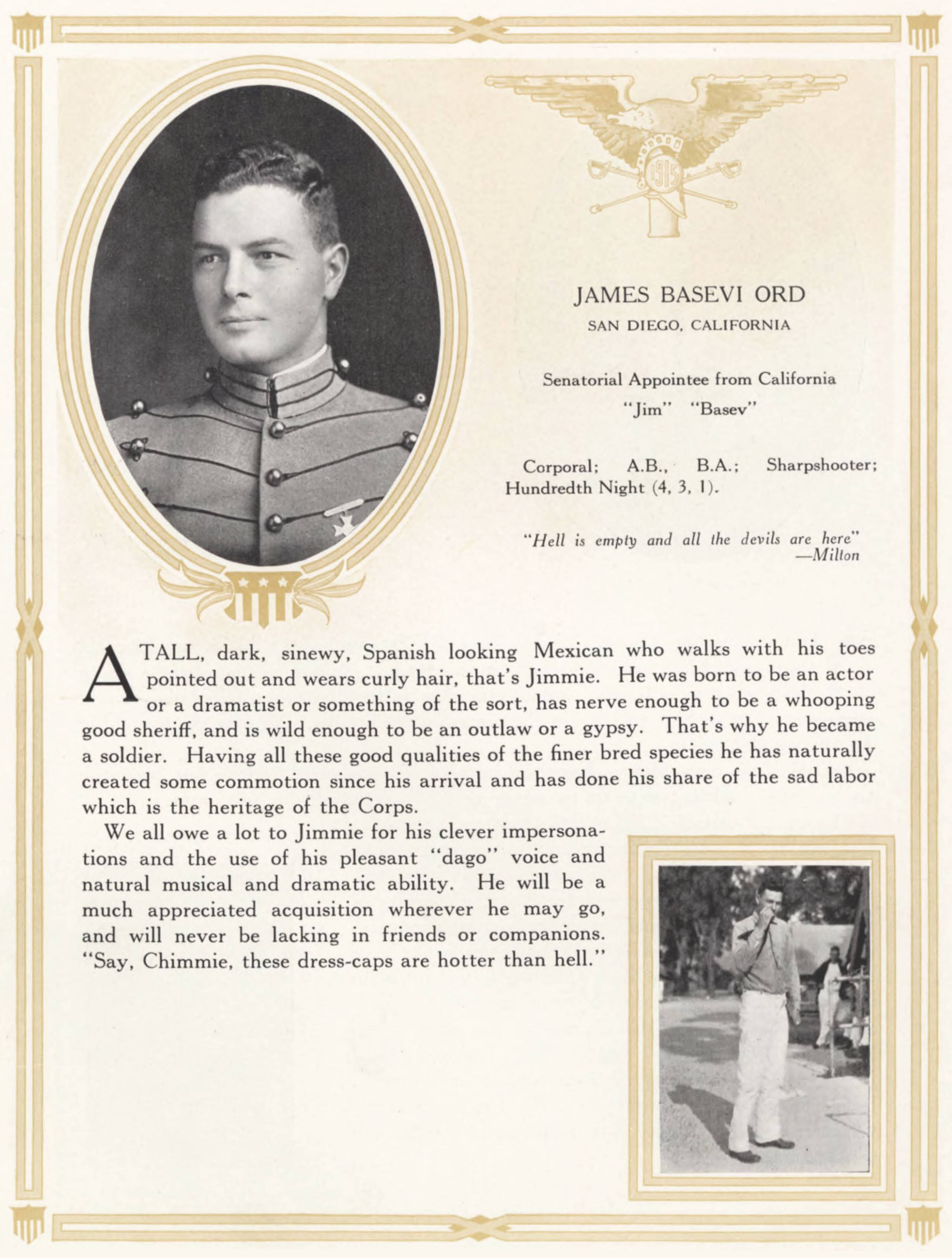
Ord in the United States Military Academy yearbook, 1915

James Basevi Ord was born in Mexico on 15 March 1892, the son of Captain James Thompson Ord and Rose Basevi. He came from a distinguished military family. He was the grandson of Major General Edward Otho Cresap Ord; Major Edward Otho Cresap Ord II was his uncle; and Major General James Garesche Ord was his cousin.

Ord received an appointment from California to the United States Military Academy at West Point, New York, which he entered on 12 June 1911. The class he joined would become famous as the class the stars fell on. Of the 164 graduates that year, 59 would wear the stars of a general officer, the most of any class in the history of the Academy. Classmates included Omar Bradley and Dwight Eisenhower.

== World War I ==
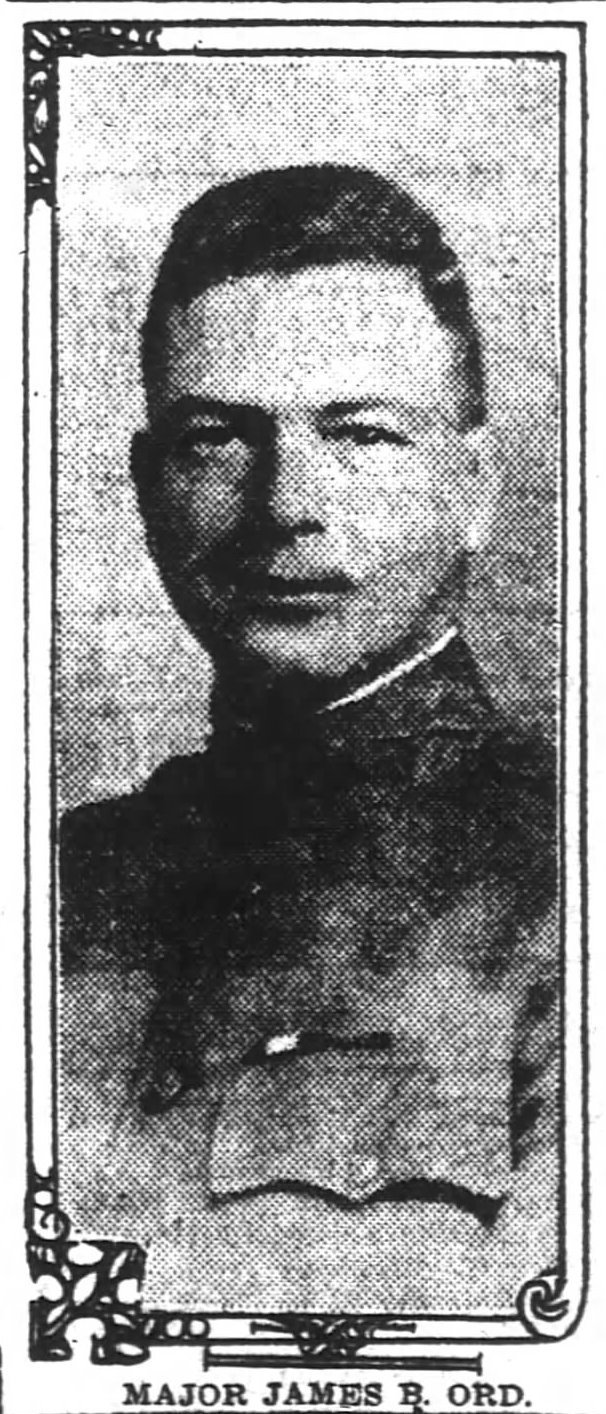
Ord in 1918

On 12 June 1915, Ord graduated 66th in his class, and was commissioned as a second lieutenant in the 6th Infantry. He was sent to Camp Cotton, in El Paso, Texas, where he joined the 13th Cavalry as an interpreter with the Pancho Villa Expedition. He was wounded in the Battle of Parral on 12 April 1916, and was recommended for the Medal of Honor, but instead received the Distinguished Service Medal. His citation read:

for exceptionally meritorious service to the Government in a duty of great responsibility, as follows: While serving as second lieutenant, 6th Infantry, attached to the 13th Cavalry, in action at Parral, Mexico, April 12, 1916, after being himself wounded, he dismounted from his horse under heavy fire, placed a wounded man on a horse, and assisted him from the field.

Ord was promoted to first lieutenant with the 5th Cavalry on 1 July 1916. He was attached the headquarters of the Punitive Expedition until it was disbanded on 10 February 1917. He was placed in charge of a refugee camp in Columbus, New Mexico, which subsequently moved to San Antonio, Texas. He was then posted to the 54th Infantry at Chickamauga Park, Georgia, on 24 June 1917. On 16 July 1917, he joined the staff of the Reserve Officer's Training Camp at Fort Oglethorpe, Georgia. Then, on 15 September 1917, he returned to West Point, initially as an instructor in modern languages, and then, from 20 September 1917, in tactics. From 18 May to 25 November 1918, he was an intelligence officer and Assistant Military Attaché in The Hague. He was awarded the Order of Orange-Nassau.

== Between the wars ==
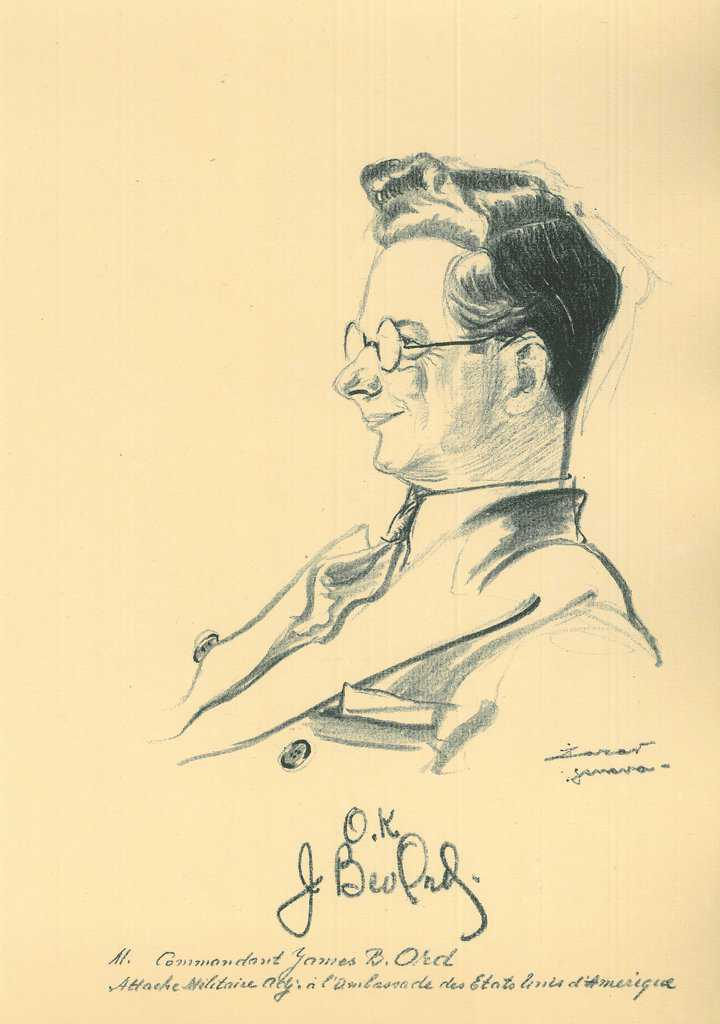
Portrait by Oscar Lazar, 1932

Promoted to major on 17 June 1918, Ord reverted to the grade of captain on 30 June 1920, only to return to being a major two days later. He attended the Ecole Supérieure de Guerre in Paris. Returning to the United States in July 1924. He reverted to captain again on 4 November 1922, but then was promoted to major again on 20 September 1924. From June 1925 to June 1926 he was a student at the Command and General Staff School at Fort Leavenworth, Kansas. After graduation, he was posted to the Philippines, as commander of the 3rd Battalion, 31st Infantry, and then, in May 1928, to the American Embassy in Paris as Assistant Military Attaché. He was technical adviser at the Army General Disarmament Conference, in Geneva, Switzerland, from 2 February to 19 June 1932.

Ord attended the Army War College from 1932 to 1933, and then was an instructor in military intelligence there from 1933 to 1935. That year, the outgoing Chief of Staff of the United States Army, Major General Douglas MacArthur, was appointed Military Advisor to the Commonwealth of the Philippines. MacArthur was permitted to select his own staff, so as his chief of staff, he chose Dwight Eisenhower, who had been his assistant for the previous two and a half years. In turn, Eisenhower was permitted to choose his own assistant, and he chose Ord for his staff skills and his knowledge of Spanish. MacArthur had previously been acquainted with Ord in Paris when MacArthur was Chief of Staff.

== Death ==
Ord was promoted to lieutenant colonel on 1 July 1936. His main responsibility was to draw up a military budget for the Philippines. A realistic one proved difficult to create, as the United States government would not supply the funding for the equipment that MacArthur and Eisenhower believed that the Philippines would require in order to resist a Japanese invasion. A key part of this was the fledgling Philippine Air Corps. On 30 January 1938, Ord took off on a flight to Baguio with a Filipino student pilot at the controls. As the plane approached its destination, Ord had the pilot fly low over a friend's house so he could drop a note announcing his arrival tied to a rock. The inexperienced pilot stalled the plane and it crashed, killing Ord. President Manuel Quezon awarded Ord the Distinguished Service Star. His citation read:

As one of the principal assistants of the Military Adviser Colonel Ord continuously, from the inauguration of the Commonwealth to the moment of his untimely death, devoted his exceptional talents to the development of adequate security forces for the Philippines. Through his professional attainments, his breadth of understanding, his zeal and his magnetic leadership he was directly responsible for notable progress in the Philippine Army. Through his outstanding achievements, in the service of the Philippine Government, to which service he gave his life, he increased the brilliance of his already enviable military reputation, became an inspiration to the officers and enlisted men of the Army, and earned the gratitude and affection of the Philippine Government and of the Filipino people.

Upon his death, Ord was replaced by Lieutenant Colonel Richard K. Sutherland. Ord was buried in Arlington National Cemetery, not far from his father and other members of his family. He was survived by his wife, Emily Collier Howell, and his two children, James Basevi Ord, Jr., and Letitia Howell Ord. James Jr. subsequently became a colonel in the United States Marine Corps. He married Virginia Cartwright Shepherd, the daughter of General Lemuel C. Shepherd, Jr., a Commandant of the Marine Corps.
