= General Ord (disambiguation) =

Edward Ord (1818–1883) was a U.S. Army major general. General Ord may also refer to:

- Harry Ord (1819–1885), British Army major general
- James Garesche Ord (1886–1960), U.S. Army major general
- Robert L. Ord III (born 1940), U.S. Army lieutenant general
