= John Bigelow Jr. =

United States Army officer (1854–1936)

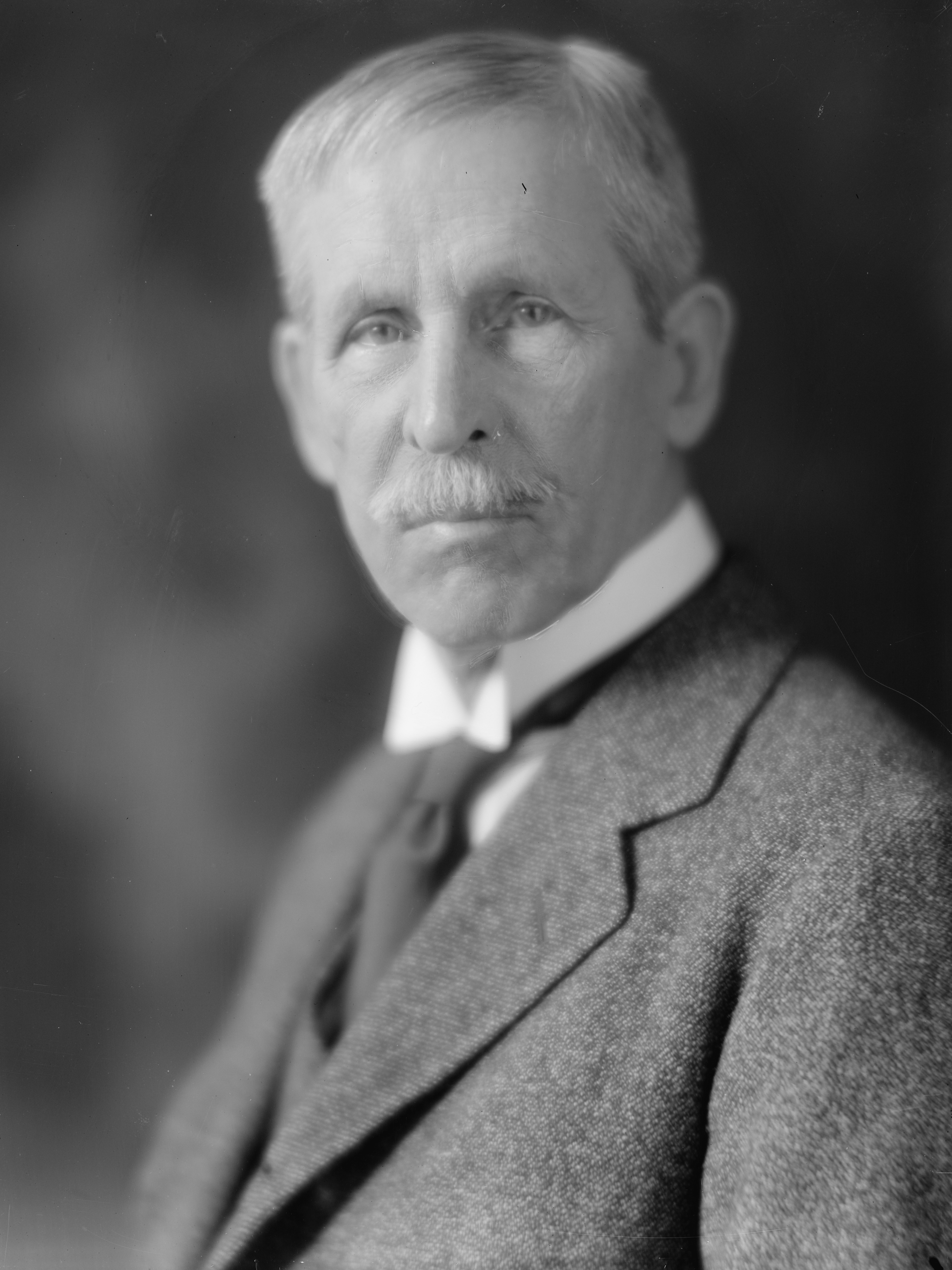
- Bigelow, 1905–1936
- Born: May 12, 1854; New York City, New York
- Died: February 29, 1936 (aged 81); Washington, District of Columbia
- Relatives: John Bigelow (father); Poultney Bigelow (brother)
- Military career
- Allegiance: United States of America
- Branch: Department of War–Army
- Service years: 1877–1904 & 1917–1919
- Rank: Lieutenant Colonel
- Conflicts: Indian Wars; Spanish–American War; World War I
- Awards: Silver Star; Purple Heart
- Other work: Teacher and writer

John Bigelow Jr. (May 12, 1854 – February 29, 1936) was a United States Army lieutenant colonel. He was the subject of many articles on military frontier life in Outing Magazine published by his brother Poultney Bigelow and with sketches drawn in the field by the then young and obscure Frederic Remington. The book Frontier Cavalryman is based on his journals and service with the Buffalo Soldiers. He received a Silver Star and a Purple Heart for his actions in Cuba. He was assigned as a superintendent of Yosemite National Park in early 1904 and retired from the Army the following September. He became a teacher at the Massachusetts Institute of Technology and later an author of several books. He was recalled to active duty in World War I and served in Washington, District of Columbia until 1919. He retired again and died in 1936 at age 81.

== Early life and family ==
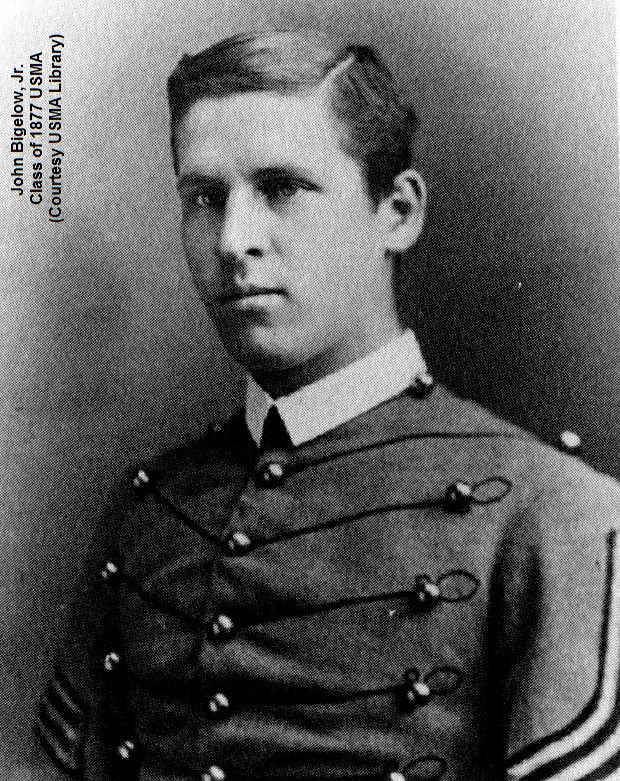
Bigelow as a Cadet at United States Military Academy

John Bigelow Jr. was the eldest of the two sons of the statesman John Bigelow and Jane Tunis Poultney born in New York City, New York. He spent much of his early years in France and Germany. At the Mining Academy of Freiberg/Saxony he became a member of the fraternity Montania. He traveled throughout Europe with his parents. He became fluent in the French language as well as having a general understanding of German and Italian.

On April 28, 1883 he married Mary Dallam (July 24, 1858 Baltimore, Maryland – about 1941) and they had one son and several daughters of which only one survived him. Their son, Captain Braxton Bigelow was killed in action in 1917 while serving with the British Royal Engineers near Loos.

== Indian Wars and frontier service ==
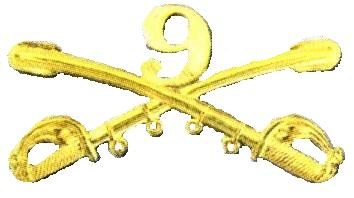
9th Regiment United States Cavalry insignia

Bigelow was appointed from New York and graduated from the United States Military Academy at West Point, New York in 1877. He requested cavalry and was assigned to the 10th U.S. Cavalry but served with the 9th U.S. Cavalry for a time before going back to the 10th. While at the Military Academy Bigelow met Henry Ossian Flipper a classmate who had been born a slave. Bigelow faced for the first time the racism then prevailing in America. His upbringing in Europe did not prepare him for such hatred. His efforts to explain what he saw in Europe only inflamed other racists. With subtle help from his peers, Flipper was the first "negro" to graduate from West Point.

=== 9th Cavalry Regiment–The Buffalo Soldiers ===
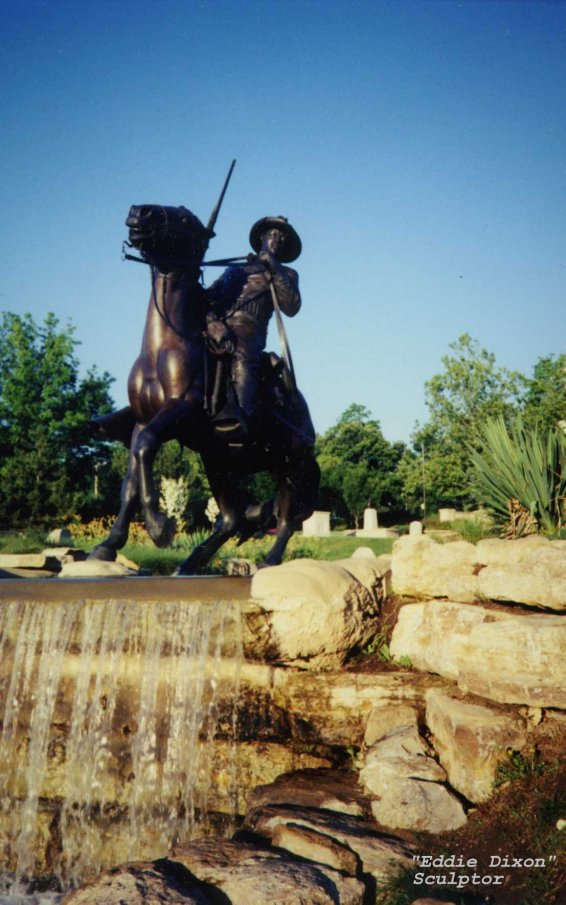
The Buffalo Soldier Monument at Fort Leavenworth, Kansas. It honors the African-Americans troopers and those who led them.

After the Civil War two regiments of "Negro Troops" were raised for cavalry service on the frontier. These were the 9th Cavalry and the 10th U.S. Cavalry. By 1877 the regiments led by white officers were veterans of Indian Warfare and frontier life. Bigelow, later with the 10th Cavalry, wrote historical sketches for these Buffalo Soldiers which are still used today as a reference.

On December 14, 1877, the young Bigelow reported for duty at Fort Duncan in West Texas. He was assigned to Company B, 9th Cavalry. In time he learned to become a cavalry trooper. His handsome looks turned many a lady's head and he left many broken hearts behind him. His language skills and presentation were also a plus for him. His journals and sketches created a colorful portrait of his frontier service.

In 1877 the 9th Cavalry were in the New Mexico Military District, which covered parts of New Mexico, Colorado and Texas. Bigelow had participated in the later part of the Apache Wars dated from 1875 to 1881. His service included the Battle of Tularosa with Chiricahua Apache warriors led by Victorio in May 1880. In 1881 the 9th were transferred east to Fort Riley, Kansas. But Bigelow was transferred to the 10th U.S. Cavalry and in October 1882 he is at Fort Davis in Texas.

=== 10th Cavalry Regiment ===
In the spring of 1885 the 10th left Fort Davis for the Department of Arizona. While en route, the widely scattered troops began to come together and formed a full regiment of 12 troops for the first and only time in its history. Bigelow stated it was a sight to see and would never be seen again. On May 20, 1885, the regiment reached its new headquarters at Fort Apache, Arizona territory. Within weeks they were headed to various isolated posts and forts for duty.

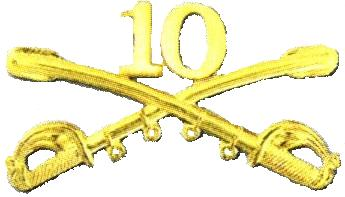
10th Regiment United States Cavalry insignia

In the mid-1880s the hunt for Geronimo was on and Bigelow was involved with the search, patrolling out of Fort Grant. Many patrols were carried out and the public's attention was drawn to the hunt. Harper's Weekly sent a young Frederic Remington out to document the historic events. While Remington went out with various cavalry troops of the 10th, he met a friend of an old friend in the dusty west. Bigelow's brother Poultney Bigelow was a former Yale classmate of Remington and had remained in contact with him. This started a friendship which would last for decades. Bigelow allowed Remington to read his journals and see his sketches. While Bigelow never became proficient in his sketches, his journals became the basis of serial articles on the hunt for Geronimo for his brother's Outing magazine. Remington added a series of freelance sketches for the magazine that included his new friend, John Bigelow.

Bigelow, now tough and leaner in stature, with a regimental approved mustache, from his tenure on the frontier had become a teacher to Remington regarding the cavalry and the tools of the trade. Bigelow teased his friend about his British-style pith helmet. He gave his friend a quiver of Apache hunting arrows and its bow that he had recovered from the field. Remington made dozens of sketches that often focused on what Bigelow did and often inserted himself in his own sketches. In 1889 Remington would publish some of his sketches and tell of what it was like going on a "scout" with the Buffalo Soldiers. The tall lean frame and face of Bigelow can be seen in many of Remington's later paintings and artistic works. Unfortunately this caused some problems for Bigelow. Not only did some officers become jealous of the attention given to Bigelow, but many women, married and single, competed for his attention. Bigelow had many a close call toward the state of matrimony, but improved his Spanish skills. On at least two occasions his "notoriety" caused him delay in returning to his command because of the "need" for him to attend a party while in transit at some frontier posting.

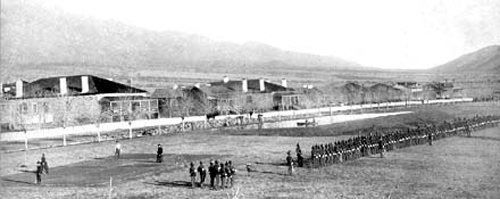
Fort Grant, c. 1885.

While the prize of capturing Geronimo in September 1886 went to Captain Henry Lawton, in command of B Troop, 4th Cavalry, the 10th Cavalry had drawn their part of the noose tight to make it happen. Bigelow and his troop were part of the escort taking Geronimo to the railroad station for his imprisonment back east.

In 1891, The headquarters for the 10th was moved to Fort Grant. Bigelow was listed as the Regimental Quartermaster. There he would write a brief history of the 10th Cavalry which became part of the United States Military historic record.

=== Late career and Spanish–American War ===
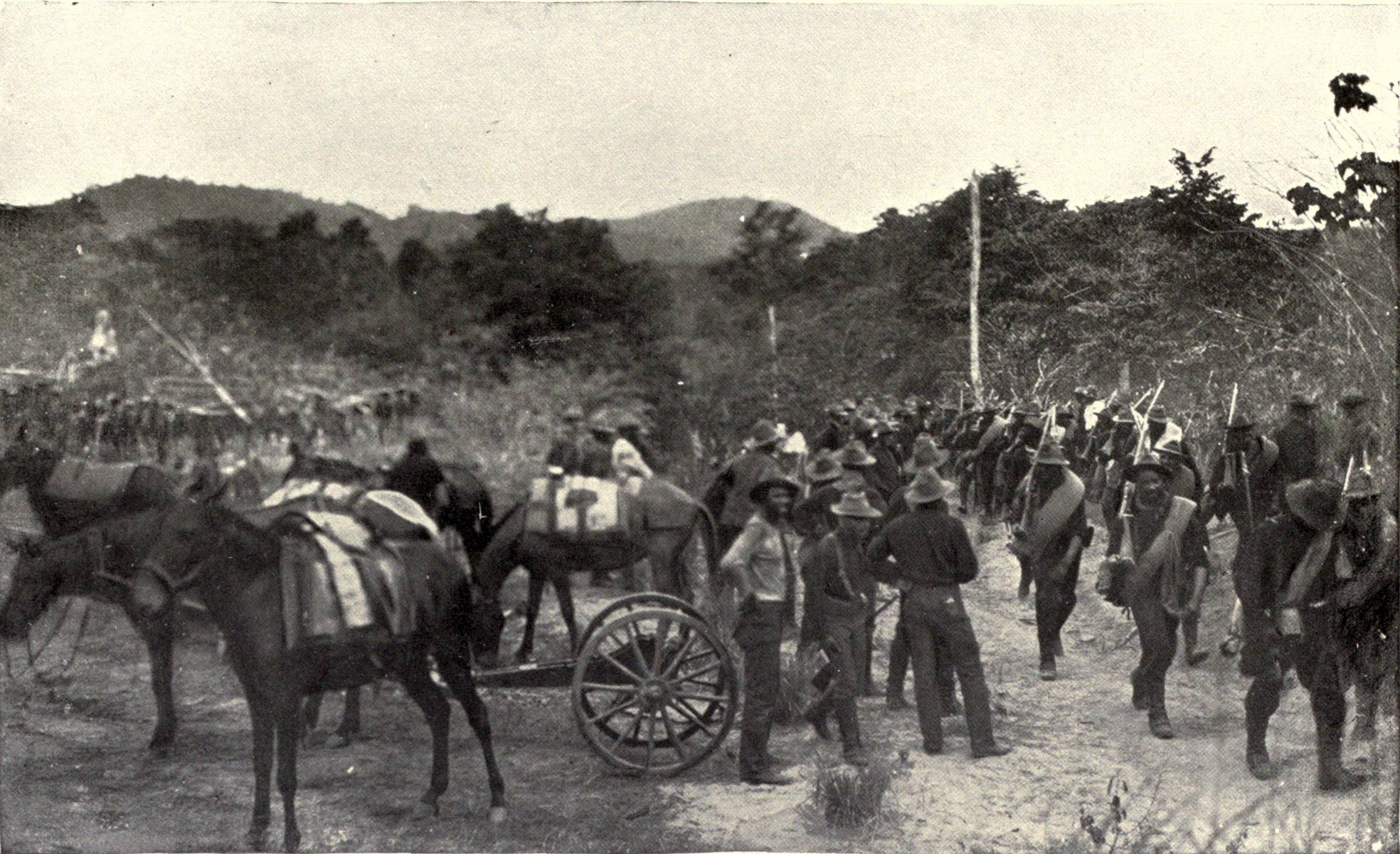
"On the battleground of Las Guasimas" - American Buffalo Soldiers of the 10th Cavalry going to the front" in Harper's Pictorial History of the War with Spain, Vol. II, 1899.

In late June 1898, Captain Bigelow in command of D Troop, 10th Cavalry landed in Cuba. The harsh jungle conditions were hard on him and his men. His unit was part of the Cavalry Division's Second Brigade which included the 1st Volunteer Cavalry later led by Lt. Colonel Theodore Roosevelt and was in the thick of the fighting. Three principal battles were fought by this brigade on the approach to the principal city of Santiago de Cuba.

The first of these were the Battle of Las Guasimas on June 24, 1898, where Bigelow and the 10th Cavalry saved a portion of the Rough Riders from annihilation when their lead companies were ambushed and pinned down. This was where Harper's Weekly war correspondent Frederic Remington experienced the true horror of combat and heard the whistle of bullets near his head. Remington later painted the "Scream of the Shrapnel" in 1899 that represented this event.

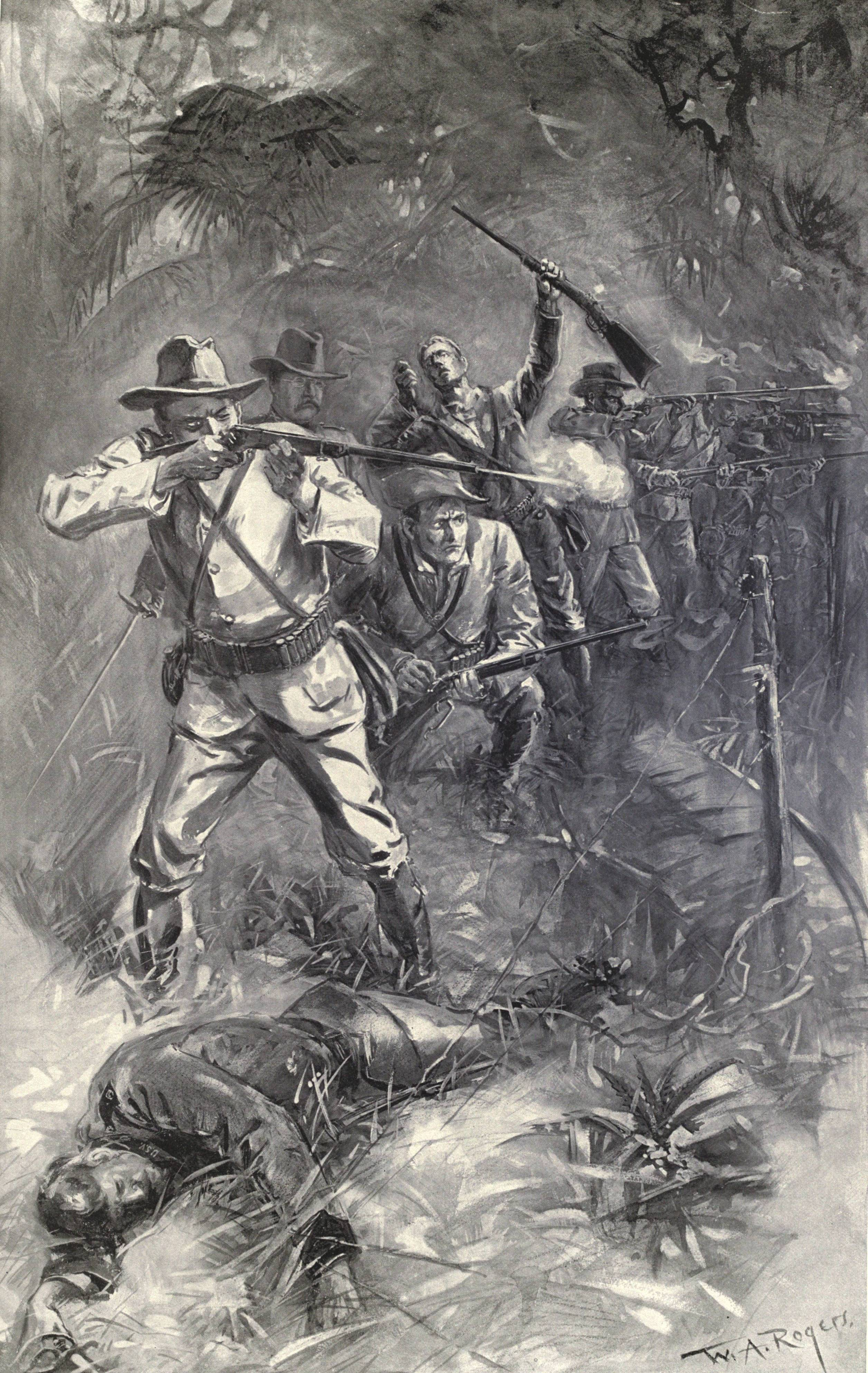
"The Battle of Las Guasimas, June 24 - The heroic stand of the 'Rough Riders'" in Harper's Pictorial History of the War with Spain, 1899.

The second was the Battle of El Caney in the early morning hours of July 1 where stubborn Spanish forces held the Americans at bay for almost twelve hours. Then came infamous or famous Battle of San Juan Hill in the late afternoon.

Bigelow was in a quandary. His troops and others were receiving fire from the San Juan Heights that was fortified by the Spanish defenders. Other units went into position on the left and the right. But still no orders to advance came. Bigelow's second in command, First Lieutenant Jules Garesche Ord, son of General Otho Cresap Ord, was sent to Brigadier General Hamilton S. Hawkins asking permission to attack. Hawkins refused to give permission but did not deny it either. En route back to the company, Ord passed by the different units including Roosevelt's Rough Riders and asked them to support the regulars when they went up the hill.

Captain Bigelow led his soldiers up the steep slopes to the heights of San Juan Hill. Advancing through blistering fire, Bigelow was hit but continued to urge his men forward. Just past the midway point he was hit in quick succession by three Spanish bullets which caused him to fall. Several soldiers present reported that he encouraged them with, "Men, don't stop for me, just keep up the charge until you get to the top of the hill." His men did so and were able to provide covering fire for those attacking adjacent to them.

Bigelow's second in command, Jules Ord, reached the top and began directing supporting fire when he was hit in the throat and mortally wounded. On that one day and one place, one half of the 10th's officers and one-fifth of its soldiers became casualties. First Lieutenant John J. Pershing, quartermaster of the 10th, took over command of D Troop. Pershing had helped lead the charge up Kettle Hill with the right flank of the 10th.

Bigelow was awarded the Silver Star for his actions on San Juan Hill. In August 1899, he turned down a lieutenant colonelcy with a volunteer regiment to stay with the 10th. This act was perceived as a snub. It took many months for him to recover from his wounds and he found himself back in Cuba in 1899. He spent the next three years investigating Spanish war claims there.

== Massachusetts Institute of Technology ==
From 1894 to 1898 Bigelow was a professor of Military Science and Tactics at the Massachusetts Institute of Technology (MIT).

Bigelow used the campaign of Chancellorsville in his lectures "'….because that campaign presented a greater variety of military problems and experiences than any other in which an army of the United States had taken part.' In addition, he added, no other battle approaching Chancellorsville 'in importance, has been so imperfectly apprehended and described.'" Bigelow published his research on Chancellorsville in the book The Campaign of Chancellorsville: A Strategic and Tactical Study published by Yale University Press in 1910 and reissued in the 1990s by Morningside Press. This 528-page publication set a high standard for military publications of its kind. He is noted as bringing "the highest zeal and intelligence" to his teaching at MIT.

From 1905 to 1910 he was again at MIT as a professor of French and was also the head of the Department of Modern Languages.

== Superintendent of Yosemite National Park ==
Returning to the United States, he was shuffled from one fort to another each further westward until he reached the Presidio of San Francisco in later part of 1903. His repeated efforts for an active command fell on deaf ears.

In 1904 he became the superintendent of Yosemite National Park which was then considered a retirement posting. Once again he served with elements of the 9th Cavalry Buffalo Soldiers.

In early 1904, Bigelow ordered an arboretum on the South Fork of the Merced then in the southern section of Yosemite National Park. This arboretum had pathways and benches, and some plants were identified in both English and Latin. This "Pioneer attempt" to interpret the botanical features of Yosemite was 16 years before Dr. Harold C. Bryant's nature guiding service which became the nucleus of the interpretive program for the National Park Service. Dr. Bryant was inspired by Joseph Grinnell who cited Bigelow's arboretum in his 1914 work on Yosemite.

Yosemite's arboretum is considered by the National Park System to be the first museum. The NPS cites a 1904 report, where Bigelow declared the arboretum "To provide a great museum of nature for the general public free of cost ..." Unfortunately, the forces of developers, miners and greed cut the boundaries of Yosemite in 1905 and the arboretum was nearly destroyed.

Bigelow and his Buffalo Soldiers, as military stewards, were some of the first "Park Rangers" that protected the national parks from illegal grazing, poaching, timber thieves, and forest fires. But they and their leaders came against those who influence or control politics, the soldiers followed their orders and allowed "progress."

Bigelow became more aware that he had become "persona non grata" for his staunch support for the black Buffalo Soldiers. Seeing the winds of change shrinking Yosemite and Claiming ill health, he retired from the army in late September 1904. Then he headed east toward home where he would write and teach.

== Retirement ==
Bigelow's retirement from the Army did not stop him from working. He became a professor of French and the head of the Department of Modern Languages at the Massachusetts Institute of Technology from 1905 to 1910. Afterward he devoted himself to studying strategy, tactics and international relations. He wrote several books on these subjects (e.g. American Policy: The Western Hemisphere in its Relation to the Eastern). His efforts to become a foreign statesman like his father was turned down. His unintentional snubbing of Teddy Roosevelt in 1899 and undaunted support for black troops continued to prevent him from serving his country like his father.

In 1914 when war broke out in Europe, he redoubled his effort to join the diplomatic corps and when that failed, he offered to serve in any capacity. As America was dragged into World War I, Bigelow was recalled to active duty on July 24, 1917. Again he was denied an active command and served at Rutgers and in the War Department's Historical Branch until his release on July 5, 1919 shortly after being promoted to lieutenant colonel.

He and his wife Mary suffered a tremendous loss in 1917. Their only son, Braxton had been killed in action while serving with the British near Loos. Braxton decided to get in the war early and in 1915 became an officer in the British Royal Engineers. By the time of his death he was a Captain and had received many awards for his service.

After the war years, Bigelow and his wife traveled to Europe with their daughter Jane. They visited the grave of their son and he explored the possibility of serving with the British. Discouraged by what he saw in Europe he returned home. On February 29, 1936 with war looming once again in Europe he died at home in Washington, D. C. Bigelow was interred at Arlington National Cemetery on March 3, 1936.

== Honors and awards ==
During his military career, Bigelow earned the Silver Star while attacking up San Juan Hill in Cuba. He received a Purple Heart for his four wounds received there.

=== Military promotions ===
Lieutenant Colonel	Major	Captain	First Lieutenant	Second Lieutenant
O-5	O-4	O-3	O-2	O-1
June 22, 1919	December 8, 1902	April 15, 1893	September 24, 1883	June 15, 1877

== Publications ==
- The Principles of Strategy, Illustrated Mainly from American Campaigns. Philadelphia: Lippincott Co., 1894.
- Reminiscences of the Santiago Campaign. New York and London: Harper & Brothers Publishers, 1899.
- The Campaign of Chancellorsville: A Strategic and Tactical Study. New Haven: Yale University Press, 1910.

== See also ==
- Jules Garesche Ord
- Battle of San Juan Hill
- Delayed after action report of D Troop by Bigelow on December 18, 1898.
- After action report of D Troop by A. E. Kennington.
