= Jules Garesche Ord =

United States Army general (1866–1898)

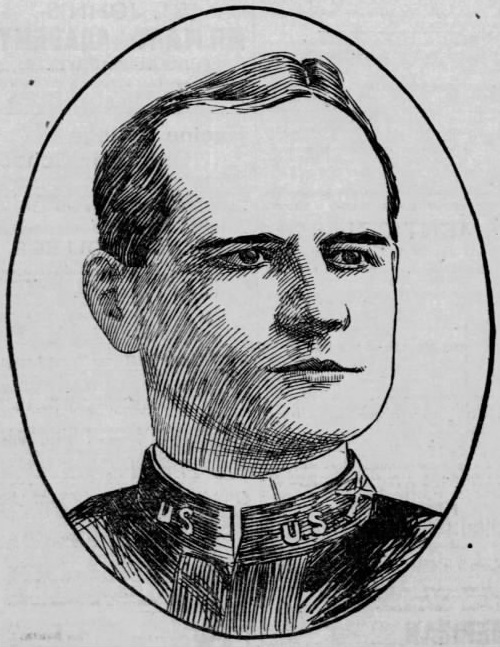
- Chicago Tribune, August 8, 1898
- Born: September 9, 1866; Michigan, US
- Died: July 1, 1898 (aged 31); San Juan Hill, near Santiago, Cuba
- Burial place: Arlington National Cemetery
- Relatives: Edward Ord, father Edward Otho Cresap Ord, II, brother James Garesche Ord (nephew)
- Military career
- Allegiance: United States of America
- Branch: Department of War–Army
- Service years: 1887–1898
- Rank: First Lieutenant
- Nickname: Gary
- Conflicts: Indian Wars; Spanish–American War

Jules Garesche "Gary" Ord (September 9, 1866 – July 1, 1898) was a United States Army First Lieutenant who was killed in action after leading the charge of Buffalo Soldiers of the 10th U.S. Cavalry up San Juan Hill. History now records that Ord was responsible for the "spontaneous" charge that took the San Juan Heights during the Spanish–American War in Cuba on July 1, 1898.

== Early life ==
Young Garesche, as he was known to his parents, was the youngest surviving son of 15 children and born in Michigan in 1866. His father, the then Captain Edward Otho Cresap Ord (1818–1883), married Mary Mercer Thompson (1831–1894) in 1854. His father was a career military officer who was a hero in the Civil War and had served as a Major General of Volunteers. After the war, he reverted to being a Brigadier General in the Regular Army.

On August 2, 1870 the family was in San Francisco, California with seven children. Young Garesche lived with servants and was taught by tutors. His life in the west was one of which his father was a senior military officer, a decorated Civil War hero and he was doted upon by his mother. His life was privileged compared to others. As he grew up he watched both military officers and men show respect and courtesy to his parents.

By June 1880 the family was in San Antonio, Bexar County, Texas. His father was the Commanding General of the Department of Texas. His elder brother James was at the United States Military Academy at West Point, New York. His father retired from the Army on December 6, 1880 after serving 41 years. His father began a second career that built the Mexican Southern Railroad from Texas to Mexico City. The family stayed in San Antonio.

Garesche became known as "Gary", got into some minor trouble and struggled with school. In July 1883 his father died in Havana, Cuba of yellow fever while en route from Vera Cruz, Mexico to New York City. The family went back to Washington, D.C. for the funeral and an extended visit. By late 1886 young Ord was back in San Antonio.

On August 16, 1887 Gary received and turned down an appointment to West Point. Why he did this is not clear. He then walked into the Army Post and enlisted as "Gary Ordish."

== Military service ==
Ord enlisted as an Army Private on August 16, 1887 and it became known who he was due to his mother's visit to the post. He struggled but his leadership abilities were quickly seen. He rose through the ranks until he was a Quartermaster Sergeant. He was with the 1st United States Infantry until November 9, 1890.

He took and passed a two-day exam in which he received a commission to Second Lieutenant with the 18th United States Infantry effective on November 6, 1890. He served well and he was promoted to First Lieutenant, 6th United States Infantry on August 7, 1897. He volunteered for duty in the 1898 Spanish–American War and was sent there with the 6th Infantry Regiment avoiding recruitment duty stateside. Ord then became a brigade staff officer (aide-de-camp) under Brigadier General Hamilton S. Hawkins who then commanded the 1st Brigade, 1st Division, V Corps in Cuba. Due to disease and other casualties many staff officers were directed to serve with the line units. Ord, wanting to be "in the action" asked to be sent to D Troop of the "negro" 10th U.S. Cavalry where a family friend was in command, John Bigelow Jr. whose diplomat father John Bigelow had been a close friend with Ord's father General Otho Cresap Ord. John Bigelow had once dated Ord's elder sister Roberta (Bertie) and despite encouragements from both families the relationship waned. Before his final battle during a lull, Ord told Bigelow that he would come out of this battle either as a "colonel or a corpse."

== Battle of San Juan Hill ==
The San Juan Heights with San Juan Hill and its main blockhouses were the highest point with a dip or draw in between another smaller hill later called Kettle Hill. These heights were aligned in a north-south axis and located about a mile east of Santiago. They were the last major obstacle before the Americans.

=== Myths of the battle ===
The Rough Riders under Colonel Theodore Roosevelt would claim to have taken Kettle Hill on the American right with assistance from several troops of the "black" 10th Cavalry and the entire 3rd Cavalry ("white" volunteers). The reality was that "the regulars" were supported by the 3rd & Roosevelt's 1st in taking the hill. Most of the 10th supported by elements of the 24th and 25th colored infantry on the left would take San Juan Hill, which was the main Spanish defensive position with several block houses. The 10th held the center position between the two hills and when they went forward the command would be split headed toward the tops of both hills.

Roosevelt claimed he started the charge on the right up Kettle Hill, but in reality he supported "the regulars" in the charge up the hill after being asked to by Lt. Ord. When the Spanish soldiers withdrew from Kettle Hill toward San Juan Hill, which was still being contested, the regulars (the black troops) fired toward them. They did this in support of their comrades fighting on the adjacent hill. When Roosevelt tried to direct his volunteers down and across the steep draw to San Juan Hill, his men balked. Later came the myth that "the regulars" would not obey Roosevelt and caused a delay in taking San Juan Hill. Another so called myth stated that the Rough Riders alone took the Kettle Hill. This is not true. Sergeant George Berry of the 10th took his regimental colors and that of the 3rd Cavalry's colors to the top of Kettle Hill before the Rough Riders' flag arrived. This is supported in the writings of John J. "Black Jack" Pershing who fought with the 10th to the top of Kettle Hill and was present when Roosevelt arrived. Later Roosevelt would lead some of his men down and around toward the main heights. He was intercepted by General Summers and ordered back to Kettle Hill to prepare for a counterattack by the Spanish. When the counterattack came, those men he led were exhausted from the heat.

=== The main attack ===
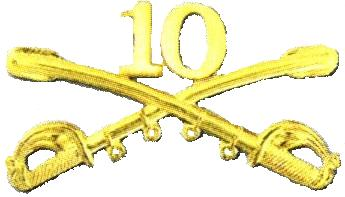
10th Regiment United States Cavalry insignia

On July 1, 1898, the commander of D Troop, 10th Cavalry, Captain Bigelow was in a quandary like many of the officers that waited below the San Juan Heights. His troops had been the first to arrive on line and had been receiving fire from the Heights that was fortified by the Spanish defenders. Other American units went into position on the left and the right. But still no orders to advance came. Bigelow's temporary second in command was First Lieutenant Ord of the 6th Infantry Regiment and then detailed to the staff of General Hawkins as his "aide-de-camp". Ord had volunteered for line duty when too many officers fell ill. Ord chose to be with Bigelow, who was a family friend. Because of his connection, Ord volunteered and went to Brigadier General Hamilton S. Hawkins seeking permission to attack.

—

I sent Jules to General Hawkins to entreatie for an attack. He asked "General, if you will order a charge, I will lead it."

No doubt the old General remembered (the) costly charges against the entrenched enemy during the last war. And maybe hesitated at that memory. Jules then declared, "If you do not wish to order a charge, General, I should like to volunteer." Then after another pause he pleaded, "May I volunteer? We can't stay here, can we?"

"I would not ask any man to volunteer." was the reply. "If you do not forbid it, I will start it," answered Jules.

The General turned toward the Heights as if deciding Jules fate. He stated the brigades were not all on line. General Hawkins told me that he had a terrible feeling as he looked upon Jules, but Jules firmly stated, "I only ask you not to refuse permission." The reply was, "I will not ask for volunteers, I will not give permission and I will not refuse it."

Jules saluted smartly with a broad smile. As Jules left the old General called out, "God bless you and good luck!"...

The General told me that he knew the fight was going to be costly, but that Jules had taken a weight off his shoulders.
—

Captain John Bigelow, Jr., 10th U.S. Cavalry, D Troop in a letter home.

Ord went forward and encouraged other officers to support the regulars when they charged. When he reached D Troop, he was out-of-breath, but with a wide grin. He reported to Bigelow what had happened and that other units on the right were going to support a charge. He asked his friend for permission to give the command. It was granted. Ord then drew his revolver and his sword. Then with eyes upon him he stood and yelled, "Forward!" With a determined step he went up the hill.

The black Buffalo soldiers of the 10th then rose from where they had been hiding from the Spanish fire and began a stride toward the steep heights. Ord advanced through blistering fire and was heard to yell, "Come on—come on, you fellows! Come on—we can't stop now."

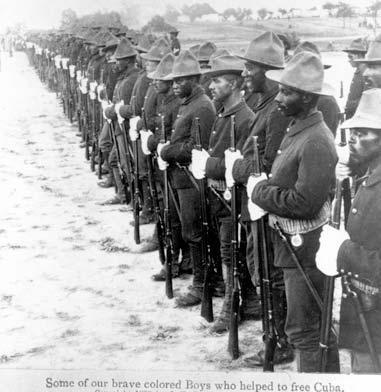
Buffalo Soldiers who participated in the Spanish–American War at San Juan Hill.

About 150 yards from the top the men began a maniacal rush toward the top. Bigelow was hit but continued to urge his men forward. He was then hit in quick succession by three Spanish bullets which caused him to fall. Several soldiers present reported that he encouraged them with, "Men, don't stop for me, just keep up the charge until you get to the top of the hill." His men did so and were able to take the main block house and provided covering fire for those attacking adjacent to them.

Ord was reportedly the first officer to reach the top and began directing supporting fire when he was hit in the throat, mortally wounded. He dropped his pistol and sword and sat down grasping his neck. Corporal Walker of D Troop killed his officer's assailant, then tried to help Ord. Walker stated that Ord had made a statement before he bled to death. The essence was that if the 10th had not been separated by the draw between the two hills, they would have taken the heights already. Ord was then buried on the hill.

Black First Sergeant Givens then took command of D Troop on San Juan Hill and held his position until relieved. Major "Black Jack" Pershing, recent regimental quartermaster, who had charged up Kettle Hill, was given temporary command of D Troop after the fighting ceased. Later Lieutenant A.E. Kennington would command D Troop. On that one day and one place, one half of the 10th's officers and one-fifth of its soldiers became casualties.

== Aftermath ==
Lieutenant Gary Ord did not receive recognition for his actions on San Juan Hill. The Army quietly turned down the requests for a medal for his heroism from his commanding officer and his commanding general. Partly the reason given was that he was listed as a member of the 6th Cavalry on roster reports and was also listed as an aide to his General.

Lieutenant Ord was not the first member of the Ord family to die in Cuba. His father General E.O.C. Ord had died in Havana, Cuba of yellow fever in 1883. Ultimately, both men were laid to final rest at Arlington National Cemetery in section 2 with others of their family.

His brother, then Captain Edward Otho Cresap Ord, II (1858–1923) then of the 22nd Infantry Regiment fought at Santiago July 3–17, 1898. He too would suffer from yellow fever and its second phase. He would live but require a long sabbatical from military service.

Colonel Theodore Roosevelt of the 1st United States Volunteer Cavalry was claimed, mostly by the press, to have started the charge up San Juan Heights, even though he went up only the small hill later called Kettle Hill. "Teddy" was nominated for the redesigned Medal of Honor and when the US Army investigated the claim, they denied the medal. For other reasons, the Medal of Honor was awarded posthumously in 2001 to Roosevelt. There was no mention of Lt. Jules G. Ord or 10th Cavalry Regiment.
