= John Bigelow =

American lawyer and statesman (1817–1911)

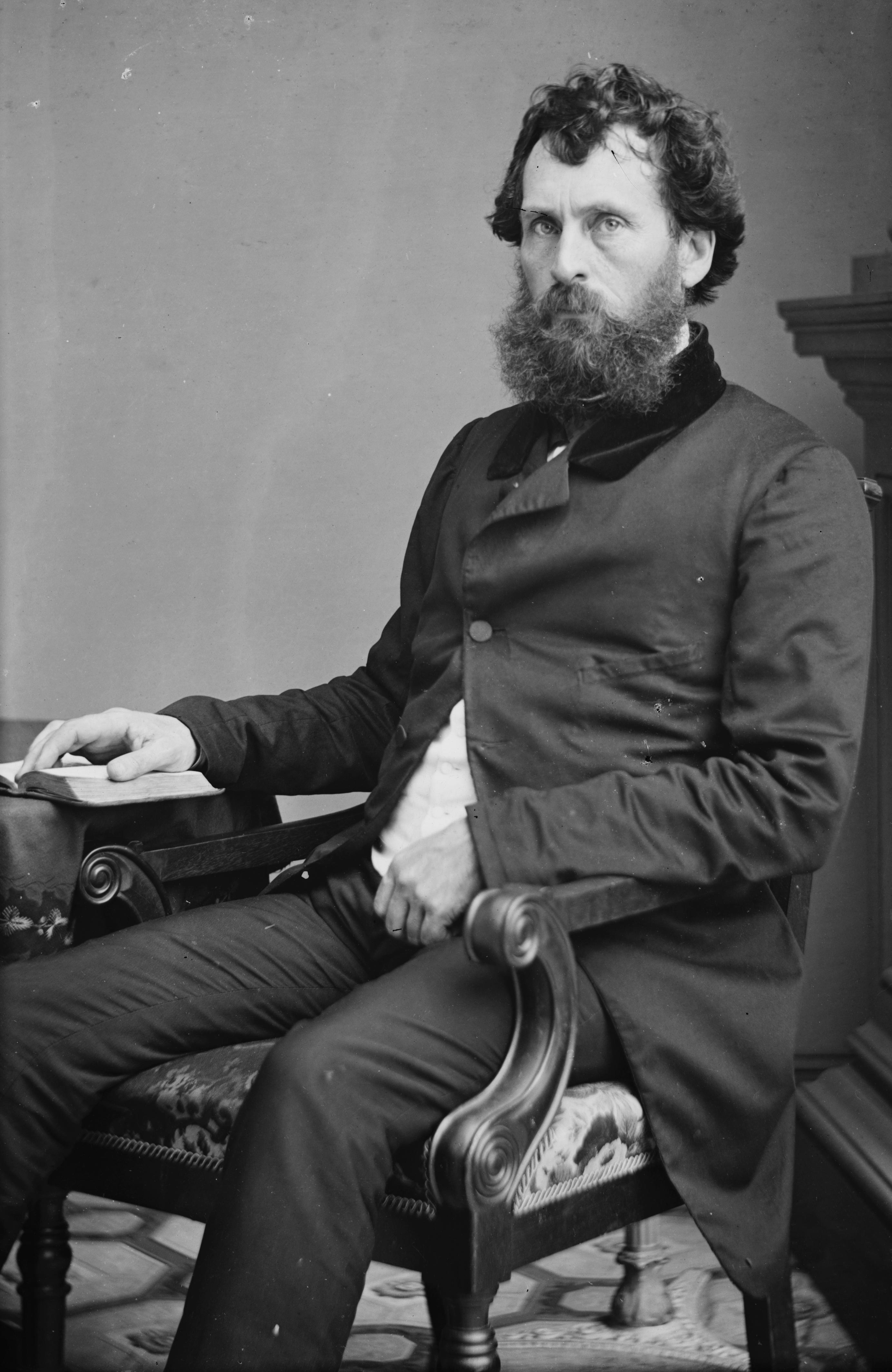
- Bigelow, 1855–1865

21st United States Minister to France
- In office April 23, 1865 – December 23, 1866
- President: Andrew Johnson
- Preceded by: William L. Dayton
- Succeeded by: John Adams Dix

Secretary of State of New York
- In office January 1, 1876 – December 31, 1877
- Governor: Samuel J. Tilden; Lucius Robinson
- Preceded by: Diedrich Willers Jr.
- Succeeded by: Allen C. Beach

Personal details
- Born: November 25, 1817 Malden-on-Hudson, New York, U.S.
- Died: December 19, 1911 (aged 94) New York City
- Party: Democratic
- Children: 9, including John Bigelow Jr. and Poultney Bigelow

John Bigelow Sr. (November 25, 1817 – December 19, 1911) was an American lawyer, newspaper editor, diplomat, and historian who, during the American Civil War, "[a]s consul to Paris, then as minister to France, ... did more than any other man to ward off dreaded French intervention on behalf of the Confederacy...." He played a central role in the founding of the New York Public Library in 1895, becoming at age 93 the first President of the Board of Trustees of the New York Public Library. He also served as the first president of the New York Law School Board of Trustees. He edited the complete works of Benjamin Franklin and the first autobiography of Franklin taken from Franklin's previously lost original manuscript.

== Early life ==
Born in Malden-on-Hudson, New York, he graduated in 1835 from Union College, where he was a member of the Sigma Phi Society and the Philomathean Society and was admitted to the bar in 1838. In 1848, William Cullen Bryant took on Bigelow as a partner and co-owner of the New-York Evening Post, after Bigelow was able to borrow money from Charles O'Conor to buy his share. He remained in that position until 1861, when President Abraham Lincoln appointed him American consul in Paris.

== Political and literary career ==
Bigelow began his political career as a reform Democrat, working with William Cullen Bryant in New York. In 1848, his antislavery convictions led him to leave the party, and he joined the Free Soil Party. In 1856, he led other former Democrats into the newly formed Republican Party and wrote a campaign biography of John C. Frémont, who won the Republican presidential nomination that year. In 1861, President Abraham Lincoln appointed him American consul in Paris, and Bigelow progressed to Chargé d'Affaires and Envoy Extraordinary and Minister Plenipotentiary to the Court of Napoleon III. In this capacity, working together with Charles Francis Adams, the United States minister to the United Kingdom, Bigelow helped to block the attempts to have France and the United Kingdom intervene in the American Civil War in favor of the Confederacy and thereby played a material role in the Union victory. Bigelow's service in France also brought about "the wreckage of Confederate plans to build a fleet" there. Bigelow also negotiated with Emperor Napoleon III over withdrawing France's troops from Mexico, which were supporting Emperor Maximilian I of Mexico. Historian Don H. Doyle writes, "Bigelow was one of Seward's most brilliant appointees, and he soon became a pioneering master of the arts of public diplomacy in Europe". On March 15, 1865, Lincoln appointed Bigelow minister to France, the previous minister, William L. Dayton, having died. After leaving this position, he went to Germany, where he lived for three years, through the period of the Franco-Prussian War, and he became a friend of Otto von Bismarck.

After the war's conclusion, he returned to New York, where he assisted his old friend Samuel J. Tilden in opposing the corruption that flourished in New York City under William Magear Tweed. Because of the universal respect in which Bigelow was held in New York, he was offered nominations by both political parties for state office in 1872. Under the influence of Tilden, Bigelow decided to rejoin the Democratic party, accepted its nomination, and was elected Secretary of State of New York, a position he held until 1876. When the Democrats nominated Tilden for President in 1876, he served as Tilden's campaign manager, and in that capacity advised Tilden in the famous dispute over the result of the presidential election. Tilden died almost a decade after the dispute was decided in favor of his rival, Rutherford B. Hayes, and Bigelow then acted as one of Tilden's estate trust executors. He carried out Tilden's wishes, over several years, to develop, design, and establish the New York Public Library and served as its first president from May 27, 1895, until his death on December 19, 1911.

He was a staunch proponent of the development of the Panama Canal. He was a friend of Philippe Bunau-Varilla, who brought Panama's declaration of Independence to Bigelow's home. Panama's first proposed flag, made there by Mrs. Bunau Varilla, was rejected by the Panamanians, who made their own.

Bigelow's writing career, which advanced with Bryant on the New-York Evening Post, included several books. He was one of the first Americans to visit Haiti with an open mind, and he published The Wisdom of the Haitians, which, before the Civil War, was one of the few American works to take a positive view of Haitian independence.

Bigelow published an edition of The Autobiography of Benjamin Franklin in 1868, the first publication taken from Franklin's "long-lost manuscript". After haggling over the price, he agreed to pay the original asking price of 25,000 francs and purchased the manuscript from its owner. Since the manuscript ended at age 51, in 1757, Bigelow "appended to it carefully selected passages from Franklin's writings to complete the story of his life, and in 1874 issued in three volumes The Life of Benjamin Franklin, Written by Himself. In 1895 Bigelow published the two-volume The Life of Samuel J. Tilden.

== Personal life ==
On June 11, 1850, Bigelow married Jane Tunis Poultney and they had nine children. They included:

- John Bigelow Jr. (May 12, 1854 – February 29, 1936) graduated from the United States Military Academy at West Point, New York in 1877. He served in the United States Army in Texas with the Buffalo Soldiers, taught at West Point, served again in the West, and fought and was seriously wounded in Cuba. He retired in October 1904. From 1905 to 1910, he was a professor at M.I.T. During World War I, he was recalled to active duty and served in Washington. He traveled and wrote until his death in 1936.
- Poultney Bigelow (1855-1954) was a lawyer and a noted journalist and editor.
- Flora Bigelow, who first married Charles S. Dodge, with whom she had a daughter, Lucie Bigelow Rosen, and a son, John Bigelow Dodge. Flora and Charles divorced, and Flora married The Hon. Lionel Guest (1880–1935), son of Ivor Bertie Guest, 1st Baron Wimborne (1835–1914) and Cornelia Guest, Baroness Wimborne (1847–1927). He was a first cousin of Winston Churchill.

In 1853, the Bigelows' eldest child died, following the deaths of Bigelow's younger sister and parents within the year preceding. These losses may explain how he could have turned "from agnosticism and occasional attendance at a Unitarian church to devout belief in the Man-God Jesus Christ and in Swedenborg as expounder of His Word". Bigelow wrote about the experience in The Bible That Was Lost and is Found.

=== Legacy ===
On August 8, 2001, New York City Mayor Rudolph Giuliani signed a bill adding the name "John Bigelow Plaza" to the intersection of 41st Street and Fifth Avenue, Manhattan, directly in front of the New York Public Library Main Branch. His estate at Highland Falls, New York, known as The Squirrels, was listed on the National Register of Historic Places in 1982.

== See also ==
- The Papers of Benjamin Franklin
- Bibliography of Benjamin Franklin

== Sources ==
- Bigelow, John, The Life of Samuel J. Tilden (2 vols., 1895; edited and revised by Nikki Oldaker 2009). ISBN 978-0-9786698-1-2 Samuel Tilden.net
- Mr. Lincoln and Friends: John Bigelow
- Retrospections of an Active Life. 3 volumes. New York: Baker & Taylor Co., 1909.
- Bigelow Genealogy at fp.enter.net
- Bigelow and Union College, in NYT on May 18, 1913
- Clapp, Margaret A. (1947). Forgotten First Citizen: John Bigelow. Winner of the 1948 Pulitzer Prize for Biography.
- John Bigelow Papers, The New York Public Library.
- The Correspondence of John Bigelow, Union College
- Chisholm, Hugh, ed. (1911). "Bigelow, John" . Encyclopædia Britannica. Vol. 3 (11th ed.). Cambridge University Press.

Diplomatic posts
Preceded by William L. Dayton	United States Ambassador to France; 1864–1866	Succeeded by John A. Dix
Political offices
Preceded by Diedrich Willers Jr.	Secretary of State of New York; 1876 - 1877	Succeeded by Allen C. Beach
