= Poultney Bigelow =

American journalist and author (1855–1954)

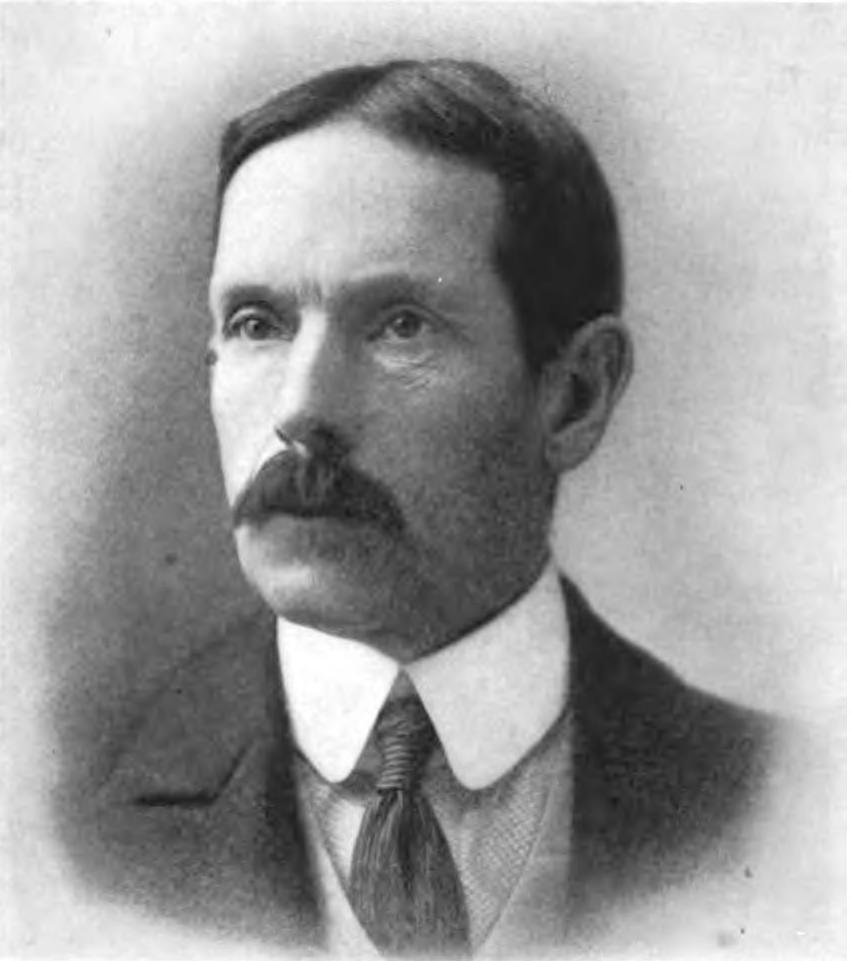
- Born: September 10, 1855
- Died: May 28, 1954
- Occupations: Writer, jurist
- Spouse: Edith Jaffray

Poultney Bigelow (September 10, 1855 – May 28, 1954) was an American journalist and author.

He was born in New York City, the fourth of eight children of John Bigelow, lawyer, statesman, and co-owner of the New York Evening Post, together with his wife Jane Tunis Poultney.

In 1861, at the beginning of the Civil War, when Bigelow was six years old, his father was appointed United States consul in Paris, and subsequently (1865) Minister to France, and Poultney was sent to a Potsdam preparatory school. While there he became a friend of Prince Wilhelm and his younger brother, Prince Henry, playing "Cowboys and Indians" with them in the schoolyard. His friendship and correspondence with the Kaiser continued throughout their lives, though their relations became somewhat more reserved just before World War I as a result of some of the opinions expressed in Bigelow's articles. For a time, Bigelow was an admirer of both Adolf Hitler and Benito Mussolini — an admiration which ended when they demonstrated their violent natures.

Bigelow entered Yale College in 1873. For reasons of health, he took a two-year leave from studies, sailing for the Orient, which left him shipwrecked off the coast of Japan. He returned to Yale and graduated in 1879. He obtained a law degree from Columbia Law School and practiced briefly.

His chief occupation from the 1880s till his retirement in 1906 was as an author and journalist. He traveled extensively, and wrote often on the subject. He was a London correspondent for several American publications and was correspondent for The Times (of London) in Cuba during the Spanish–American War. He was a voluminous correspondent with the leading figures of the day, including Roger Casement, Henry George, Mark Twain, Geraldine Farrar, Percy Grainger, Frederic Remington, Kaiser Wilhelm II, Israel Zangwill and George S. Viereck.

He was the author of eleven books, including a two-volume autobiography, and several on history and colonial administration.

He founded the first American magazine devoted to amateur sports, Outing, in 1885.

Bigelow married twice. His first wife, with whom he had three daughters, was Edith Evelyn Joffrey (Jaffray)[1889 NY Social Register]. They married April 16, 1884, and divorced in 1902. His second wife, Lillian Pritchard, was a librarian in the library founded by John Bigelow at Malden. She died on December 1, 1932.

He retired to his family's home at Malden-on-Hudson.

In 1930, at the age of 74, he noted that "it's hell to live so long", but still made annual trips to visit the former Kaiser at Doorn.

He entered the Dale Sanitarium on January 14, 1954, where he died at the age of 98, at which time he was Yale's oldest alumnus, and the oldest member of the Athenaeum of London.

== Panama Canal controversy ==
In January 1906, Poultney Bigelow published an article in The Independent (New York) describing neglect and mismanagement in the isthmus of Panama related to the building of the Panama Canal. There was a heated and immediate response from then Secretary of War William Howard Taft, as well as a significant back and forth in the press. Bigelow was subpoenaed to appear before the Senate Committee on Interoceanic Canals on January 18, 1906.

In Nov 1906 Theodore Roosevelt visited Panama, where he was to make an investigation of labor conditions in particular. Asked about Bigelow's criticisms, Roosevelt was dismissive, stating, "in every large work there was always someone to find something that was not done as it should have been; but the employees should on no account pay attention to such criticisms, as the critics would sink out of sight, while the work (...) would remain long after all criticism had been forgotten.”

Although dismissed by Taft and Roosevelt, several historians have suggested that Bigelow's article was instrumental in Roosevelt visiting the canal, the first time a US president had traveled outside the US during the presidency, and to ultimately improve working conditions at the canal project.

== Works ==
- 1889 – The German Emperor
- 1892 – The German Emperor and His Eastern Neighbors
- 1892 – Paddles and Politics Down the Danube
- 1895 – The German Struggle for Liberty
- 1895 – The Borderland of Czar and Kaiser: Notes from Both Sides of the Russian Frontier
- 1896 – History of the German Struggle for Liberty
- 1897 – Au pays des Boers
- 1898 – White Man's Africa
- 1900 – China Against the World
- 1901 – The Children of the Nations: A Study of Colonization and Its Problems
- 1915 – An American's Opinion of British Colonial Policy
- 1915 – Prussian Memories, 1864–1914
- 1918 – Britain, Mother of Colonies
- 1918 – Genseric, King of the Vandals and the First Prussian Kaiser
- 1919 – Prussianism and Pacifism: The Two Wilhelms Between the Revolutions of 1848 and 1918
- 1923 – Japan and Her Colonies, Being Extracts from a Diary Made Whilst Visiting Formosa, Manchuria, and Shantun in the Year 1921
- 1925 – Seventy Summers

== Sources ==
- Poultney Bigelow. "The Russian and His Jew." Harper's, vol. 57, #526, April 1894, pp. 603–14.
- Poultney Bigelow. "The German Struggle for Liberty." Harper's, Oct 1895
