= Hamilton S. Hawkins =

United States Army general (1834–1910)

Hamilton Smith Hawkins
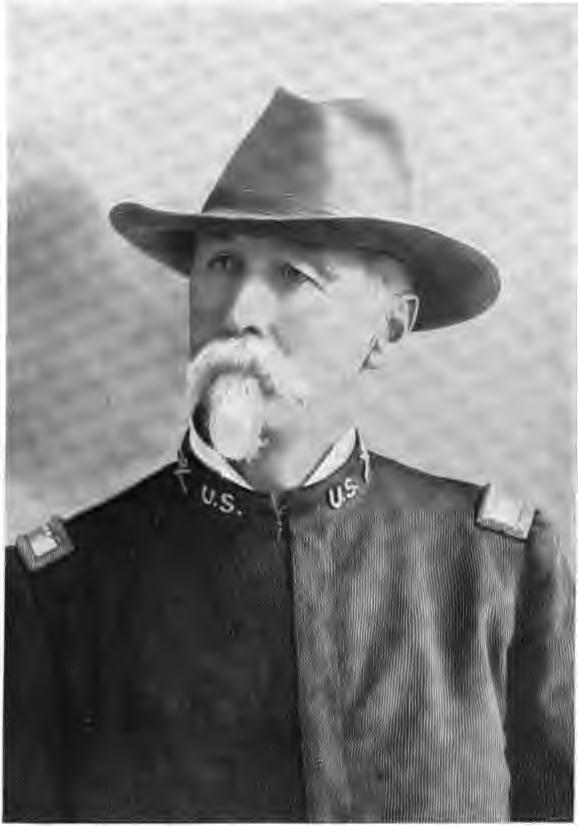
- Born: November 13, 1834; Fort Moultrie, South Carolina
- Died: March 27, 1910 (aged 75); Watkins Glen, New York
- Burial place: West Point Cemetery
- Military career
- Allegiance: United States of America
- Branch: United States Army
- Service years: 1861–1898
- Rank: Major General
- Conflicts: American Civil War; Spanish–American War

Hamilton Smith Hawkins (November 13, 1834 – March 27, 1910) was a United States Army Major General during the Spanish–American War.

== Biography ==
Hawkins was born in Fort Moultrie, South Carolina on November 13, 1834. He attended the United States Military Academy between 1852 and 1855, but did not graduate with the class of 1856 due to deficient academics. Despite being a South Carolinian, Hawkins served in the Union Army during the American Civil War. He fought at several battles, including the Battle of Gettysburg. He remained in the army after the Civil War and participated in campaigns against the Plains Indians. He became Commandant of Cadets at West Point, the only one to have attended the academy and failed to graduate. He served in this position between 1888 and 1892. Hawkins was Commandant of the United States Infantry and Cavalry School, at Fort Leavenworth, Kansas between October 1894 and April 1898.

On May 4, 1898, Hawkins was appointed brigadier general in the volunteer army and was in command of the 1st Brigade, 1st Division, VII Corps stationed in Tampa, Florida when the Spanish–American War began. He was transferred to command the 1st Brigade, 1st Division, V Corps and sailed to Cuba. His brigade landed at Daiquirí, was lightly engaged in the fighting at the Battle of Las Guasimas and spearheaded the assault at the Battle of San Juan Hill.

While the main U.S. attack was pinned down under Spanish artillery on San Juan Hill, Hawkins permitted Lieutenant Jules Garesche Ord to begin an attack on the hill and then rushed to the front of the main body of his brigade yelling "Come on! Come on!" and led his troops up the hill where he was severely wounded in the foot near the crest. On July 8, 1898, Hawkins was appointed major general of volunteers and returned to the United States. He retired on October 4, 1898.

Hawkins died at the Glen Springs Sanitarium in Watkins Glen, New York on March 27, 1910, aged 75.

Battery Hawkins built in 1914 to protect Pearl Harbor was named for him.

== Personal ==
Hawkins was the son of Hamilton Smith Hawkins, an Army surgeon from Maryland who was killed during the Mexican–American War.

His son, Hamilton S. Hawkins III, was an 1894 West Point graduate who commanded the 1st Cavalry Division from 1934 to 1936. His grandson, Hamilton Smith Hawkins IV, was a member of the Military Academy Class of 1926 who received his diploma posthumously after dying in a polo match one month before graduation. His son-in-law Robert Lee Howze and two other grandsons were also West Point graduates.

Hawkins and his wife, Annie Gray Hawkins, were buried in Section I of the West Point Cemetery. His son, daughter-in-law and grandson were buried in Section V. His daughter, son-in-law and grandson, Hamilton Hawkins Howze, were also buried in Section I.

Military offices
Preceded by Edwin F. Townsend	Commandant of the Command and General Staff College; October 1894 – April 1898 (closed during Spanish–American War)	Succeeded by Charles W. Miner
