= James Garesche Ord =

United States Army general

J. Garesche Ord
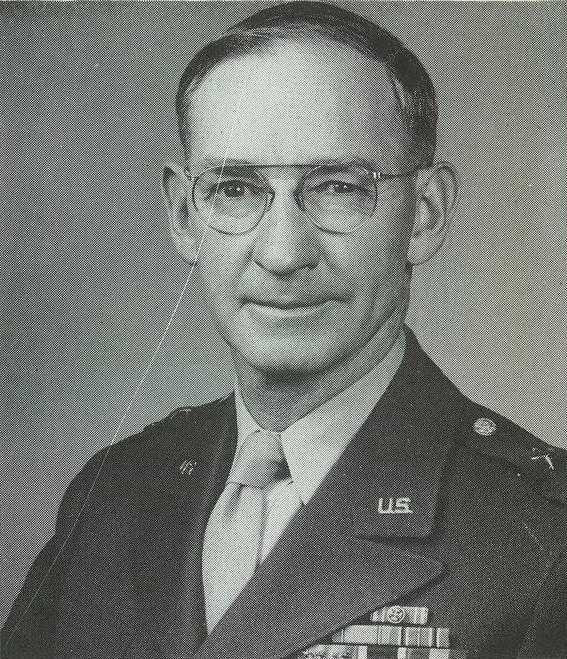
- Major General J. Garesche Ord, Chairman of the Joint Brazil–U.S. Defense Commission in World War II
- Born: October 18, 1886; Fort Lewis, Durango, Colorado, US
- Died: April 17, 1960 (aged 73); Washington, D.C., US
- Burial place: Arlington National Cemetery
- Relatives: Edward Otho Cresap Ord II (Father); Jules Garesche "Garry" Ord (Uncle); James Thompson Ord (Uncle); James Basevi Ord (Cousin); Edward Otho Cresap Ord (Grandfather)
- Military career
- Allegiance: United States
- Branch: United States Army
- Service years: 1909–1946
- Rank: Major general
- Nicknames: "Sunny" "Garry"
- Service number: 0-2608
- Unit: Infantry Branch
- Commands: 12th Infantry Regiment; 57th Infantry Regiment; 28th Infantry Division; Joint Brazil-US. Defense Commission
- Conflicts: Pancho Villa Expedition; World War I World War II
- Awards: Legion of Merit; Order of Abdon Calderón, First Class (Ecuador); Order of Military Merit (Brazil) (Grand Officer)

Major General James Garesche Ord (October 18, 1886 – April 17, 1960) was a United States Army officer who briefly commanded the 28th Infantry Division and was Chairman of the Joint Brazil–U.S. Defense Commission during World War II.

== Early life ==
J. Garesche Ord, nicknamed "Sunny" and "Garry," was born at Fort Lewis near Durango, Colorado, on April 18, 1886. He was the son of Major Edward Otho Cresap Ord II (1858–1923) and Mary Frances (Norton) Ord.

His grandfather was Major General Edward Otho Cresap Ord (1818–1883), and his great-grandfather was First Lieutenant James Ord (1789–1872).

His uncle, Jules Garesche "Garry" Ord (1866–1898) was also an Army officer, and has been credited by historians with sparking the charge up San Juan Hill during the Spanish–American War, at which Jules Ord was killed.

Another uncle, James Thompson Ord (1863–1905), was a captain in the Army, and his son, Lieutenant Colonel James Basevi Ord (1892–1938) was the cousin of James Garesche Ord.

== Start of military career ==
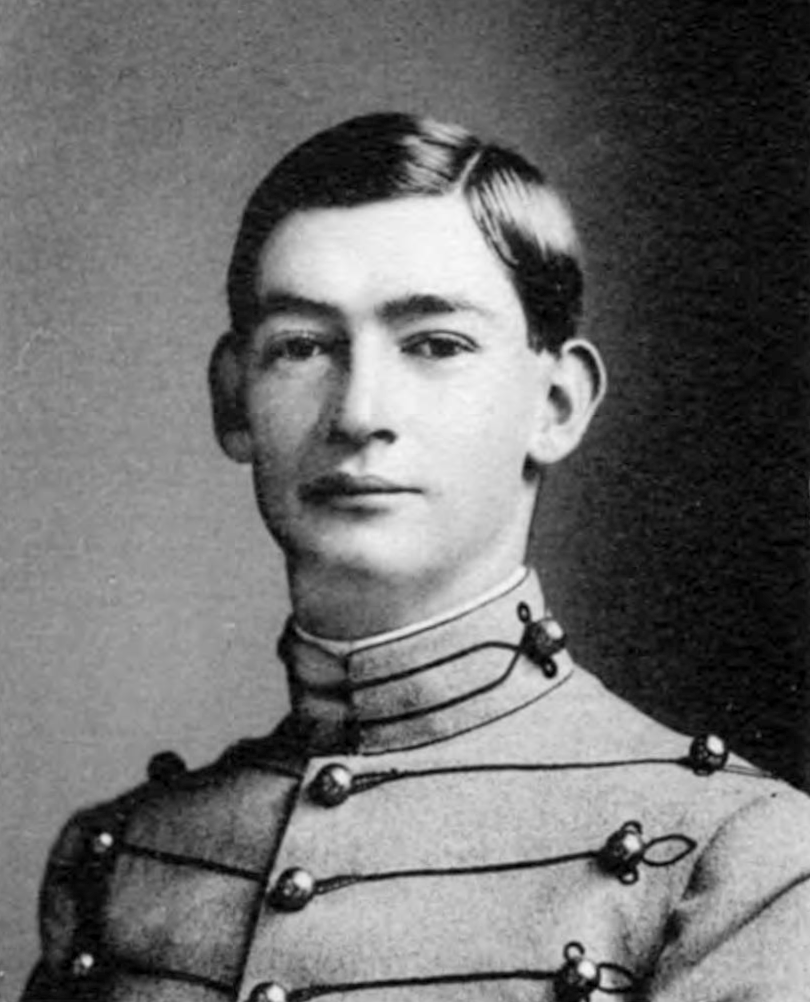
Ord at West Point in 1909

James Garesche Ord graduated from the United States Military Academy (USMA) at West Point, New York, in 1909 and received his commission as a second lieutenant of Infantry. His classmates included George S. Patton, Robert L. Eichelberger, William Hood Simpson, Jacob L. Devers, John C. H. Lee, Horace H. Fuller, Edwin F. Harding and Edwin "Pa" Watson.

Initially assigned to the 30th Infantry Regiment, his early postings included Fort Davis and Fort Gibbon in Alaska, the Presidio of San Francisco, and Plattsburg Barracks in New York.

Ord served at Eagle Pass and San Antonio, Texas during the Pancho Villa Expedition, and was then assigned as Professor of Military Science at Culver Military Academy.

== World War I ==
In 1917 Ord was assigned as aide-de-camp to Hunter Liggett. He served on the staff of the American Expeditionary Forces Headquarters and the 41st Division, and was assigned as provost marshal for I Corps before serving again as Liggett's Aide at the end of the war and during the post-war occupation of Germany.

== Post-war ==
After the war Ord's assignments included Assistant Plans, Operations and Training Officer (G3) for Third Army. He graduated from the Command and General Staff College in 1924 and remained as an instructor. He graduated from the Army War College in 1929.

From 1930 to 1934 Ord served on the Supply and Logistics staff (G4) at the War Department, and he commanded the 12th Infantry Regiment from 1934 to 1936. Ord was Director of the Infantry Board at Fort Benning from 1936 to 1938. (The Infantry Board was one of several panels the Army used to consider modernization of training, tactics, weapons and vehicles in the years before World War II.) From 1938 to 1940 Ord commanded the 57th Infantry Regiment in the Philippines.

== World War II ==
In 1940 Ord was assigned as a Regular Army observer and advisor for the Pennsylvania National Guard, responsible for taking steps to improve individual and collective readiness for the 28th Infantry Division during the train-up in advance of World War II.

From 1940 to 1942 he was Deputy Commander of the 1st Infantry Division, receiving promotion to brigadier general. From February to June, 1942 Ord commanded the 28th Infantry Division, capitalizing on the relationships he had developed while advising the Pennsylvania National Guard in 1940. Ord commanded the division until being succeeded by Omar Bradley.

Ord served as a member and later Chairman of the Joint Brazil-US. Defense Commission from 1943 to 1945. The commission worked to strengthen military ties between the two countries during the war, reducing the likelihood of Axis powers attacks on US shipping as soldiers traveled across the Atlantic to Africa and Europe, and minimizing the influence of the Axis in South America.

== Awards ==
Ord's Army awards and decorations included the Legion of Merit. His foreign awards included Ecuador's Order of Abdon Calderón, First Class, and Brazil's Order of Military Merit (Grand Officer) and War Medal.

== Retirement, death and burial ==
Ord retired in 1946 and resided in Washington, D.C., until his death from a heart attack at Walter Reed Army Medical Center on April 17, 1960. He was buried at Arlington National Cemetery, Section 2, Site 979 LH.

== Family ==
In April 1927 Ord married Irene Helen Walsh of Memphis, Tennessee (1900–1993). They were the parents of three children: U.S. Air Force Captain James G. Ord, Jr. (1928–1994); Marian E. Ord (born 1930); and Edward O. C. Ord (born 1936).

Irene Walsh Ord was a graduate of West Tennessee College and the University of Tennessee Law School, and practiced law before her marriage to Ord. In 1979 she married Brigadier General (Retired) Philip S. Gage (1885–1982), one of Ord's West Point classmates.

Military offices
Preceded by Edward Martin	Commanding General 28th Infantry Division; February−June 1942	Succeeded by Omar Bradley
