= Edward Otho Cresap Ord II =

American military officer, linguist and inventor (1858–1923)

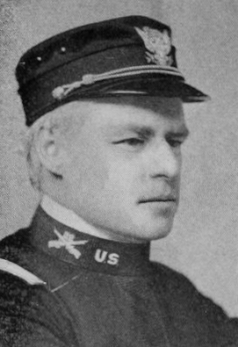
- Born: November 9, 1858; Benicia Barracks, San Francisco, Solano, now Benicia, California, US
- Died: April 4, 1923 (aged 64); Eagle Rock, Los Angeles, California, US
- Burial place: San Francisco National Cemetery, San Francisco, California
- Relatives: Edward Ord, father Jules Garesche Ord, brother
- Military career
- Allegiance: United States
- Branch: United States Army
- Service years: 1879–1903; 1917–1918
- Rank: Major
- Conflicts: Indian Wars; Spanish–American War; Philippine–American War
- Other work: Inventor, painter, poet and linguist

Edward Otho Cresap Ord II (November 9, 1858 – April 4, 1923) was an American military officer, artist, writer, and inventor. He was a United States Army Major who served with the 22nd Infantry Regiment during the Indian Wars, the Spanish–American War and the Philippine–American War. He helped direct relief work after the 1906 San Francisco earthquake. He was a military instructor, an expert linguist and spent time in painting and writing poetry. He was also an inventor who patented a new type of gold pan and different types of rifle and handgun sights.

== Early life ==
Ord was the eldest male of 15 children (13 lived past childhood) and was born at Benicia Barracks, California, on November 9, 1858. His father, Edward Otho Cresap Ord, married Mary Mercer Thompson on October 14, 1854. The senior Ord was a career military officer who was a hero in the American Civil War and had served as a major general of Volunteers. After the war, he reverted to brigadier general in the Regular Army.

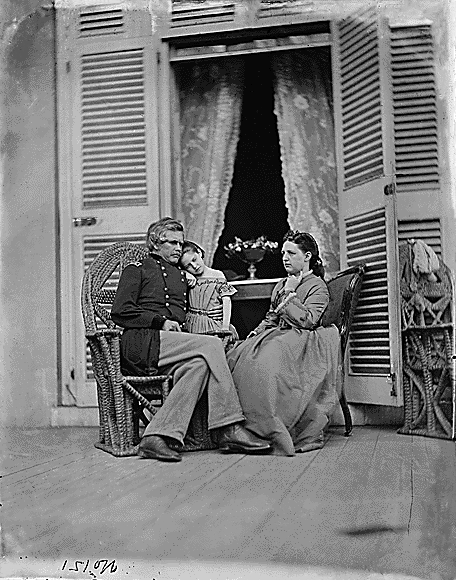
General Edward Ord, his wife Mary and one of their daughters

On August 2, 1870, the family was in San Francisco, California with seven children. Edward, the eldest son, lived with servants and was taught by tutors and in public schools. His life in the west was one of which his father was a senior military officer, a decorated Civil War hero and he was "his father's son." His life was privileged compared to others. As he grew up he watched both military officers and men show respect and courtesy to his parents. Later young Edward attended the public school in Omaha, Nebraska. He was appointed to the U.S. Naval Academy in 1876, but withdrew after his second year.

In 1879 he was appointed second lieutenant in the 22nd Infantry Regiment, U.S. Army.

By June 1880 Ord's parents were in San Antonio, Bexar County, Texas. His father was the Commanding General of the Department of Texas. Ord's father retired from the Army on December 6, 1880 after serving 41 years. General Ord began a second career building the Mexican Southern Railroad from Texas to Mexico City. His family stayed in San Antonio.

In 1880, young Edward was stationed at Fort McKavett, Menard, Texas. He married Mary Frances Norton on November 10, 1879 in Bexar County. She was the daughter of Charles Gilman and Frances (Brown) Norton.

They had the following children:

- Edward Ord, born September 1880 in Bexar County, Texas.
- Harry Ord, born October 1881 in Bexar County, Texas.
- James Garesche "Garry" Ord, born October 1886 in Colorado.
- Ellen F. "Nellie" Ord, born October 1889 in Benicia Barracks, Solano, California.
- Mary N. Ord, born October 1895 in Arkansas.

In July 1883, his father died in Havana, Cuba, of yellow fever while en route from Vera Cruz, Mexico to New York City. Young Edward was given leave for his father’s funeral at Arlington National Cemetery which was attended by many politicians and Army personnel.

His brother, Jules Garesche "Gary", was a United States Army First Lieutenant who was killed in action after leading the charge of Buffalo Soldiers of the 10th U.S. Cavalry up San Juan Hill. History now records that "Gary" Ord was responsible for the "spontaneous" charge that took the San Juan Heights during the Spanish–American War in Cuba on July 1, 1898.

== First military career ==
=== Indian Wars ===
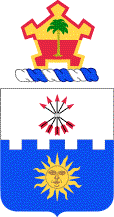
The 22nd Infantry Regiment coat of arms

Second Lieutenant Ord of the 22nd Infantry served in the Indian campaigns in Texas in 1880, and later commanded the Seminole Indian scouts in 1882 to about 1890. Since 1870, the U.S. Army invited Black Seminoles to return from Mexico to serve as army scouts for the United States. The Seminole Negro Indian Scouts (originally a black unit despite the name) played a lead role in the Texas Indian Wars of the 1870s. The scouts became famous for their tracking abilities and feats of endurance. Four men were awarded the Medal of Honor. They served as advance scouts for the commanding white officers and the all-black units known as the Buffalo Soldiers, with whom they were closely associated. After the close of the Texas Indian Wars, the scouts remained stationed at Fort Clark in Brackettville, Texas.

First Lieutenant Ord participated in the feared revolt of the Ghost Dancers supposedly led by Sitting Bull in mid-December 1891 and took part in patrols in Montana trying to keep the peace through the end of 1892. This was during the time when Sitting Bull was killed.

=== Spanish–American War ===
Lieutenant Ord fought at Santiago in Cuba during the Spanish–American War with the 22nd Infantry Regiment from July 3 to July 17, 1898. There he was promoted to captain. After the war, Captain Ord remained in Cuba for nine months as interpreter on the staff of General Henry Lawton. There he suffered from a mild case of yellow fever.

=== Philippine–American War ===
In late 1900 or early 1901, Captain Ord was sent to the Philippines from Benicia Barracks when the Philippine–American War broke out. He participated in battle at San Isidro then other battles during the Moro Rebellion on Mindanao and Jolo.

Ord, like his father would continue to suffer from yellow fever and its second phase. Unlike his father, he would live but require a long sabbatical from military service. He was forced to retire on October 10, 1903 due to the physical disabilities of yellow fever contracted in Cuba.

== Post military ==
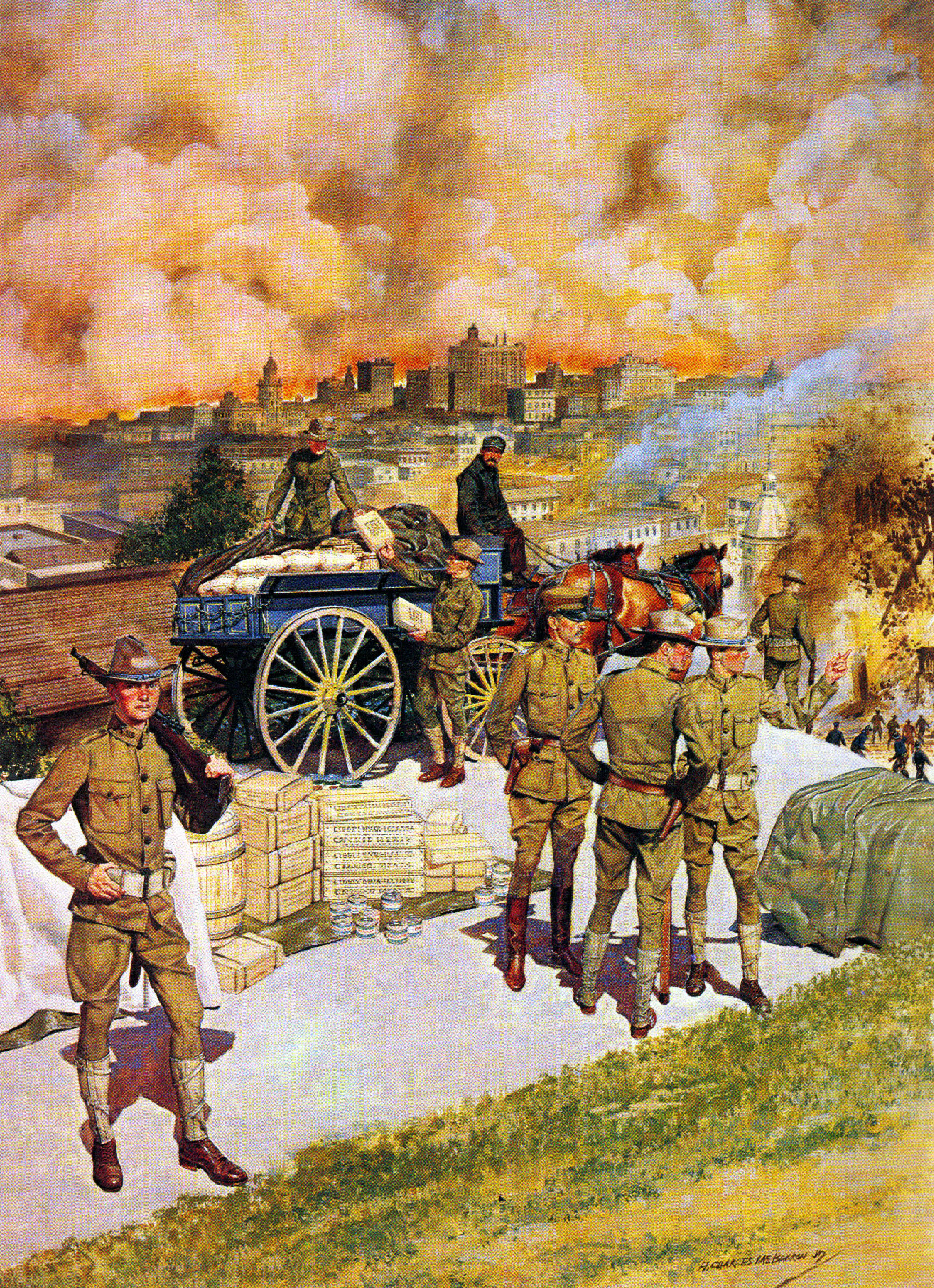
Thank God For the Soldiers, depicting US Army soldiers bringing in critical supplies for the survivors

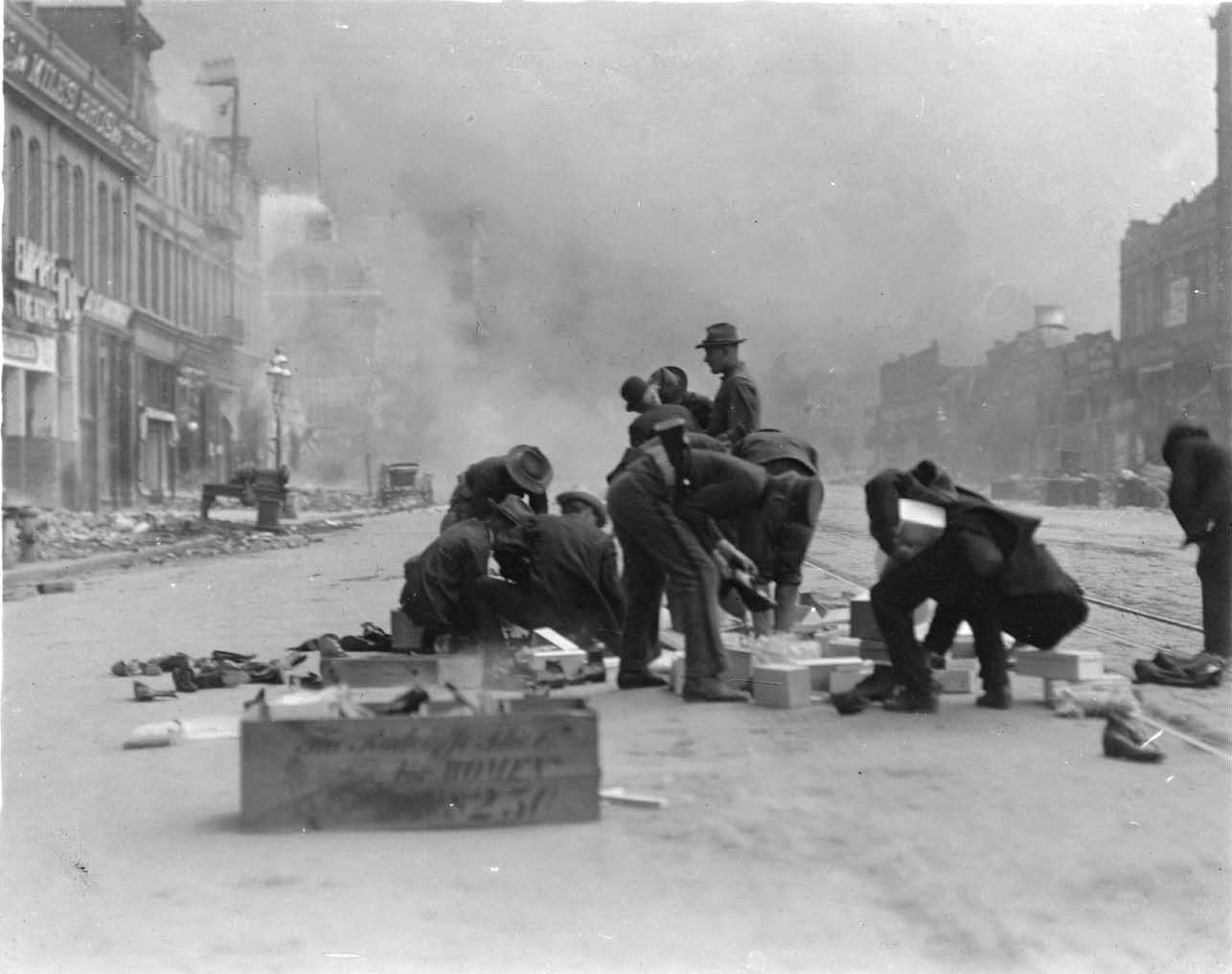
Soldiers reported looting during the aftermath of the fire

On April 18, 1906, just after the San Francisco earthquake Ord was appointed a Special Police Officer by Mayor Eugene Schmitz and liaisoned with Major General Adolphus Greely for relief work. He wrote a long letter to his mother on the 20th regarding Schmitz' "Shoot-to-Kill" Order and some "despicable" behavior of certain soldiers of his former 22nd Regiment from the Presidio who were looting.

In 1908, he was the military instructor at St. Matthew's school in San Mateo, California, and later at the University of Alabama. During this time period he continued his correspondence with Mexican general and politician Jerónimo Treviño, mostly about the health of Trevino's son Jerónimo Treviño y Ord, his nephew, but also discussing aspects of the Mexican Revolution until his friend's death in 1914.

== Second military career ==
In 1915, Ord was a military aide on the staff of the governor of Arizona. He was also a liaison with Army unit that included his former regiment. He saw service on the Mexican border due to the rise of tension along the border following the Battle of Agua Prieta. This was where Pancho Villa sustained his greatest defeat and his units were disorganized and wandered around northern Mexico foraging for supplies. Desperate for food and fresh horses, Pancho Villa camped his army of an estimated 500 horsemen outside of Columbus, New Mexico on the Mexican side of the border in March 1916. On March 9, 1916, he invaded the United States for supplies and arms which resulted in the Battle of Columbus. Ord had been given the rank of Major and served Arizona well in organizing and arming militia units. No major raids across the border took place in Arizona.

As the result of his Arizona service, on June 3, 1916, Ord was advanced to the grade of major on the Army retired list. In early 1917, he returned to full active duty, serving at Big Bend, Texas; Fort Sill, Oklahoma; and Tuscaloosa, Alabama.

In December 1918, because of complications of his yellow fever sustained in Cuba, he retired from the Army due to ill health.

== Later life ==
In 1920, Ord was residing in Oakland, Alameda County, California. Ord was listed as an expert linguist and possessed exceptional artistic ability, devoting much of his leisure time to producing landscape & seascape paintings. and to writing poetry.

Ord was also an inventor who patented a new type of gold pan and different weapon sights. He was a co-owner of several mines in Arizona, California, Mexico and Utah. Papers pertaining to the inventions of E.O.C. Ord II are in the special collections section of the Bancroft Library at the University of California, Berkeley. These include Ord's patents, original drawings and diagrams, advertising material and instructions on use of the "Gold-Pan-Batea", an improved Gold Pan which recycled water. This led to the formation of the California Gold Pan Company and later of the Household Utilities Manufacturing Company. Papers include correspondence and business papers of mine holdings and interests in and around California, Arizona, Utah and Mexico. There are also three diaries; 1) One by William Ord in 1869 of surveying and prospecting in California and Nevada. 2) Two by E.O.C. Ord II, from a prospecting trip to Inyo County, California in 1908–1909 and in 1910 to Zero Mine in Arizona. This collection also includes a sketch of Bradshaw Fissure drawn by Ord.

Ord was a Roman Catholic by religion. He died at Eagle Rock, Los Angeles, California on April 4, 1923.

== See also ==
- Jules Garesche Ord
- Edward Ord
