= E. O. C. Ord =

United States Army general (1818–1883)

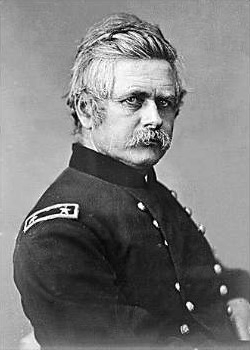
- Born: Edward Otho Cresap Ord; October 18, 1818; Cumberland, Maryland, US
- Died: July 22, 1883 (aged 64); Havana, Captaincy General of Cuba
- Burial place: Arlington National Cemetery
- Relatives: Edward Otho Cresap Ord, II, son Jules Garesche Ord, son
- Military career
- Allegiance: United States (Union)
- Branch: United States Army (Union Army)
- Service years: 1839–1881
- Rank: Major General
- Commands: XIII Corps; XVIII Corps; XXIV Corps; Army of the James
- Conflicts: Seminole War; American Civil War; American Indian Wars

Edward Otho Cresap Ord (October 18, 1818 – July 22, 1883) was a United States Army officer who saw action in the Seminole War, the Indian Wars, and the American Civil War. He commanded an army during the final days of the Civil War, and was instrumental in forcing the surrender of Confederate General Robert E. Lee. He also designed Fort Sam Houston. He died in Havana, Cuba of yellow fever.

== Early life and career ==
Ord was born in Cumberland, Maryland, the son of James and Rebecca Ord. Family tradition made James Ord the illegitimate son of George IV of the United Kingdom and Maria Fitzherbert but, instead, he may have been the son of Ralph Ord, who was baptised at Wapping, Middlesex, in 1757, the son of John Ord, a factor (agent) from Berwick-upon-Tweed. Historian James Munson has concluded that Mrs Fitzherbert had no child by the Prince of Wales, although other historians disagree. For example, Saul David concludes that it is generally accepted that the Prince of Wales and Mrs Fitzherbert had at least one child and that James Ord would be the most likely candidate.

Edward Ord was considered a mathematical genius and was appointed to the United States Military Academy by President Andrew Jackson. His roommate at West Point was future general William Tecumseh Sherman. He graduated in 1839 and was commissioned a second lieutenant in the 3rd U.S. Artillery. He fought in the Second Seminole War in Florida and was promoted to first lieutenant.

In January 1847, Ord sailed on the USS Lexington around Cape Horn with Henry Halleck and William Tecumseh Sherman. He arrived in Monterey, California, the capital of that newly acquired territory, and assumed command of Battery F, 3rd U.S. Artillery, with orders to complete Fort Mervine, which was renamed Fort Halleck. Its construction was superintended by Lieutenant Ord and his second in command, Lieutenant Sherman. On February 17, 1865, the fort was renamed Ord Barracks. In 1904, it was renamed to honor the original Presidio of Monterey.

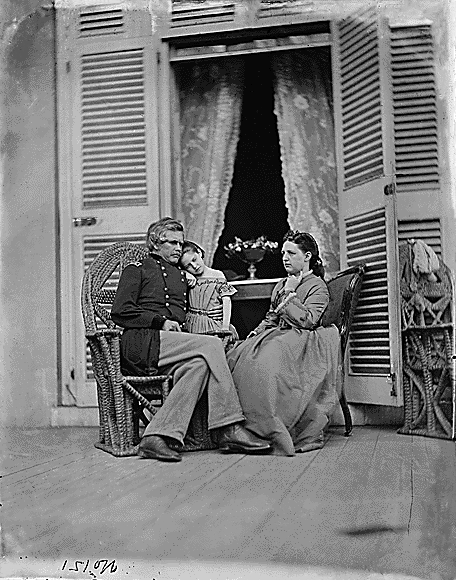
Edward O. C. Ord and his family

Ord was in California when the gold rush began, with its resultant skyrocketing prices. Since their military salaries no longer covered living expenses, Ord's commander suggested that the younger officers take on other jobs to supplement their income. In the fall of 1848, Ord and Sherman, in the employ of John Augustus Sutter, Jr., assisted Captain William H. Warner of the U.S. Army Corps of Engineers in the survey of Sacramento, California, helping to produce the map that established the future capital city's extensive downtown street grid. Ord also produced a map of the Gold and Quicksilver district of California dated July 25, 1848.

Later, Los Angeles officials needed to have a survey of the public lands in order to sell them, and Ord was hired as the surveyor. He chose William Rich Hutton as his assistant, and together the two mapped Los Angeles in July and August 1849. Thanks to the efforts of these two men, historians have a fairly good view of what the Pueblo de Los Angeles looked like in the middle of the 19th century. Lieutenant Ord surveyed the pueblo and his assistant Hutton sketched many scenes of the pueblo and drew the first map from Ord's survey. The Los Angeles City Archives has the original map produced by Hutton from Ord's survey. Ord was paid $3000 for his work on this survey. La Reina De Los Angeles, published in 1929, states that Ord was offered 160 acres of public land and 10 building sites all in the present downtown business district but accepted the $3000 instead.

Ord was promoted to captain in 1850 while serving in the Pacific Northwest. The War Department transferred him in December 1852 to the U.S. Coast Survey, which sent him to California to work on the geodetic survey of Southern California's coast and Channel Islands (California). Ord's efforts improved navigation safety as the gold rush increased both ship traffic and accidents. While assigned to Coast Survey duty, Ord divided his time between San Francisco and Los Angeles and continued to hire on as a land surveyor. In the latter role, he completed a 1854-55 survey near San Pedro that would subdivide the future town of Wilmington from the Dóminguez family's Rancho San Pedro. The same work claimed navigable waters of the adjacent estuary as federal public domain. Both results would become a foundation for development of the Port of Los Angeles in the early twentieth century. Ord transferred back to the Army in 1855. He then served in the Pacific Northwest, in campaigns against Native Americans, at Benicia Barracks, and Fort Monroe, Virginia before returning to California.

In 1859, while attending artillery school at Fort Monroe, Ord was summoned by Secretary of War John B. Floyd to quell John Brown's raid on the Harpers Ferry Federal arsenal. However, Col. Robert E. Lee reached Harpers Ferry first, and Colonel Lee telegraphed to Captain Ord that the situation was under control and Ord and his men would not be needed at Harpers Ferry. However, Ord's unit later arrived to keep order ahead of Brown's execution. Ord penned a letter to his wife on December 2, 1859, from the arsenal, describing the day and a hilltop climb with Colonel Lee.

Ord married Mary Mercer Thompson on October 14, 1854, and they eventually had thirteen children. One of their notable children was Jules Garesche Ord, who was killed in action after reaching the top of San Juan Hill in Cuba. He was the officer who started and led the charge that Teddy Roosevelt followed. Another was Edward Otho Cresap Ord, II, who was also a United States Army Major who served with the 22nd Infantry Regiment during the Indian Wars, the Spanish–American War and the Philippine–American War. He was also a painter, inventor, and poet. The son of Edward Otho Cresap Ord, II and grandson of Edward Ord was James Garesche Ord, who commanded the 28th Infantry Division and was Chairman of the Joint U.S.–Brazil Defense Commission in World War II.

== Civil War service ==
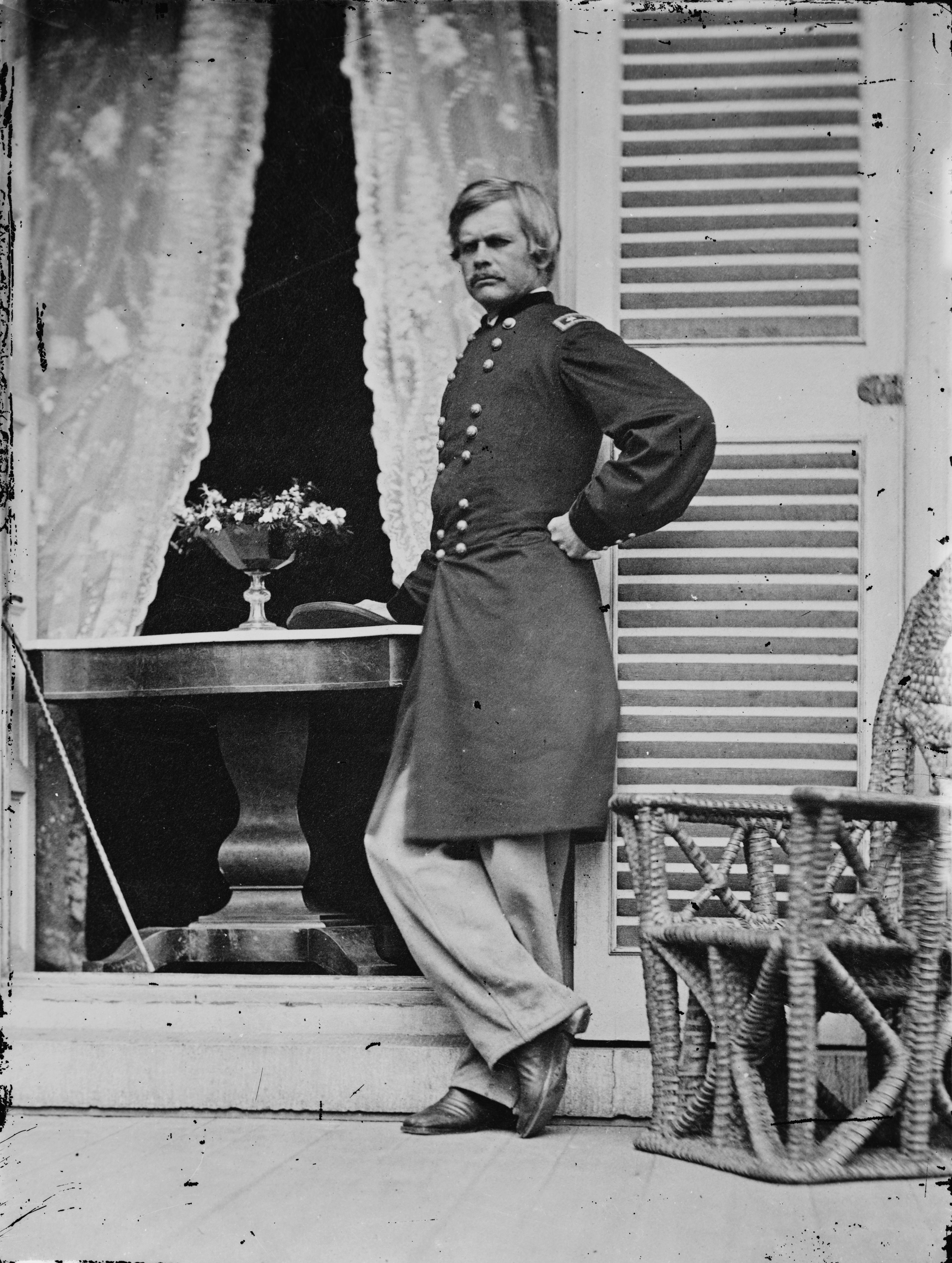
Edward Ord

At the outbreak of the Civil War in April 1861, Ord was serving as Captain of Battery C, 3rd U.S. Artillery, and also as post commander at the U.S. Army's Fort Vancouver in Washington Territory. On May 7, 1861, Ord led two companies of the 3rd Artillery from Fort Vancouver to San Francisco. After relocating to the east, Ord's first assignment was as a brigade commander in the Pennsylvania Reserves. In this capacity, he figured prominently in the Battle of Dranesville in the fall of 1861.

On May 3, 1862, Ord was promoted to the rank of major general of volunteers and, after briefly serving in the Department of the Rappahannock, was assigned command of the 2nd Division of the Army of the Tennessee. Maj. Gen. Ulysses S. Grant sent Ord with a detachment of two divisions along with Maj. Gen. William S. Rosecrans's forces to intercept Sterling Price at the town of Iuka. Due to a possible acoustic shadow Ord's forces were never engaged and Rosecrans fought alone. Ord likewise missed the fighting at Corinth but engaged the Confederate forces in their retreat at the Battle of Hatchie Bridge. There he was seriously wounded and had to leave field command only for a short time. When Grant relieved Maj. Gen. John A. McClernand from his command, Ord was conveniently situated to assume command of the XIII Corps during the final days of the Siege of Vicksburg.

From July 1863-February 1864, Ord continued to command the XIII Corps, operating in the Department of the Gulf.

In the spring of 1864, Ord was transferred back to the Eastern Theater. He spent April–July 1864 assembling and commanding Union troops in West Virginia and Maryland, in the Middle Department.

On July 21, 1864, Ord was assigned command of the XVIII Corps, during the early stages of the Siege of Petersburg. His forces were present during the Battle of the Crater but did not actively participate in the fighting. In the fall of 1864, he was seriously wounded in the attack on Fort Harrison and did not return to action until January 1865.

In March 1865, during a prisoner exchange in Virginia, Ord spoke with Confederate General James Longstreet. During their conversation, the subject of peace talks came up. Ord suggested that a first step might be for Lee and Grant to have a meeting. General Longstreet carried this idea back to General Lee, who wrote to Grant about the possibility of a "military convention" in the interest of finding what Lee called "a satisfactory adjustment of the present unhappy difficulties". Grant forwarded Lee's proposal to President Abraham Lincoln, with a request for instructions. In the end, Lincoln directed Grant to decline all such offers unless it was for the explicit purpose of accepting the surrender of Lee's army.

It was at this time, during the spring of 1865, that Ord's career peaked. He was assigned command of the Army of the James during the Appomattox Campaign. Maj. Gen. John Gibbon's corps of Ord's army played a significant role in the breakthrough at Petersburg. On April 9, he led a forced march to Appomattox Court House to relieve Maj. Gen. Philip H. Sheridan's cavalry and force Lee's surrender. General Sherman said that he "had always understood that [Ord's] skillful, hard march the night before was one of the chief causes of Lee's surrender."

Ord was present at the McLean house when Lee surrendered, and is often pictured in paintings of this event. When the surrender ceremony was complete, Ord purchased as a souvenir, for $40, the marble-topped table at which Lee had sat. It now resides in the Chicago Historical Society's Civil War Room.

After the assassination of Abraham Lincoln on April 14, 1865, many in the North, including Ulysses S. Grant, wanted strong retribution to be visited upon the Southern states. Grant called upon Ord to find out if the assassination conspiracy extended beyond Washington, D.C. Ord's investigation determined the Confederate government was not involved with the assassination plot. This helped greatly to quench the call for revenge on the former Confederate states and people.

== Postbellum ==
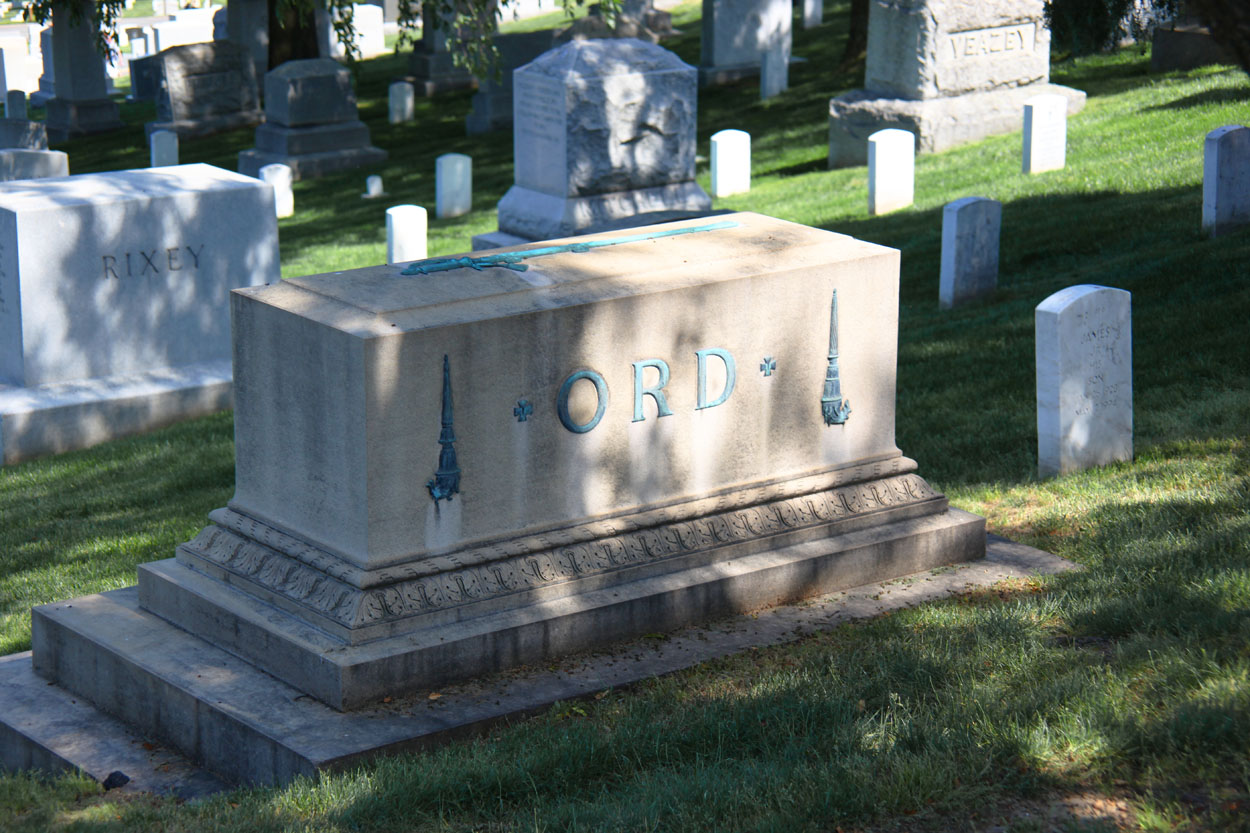
Grave of Edward Ord in Arlington National Cemetery

During Reconstruction, Ord was assigned by Lt. Gen. Ulysses S. Grant to command the Army of Occupation, headquartered at Richmond. Subsequently, he was assigned to the Department of the Ohio until he was mustered out of the volunteers in September 1866. On December 11, 1865, he received the commissions of lieutenant colonel and brigadier general in the regular army for the Battle of Hatchie Bridge and brevet major general of volunteers for the assault of Fort Harrison, all dating from March 13, 1865. Subsequently, he commanded the Department of Arkansas (1866–67), the Fourth Military District (1867–68), and the Department of California (1868–71).

Ord commanded the Department of the Platte from December 11, 1871, until April 11, 1875, when he was reassigned as the commander of the Department of Texas. He served in that role until his retirement on December 6, 1880. While he was stationed in Texas, he supervised the construction of Fort Sam Houston.

In January 1872, Ord was a member of the buffalo hunting excursion with the Grand Duke Alexei Alexandrovich of Russia on the plains of southwest Nebraska with American celebrities of the day. They included Philip Sheridan (second in command of the United States Army), Lt. Col. George Armstrong Custer, Buffalo Bill Cody, Wild Bill Hickok, and Texas Jack Omohundro.

During 1872, Ord and a soldier detachment were assigned to protect the survey parties of the Wheeler Survey as they worked in the vicinity of northeastern Utah.

In 1876, Ord was appointed military governor of the Fourth Military District which included Mississippi and Arkansas.

Ord retired from the army in 1881 with the rank of brevet major general, and at this time, General Sherman wrote of him, "He has had all the hard knocks of service, and never was on soft or fancy duty. He has always been called on when hard duty was expected, and never flinched."

Later in 1881, Ord was hired by his former commander, U. S. Grant, president of the Mexican Southern Railroad owned by Jay Gould, as a civil engineer to build a railroad line from Texas to Mexico City.

In 1882, Ord's daughter, Roberta, married a prominent Mexican general Jerónimo Treviño.

While working in Mexico, Ord contracted yellow fever. He became seriously sick while on his way from Vera Cruz to New York. He was taken ashore at Havana, Cuba, where he died in the evening of July 22, 1883. On the occasion of his death, General Sherman said of Ord, "As his intimate associate since boyhood, the General here bears testimony of him that a more unselfish, manly, and patriotic person never lived". He was buried at Arlington National Cemetery, in Arlington, Virginia.

Ord's son, Edward O. C. Ord, Jr., was also an Army officer. Ord, Jr. was a hereditary member of the Military Order of the Loyal Legion of the United States, the Sons of the American Revolution, and the Sons of the Revolution.

== Legacy ==
- Well before his death, the Southern Pacific Railroad named a station in California, along its now-abandoned Colusa Branch, Ord Bend as recognition of the nearby Ord Ranch, owned in the 1850s by Ord and two of his brothers.
- The former Fort Ord, now Fort Ord National Monument, in Monterey County, California, was named for him.
- Ord, Nebraska, was named in his honor while he was serving as commander of the Department of the Platte.
- Peaks named Mount Ord in Brewster County, Texas, and Mount Ord in Maricopa County, Arizona, are named for him.
- There is a bronze statue of Ord at Vicksburg National Military Park.
- There is a bust of Ord on display in the foyer of the University Police Department at California State University, Monterey Bay, in Seaside, California.
- The Ord-Weitzel Gate is inscribed with his name at Arlington National Cemetery, but was relocated and modified.
- There is a bust of Ord at Grant's Tomb in New York City depicting him as one of five (Sherman, Thomas, McPherson, Sheridan, and Ord) sentinels watching over the tomb of President Ulysses S. Grant.
- Ord Street in Chinatown, Los Angeles, California is named after him. There is also an Ord Street in San Francisco named for him.
- Ord Street NE in Washington, D.C., is named for him.
- In 1909 the Army named a new mine planting ship USAMP General E. O. C. Ord.

== Dates of rank ==
Insignia	Rank	Date	Component
No insignia	Cadet, USMA	1 September 1835	Regular Army
	Second Lieutenant	1 July 1839	Regular Army
	First Lieutenant	1 July 1841	Regular Army
	Captain	7 September 1850	Regular Army
	Brigadier General	14 September 1861	Volunteers
	Major	21 November 1861	Regular Army
	Major General	2 May (accepted 12 May) 1862	Volunteers
	Colonel	19 September 1862 (brevet)	Regular Army
	Lieutenant Colonel	11 December 1865	Regular Army
	Brigadier General	13 March 1865 (brevet); 26 July (accepted 15 August) 1866 (permanent)	Regular Army
	Major General	13 March 1865 (brevet); 28 January 1881 (retired)	Regular Army

== See also ==
- List of American Civil War generals (Union)

== Notes ==
Military offices
Preceded by Benjamin Butler	Commander of Army of the James; January 8, 1865-August 1, 1865	Succeeded by none
