= Malden, New York =

- CDP
- Malden-on-Hudson
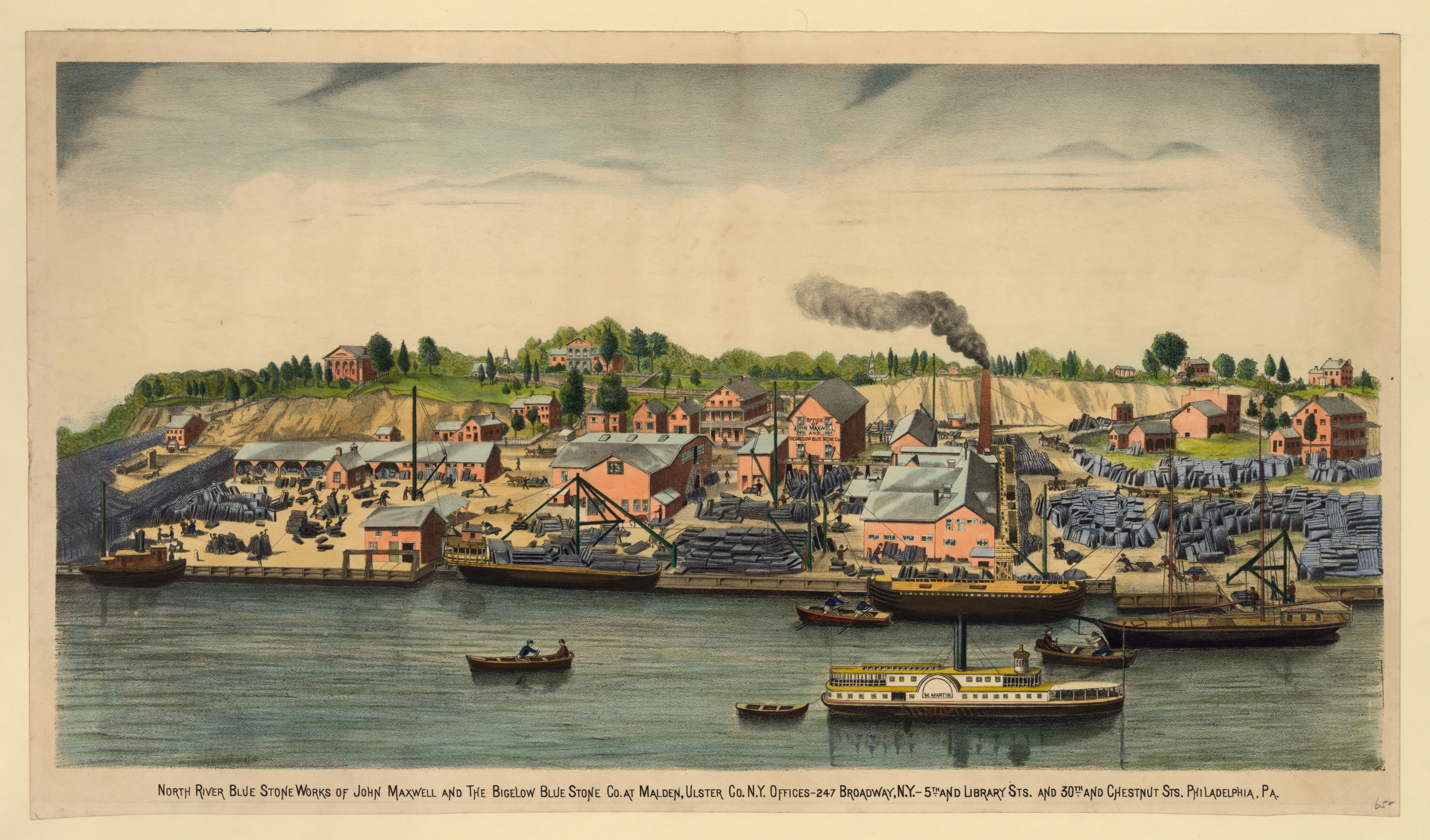
- Malden in 1875

- Location in Ulster County and the state of New York.
- Coordinates: 42°5′36″N 73°56′5″W
- Country: United States
- State: New York
- County: Ulster

Area
  - Total: 0.50 sq mi (1.30 km^{2})
  - Land: 0.50 sq mi (1.30 km^{2})
  - Water: 0 sq mi (0.00 km^{2})
- Elevation: 98 ft (30 m)

Population (2020)
  - Total: 365
  - Density: 728.5/sq mi (281.28/km^{2})
- Time zone: UTC-5 (EST)
  - Summer (DST): UTC-4 (EDT)
- ZIP code: 12453
- Area code: 845
- FIPS code: 36-44654
- GNIS feature ID: 1852904

Malden-on-Hudson (/ˈmældən/-), commonly known as Malden, is a hamlet (and census-designated place) in Ulster County, New York, United States. The population was 365 at the 2020 census.

The community of Malden is in the eastern part of the Town of Saugerties, north of the Village of Saugerties. There is a public boat launch on the Hudson River that is often used by the Malden Yacht Club, a group of local kayakers.

== Geography ==
Malden is located at 42°5′36″N 73°56′5″W (42.093279, -73.934804).

According to the United States Census Bureau, the CDP has a total area of 0.5 square miles (1.3 km^{2}), all land.

The community is on the west bank of the Hudson River.

== Demographics ==
Historical population
Census	Pop.	Note	%±
2000	413		—
2010	405		−1.9%
2020	365		−9.9%
U.S. Decennial Census

As of the census of 2000, there were 413 people, 153 households, and 106 families residing in the CDP. The population density was 813.3 inhabitants per square mile (314.0/km^{2}). There were 174 housing units at an average density of 342.7 per square mile (132.3/km^{2}). The racial makeup of the CDP was 93.95% White, 1.94% African American, 0.24% Native American, 0.48% Asian, 1.45% from other races, and 1.94% from two or more races. Hispanic or Latino of any race were 4.12% of the population.

There were 153 households, out of which 32.0% had children under the age of 18 living with them, 54.2% were married couples living together, 10.5% had a female householder with no husband present, and 30.7% were non-families. 26.1% of all households were made up of individuals, and 7.2% had someone living alone who was 65 years of age or older. The average household size was 2.70 and the average family size was 3.32.

In the CDP, the population was spread out, with 27.1% under the age of 18, 9.4% from 18 to 24, 30.0% from 25 to 44, 24.5% from 45 to 64, and 9.0% who were 65 years of age or older. The median age was 36 years. For every 100 females, there were 90.3 males. For every 100 females age 18 and over, there were 98.0 males.

The median income for a household in the CDP was $43,438, and the median income for a family was $41,250. Males had a median income of $33,558 versus $18,333 for females. The per capita income for the CDP was $17,962. About 6.4% of families and 5.5% of the population were below the poverty line, including none of those under age 18 and 27.0% of those age 65 or over.

== Education ==
The CDP is in Saugerties Central School District. Saugerties High School is the zoned comprehensive high school.
