= Opus 40 =

- U.S. National Register of Historic Places
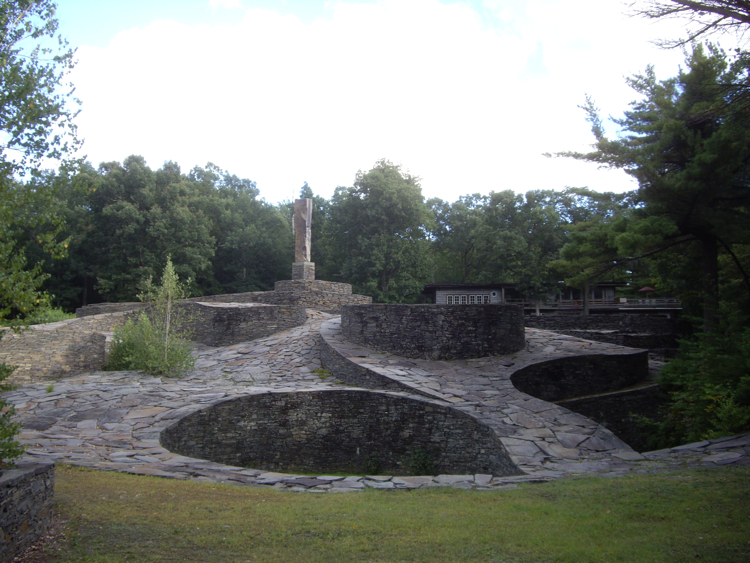

- Location within New York Location within the United States
- Location: Fite Rd., Saugerties, NY
- Coordinates: 42.050212°N 74.031544°W
- Area: 14.1 acres (5.7 ha)
- Built: 1939-1976
- Architect: Harvey Fite
- NRHP reference No.: 01000238
- Added to NRHP: March 12, 2001

Opus 40 is a large environmental sculpture in Saugerties, New York, created by sculptor Harvey Fite (1903—1976). It comprises a sprawling series of dry-stone ramps, pedestals and platforms covering 6.5 acres (2.6 ha) of a bluestone quarry.

== Description ==
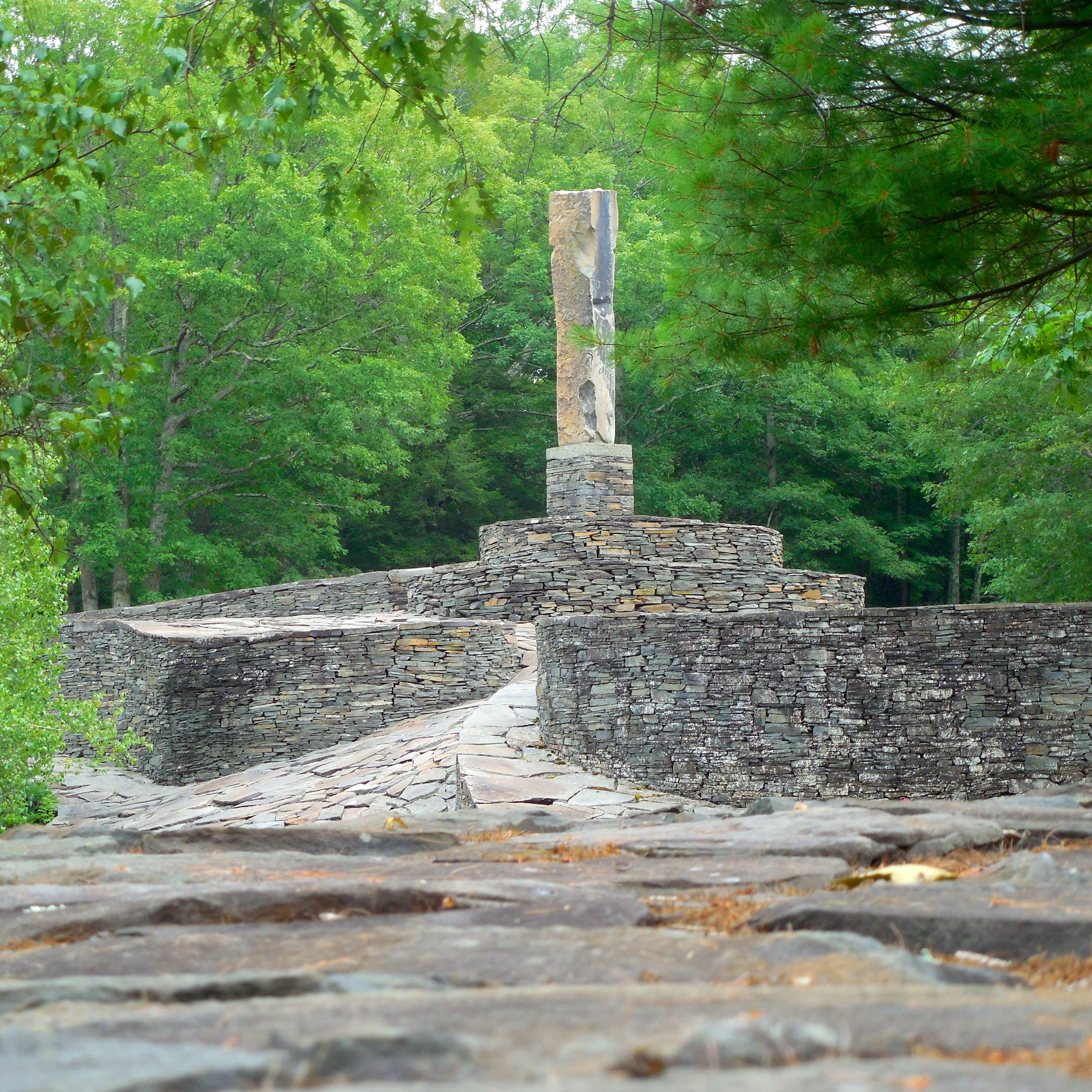
View of the monolith

Fite, then a professor of sculpture and theater at Bard College, Annandale-on-Hudson, New York, purchased the disused quarry site in 1938, expecting to use it as a source of raw stone for his representational sculpture. Instead, inspired by a season of work restoring Mayan ruins in Honduras, he began creating a space to display the large carved statues he was beginning to create out of native bluestone. Using the rubble that had been left behind as the area was quarried, he built terraces, ramps and walkways to lead to the individual works, doing all the work by hand, and using the traditional hand tools that had been used by the local quarrymen before him. As the rampwork of his open-air gallery expanded, Fite realized that the 1.5-ton (1.36 metric ton) statue, Flame, which had occupied the central pedestal, had become too small for the scale to which his work had grown, and he replaced it with a 9.5-ton bluestone pillar he had found in a nearby streambed, intent on carving it in place as his tallest bluestone sculpture to date. Fite erected the focal monolith in 1964, 25 years after he had begun work on his quarry gallery.

Though Fite's original plan was to carve the monumental river-stone in place, as his tallest bluestone sculpture to date (he had sculpted Flame in his indoor studio), once the stone was up, he realized that what he had originally conceived as a setting for sculpture had become a coherent sculpture in its own right, and a new kind of sculpture, in which carved representational work was out of place. Fite removed his other sculptures and relocated them on the surrounding grounds, and continued to work on this new sculptural concept for the remainder of his life.

In the early 1970s, after he had retired in 1969 from 35 years as a professor at Bard College, Fite built the Quarryman's Museum on the grounds, a collection of folk tools and artifacts of the quarrying era. It was around this same time that he finally succumbed to the pressure to give his masterwork a name. Stating tongue-in-cheek that “Classical composers don’t have to name things; they can just number them, Opus One, Opus Two, and so on,” Fite eventually arrived at what he felt was an apropos name. Opus is the Latin word for work, and 40 refers to the number of years he expected he would need to complete the work.

Fite died on May 9, 1976, in the 38th year of his creation, in an accidental fall while working on the ongoing project. Work stopped that day, leaving some areas unfinished—but, as his stepson, the writer Jonathan Richards, has observed, “Opus 40 is as complete as it ever would have been. It was the product of Fite’s ceaseless vision, and could only have been stopped by his death.” The following year, his widow, Barbara Fite, a close aesthetic collaborator with Fite throughout his labors, created a nonprofit group to administer Opus 40, and opened the grounds to public access to help support its preservation, including maintenance of the framing grounds that her husband had also landscaped. Barbara Fite died on October 22, 1987, and care of Opus 40 was taken over by her son Tad Richards and his wife Pat over the next several decades. Since their retirement, members of the family continue to advise the Board of Directors of the organization. Opus 40 remains a popular tourist attraction, as well as a wedding and concert venue. In 2001 it was added to the National Register of Historic Places.

== Impact ==
Brendan Gill, in the March 1989 edition of Architectural Digest, called Opus 40 "one of the largest and most beguiling works of art on the entire continent," and he has also called it “the greatest earthwork sculpture I have ever seen.” Though Harvey Fite was not associated with the Land Art or Earthworks sculptural movement of the 1970s, he came to be known as a pioneer of that movement, and was recognized in 1977 by the Hirshhorn Museum of the Smithsonian Institution, in a show entitled “Probing the Earth: Contemporary Land Projects,” as a forefather of the earthworks movement.

=== Tributes ===
- A Sonny Rollins concert at Opus 40 on August 16, 1986 was filmed for Robert Mugge's documentary Saxophone Colossus.
- The band Mercury Rev recorded "Opus 40", a song about the site, on their 1998 album Deserter's Songs.
- The music video for Amanda Palmer's interpretation of Pink Floyd's "Mother" was filmed at Opus 40 in 2017.

== See also ==
- Bishop Castle, a one-man construction project near Rye, Colorado
- Coral Castle, an oolite limestone structure created by Edward Leedskalnin
- Mystery Castle, a one-man construction project built in the 1930s in Phoenix, Arizona by Boyce Luther Gulley
