= Piñataland =

- Origin: Brooklyn, New York, USA
- Genres: alternative rock chamber rock, gypsy rock
- Years active: 1998–present
- Members: David Wechsler, Doug Stone, and a rotating cast of other musicians.
- Website: http://music.pinataland.com/

Piñataland is a Brooklyn-based musical group created by David Wechsler and Doug Stone. Their songs are often about obscure historical events and people, including:

- The pygmy Ota Benga ("Ota Benga's Name")
- The painter John Banvard ("The Ballad of John Banvard")
- The daredevil Sam Patch ("The Fall of Sam Patch")
- The elephant Topsy ("Coney Island Funeral")
- The spiritualist John Murray Spear ("Dream of the New Mary")
- The journalist William Cobbett's efforts to rebury Thomas Paine ("American Man")
- Edward Leedskalnin's Coral Castle ("Latvian Bride")
- The Inuit Minik Wallace ("If Ice Were Warm")

Pinataland have often performed at historical sites such as the Old Stone House (Brooklyn), the Cobble Hill Tunnel, and Green-Wood Cemetery. They have also covered historical tunes, such as President John Quincy Adams' campaign song "Little Know Ye Who's Comin'".

== Discography ==
- Piñataland - EP (1997)
- Songs from Konijn Kok - EP (1999)
- Songs for the Forgotten Future Volume 1 (2003)
- Songs for the Forgotten Future Volume 2 (2008)
- Hymns for the Dreadful Night (2011)
