= Nunatsiaq =

Nunatsiaq (ᓄᓇᑦᓯᐊᖅ in Inuktitut syllabics) is the Inuktitut term for the Northwest Territories. Since the creation of the territory of Nunavut in 1999, it has seen limited use in English, although it remains part of the name of several institutions from before that time.

- The Nunatsiaq News
- The former electoral district of Nunatsiaq in use from 1979 to 1997, which covered the Inuit-inhabited portions of the Northwest Territories. See Nunavut (electoral district).
