= George Michanowsky =

George Michanowsky (born Georgei Ilyich Mikhanovsky; Russian: Гео́ргий Ильи́ч Михано́вский; March 9, 1920 – November 15, 1993) is known for his interpretation of rock art in Bolivia and Mesopotamian artefacts which he interpreted as referring to a supernova explosion in the constellation Vela which he dated to about 6000 years ago. He is described by Kenn Harper as a having "claimed to be a self-taught archaeologist, linguist, Egyptologist, epigrapher, and expert in Mesopotamian astronomy.

Michanowsky was born in Yalta, Crimea in 1920 during the ongoing turmoil following the Russian Revolution.

In 1977, he published a book called The Once and Future Star in which he explained his theory of supernova explosion in the constellation Vela which happened 7,000 years ago. In the same work he also mentions that Atlantis is called NI-DUK-KI in Sumerian texts and used to be Isle of the Blest before the flood. Later on, as he explained, after the flood, it was named Dilmun. Michanowsky also suggested that global warming played an effect in Atlantis disappearance.
