= Tad Richards =

American novelist

- Born: James Richards; March 31, 1940 (age 86); Washington, D.C., U.S.
- Education: Bard College; Iowa Writers' Workshop (MFA)
- Occupations: Writer; visual artist

James (Tad) Richards (born March 31, 1940) is an American writer and visual artist. He is also artistic director and former president of Opus 40, the sculpture park in Saugerties, New York.

Richards was born in Washington, D.C. in 1940. In 1943, his mother married the sculptor Harvey Fite, who created Opus 40 from 1939 to 1976. He attended Bard College (where Fite was on the faculty) before earning a Master of Fine Arts from the Iowa Writers' Workshop. At Iowa, he studied with Paul Engle, Donald Justice and Philip Roth. He has taught literature, composition and creative writing at several institutions, including Winona State University, the State University of New York at New Paltz and Marist College.

Richards began publishing in 1964, with three poems in Poetry Magazine. During the 1960s, he was a regular contributor to The Realist, Paul Krassner's satirical magazine. His first non-pseudonymous novel, Cherokee Bill (a collaboration with his brother Jonathan Richards), was published by Dell Books in 1974. Since then, he has published 18 novels, including a novelization of the Mel Brooks movie Blazing Saddles (1974). His most recent novel is Nick and Jake (Arcade Publishing). Nick and Jake has also been produced as an audio play starring Alan Arkin, Tom Conti and Ali MacGraw. His screenwriting credits include The Cheerleaders (1973), a sexploitation film characteristic of the era.

Richards has written 16 works of nonfiction. Struggle and Lose, Struggle and Win: The Story of the United Mine Workers (written with Elizabeth Levy) was listed by The New York Times as one of the best young adult books of 1977. Several of his books on finance with Neale Godfrey have been bestsellers. He has also written extensively on music and poetry; additionally, several of his songs have been recorded by Orleans, the John Hall Band, and Fred Koller.
