= Minik Wallace =

Inuk child (1890-1918)

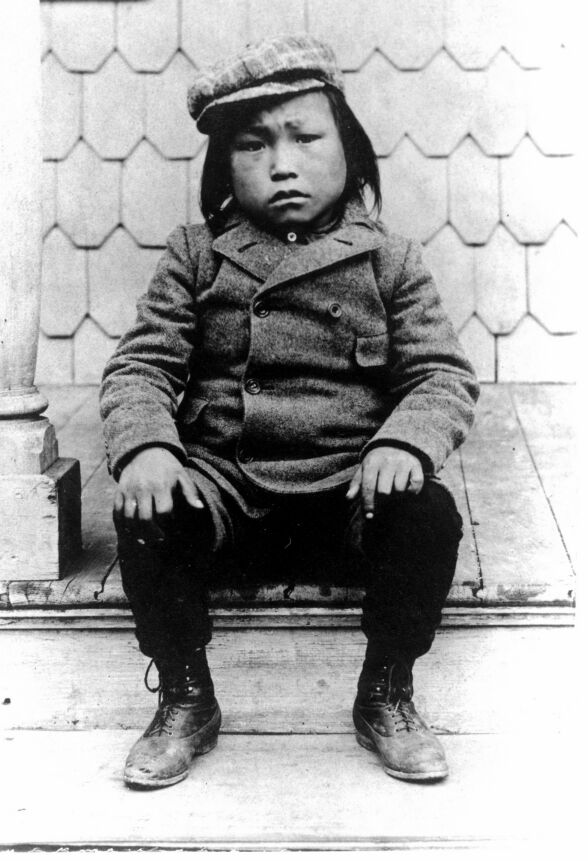
- Minik in New York shortly after his arrival, 1897.
- Born: c. 1890; Etah, Greenland, Thule area
- Died: October 29, 1918 (aged 28); Pittsburg, New Hampshire, United States

Minik Wallace (also called Minik or Mene) (c. 1890 – October 29, 1918) was an Inughuaq (Inuk) brought as a child in 1897 from Greenland to New York City with his father and others by the explorer Robert Peary. The six Inuit were studied by staff of the American Museum of Natural History, which had custody. The adults and one child died soon of tuberculosis (TB), and one young man was returned to Greenland. After deceiving Minik with a staged burial, the museum put the skeleton of his father on exhibit. Minik was adopted by William Wallace, the museum's building superintendent, and did not return to Greenland until after 1910. He returned to the United States a few years later, where he remained and worked until dying of influenza in the 1918 pandemic.

== Early years ==
Minik, son of the renowned hunter Qisuk (ca. 1858–1898) and his wife Mannik, spent his early childhood in northern Greenland among his people, the Inughuit, the northernmost band of Greenlandic Inuit. His mother died from an epidemic shortly before 1897. His father met Robert Peary when the explorer employed men of their band during several Arctic expeditions.

== Move to the United States ==
In 1896, ethnologist Franz Boas requested from Robert Peary to invite an Inuk person from Northern Greenland to the American Museum of Natural History, where Boas was curator at that time. Boas had previously worked with other indigenous people from North America, interviewing them, and hoped to disprove cultural evolution theories. In September 1897, Robert Peary brought instead six Inuit back to the museum. Aside from widower Qisuk and his son Minik, the arrivals included the shaman Atangana (ca. 1840–1898) with her husband, renowned hunter Nuktaq (ca. 1848–1898), their adoptive daughter Aviaq (ca. 1885–1898) and the young adult Uisaakassak, the fiancé of Aviaq. Although Peary had invited the adults on the trip, it is unlikely they were clearly informed as to its purpose. Some agreed to travel to see new places; others did not want to be parted from relatives. Peary had promised that they would be able to return to Greenland. Soon after their arrival, the group became the objects of study, together with the Cape York meteorite which Peary had brought. Franz Boas and the museum staff, at most expecting a single person for interviews to be conducted during the winter, had not made plans for the care of the group, nor for their return. As a result, room was made in the museum's basement to house them. Similar to ethnological expositions at the time, 20,000 people paid entrance to see the Inuit group there, who politely shook many visitor's hands.

== Death of the Inuit group ==
By November 1, 1897, all Inuit had already contracted tuberculosis (TB), a widespread infectious disease in those years, which continues to impact Inuit communities to this day. Taken to the Bellevue Hospital Center, four of them died, starting with Minik's father Qisuk on February 17, 1898. Minik pleaded for a proper burial for his father, with the traditional rites which only the Inuk could provide. The curatorial staff wanted to preserve Qisuk's body for study, research that would be impossible if his remains were buried. They staged a fake burial for Minik's benefit: filling a coffin with stones for weight, and placing a stuffed "body" covered with a cloth on top. They performed the burial by lantern light, with Minik attending. The staff sent Qisuk's body to William Wallace's estate, chief curator and superintendent of buildings at the Natural Museum. There, he had a workshop for processing the skeletons of specimens. Qisuk's remains were de-fleshed, and the skeleton was eventually mounted on an armature and returned to the museum for display. Wallace did not tell Minik about this nor of his own part in it.

In March and April, two more Inuit died. Aviaq succumbed last, on May 24. Uisaakassak, her surviving fiancé, demanded a return to Greenland upon her death, and was given passage on the Windward on July 2 that same summer.

== Adoption and adolescence ==
The seven year old Minik, still impressed by the sights of America, was not returned home but instead was adopted by the same William Wallace who had prepared his father for exposition. While no proper adoption certificates remain, Wallace still cared for Minik like for his own son Willy, who was of a similar age. Since January 1899, Minik attended Mount Hope School and was reportedly a bright student. Sometimes, journalists still took interest in the boy, reporting on his cultural change from a bewildered “savage”.

In 1901, William Wallace fell on hard times after the curator was fired from the Natural Museum of History over a case of financial irregularities and accusations of impropriety. He pleaded for the funds to raise Minik, but was refused and had to struggle on. Minik, by now about eleven years old, no longer had a carefree life growing up, but remained with Wallace. About 1906, New York papers published a story that stated Qisuk's skeleton was displayed in the museum. Minik was shocked to learn of this through classmates' comments as the story circulated.

Wallace supported Minik in requesting that Qisuk's remains be returned to the son for traditional burial. The museum director, Hermon Carey Bumpus, evaded their requests as well as tried to avoid investigation of the Inuit exhibits in general. Franz Boas, by now teaching at Columbia University, admitted the deception a decade previously, but remained largely uninterested in the matter. Meanwhile, Bumpus refused to admit the museum had Qisuk's skeleton, or the remains of the other three Inuit. Minik was never able to reclaim his father's bones.

== Return to Greenland ==
Minik tried to get Peary to return him to Greenland, but was refused in 1907. Through contacts to a scientist, Minik was able to get a college scholarship despite having dropped out from school earlier, but his third bout of severe pneumonia, result of his earlier tuberculosis, made him abandon those plans. After suicide threats and an escape to Canada, Minik was sent to Greenland on a supply ship for Peary. Although Peary's supporters told the press they had sent Minik back "laden with gifts", the Canadian author Kenn Harper found documentation that the Inuit was returned to Greenland with little more than "the clothes on his back."

By that time, Minik had forgotten Inuktun, his first language, and much of Inuit culture and skills; his life in Greenland was difficult. The elderly angakkuq Soqqaq took him in and the Inuit taught him the adult skills he needed. Minik became a fine hunter, but also brought with him knowledge of life in America. His stories were found to be wildly embellished, as Minik stylized himself as a former urban gangster. He was briefly and unhappily married. He eventually acted as a guide and translator for visitors, playing a key role in the Crocker Land Expedition of 1913–1917. At that time, Minik decided to return to the United States, and did so in 1916.

== Return to the United States and death ==
In his application for United States citizenship in January 1917, filled out in New York, Mene Peary Wallace described himself as white, dark complexion, black hair, brown eyes, no other distinctive features, adding to the form that he was unmarried, and renounced his former citizenship of Denmark.

After this return to the US, Minik worked at a variety of jobs; eventually he found work in a lumber camp in North Stratford, New Hampshire. His employer, Afton Hall, invited him to live with the Hall family, who treated him much like a son. Along with many of Hall's family and workers, Minik died during the 1918 flu pandemic, on 29 October 1918. He was buried in the Indian Stream Cemetery in Pittsburg, New Hampshire.

== Inuit burial ==
In 1986, Kenn Harper wrote a book about Minik, entitled Give Me My Father's Body. Convinced that the remains of Qisuk and the three adult Inuit should be returned to Greenland, he tried to persuade the Museum of Natural History to do this, as well as working through the "red tape" of the US and Canadian governments. In 1993, Harper succeeded in having the Inuit remains returned. In Qaanaaq, he witnessed the Inuit funeral ceremony for the remains of Qisuk and the three men that had been taken to New York.

== In popular culture ==
- The Brooklyn-based history band Piñataland recorded "If Ice Were Warm" on their 2008 album Songs for the Forgotten Future, Vol. 2. They wrote it from Minik's view.
- The historical podcast The Memory Palace dedicated an episode to Minik Wallace entitled "400 Words for 79th Street".

== See also ==
- Eksperimentet (2010)
- Greenlandic Americans
- Racism

== Bibliography ==
- Kenn Harper - Give Me My Father's Body: The Life of Minik, the New York Eskimo, New York: Washington Square Press, 2001; revised edition Minik: the New York Eskimo: an Arctic explorer, a museum, and the betrayal of the Inuit people [sic] (2017)
- Axel Engstfeld - "Minik The Lost Eskimo", (PBS: The American Experience series, 2008)
- Peter Lerangis - Smiler's Bones (Scholastic, 2005)
