= Coral Castle =

Artificial limestone structure in Florida, US

- U.S. National Register of Historic Places
- U.S. Historic district
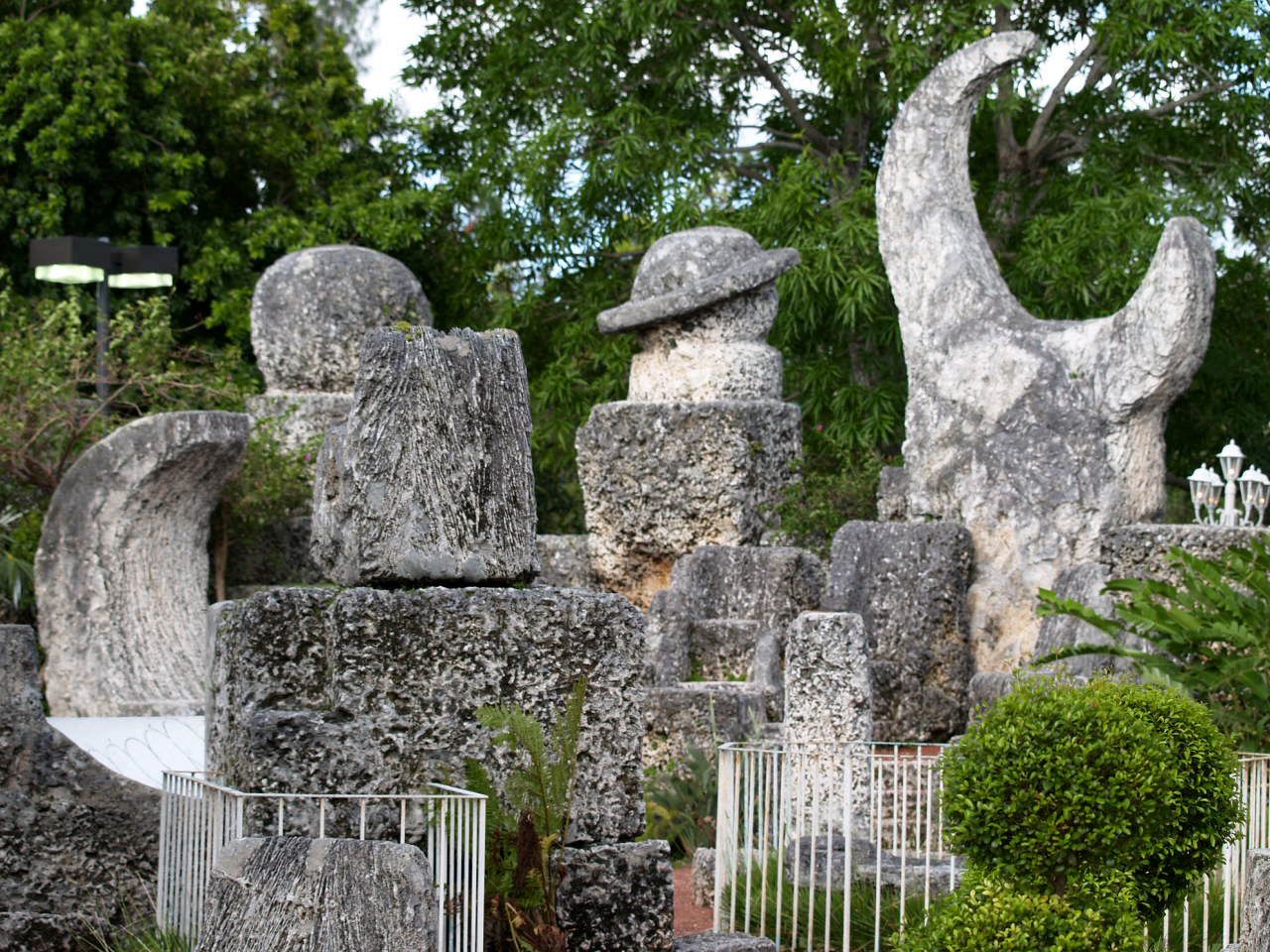
- A structure resembling the Moon, along with other structures at Coral Castle

- Location within Florida Location within the United States
- Location: Unincorporated Miami-Dade County, Florida
- Coordinates: 25°30′2″N 80°26′40″W
- Built: 1920
- Website: coralcastle.com
- NRHP reference No.: 84000840
- Added to NRHP: May 10, 1984

Coral Castle is an oolite limestone structure created by the Latvian-American eccentric Edward Leedskalnin (1887–1951). It comprises numerous large stones, each weighing several tons, sculpted into a variety of shapes, including slab walls, tables, chairs, a crescent moon, a water fountain and a sundial.

Even though Coral Castle is noted for the claim that it was built single-handedly by Leedskalnin using reverse magnetism or supernatural abilities, photographs and eyewitness accounts evidence that he used pulleys and other simple tools.

It is currently a privately operated tourist attraction, located in unincorporated territory of Miami-Dade County, Florida.

== History ==
Coral Castle's own promotional material says Edward Leedskalnin was 26 years old when he was suddenly rejected by his 16-year-old fiancée Agnes Skuvst in Latvia, just one day before the wedding. Leaving for the United States, he came down with allegedly terminal tuberculosis, but spontaneously healed, stating that magnets had some effect on his disease.

He spent more than 28 years building Coral Castle, refusing to allow anyone to view him while he worked. A few teenagers claimed to have witnessed his work, reporting that he had caused the blocks of coral to move like hydrogen balloons. The only advanced tool that Leedskalnin spoke of using was a "perpetual motion holder".

Leedskalnin originally built a castle, which he named "Ed's Place", at 18900 SW 352nd Street, Florida City, Florida 33034, around 1923. He purchased the land from Ruben Moser whose wife had assisted him when he had another very bad case of tuberculosis. Florida City, which borders the Everglades, is the southernmost city in the United States that is not on an island. At the time, it was an extremely remote location with very little development. The castle remained in Florida City until about 1936 when Leedskalnin decided to move and take the castle with him. Its second and final location has the mailing address of 28655 South Dixie Highway, Miami, FL 33033, which now appears within the census-generated overlay of Leisure City but which is actually unincorporated county territory. He reportedly chose relocation as a means to protect his privacy when discussion about developing land in the original area of the castle started. He spent three years moving the component structures of Coral Castle 10 miles (16 km) north from Florida City to its current location outside Homestead, Florida.

Leedskalnin named his new place "Rock Gate" after the huge rear swinging gate he built into the back wall. He continued to work on the castle until his death in 1951. The oolite pieces that are part of the newer castle, not among those transported from the original location, were quarried on the property only a few feet away from the castle's walls. The pool and the pit beside the northern wall are quarries. The east and west quarries have been filled in.

At Florida City, Leedskalnin charged visitors ten cents apiece to tour the castle grounds. After moving to Homestead, he asked for donations of twenty-five cents, but let visitors enter free if they had no money. There are signs carved into rocks at the front gate to "Ring Bell Twice". He would come down from his living quarters in the second story of the castle tower close to the gate and conduct the tour. He never told anyone who asked him how he made the castle. He would simply answer "It's not difficult if you know how."

When asked why he had built the castle, Leedskalnin would vaguely answer it was for his "Sweet Sixteen". This is widely believed to be a reference to Agnes Skuvst (often misspelled as "Scuffs"). In Leedskalnin's own publication A Book in Every Home, he implies his "Sweet Sixteen" was more an ideal than a reality. According to a Latvian account, the girl existed, but her name was actually Hermīne Lūsis.

When Leedskalnin became ill in November 1951, he put a sign on the door of the front gate "Going to the Hospital" and took the bus to Jackson Memorial Hospital in Miami. He suffered a stroke at one point, either before he left for the hospital or at the hospital. He died twenty-eight days later of pyelonephritis (a kidney infection) at the age of 64. His death certificate noted that his death was a result of "uremia; failure of kidneys, as a result of the infection and abscess".

While the property was being investigated, US$3,500 (equivalent to $43,413 in 2025) was found among Leedskalnin's personal belongings. He had made his income from conducting tours, selling pamphlets about various subjects (including magnetic currents) and the sale of a portion of his 10-acre (4.0 ha) property for the construction of U.S. Route 1. As he had no will, the castle became the property of his closest living relative in the United States, a nephew from Michigan named Harry.

Coral Castle's website reports that the nephew was in poor health and he sold the castle to an Illinois family in 1953. However, this story differs from the obituary of a former Coral Castle owner, Julius Levin, a retired jeweler from Chicago, Illinois. The obituary states Levin had purchased the land from the state of Florida in 1952 and may not have been aware there was even a castle on the land.

The new owners turned it into a tourist attraction and changed the name of Rock Gate to Rock Gate Park, and later to Coral Castle.

In January 1981, Levin sold the castle to Coral Castle, Inc., for US$175,000 (equivalent to $619,738 in 2025). The company retains ownership today.

In 1984, the property was listed on the National Register of Historic Places. It was added under the name of "Rock Gate", but the name on the list was changed to "Coral Castle" in 2011.

The stone sign just inside the property that says "Adm. 10c Drop Below" is not original to Coral Castle. Leedskalnin made this sign and placed it in front of his earlier location at Florida City when he was tired of giving a "free show" to visitors who were careless and trampled his shrubbery. This sign was donated by the owners of Ed's Place and placed here in subsequent years.

== The Castle ==
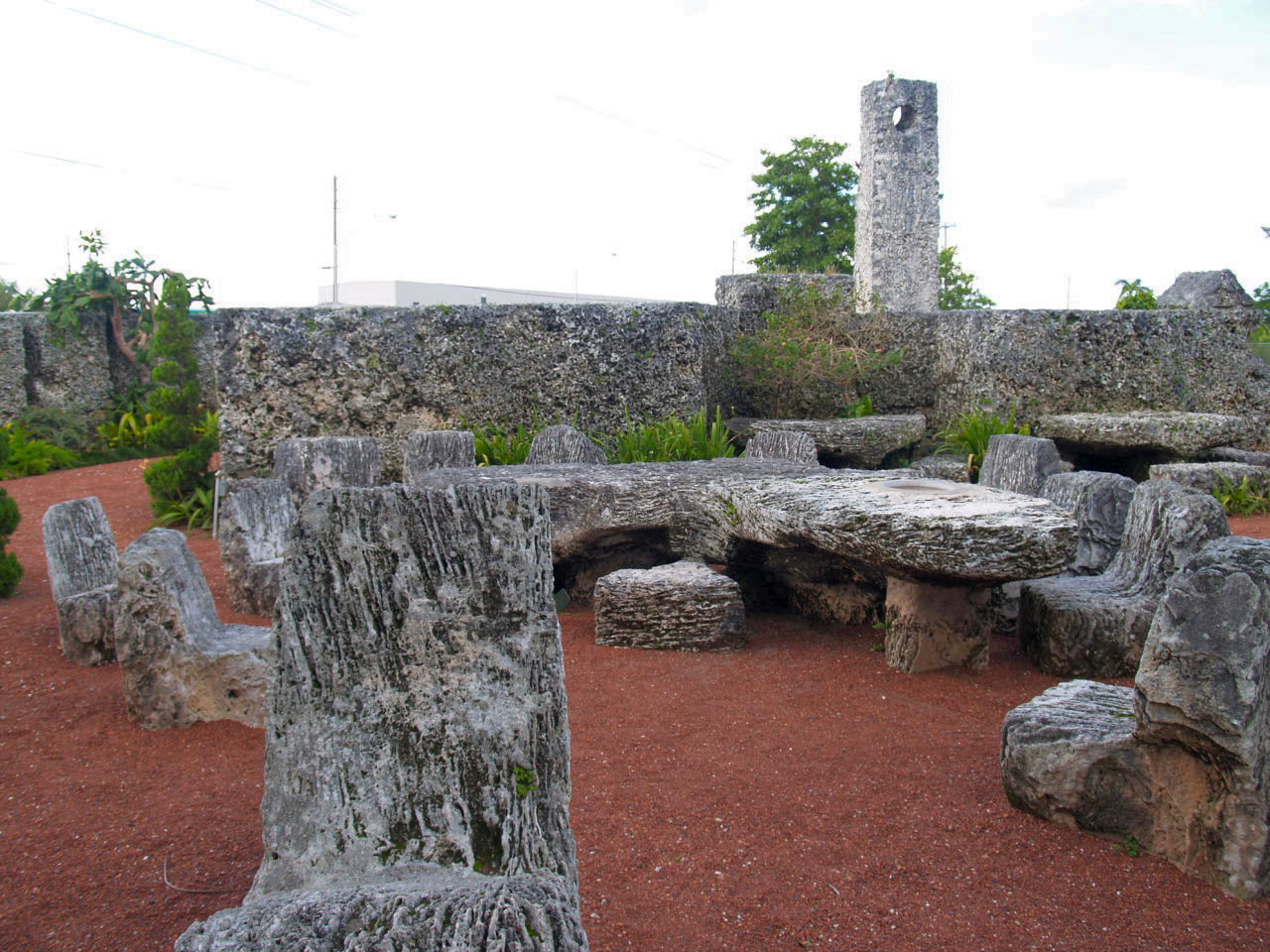
A view from within Coral Castle

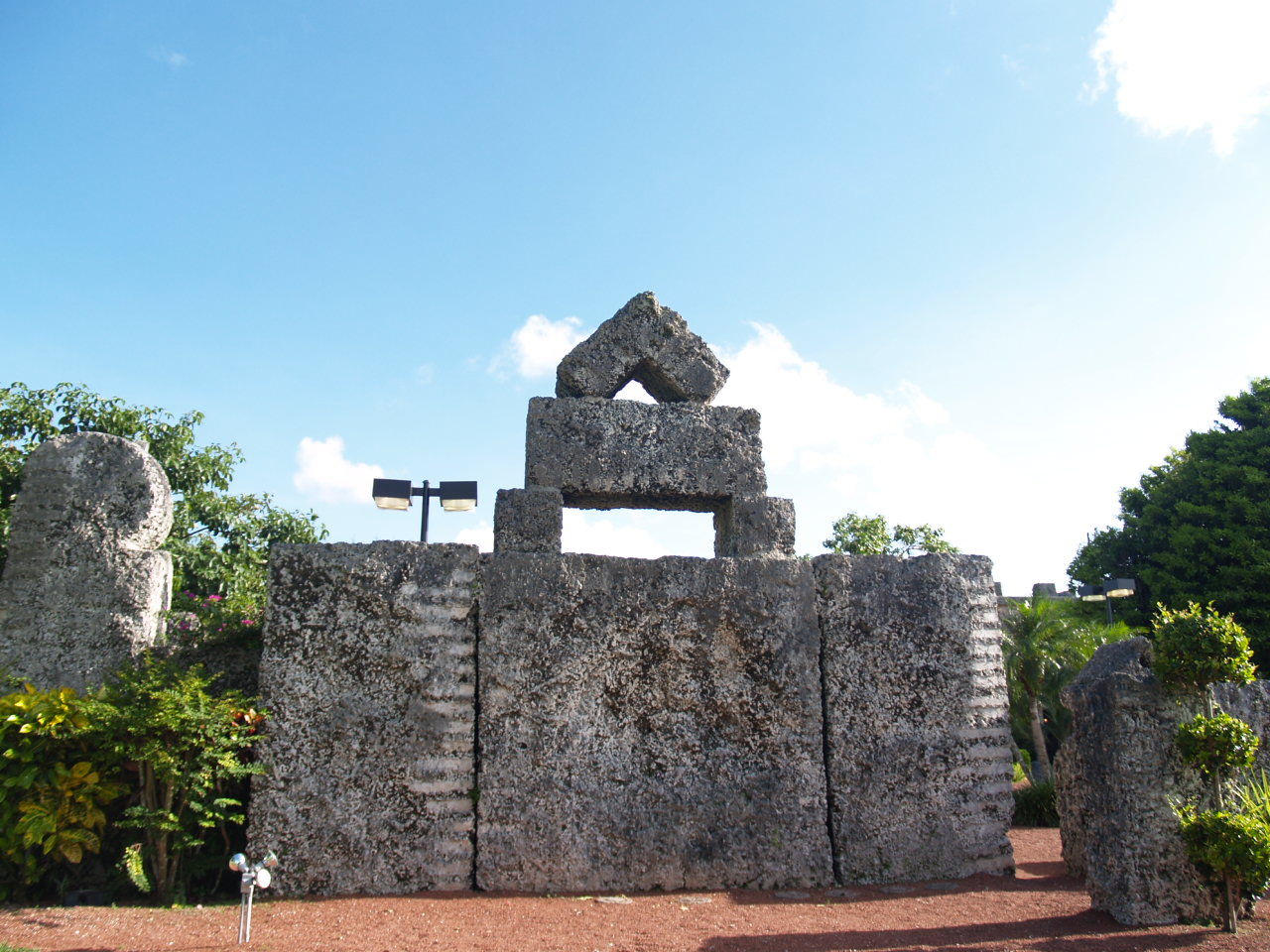
The Thirty Ton Stone

The grounds of Coral Castle consist of 1,100 short tons (1,000 t) of stones in the form of walls, carvings, furniture, and a castle tower. Commonly mistakenly believed to be made of coral, it is actually made of oolite, also known as oolitic limestone. Oolite is a sedimentary rock composed of small spherical grains of concentrically layered carbonate that may include localized concentrations of fossil shells and coral. Miami Oolite is found throughout southeastern Florida from Palm Beach County to the Florida Keys. Oolite is often found beneath only several inches of topsoil, such as at the Coral Castle site.

The stones are fastened together without mortar. They are set on top of each other using their weight to keep them together. The craftsmanship detail is so fine and the stones are connected with such precision that no light passes through the joints. The 8-foot (2.4 m) tall vertical stones that make up the perimeter wall have a uniform height. Even with the passage of decades the stones have not shifted.

Among the features and carvings are a two-storey castle tower that served as Leedskalnin's living quarters (walls consisting of 8-foot-high pieces of stone), an accurate sundial, a polar telescope, an obelisk, a barbecue, a water well, a fountain, celestial stars and planets, and numerous pieces of furniture. The furniture pieces include a heart-shaped table, a table in the shape of Florida, twenty-five rocking chairs, chairs resembling crescent moons, a bathtub, beds, and a throne.

With few exceptions, the objects are made from single pieces of stone that weigh on average 15 short tons (14 t) each. The largest stone weighs 30 short tons (27 t) and the tallest are two monoliths standing 25 ft (7.6 m) each.

A 9-short-ton (8.2 t) revolving 8-foot tall gate is a famous structure of the castle, documented on the television programs In Search of... and That's Incredible!. The gate is carved so that it fits within a quarter of an inch of the walls. It was well-balanced, reportedly so that a child could open it with the push of a finger. The mystery of the gate's perfectly balanced axis and the ease with which it revolved lasted for decades until it stopped working in 1986. In order to remove it, six men and a 50-short-ton (45 t) crane were used. Once the gate was removed, the engineers discovered how Leedskalnin had centered and balanced it. He had drilled a hole from top to bottom and inserted a metal shaft. The rock rested on an old truck bearing. It was the rusting out of this bearing that resulted in the gate's failure to revolve. Complete with new bearings and shaft, it was set back into place on July 23, 1986. It failed in 2005 and was again repaired; however, it does not rotate with the same ease it once did.

Coral Castle remains a popular tourist attraction. Books, magazines, and television programs speculate about how Leedskalnin was able to construct the structure and move stones that weigh many tons. Claims that nobody had ever seen Leedskalnin at work and that he levitated his stones have been repudiated. Orval Irwin reportedly witnessed him quarry his stones and erect parts of his wall, and illustrated the methods in his book Mr. Can't Is Dead. The Nemith Film Collection produced a short film documentary in 1944 of him at work. Coral Castle's website states that, "If anyone ever questioned Ed about how he moved the blocks of coral, Ed would only reply that he understood the laws of weight and leverage well." He also stated that he had "discovered the secrets of the pyramids", referring to the Great Pyramid of Giza.

The Coral Castle

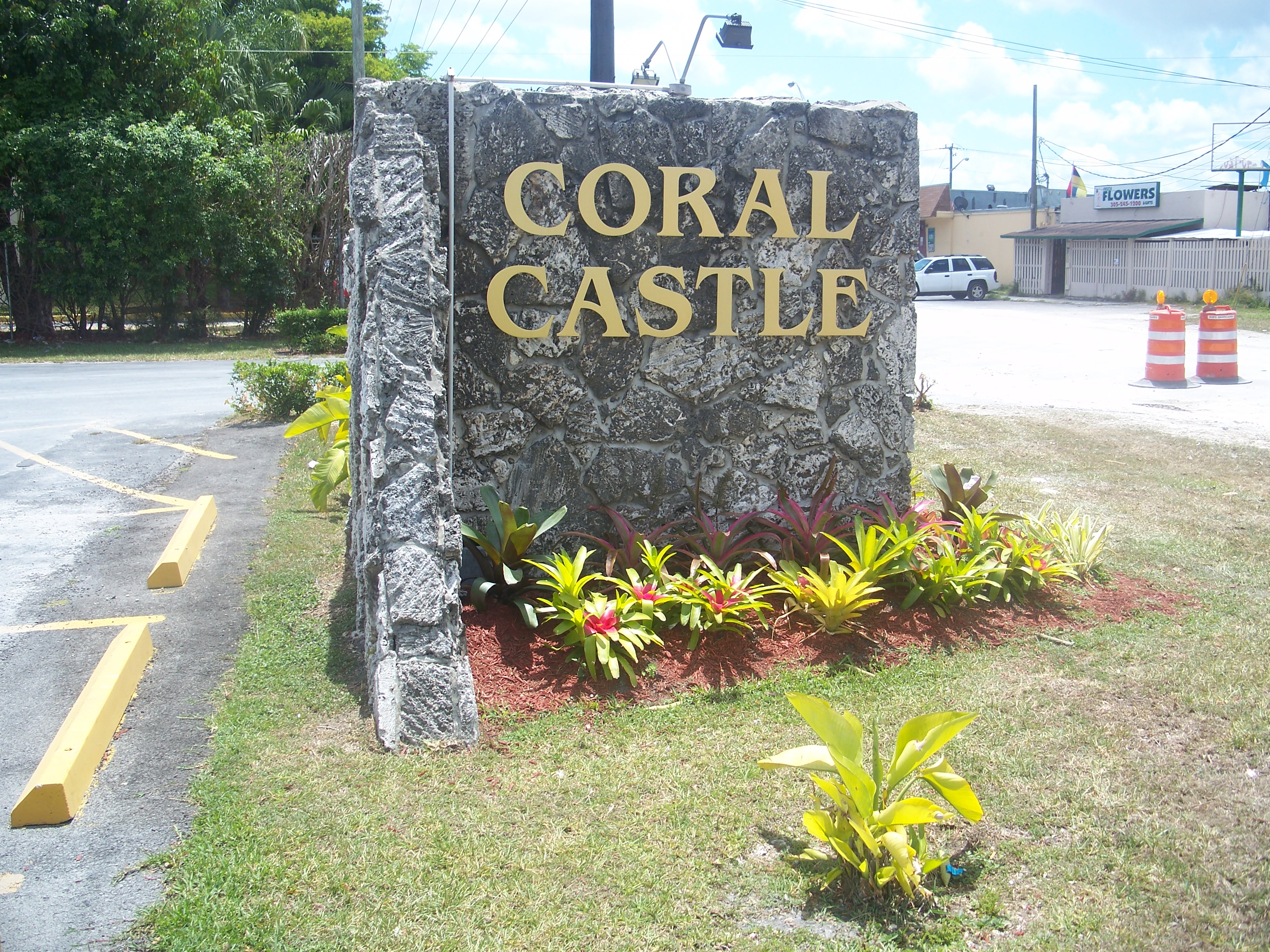

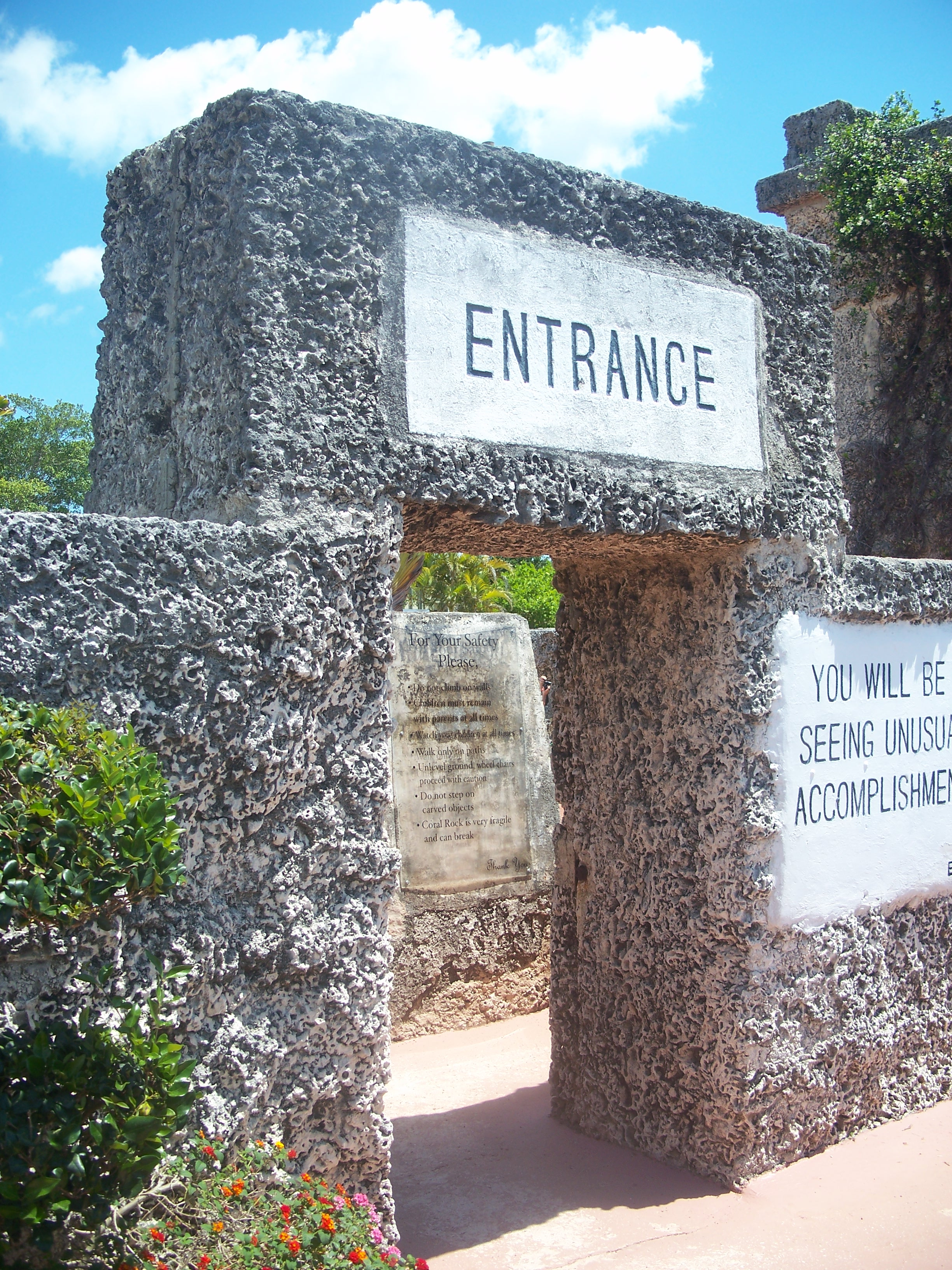

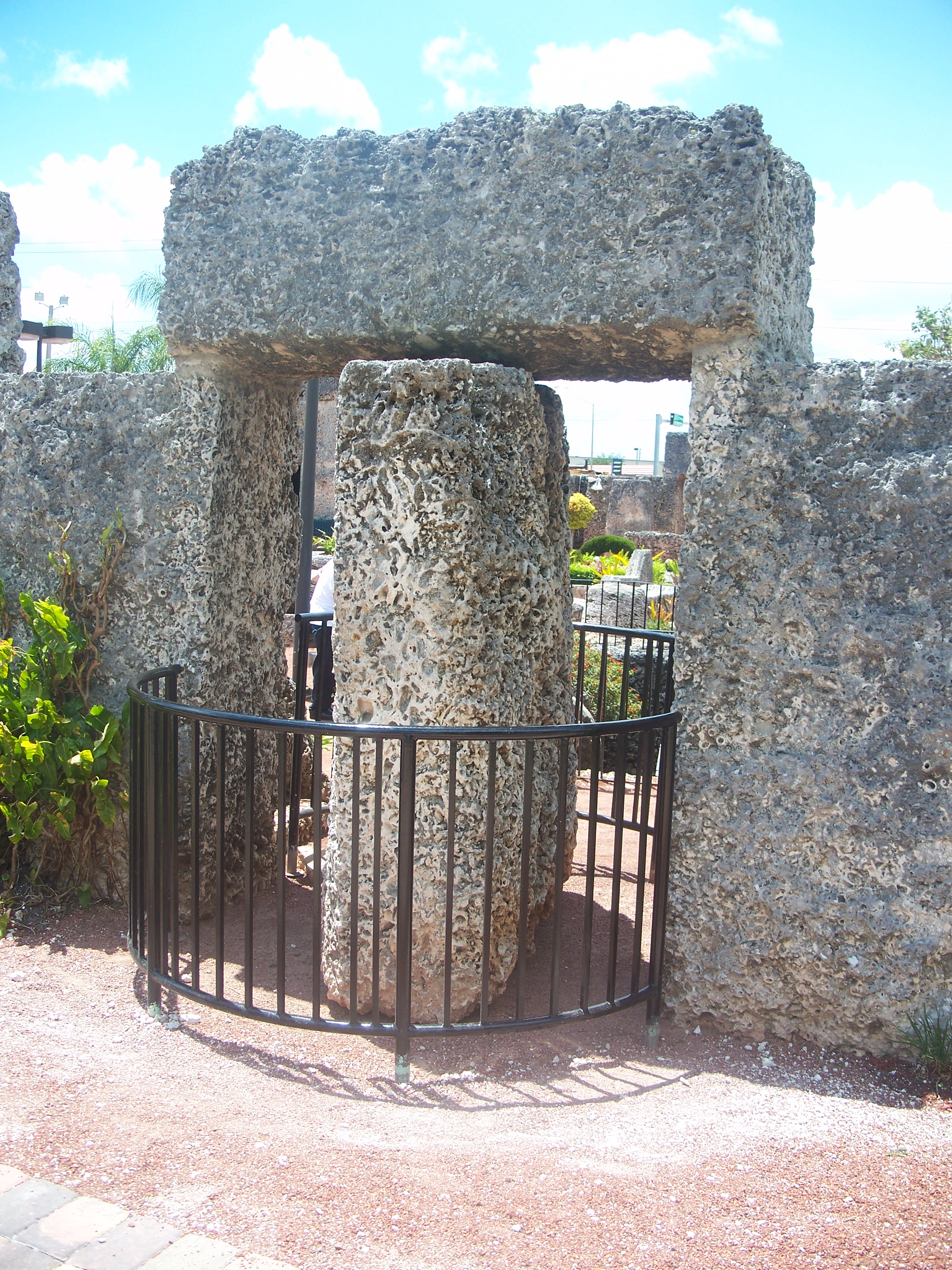

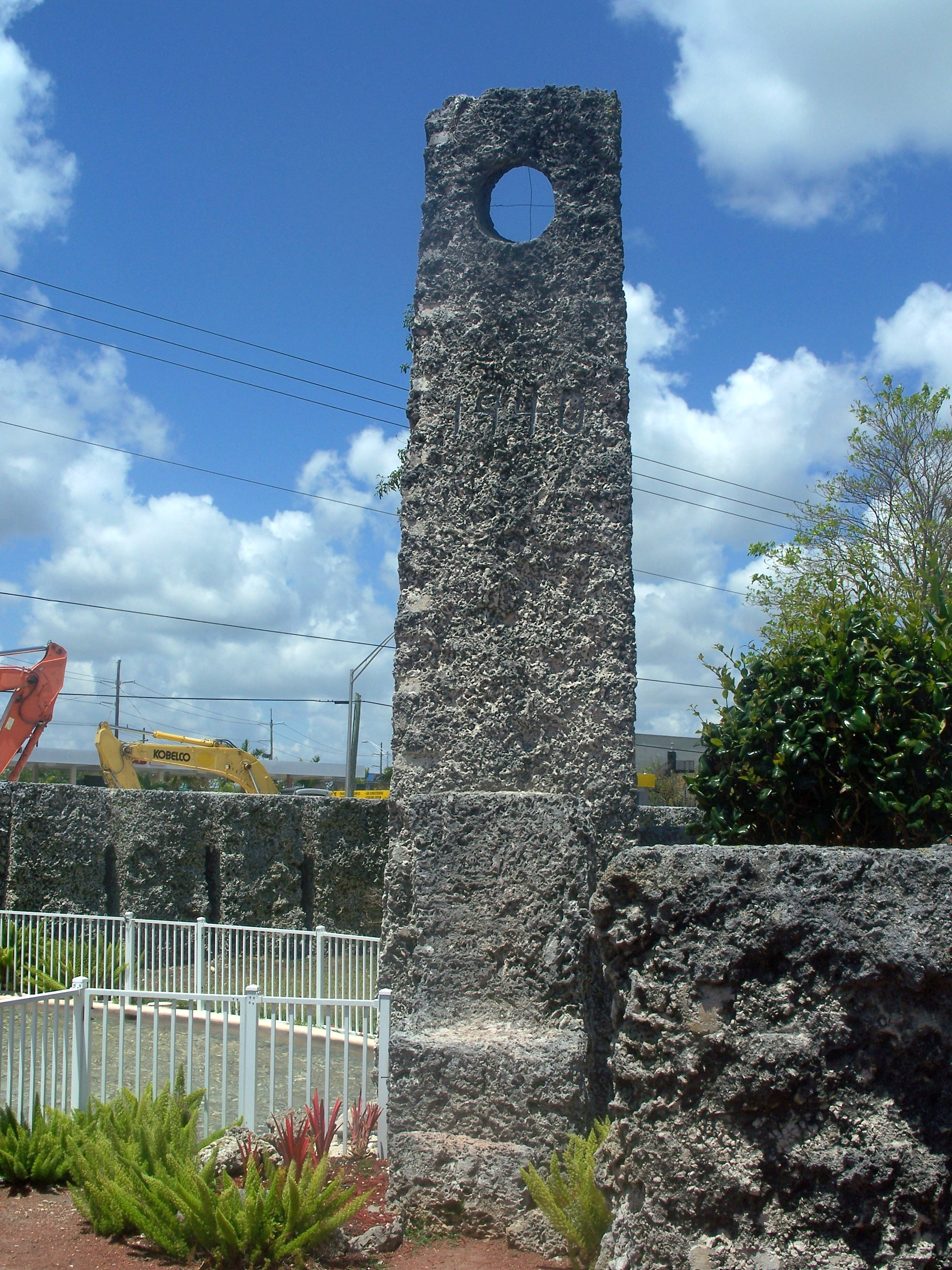

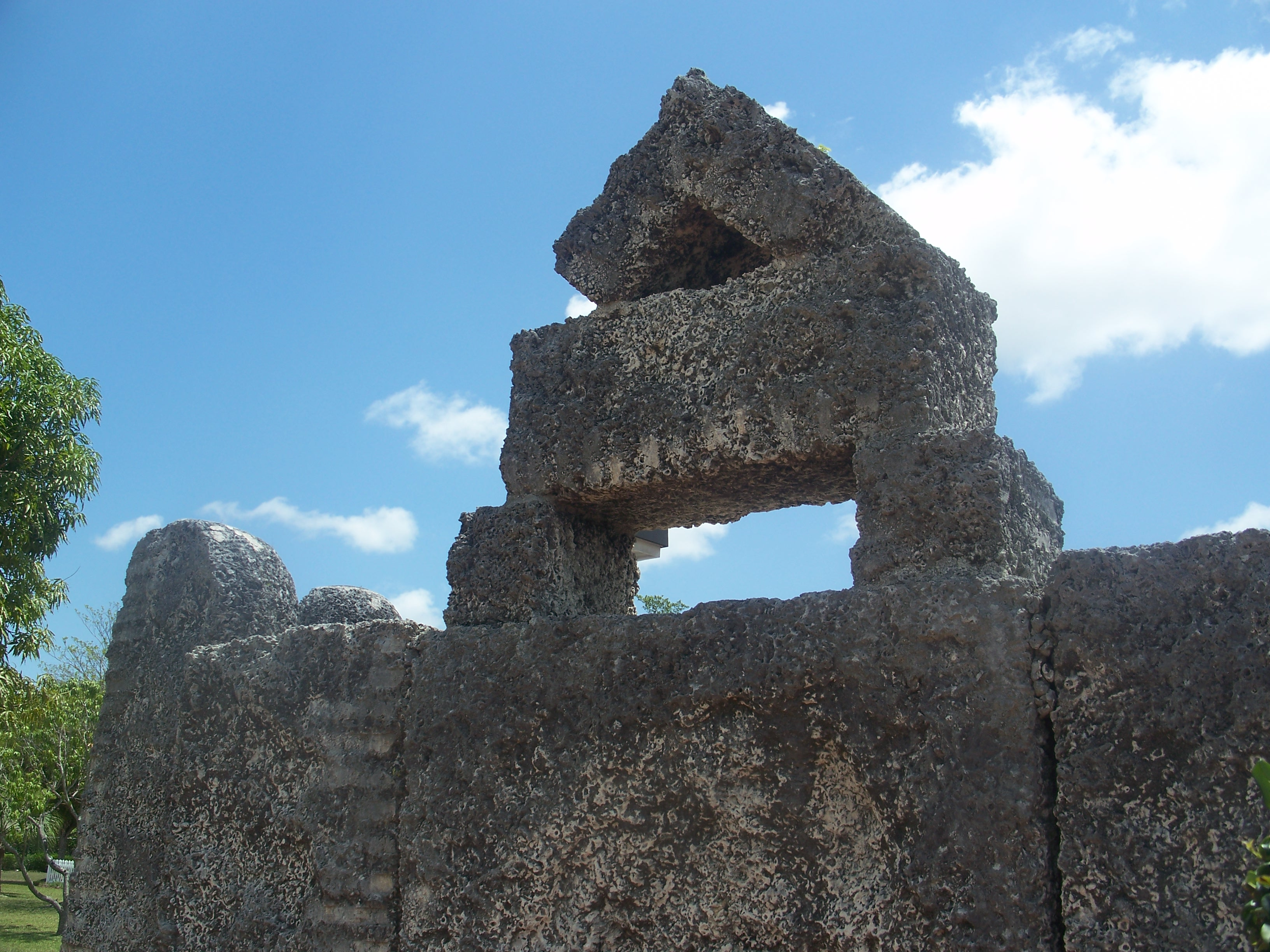

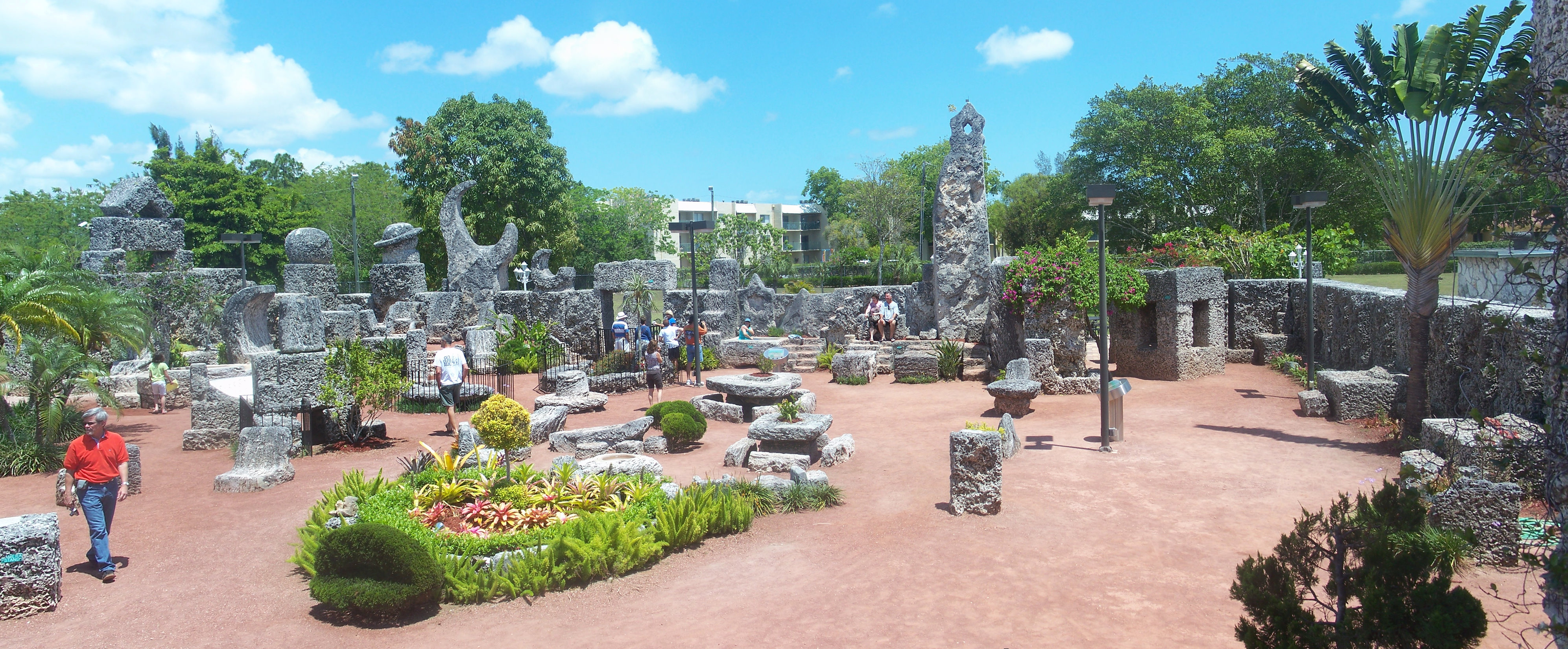

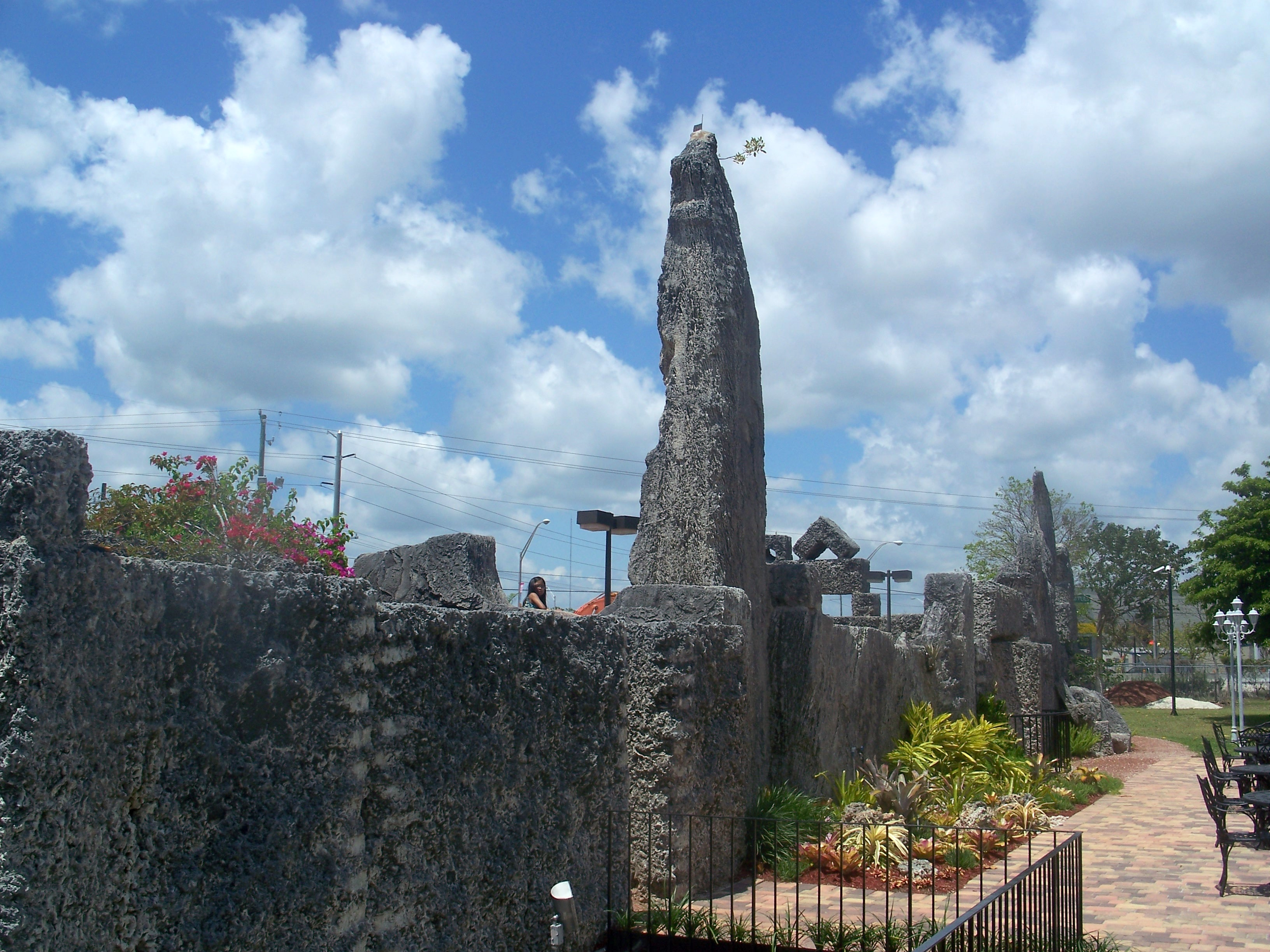

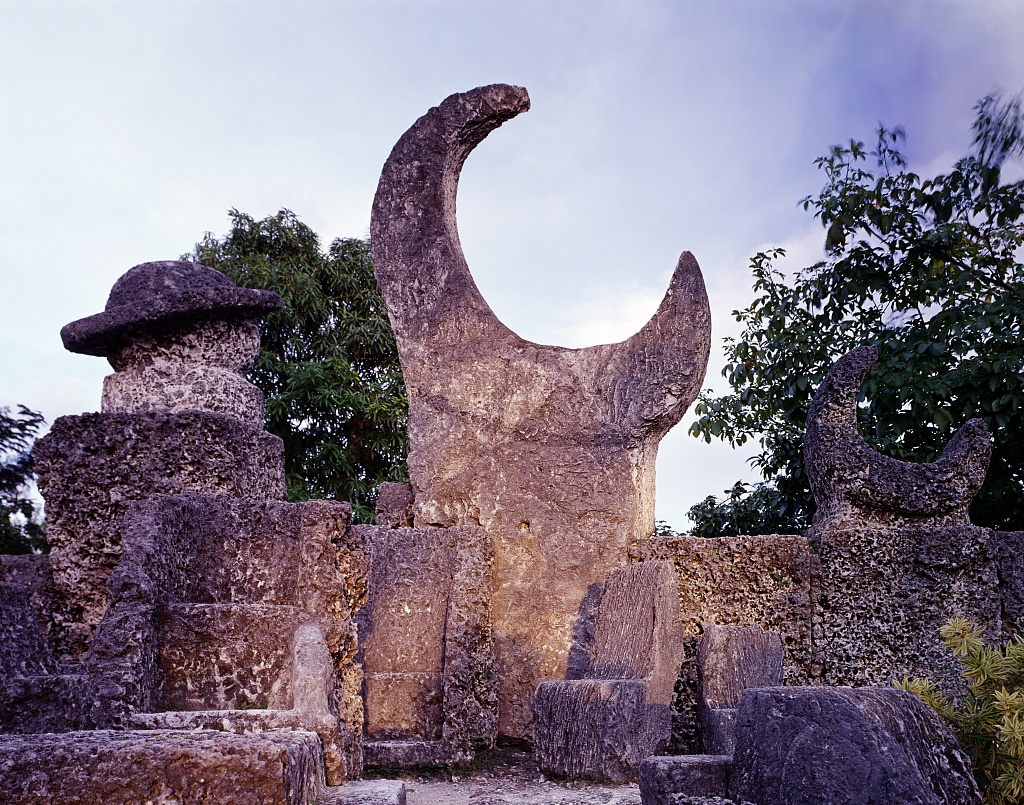

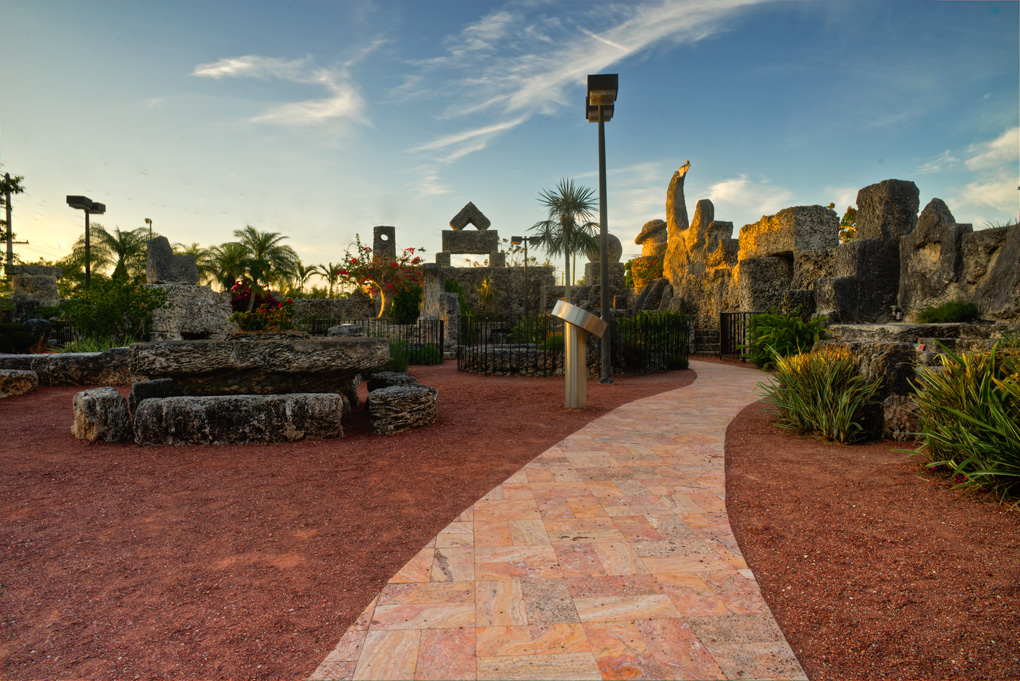

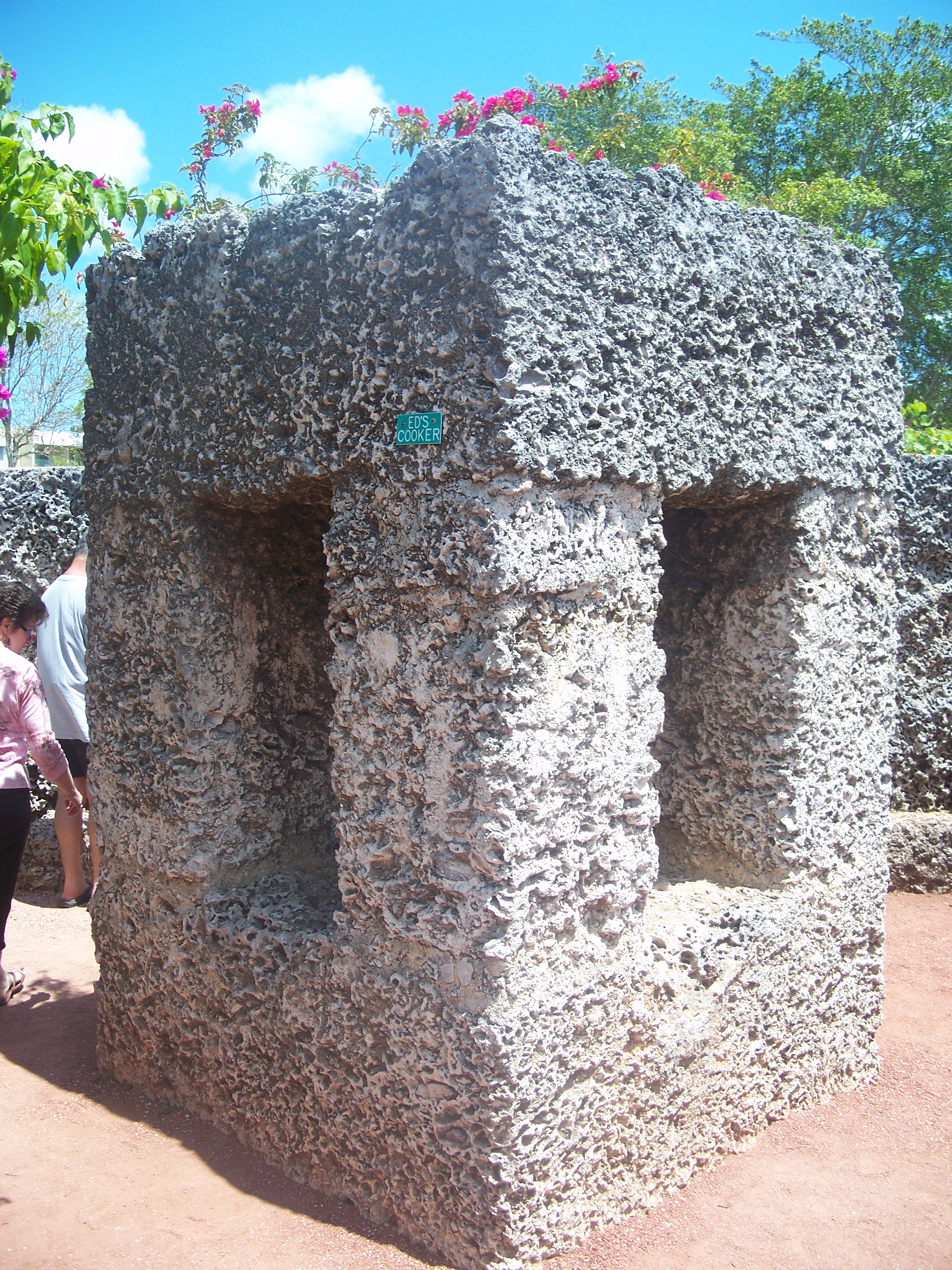

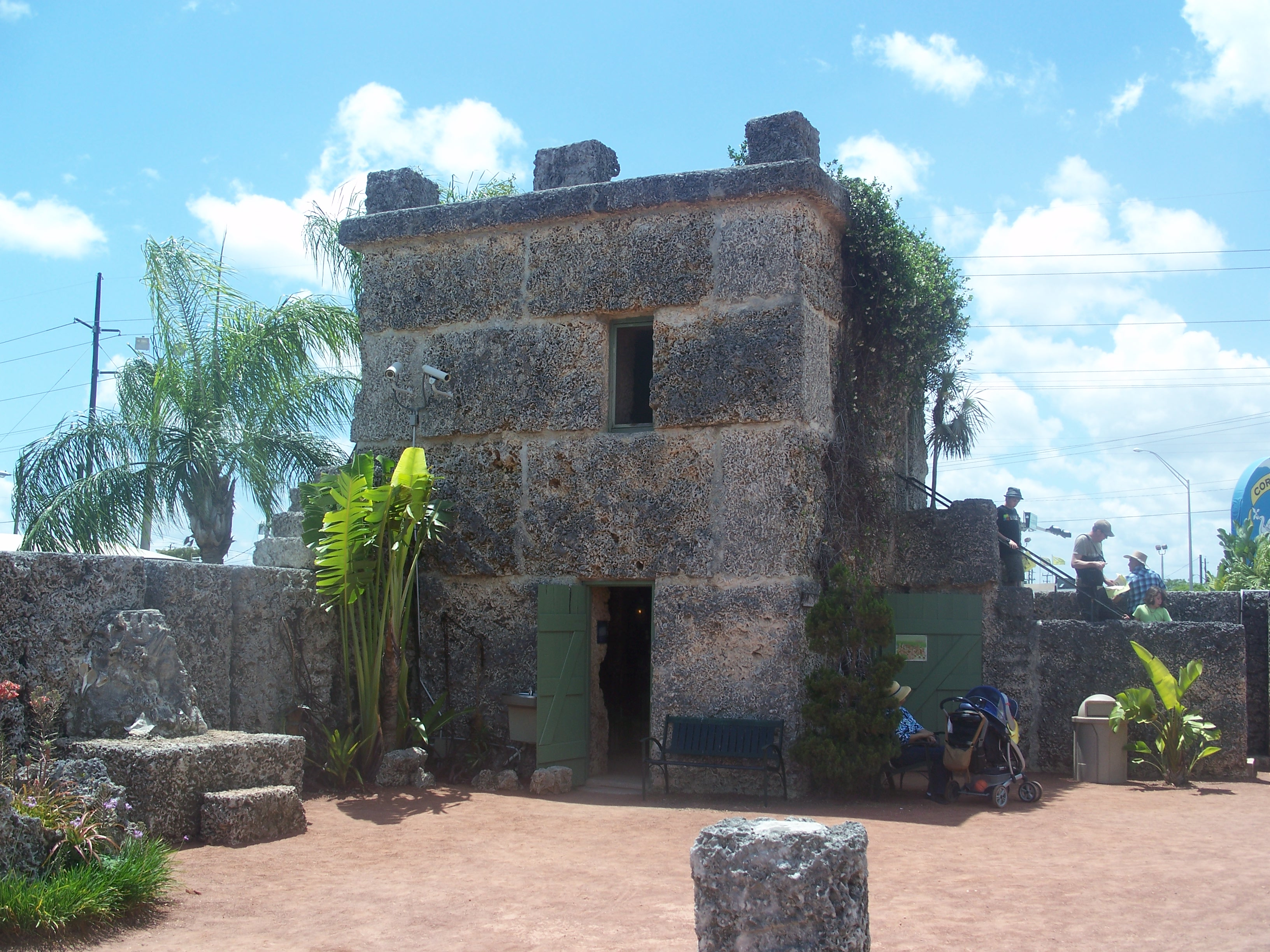

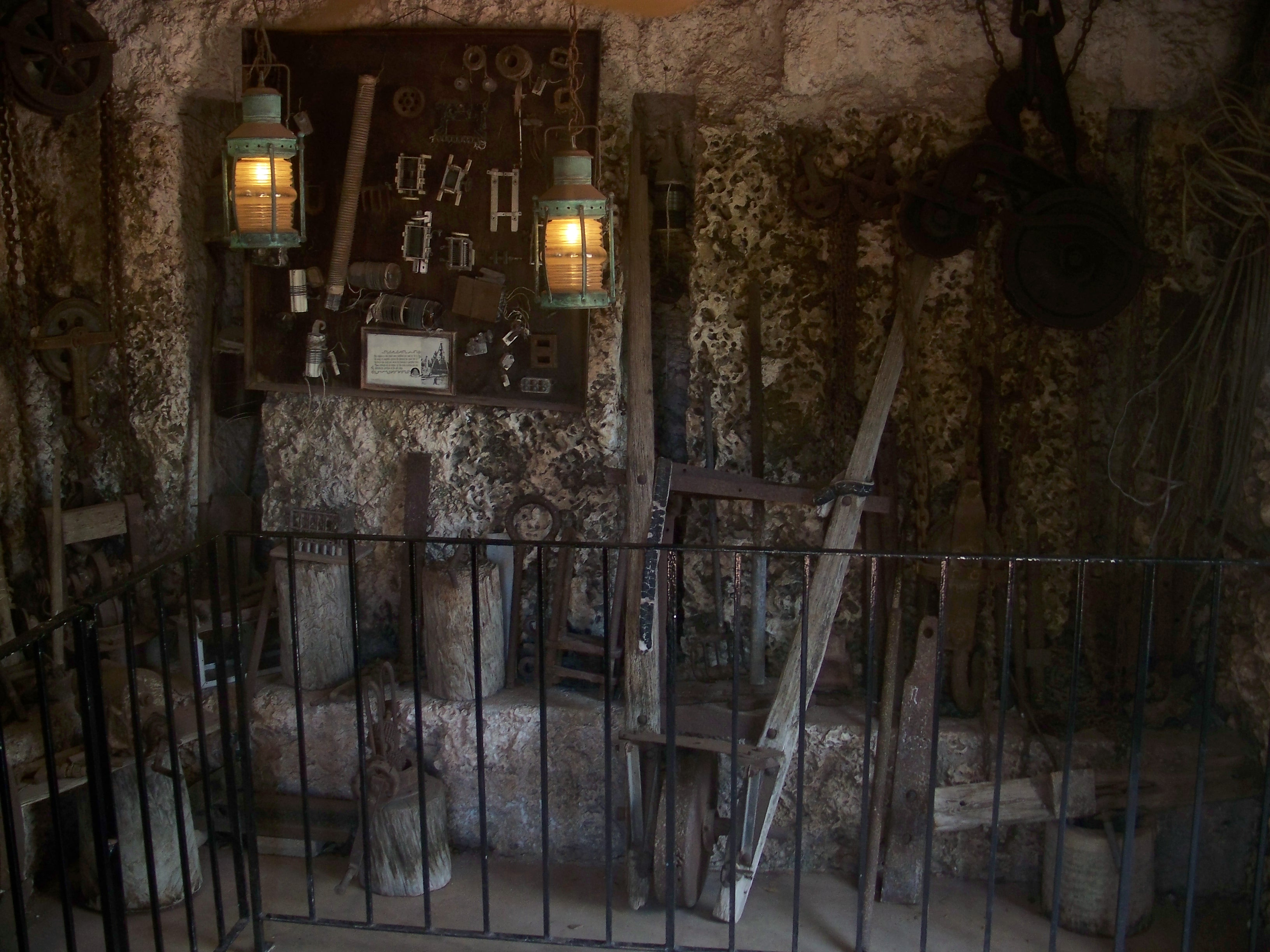

== In popular culture ==
- Coral Castle is sometimes referred to as Florida's Stonehenge.
- The 1958 film The Wild Women of Wongo used Coral Castle as the set for the dragon-god temple.
- The lunar scenes of the 1961 film Nude on the Moon were shot in Coral Castle.
- "The Castle of Secrets" is an episode of Leonard Nimoy's program In Search of... (1976–1982) that includes a dramatization of Leedskalnin moving the stones with minimal effort.
- On June 20, 2014, the History Channel aired a segment about Coral Castle in the Ancient Aliens series (Season 2, Episode 8), "Mysterious Structures".
- Billy Idol's 1986 song "Sweet Sixteen" was inspired by the story of Leedskalnin and Coral Castle.
- John Martin's book, Coral Castle Construction, released in November 2012, describes how Ed Leedskalnin built his structure based on fundamental engineering principles.
- In the video game Fortnite, a location named Coral Castle exists. It is unknown if it is in reference to the real-life Coral Castle. In August 2020, the company that owns Coral Castle sued Epic Games for trademark infringement.
- In the novel The Island of Eternal Love, by Cuban-American author Daína Chaviano, a whole chapter ("Very close to my heart") is dedicated to the history of Coral Castle and his builder Edward Leedskalnin.

== See also ==
- Bishop Castle, a one-man construction project near Rye, Colorado
- Ferdinand Cheval, a French postman who built Le Palais idéal, a similar stone castle
- Mystery Castle, a one-man construction project built in the 1930s in Phoenix, Arizona by Boyce Luther Gulley
- Opus 40, an environmental sculpture in Saugerties created by Harvey Fite
- Watts Tower, designed and built by Simon Rodia
