= Kenn Harper =

Canadian writer, historian and former businessman

Kenn Harper (aka Ilisaijikutaaq, tall teacher) is a Canadian writer, historian and former businessman. He is the author of Give Me My Father's Body, an account of Greenland Inuk Minik Wallace, had a regular column on Arctic history in Nunatsiaq News and is a former landlord.

== Early life ==
Harper relocated to the Arctic in 1966 as a teacher at Broughton Island, now known as Qikiqtarjuaq. He later lived in Padloping Island, Pangnirtung, Arctic Bay (all in the Canadian Eastern Arctic) and Qaanaaq, Greenland, and worked at various times as a teacher, development officer, and entrepreneur. He eventually settled in Iqaluit, Nunavut, where he bought the Arctic Ventures general store, which was previously owned by Bryan Pearson. He sold the company to Arctic Co-operatives Limited in 2012.

Harper became known as a historian of the Arctic. For ten years (2005-2015), he wrote "Taissumani", a regular column on Arctic history in Nunatsiaq News. He is a Fellow of the Royal Geographical Society, and the Royal Canadian Geographical Society. In 1986 he published Give Me My Father's Body: The Life of Minik, the New York Eskimo, which tells the story of Minik Wallace, a member of the Inughuit or "Polar Eskimo" tribe who was among a group taken by Robert Peary from his home in northwest Greenland to New York City. It was republished under the same title in 2000 by Steerforth Press. In 2017 Steerforth Press published a much-expanded version, containing new information on Minik's life, under the title Minik, The New York Eskimo.

From 2005 to 2017, Harper was Honorary Danish Consul, an unpaid posting in Iqaluit. On 9 June 2014, Harper was recognized by the Government of Denmark for his work with the presentation of the Order of the Dannebrog. The appointment of Ridder (Knight) had been made in April and was approved by the Government of Canada.

Harper is also an enthusiastic wrestling fan, notable for bringing Maximum Pro Wrestling to Iqaluit as a charity show to raise money for youth sports.

Harper is fluent in English, Inuktitut and conversational Danish.

== Works ==
- Give Me My Father's Body: The Life of Minik, The New York Eskimo. Iqaluit: Blacklead Books, 1986, and South Royalton, Vermont: Steerforth Press, 2000.
- In Those Days: Collected Writings on Arctic History. Book 1: Inuit Lives. Iqaluit: Inhabit Media, 2014. ISBN 978-1927095584
- In Those Days: Collected Writings on Arctic History. Book 2: Arctic Crime and Punishment. Iqaluit: Inhabit Media, 2015.
- Minik, The New York Eskimo. Hanover, New Hampshire: Steerforth Press, 2017.
- Thou Shalt Do No Murder: Inuit, Injustice and the Canadian Arctic. Iqaluit: Nunavut Arctic College Media, 2017.
- In Those Days: Collected Writings on Arctic History. Book 3: Tales of Arctic Whaling. Iqaluit: Inhabit Media, 2018.
- In Those Days: Collected Writings on Arctic History. Book 4: Shamans, Spirits, and Faith in the Inuit North. Iqaluit: Inhabit Media, 2019.
- In Those Days: Collected Writings on Arctic History. Book 5: Inuit and Explorers. Iqaluit: Inhabit Media, 2022.
