= Edward Leedskalnin =

Builder of Coral Castle

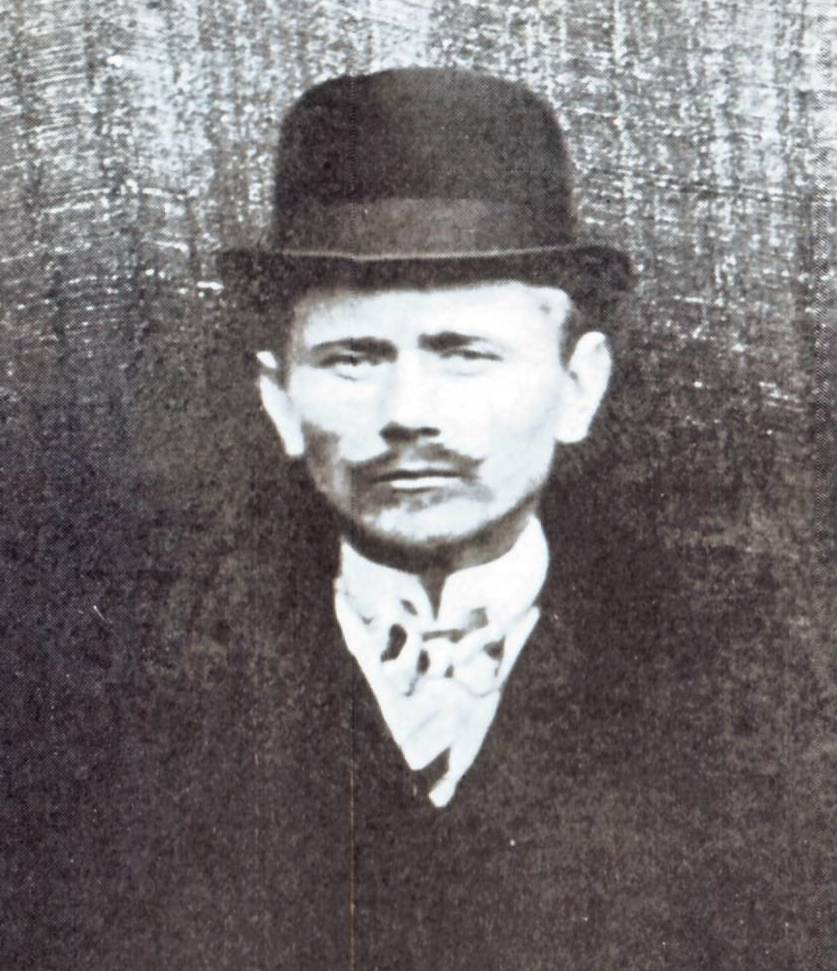
- Edward Leedskalnin, c. 1910
- Born: Edvards Liedskalniņš; January 12, 1887; Stāmeriena Parish, Kreis Walk, Governorate of Livonia, Russian Empire
- Died: December 7, 1951 (aged 64); Miami, Florida, U.S.
- Known for: Coral Castle

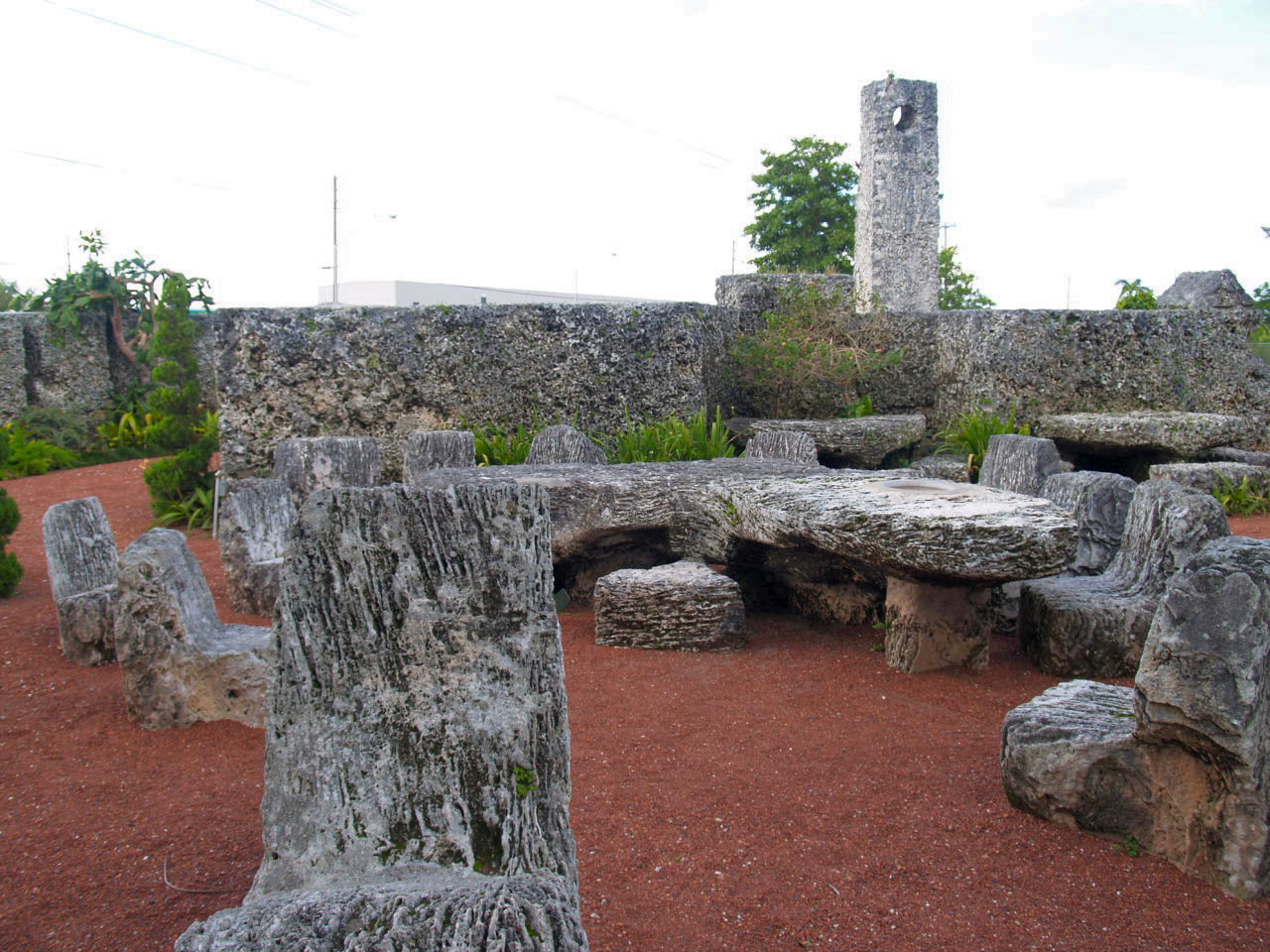
A view from within Leedskalnin's Coral Castle.

Edward Leedskalnin (Latvian: Edvards Liedskalniņš) (January 12, 1887 – December 7, 1951) was a Latvian immigrant to the United States, a self-taught engineer who single-handedly built the Coral Castle in Florida, added to the National Register of Historic Places in 1984 and the developer of some eccentric theories of magnetism.

== Life ==
Edward Leedskalnin was born on January 12, 1887, in Stāmeriena Parish, Latvia. He was the fifth son of Mina and Andrejs Liedskalniņš, who were farmers on rented land. It's during his time in Latvia that it's believed under the tutelage of his father that Leedskalnin learned stonemasonry. Little is known of his childhood, aside from the fact that his parents were not wealthy and he received only a fourth-grade formal education. Edward was a sickly boy who often spent time reading books, helping him to develop an inquisitive mind and lifelong yearning for knowledge. It was suggested that he learned stonemasonry from his father and practiced this craft in Latvia after coming of age.

At the age of 26 he was engaged to marry Agnes Skuvst who was ten years younger. However, the girl who Leedskalnin later referred to as his "Sweet Sixteen" broke their engagement. He then decided to emigrate to North America.

On April 7, 1912, Leedskalnin arrived in New York City. After looking for suitable work around the East Coast until August, he relocated to the Pacific Northwest, which was experiencing a logging boom. On June 5, 1917, while in Oregon, he filled in his draft registration, stating that he was self-employed and engaged in ax-handle manufacturing. The 1920 census data reveal that he resided in Reedsport, Oregon.

In the winter of 1922–1923, after allegedly contracting tuberculosis, Leedskalnin moved to the warmer climate of Florida, where he purchased an undeveloped parcel of land in Florida City, which at the time was lightly inhabited. On February 27, 1923 The Homestead Enterprise newspaper published a notice that "E. Leedskalnin a Californian has purchased an acre of the R. L. Moser homestead and is planning to erect a home soon."

Over the next 20 years, Leedskalnin constructed a massive structure that he called "Rock Gate" and dedicated, in his own words, to the girl who had left him years before. Working alone and mostly at night, Leedskalnin eventually quarried and sculpted more than 1,100 short tons (997,903 kg) of oolite limestone into an architectural and engineering landmark that would later be known as the Coral Castle. He used various basic tools available under his modest means including salvaged timber and old automobile parts. First, he built a house out of limestone blocks and wood, then he gradually constructed the stone structure for which he is now famous. With a reserved personality, he eventually opened the Coral Castle to the public, offering tours for 10 cents.

When people were asking Leedskalnin how he had moved all of the heavy stone on his own, he usually replied, "I understand the laws of weight and leverage and I know the secrets of the people who built the pyramids", referring to the Great Pyramid of Giza. Some local residents later remembered that as school children they had field trips to the construction site of the future Coral Castle, and Leedskalnin personally explained manual methods of his work.

In the 1920s, the structure with an assortment of sculpted stones was located in Florida City; then, in the mid-1930s, Leedskalnin hired a truck with a driver to move it to its present location on a 10-acre (4.0 ha) site in the adjacent Homestead, Florida. Leedskalnin was an eccentric and lived on an exclusive diet of only crackers and sardines. In his later years, he starved himself.

== Death ==
On November 9, 1951, he checked himself into Jackson Memorial Hospital in Miami. Apparently, Leedskalnin suffered a stroke either before he left for the hospital or at the hospital. He died twenty-eight days later of pyelonephritis (kidney infection) at the age of 64. His death certificate noted that his death was a result of "uremia; failure of kidneys, as a result of the infection and abscess".

== Publications ==
Leedskalnin published five pamphlets on various subjects, advertising them in local newspapers.

Magnetic Current was first published in 1988 and the only source for any of these pamphlets is the Coral Castle gift shop.

=== Moral education ===
His first and longest booklet, a treatise on moral education, is printed on only the left-hand pages, and begins with the following preface:

"Reader, if for any reason you do not like the things I say in the little book, I left just as much space as I used, so you can write your own opinion opposite it and see if you can do better."

— The Author

In the first section, Leedskalnin argues that girls should be kept pure, and that boys are primarily a soiling influence upon them. On page 4 of A Book in Every Home, Leedskalnin writes:

"Everything we do should be for some good purpose but as everybody knows there is nothing good that can come to a girl from a fresh boy. When a girl is sixteen or seventeen years old, she is as good as she ever will be, but when a boy is sixteen years old, he is then fresher than in all his stages of development. He is then not big enough to work but he is too big to be kept in a nursery and then to allow such a fresh thing to soil a girl — it could not work on my girl. Now I will tell you about soiling. Anything that is done, if it is done with the right party it is all right, but when it is done with the wrong party, it is soiling, and concerning those fresh boys with the girls, it is wrong every time."

The second section continues along the theme of moral education, with several aphorisms aimed at parents regarding the proper way to raise children. The last, "Political" section, reveals that the reclusive Leedskalnin had strong political views. He advocates voting for property owners only (and in proportion to their holdings), and argues that "Anyone who is too weak to make his own living is not strong enough to vote."

Some writers have suggested that Leedskalnin's booklet contains further information on his electromagnetic research and philosophies encoded in its pages, and the blank pages are provided for the reader to fill in their decrypted solutions. It has also been suggested that Leedskalnin's frequent referral to his "Sweet Sixteen" may in fact refer to the numerological and/or scientific relevance of the number sixteen to his research and theories.

He wrote that a mother's most important task is to ensure that her daughter remains "chaste and faithful":

"In case a girl's mamma thinks that there is a boy somewhere who needs experience then she, herself, could pose as an experimental station for that fresh boy to practise on and so save the girl. Nothing can hurt her any more. She has already gone through all the experience that can be gone through and so in her case it would be all right."

=== Magnetism ===
Leedskalnin became interested in the general theory of magnetism. His four pamphlets addressed interaction of electricity, magnetism and the body; Leedskalnin also included a number of simple experiments to validate his theories.

Contradicting the standard model of electromagnetism, but remarkably in line with the concept of "magnetic moment" / "electron spin theory", his thesis is based upon the theory that the metal is not the magnet and that the real magnets are circulating in the metal. These individual north and south pole magnets are particles smaller than atoms or photons and each particle in the substance is an individual magnet on its own.

Leedskalnin claimed that all matter was being acted upon by what he called "individual magnets". He also claimed that scientists of his time were looking in the wrong place for their understanding of electricity and that they were observing only "one half of the whole concept" with "one-sided tools of measurement"

Magnets in general are indestructible. For instance you can burn wood and flesh. You can destroy the body, but you cannot destroy the magnets that hold together the body. They go somewhere else. Iron has more magnets than wood, and every different substance has a different number of magnets that hold the substance together. If I make a battery with copper for positive terminal and beef for negative terminal I get more magnets out of it than when I used copper for positive terminal and sweet potato for negative terminal. From this you can see that no two things are alike.

== In popular culture ==
Ed Leedskalnin and his megalithic creation of Coral Castle became a part of the American popular culture due to the magnitude of a single man's effort and ingenuity. Some conjectured that he used esoteric ancient knowledge to levitate blocks of stone and move them with the aid of the Earth's magnetic energy. Other explanations center on Leedskalnin's stonemasonry and logging experiences that allowed him to apply his work skills to a tedious process of moving large blocks of stone using levers, wheels, axles, pulleys, ramps, and wedges without any electrical equipment.

The emotional side of Ed Leedskalnin's life story drew the attention of authors, songwriters and performers, including:

- Billy Idol recorded the song "Sweet Sixteen" for his Whiplash Smile album. It was based on the love story of Leedskalnin and his runaway girl. The music video was recorded at Coral Castle in 1986.
- The Brooklyn-based band Piñataland recorded a song about Leedskalnin, titled "Latvian Bride", for their 2003 album Songs for the Forgotten Future Vol. 1.
- Andrew Peterson recorded a song, "The Coral Castle", in his Carried Along (2002) studio album that evoked Leedskalnin's broken heart story.
- Cuban-American author Daína Chaviano, dedicated a whole chapter ("Very close to my heart") from her novel The Island of Eternal Love to the history of Coral Castle and his builder Edward Leedskalnin.

== Bibliography ==
- Leedskalnin, Edward. A Book in Every Home. Containing Three Subjects: Ed's Sweet Sixteen, Domestic and Political Views (Reprinted ed.). Health Research Books. ISBN 9780787313906.
- Leedskalnin, Edward (1945). Magnetic current. Homestead, Florida: Rock Gate. (originally published in 1936)

== See also ==
- Towers of Simon Rodia
- Electromagnetic lock — about the "Magnetic Motion Holder" experiment of magnetic current
