= Jonathan Richards (author) =

American novelist

Jonathan Richards (born 1941) is an American author, journalist, actor, and cartoonist. He was born in Washington, DC, in 1941, and educated at South Kent School and Brown University.

== As author ==
Nick & Jake, written with his brother Tad Richards (Arcade Publishing, 2012, is an epistolary novel set in the Joseph McCarthy era in 1953, and mixes characters drawn from real life and from classic fiction. The Richards brothers’ previous novels include the three-volume Whitmarsh Chronicles, a generational trilogy set against the background of the American labor movement; and Cherokee Bill, historical fiction set in the Indian Territory in the waning days of the Old West. Solo novels include Tularosa, a historical novel, and Santa Fe, a contemporary novel of greed and growth in the capital of New Mexico.

== As cartoonist ==
His political cartoons are seen regularly on the website WhoWhatWhy.

Book illustration includes Cosmo by Alan Arkin.

== As film critic ==
He is a member of the Online Film Critics Society.
