= Nunatsiaq News =

Canadian newspaper in Nunavut

- Type: Weekly newspaper
- Format: Tabloid
- Owner: Nortext Publishing Corp
- Managing editor: Corey Larocque
- Staff writers: Kenn Harper
- Founded: 1973
- Language: English; Inuktitut
- Headquarters: A-157 Nipisa St., Iqaluit, Nunavut
- City: Iqaluit
- Country: Canada
- Circulation: 50,000+
- Website: nunatsiaq.com

Nunatsiaq News (Inuktitut: ᓄᓇᑦᓯᐊᕐᒥ ᐱᕙᓪᓕᐊᔪᑦ) is a Canadian weekly newspaper in operation since 1973 based in Iqaluit, serving as the newspaper of record for the territory of Nunavut and the Nunavik region of Quebec. The paper is published online on a daily basis, and in print on a weekly basis by Nortext Publishing Corporation. Co-op stores in Nunavut and Nunavik distribute the newspaper free of charge.

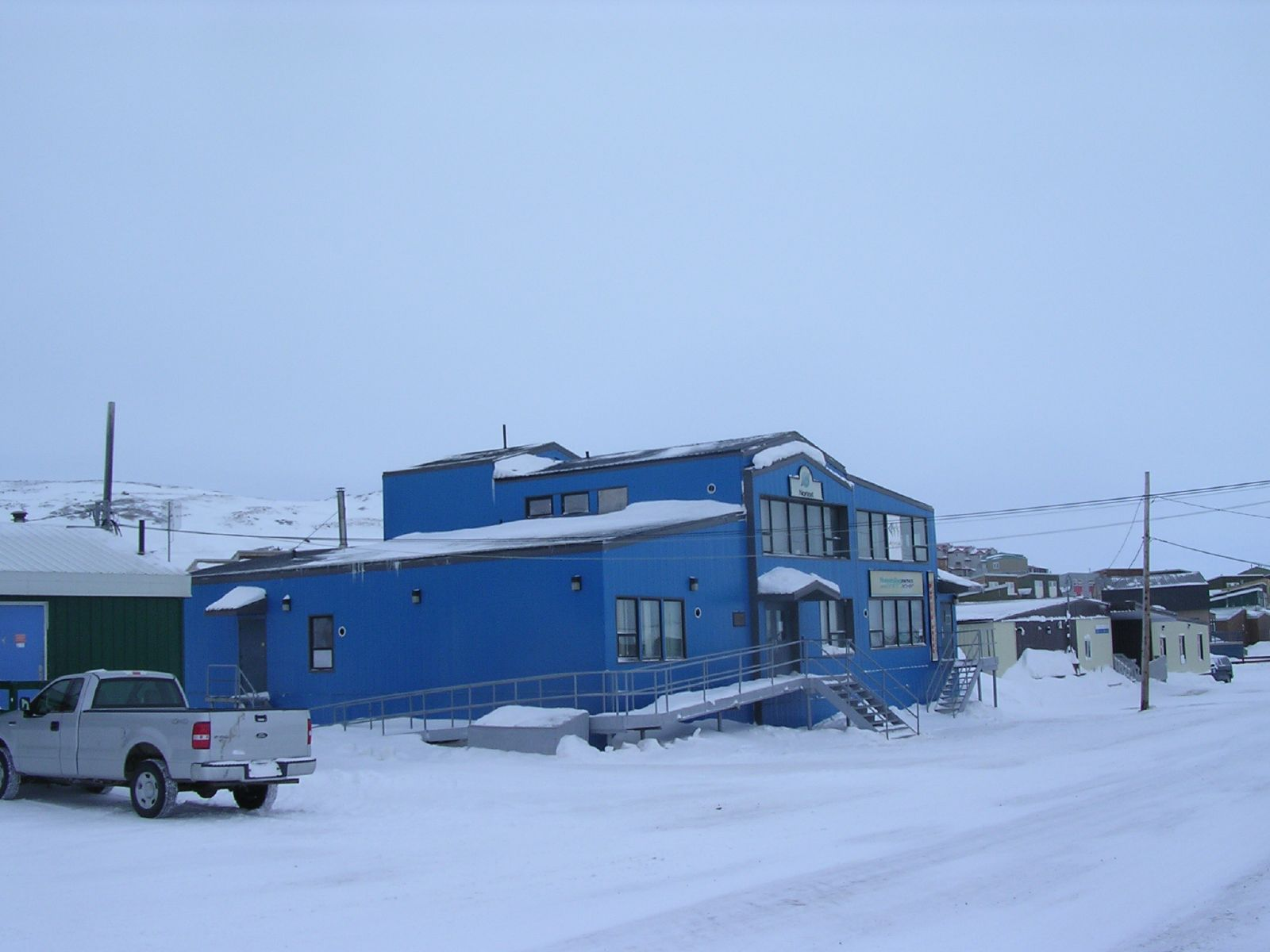
Headquarters in Iqaluit, Nunavut

Most content is produced in English and Inuktitut, with some French language content and the occasional article in Inuinnaqtun. Although circulation figures are not listed, the newspaper claimed to have the largest circulation in Nunavut and says they reach over 50,000 readers including website visitors. The current managing editor is Corey Larocque.

== See also ==
- List of newspapers in Canada
