= George H. Bush =

American lawyer and politician from New York (1857–1898)

Member of the New York State Assembly from the 3rd Ulster County district
- In office January 1, 1889 – December 31, 1892
- Preceded by: Charles H. Weidner
- Succeeded by: James Lounsbery

Personal details
- Born: February 18, 1857 Greenfield Park, New York
- Died: July 1, 1898 (aged 41) Ellenville, New York
- Party: Democratic
- Spouse: Lulu DuBois
- Education: Cornell University
- Occupation: Lawyer; politician

George H. Bush (February 18, 1857 – July 1, 1898) was an American lawyer and politician from New York.

== Life ==
Bush was born in Greenfield Park, New York on February 18, 1857. He was of Irish and German parentage.

Bush studied law at Cornell University and passed the state bar shortly after graduating. He served as Town Clerk of Wawarsing and Police Justice of Ellenville.

In 1888, Bush was elected to the New York State Assembly as a Democrat, representing the Ulster County 3rd District. He served in the Assembly in 1889, 1890, 1891, and 1892. In 1892, he was the Majority Leader and Chairman of the Ways and Means Committee.

Following the 1890 United States census and subsequent reapportionment, Ulster County lost one of its seats the assembly, going into the 1893 legislative session. This led Bush to contest the newly-drawn 2nd district seat in the November 1892 election. Bush's Republican opponent, James Lounsbery, was initially declared the victor, by a narrow margin of 21 votes out of more than 10,000 cast, and took office in January, but Bush challenged the results, alleging a conspiracy to illegally pay voters for their support of Lounsbery. On April 19, 1893, the assembly's Committee on Elections reported in favor of Bush, but Bush withdrew his claim, refusing to take office one day before the legislature's regular session was scheduled to conclude. The seating would have entitled him to receive the wages paid to the sitting members for the full session, but he stated that he "sought a vindication only and not compensation for services not rendered."

Bush was a delegate to the 1894 New York Constitutional Convention. A month before the Convention, he was appointed Building Commissioner for the Eastern New York Reformatory.

Bush's wife was Lulu DuBois. He died at home in Ellenville from gastrointestinal bleeding on July 1, 1898.

New York State Assembly
Preceded by Charles H. Weidner	New York State Assembly; Ulster County, 3rd District; 1889-1892	Succeeded by District Abolished
