= Port Ben station =

U.S. historic train station

Port Ben
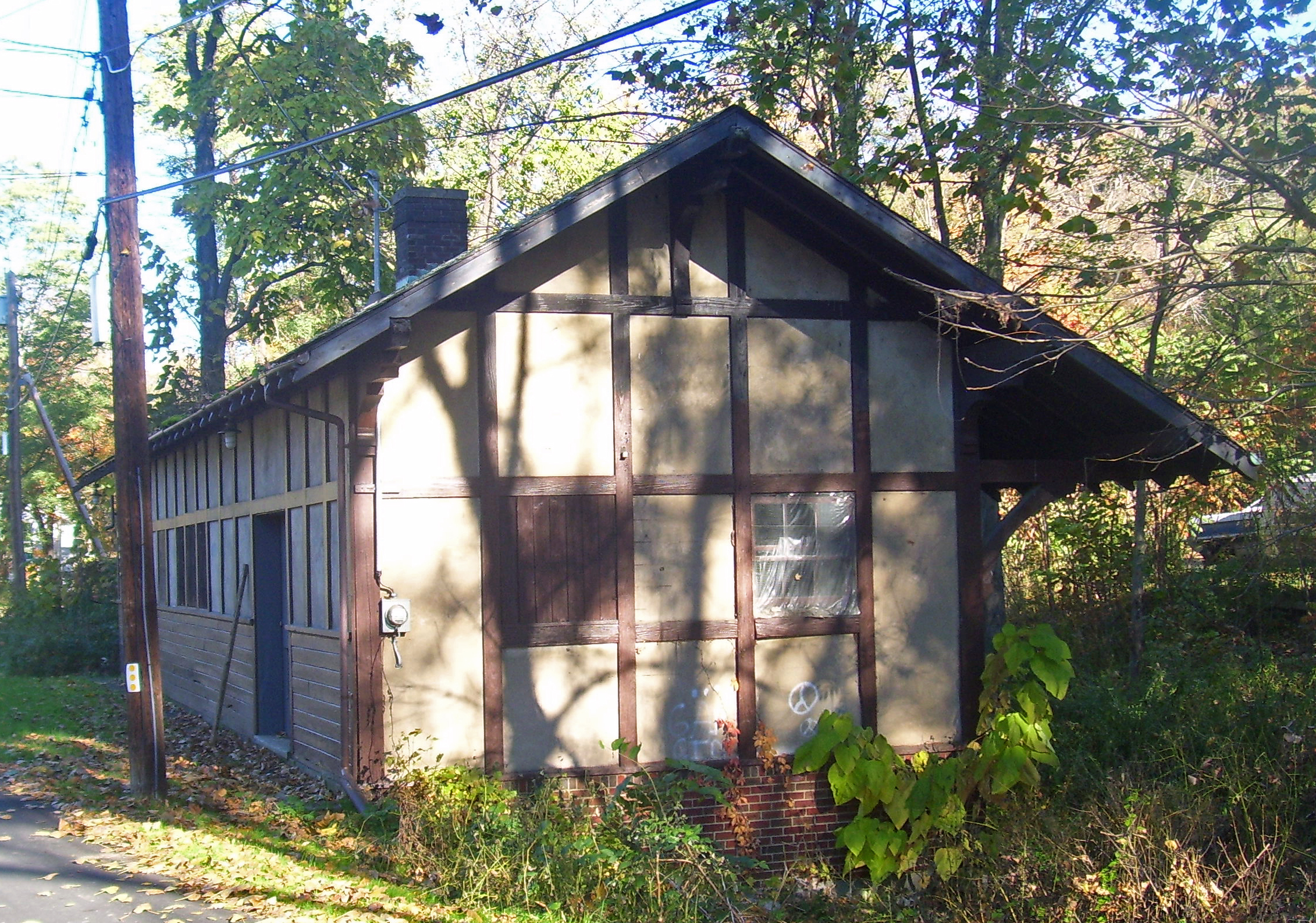
- North elevation and west profile, 2008

General information
- Location: 24 Towpath Road, Wawarsing, New York 14258

Former services
Preceding station	New York, Ontario and Western Railway	Following station
Wawarsing toward Summitville	Summitville – Kingston	Kerhonkson toward Kingston
- O&W Railroad Station at Port Ben
- U.S. National Register of Historic Places
- Location within New York Location within the United States
- Coordinates: 41°44′58.3″N 74°20′56.1″W
- Area: 13.5 acres (5.5 ha)
- Built: 1912
- Architectural style: Tudor Revival
- NRHP reference No.: 01001448
- Added to NRHP: January 11, 2002
Location

The abandoned NYO&W Port Ben station is located at 24 Towpath Road in the Town of Wawarsing, New York, United States. It is a Tudor Revival style building built during the early 20th century by the New York, Ontario and Western Railway (O&W). The station was on the O&W's division between Summitville on the O&W main line and Kingston.

Passenger service ended by 1946. Freight trains last operated in 1957 when the O&W was abandoned; the station ceased being used at that time. Despite its age and neglect, the Port Ben station remains intact and is well preserved. In 2000, the station and abandoned right-of-way were listed on the National Register of Historic Places.

== Building ==
The station is in the small community of Port Ben (known formerly as Port Benjamin), located a short distance east of the US 209 highway north of Napanoch, on the east bank of Rondout Creek at the base of the Shawangunk Ridge. It is on the northeast edge of Port Ben, a small community of small frame houses and modular and mobile homes. To the immediate east of the station is the empty bed of the Delaware and Hudson Canal, a National Historic Landmark.

Towpath Road on the west side of the station, which served that purpose during the canal's years of operation during the 19th century, was used later by the O&W. The 4,700 feet (1,400 m) of right-of-way remaining next to the station is still visible, and is included in the Register listing as a contributing resource, bringing the total area of the listing to 13.5 acres (5.5 ha).

The building itself is a single story, two-by-six-bay, wood frame building on a brick foundation with a low pitched gable roof shingled in slate. It is pierced by a brick chimney at the north end. Brackets support its wide overhanging eaves.

It is faced in half-timbered beige stucco on a metal lath. Some of the exterior has been defaced with spraypainted graffiti. Fenestration is irregular, determined by the building's use as a rail station. On the south side is an off-center projecting trainmaster's window and separate passenger and freight doors. The north has square windows in pairs and singled and a freight entrance near the west end. That end has two square windows, one currently boarded, matched by a passenger entrance and window at the east.

Inside, the space is divided into a passenger waiting area, ticket office and freight office. Many of the original finishings remain, including the lath and plaster walls, the varnished wainscoting and door and window surrounds. The electrical switches are still in place, and some coal remains in the bin.

== See also ==
- New York, Ontario and Western Railway
- National Register of Historic Places listings in Ulster County, New York
- Napanoch station, another surviving station on the same branch
