= George and John R. Hunt Memorial Building =

- George and John R. Hunt; Memorial Building
- U.S. National Register of Historic Places
- U.S. Historic district – Contributing property
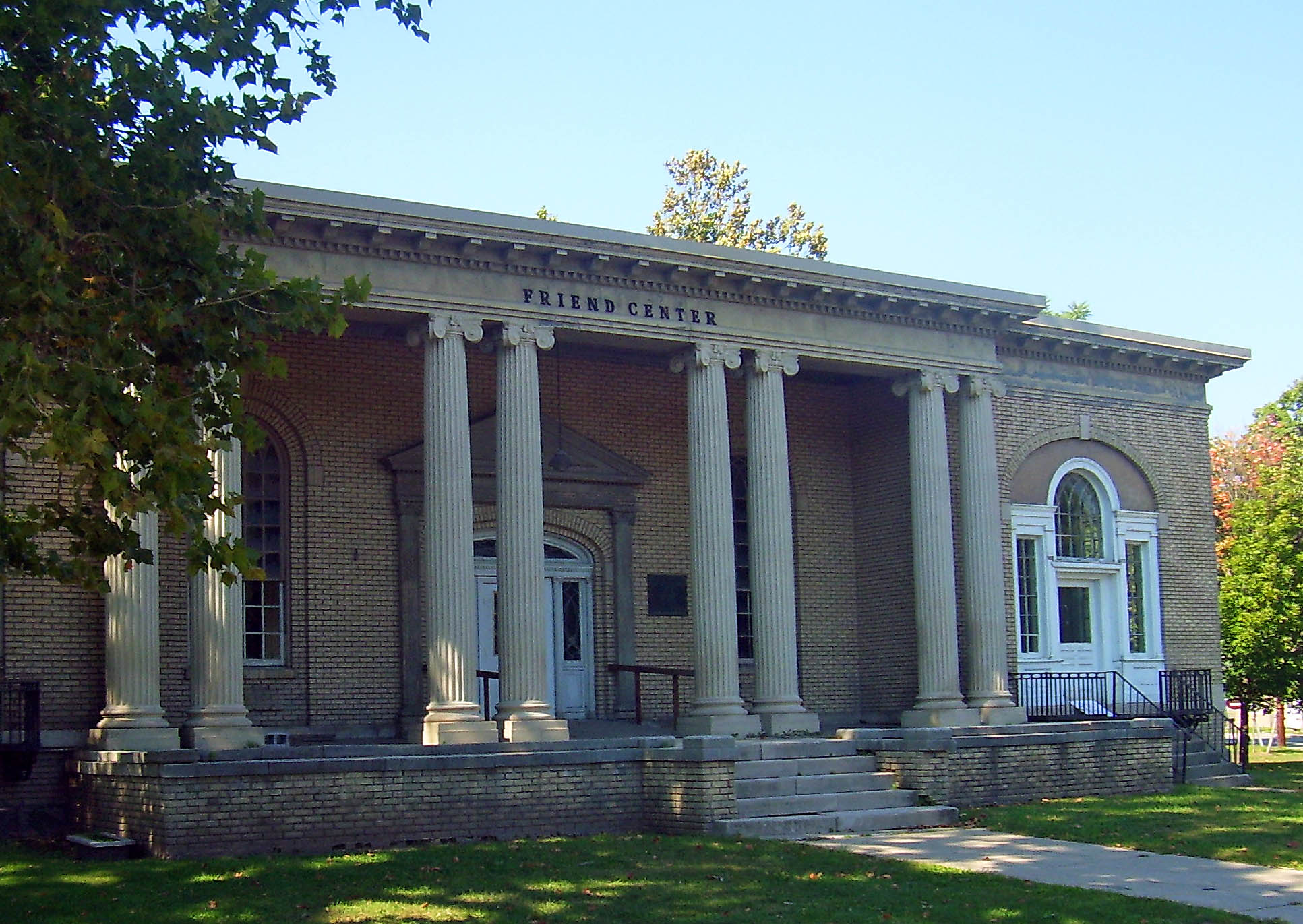
- The building in 2007

- Location within New York Location within the United States
- Location: Ellenville, NY
- Nearest city: Kingston
- Coordinates: 41°43′1″N 74°23′36″W
- Area: 9.9 acres (4.0 ha)
- Built: 1917
- Architect: Frank E. Estabrook
- Architectural style: Beaux Arts
- NRHP reference No.: 04001481
- Added to NRHP: January 14, 2005

The George and John R. Hunt Memorial Building, often referred to as just the Hunt Memorial Building, is the former Ellenville, New York, United States, public library. It is located on Liberty Square, at the juncture of Liberty Place and Canal Street (NY 52), just across from the village's post office, another Registered Historic Place in Wawarsing.

It was built in 1917 as local headquarters for the Women's Christian Temperance Union (WCTU), with money from local benefactor John R. Hunt. His intention was that the building, designed by Frank Estabrook of Newburgh mostly in neoclassical style, would serve as both rented private office space to provide the building with income, and a public community center.

Despite some decline in the condition of the building, it continued to serve as one of the three anchors of the village's downtown through the middle of the twentieth century, along with the post office and the since-burned Wayside Inn. To make ends meet, the WCTU had to rent out not only the office space but to go into the function hall business, using the public space. When the public library moved to its current quarters in 1975, the building was left without a major tenant, though over the next 15 years there was occupancy by The Ellenville News (a weekly community newspaper, for two years), TreSource and Fiber Industries (sustainable wood and forestry products), and the Plush Factory (stuffed toys); structural problems such as leaky roofs and badly built partitions accelerated its decay. Urban renewal efforts in Ellenville and the decline of the regional economy made the neighborhood less vibrant.

The last major tenant, in the 1990s, was an appliance retailer. Howard Hellman, who had taken over ownership of the building, decided to donate it to the village in the hopes that it could find a buyer who could attract a mix of tenants and revitalize not only the building but downtown. These efforts proved as futile for the village as they had for Hellman.

Local preservationists were interested in saving the building, however, and formed the Hunt Memorial Preservation Committee to raise funds and coordinate restoration efforts. The village has created a Historic Preservation Committee and taken other steps required by the state to coordinate rehabilitation efforts. Current plans call for a mix of public and private funds to be used to restore the masonry and repair the roof and windows. A stained glass skylight that had become severely deteriorated has been repaired, but is being kept in storage for safekeeping until the main room ceiling is fully renovated. In 2005 it was listed on the National Register of Historic Places, as well as on the State of New York registry. It is located in the Ellenville Downtown Historic District.

The ultimate intent is to restore the building to the point where it can serve its original purpose as a mixture of private and public space, providing a spur to the revival of downtown Ellenville. It remains in sporadic use, mostly as the venue for community events, such as the annual Run Like the Wind 10K race, the annual Blueberry/Huckleberry Festival, a summer series of concerts (Music in the Square), and art exhibits. After a local insurance agency vacated an office in the rear of the building, the space was renovated for use by the Ellenville/Wawarsing Chamber of Commerce, which completed its move of its office from its previous site on Berme Road in early 2008.

In 2015, Ulster County gave the village of Ellenville a million dollars for various local projects after it was passed over by the state as a casino site following a 2014 amendment to the state constitution that allowed casinos at several state locations. Of that money, $100,000 was allocated to restoring the Hunt Building. A little over one-third was used to shore up the main portico, while the rest went to refinishing the interior, although two rooms remain to be redone.

The Hunt Memorial Building Commission, which the village set up to operate the building, installed a new roof and redid the flooring and the windows. It also found some intact furniture from the former Nevele resort just south of the village and put it in the building. Some of the utilities have been upgraded as well.

In 2017, the village board announced it was seeking a $1.2 million state grant which, in conjunction with $150,000 already secured through state senator John Bonacic, will allow it to finish renovating the first floor. When completed, it will have a commercial-grade kitchen. The goal is for the space to be able to serve as a shelter for up to 30 residents during emergencies.

== See also ==
- National Register of Historic Places listings in Ulster County, New York
