= Gregan =

Gregan is a surname. Notable people with the surname include:

- Brian Gregan (born 1989), Irish sprinter
- Eugene Gregan (born 1937), American painter
- George Gregan (born 1973), Australian rugby union player
- John Edgar Gregan (1813–1855), Scottish architect
- Miroslav Gregáň (1996), Slovak footballer
- Sean Gregan (born 1974), English footballer

== See also ==
- Gregan McMahon (1874–1941), Australian actor and theatrical producer
- Grogan
