= Napanoch station =

Railway station near Napanoch, New York, U.S.

Napanoch
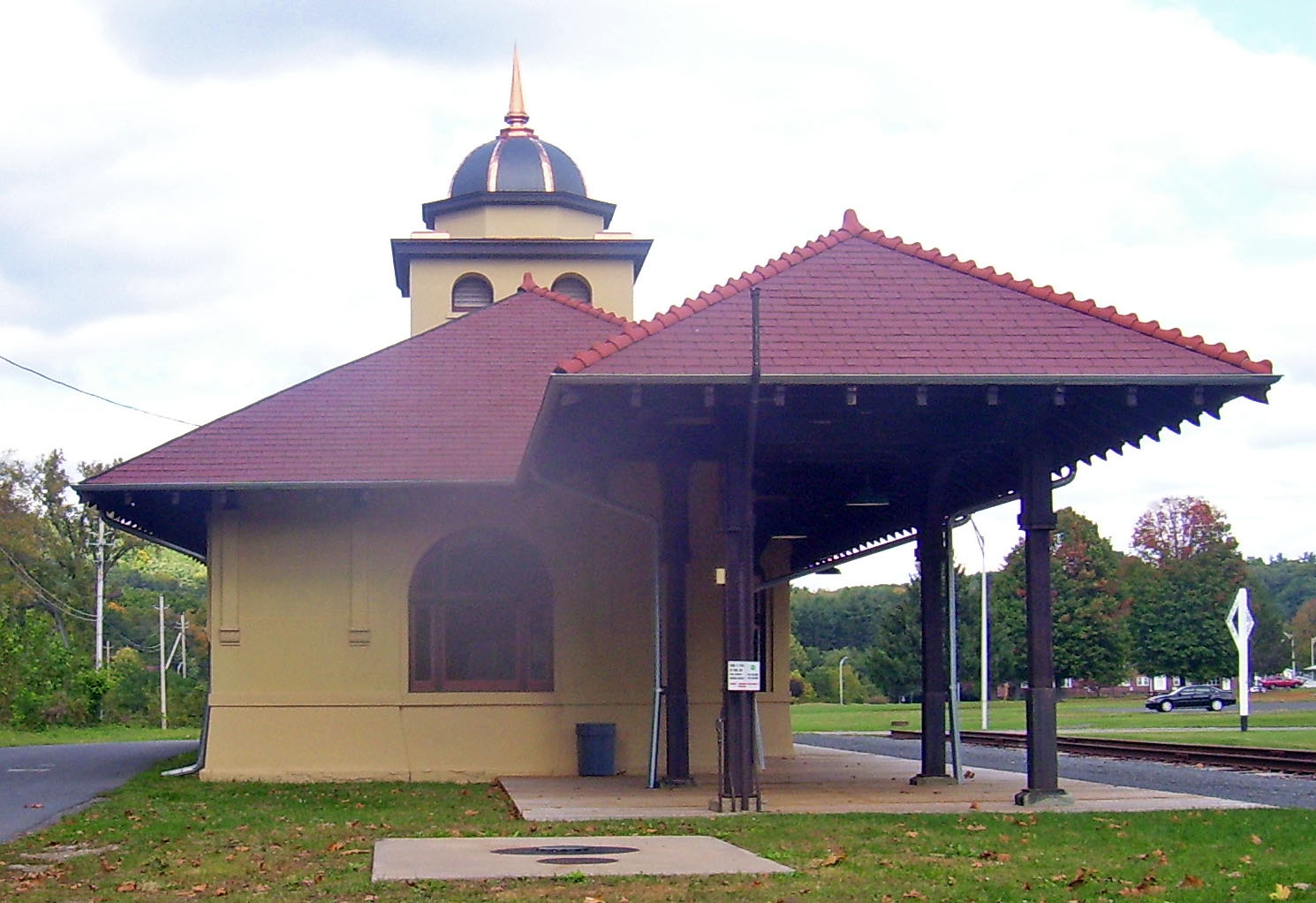
- Station building in 2007

General information
- Location: Dump Road, Napanoch, Ulster County, New York 12458

Former services
Preceding station	New York, Ontario and Western Railway	Following station
Ellenville toward Summitville	Summitville – Kingston	Wawarsing toward Kingston
- New York, Ontario, and Western Railroad Passenger Station
- U.S. National Register of Historic Places
- Location: Napanoch, New York
- Nearest city: Middletown
- Coordinates: 41°44′24″N 74°21′55″W
- Built: 1903
- Architect: Jackson, Rosencrans & Canfield
- Architectural style: Classical Revival
- NRHP reference No.: 99000086
- Added to NRHP: 1999
Location

The New York, Ontario, and Western Railroad Passenger Station is located on Institution Road, between Eastern Correctional Facility and Rondout Creek, near Napanoch, New York, United States.

== History ==
It was built by the New York, Ontario and Western Railway (O&W) in 1903 for the dual purpose of bringing tourists to Napanoch and inmates to the newly established prison. A branch from Ellenville to Kerhonkson was opened in 1902, following the recently abandoned Delaware and Hudson Canal, a portion of which survives just west of the station building. A temporary station at the present site served passengers while the New York City firm of Jackson, Rosencrans & Canfield designed and built a permanent station in a Classical Revival style.

O&W passenger service ended in September 1953, and the original domed roof had deteriorated to the point that it was replaced with the current tiled version. Trackage was dismantled in 1958, the year after the O&W was liquidated.

== Preservation ==
The station became the property of the state Department of Correctional Services, which owned the surrounding land as part of the prison property.

It was later renovated and reopened as a museum devoted to its past and the O&W. A small section of track was restored, with several railroad artifacts on display.
