= Ulster Heights Synagogue =

Synagogue in Wawarsing, New York, USA

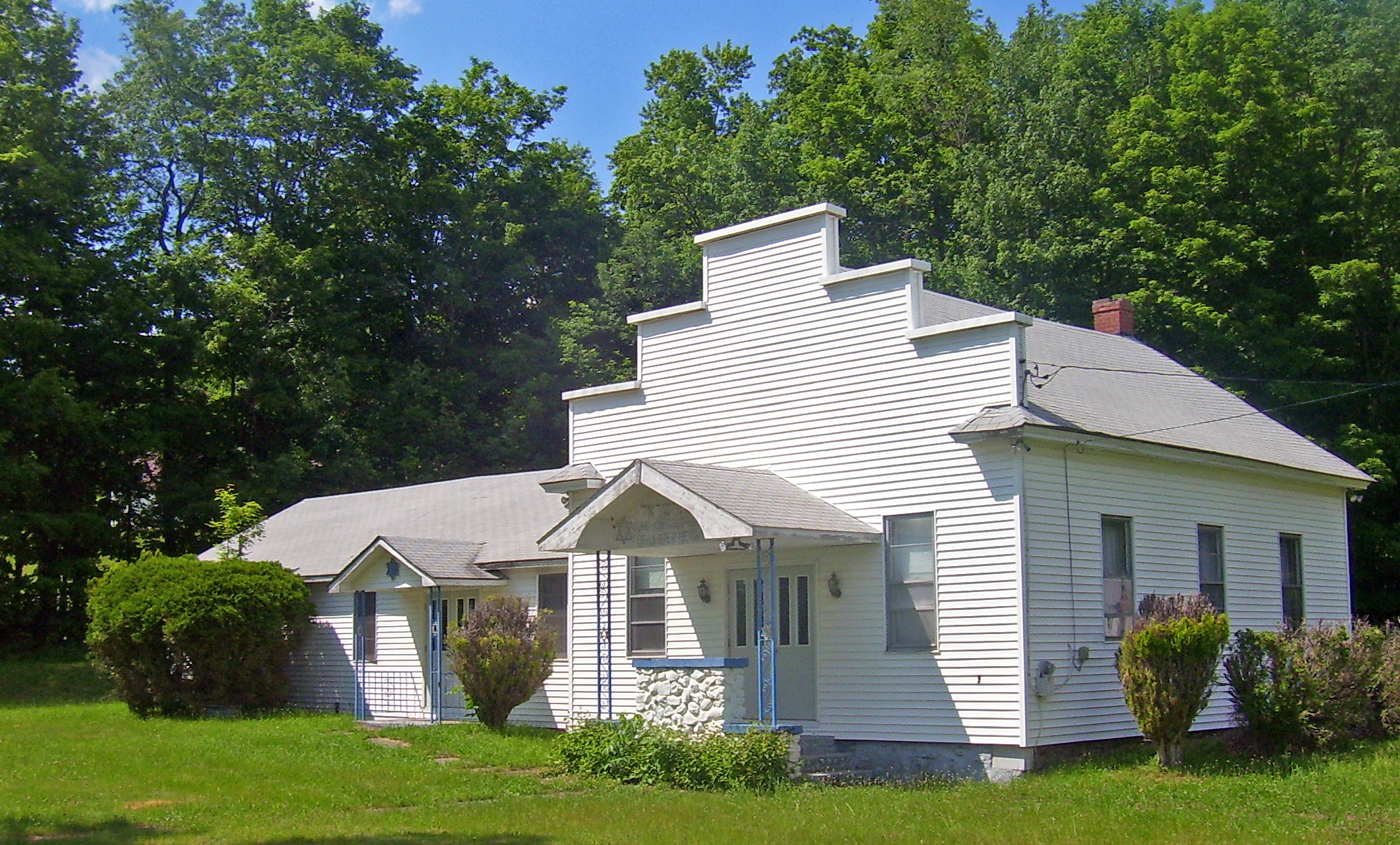
- Front (south) elevation and east profile of building, 2008

- Location in New York

Religion
- Affiliation: Judaism
- Ecclesiastical or organizational status: Synagogue
- Status: Active

Location
- Location: Ulster Heights, Catskill region, New York
- Country: United States
- Interactive map of Ulster Heights Synagogue
- Coordinates: 41°46′49″N 74°31′03″W

Architecture
- Established: c. 1908 (as a congregation)
- Completed: 1924

Specifications
- Direction of façade: South
- Materials: Wood

Website
- ckisrael.com
- Ulster Heights Synagogue
- U.S. National Register of Historic Places
- Area: less than one acre
- NRHP reference No.: 01000045
- Added to NRHP: February 19, 2001

Ulster Heights Synagogue, formally known as Congregation Knesset Israel of Ulster Heights, is a Jewish congregation and synagogue, located at the corner of Beaver Dam and Ulster Heights roads in the Ulster Heights section of the town of Wawarsing, in the Catskill region of New York, in the United States.

The congregation was formed in the early 1900s and the synagogue building was built in 1924 by the early Jewish American settlers of the southeastern Catskill region. In 2001 the synagogue building was added to the National Register of Historic Places as a relatively intact example of a vernacular rural synagogue typical of the region. Since its construction the building has been renovated and added to but it is still true to its original form. Over the years the original population of the area has dwindled and it has fewer members than it did in the early years. It has not held services on the High Holy Days in recent years.

== Building ==
The synagogue is a one-story three-by-three-bay structure, with a newer wing to the west, sided in white vinyl, which replaced the original clapboard. It was built of wood frame with a fieldstone and mortar foundation. The roof is gabled and shingled in asphalt. On three sides the roof has a deep cornice with returns; the front gable is parapeted.

A single brick chimney comes up through the rear. The front entrance has a slightly raised portico

The interior consists of a small vestibule leading into the auditorium, where the ark is on the rear and pews surround the bimah on three sides. A wide hallway leads into the new wing, used as a community center.

Originally the synagogue's interior was very plain. Some decorative touches such as a chandelier in the auditorium and a wrought-iron railing around the bimah, have been added since its construction.

== History ==
Jews from Eastern Europe began settling in the Catskills starting in 1900. The area of Ulster and Sullivan counties due west of Ellenville and Kerhonkson became a popular destination. One of these areas was Ulster Heights, in the western highlands of the Town of Wawarsing, near the Sullivan County line.

The Jews who settled here and managed to make a living dairy and poultry farming the difficult, rocky soil were unusual in that they continued as a farming community, instead of gradually becoming a resort area like many other Jewish enclaves in the region. They held prayer services in their homes at first, gradually settling on Samuel Tannenbaum's hotel/boarding house as more families arrived.

From 1908 on the group had wanted to build its own meeting place, but only in 1922 had it raised enough money to purchase the land. A foundation was built shortly afterwards, but the lumber turned out to be rotten and the group soon had just an empty hole. Samuel Kaufman, a lawyer who vacationed nearby, decided to help raise money and by the end of that summer had secured enough from resort owners for the congregation to start building again. Ulster Heights Synagogue was formally opened with Passover services in 1924.

It would remain the focal point of the small community for the next two decades. As the children of the early settlers began moving elsewhere in the years after World War II, it declined until a young couple, Morris and Celia Rudin, led an effort that not only reversed that trend but renovated the building, adding its ark, chandelier and other interior decor, and building the portico new wing and residing the structure. Many of these changes had the effect of making Ulster Heights more like the other rural synagogues in the area.

At the end of the 20th century, the congregation still had around 30 members, mainly descendants of the original founding families. It has not held services on the High Holy Days in recent years.

The small cemetery for the synagogue is on Briggs Highway about 3.5 miles away.
