= Spring Glen Synagogue =

Synagogue in Wawarsing, New York

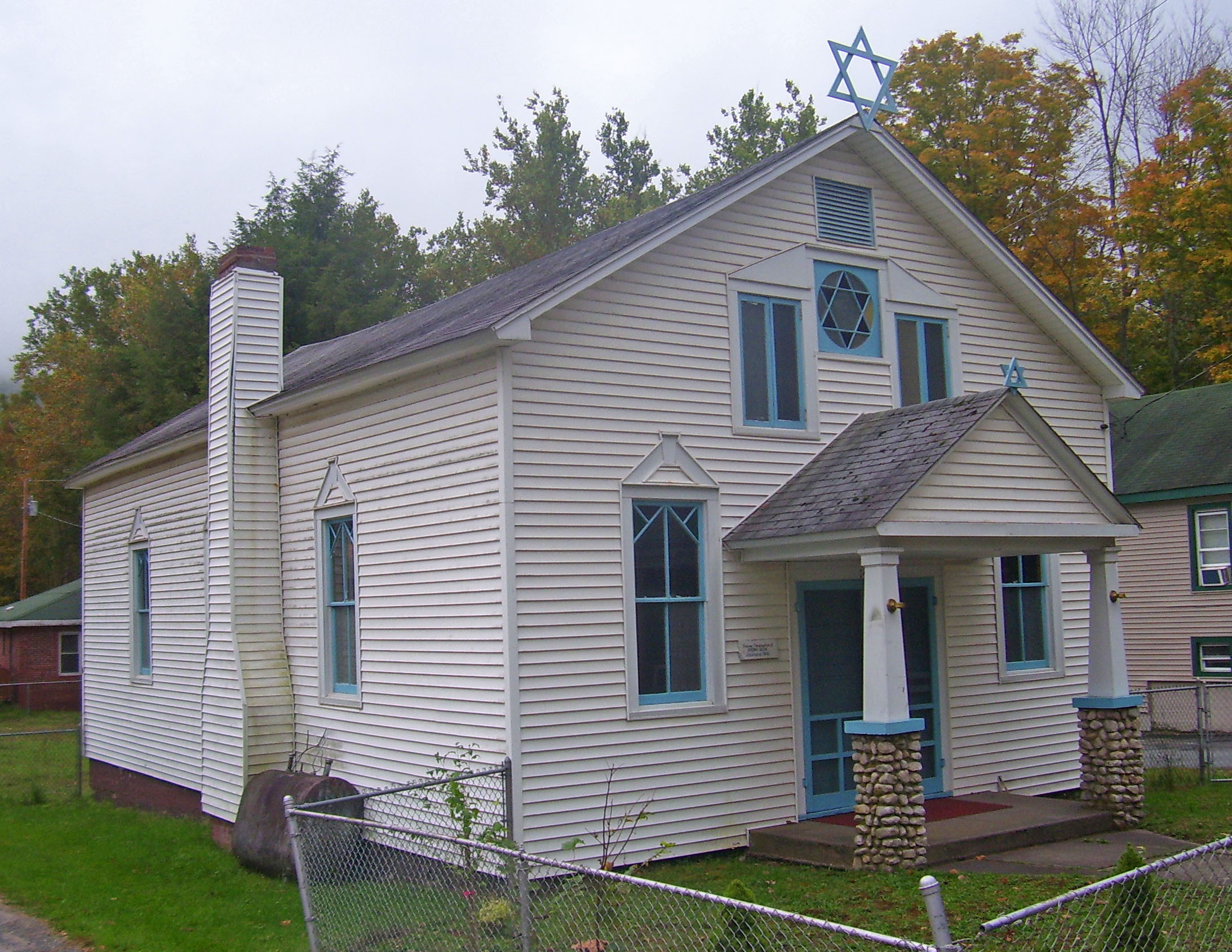
- Front (west) elevation and north profile, 2007

- Location in New York

Religion
- Affiliation: Judaism
- Ecclesiastical or organisational status: Synagogue
- Status: Active

Location
- Location: Old Route 209, Spring Glen, Wawarsing, New York 12428
- Country: United States
- Coordinates: 41°39′58″N 74°25′45″W

Architecture
- Established: 1908 (as a congregation)
- Completed: 1918

Specifications
- Direction of façade: West
- Materials: Wood, aluminum
- Spring Glen Synagogue
- U.S. National Register of Historic Places
- Area: less than one acre
- NRHP reference No.: 98001622
- Added to NRHP: January 15, 1999

The Spring Glen Synagogue is a Jewish congregation and synagogue, located along Old U.S. Route 209 in the hamlet of Spring Glen, part of the Town of Wawarsing in Ulster County, New York, in the United States. It was one of the first established in a Jewish American community in the Catskill region, and is still in use today.

== History ==
Sam Meyerson, the region's first Jewish resident, bought land in the area shortly after 1900. His neighbors, all Christians of various Protestant denominations, decided to accept and befriend him after conferring about the matter among themselves. Other Jewish families followed, and a congregation was formally established in 1908.

The congregation had been meeting at Spring Glen's Episcopal church. By the early 1910s, with more Jewish families buying summer homes in or near Spring Glen, members realized they needed a place of worship of their own. In July 1916, the Torah scrolls were dedicated. Two local Gentiles, stationmaster Wells C. Smith and postmaster John Thornton, presented the congregation with a Bible they had purchased. Throughout most of 1917, a small white clapboard bungalow with blue trim house in the middle of the hamlet, festooned with wooden Stars of David, in the center of the hamlet, was under construction, finished in 1918.

In 1920 the congregation formally incorporated. The synagogue was open every morning and afternoon for prayers, and congregants helped sustain it through the off-season by holding their weddings, bar mitzvahs, Yom Tovs and other ceremonies there.

No significant changes have been made to the building since its construction other than the addition of discreet aluminum siding and bathrooms, during the 1960s. It was added to the National Register of Historic Places in 1999.

== See also ==
- National Register of Historic Places listings in Ulster County, New York
