= Ellenville Downtown Historic District =

Historic district in New York, United States

- U.S. National Register of Historic Places
- U.S. Historic district
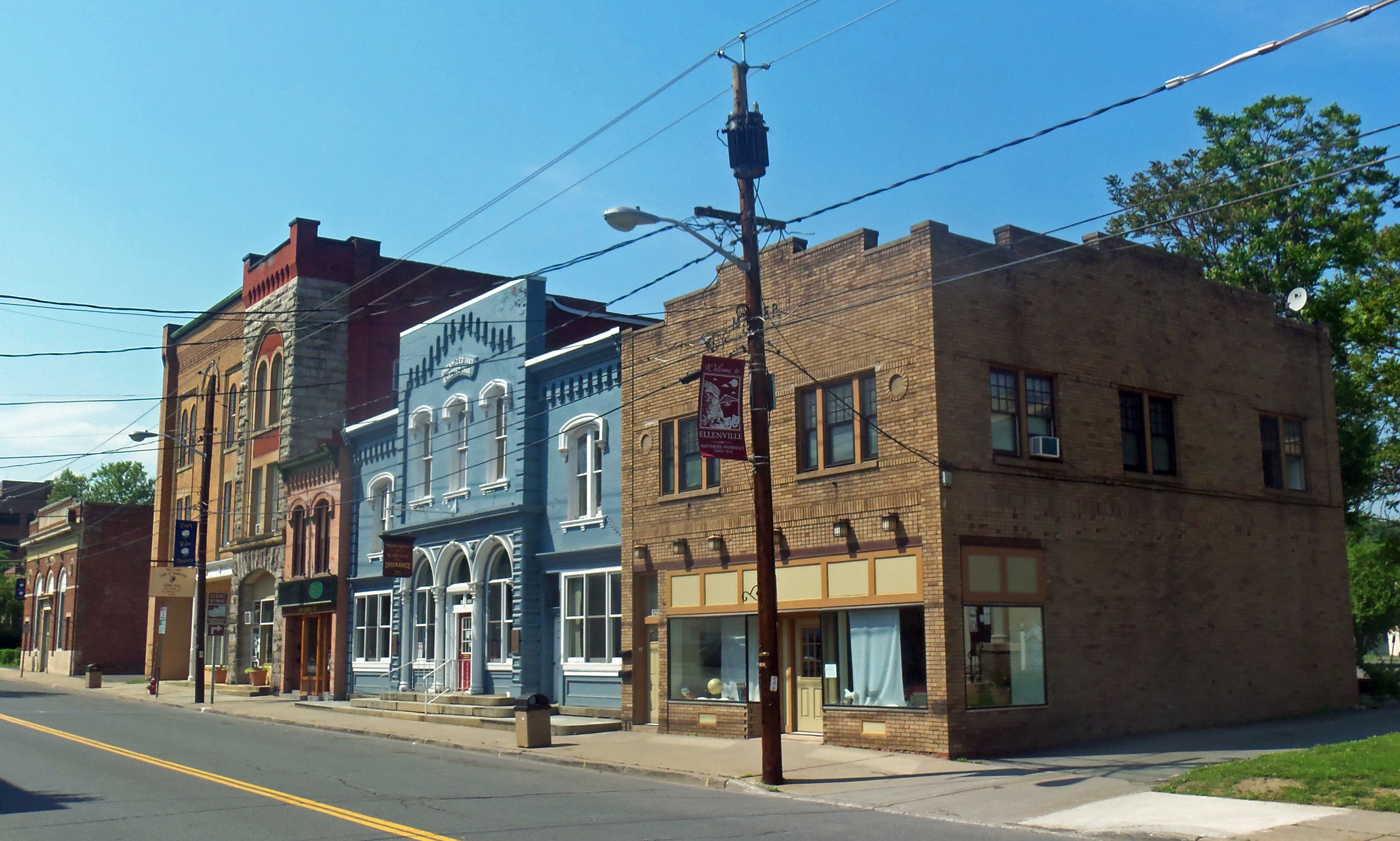
- Buildings on Canal Street, Ellenville, NY, May 2012

- Location within New York Location within the United States
- Interactive map showing the location of Ellenville Downtown Historic District
- Location: Canal, Center, Liberty, Main, & Market Sts., Ellenville, New York
- Coordinates: 41°43′01″N 74°23′36″W
- Area: 13 acres (5.3 ha)
- Built: c. 1823-1958
- Architectural style: Late Victorian, Late 19th and 20th century revivals, Modern Movement
- NRHP reference No.: 12000344
- Added to NRHP: June 20, 2012

Ellenville Downtown Historic District is a national historic district located at Ellenville, Ulster County, New York. It encompasses 52 contributing buildings and 3 contributing sites in the central business district of Ellenville. It developed after 1823, with the construction of the Delaware and Hudson Canal, and includes notable examples of Greek Revival, Italianate, Late Victorian, and Art Deco architecture. Located in the district are the separately listed Christ Lutheran Church and Parsonage, George and John R. Hunt Memorial Building, and United States Post Office. Other notable contributing resources include the Ellenville United Methodist Church (1858), First National Bank Building (1868), Wawarsing Town Hall (1895), Norbury Hall, Scoresby Hook and Ladder, Cohen's Bakery, Ellenville Electric Co. Building (1914), Home National Bank (1928), H. Rosenstock and Sons clothing factory (c. 1920), the Miller Building (c. 1940), and the Village Motel (c. 1955).

It was listed on the National Register of Historic Places in 2012.
