= Christ Lutheran Church (Ellenville, New York) =

Historic church in New York, United States

- Christ Lutheran Church and Parsonage
- U.S. National Register of Historic Places
- U.S. Historic district – Contributing property
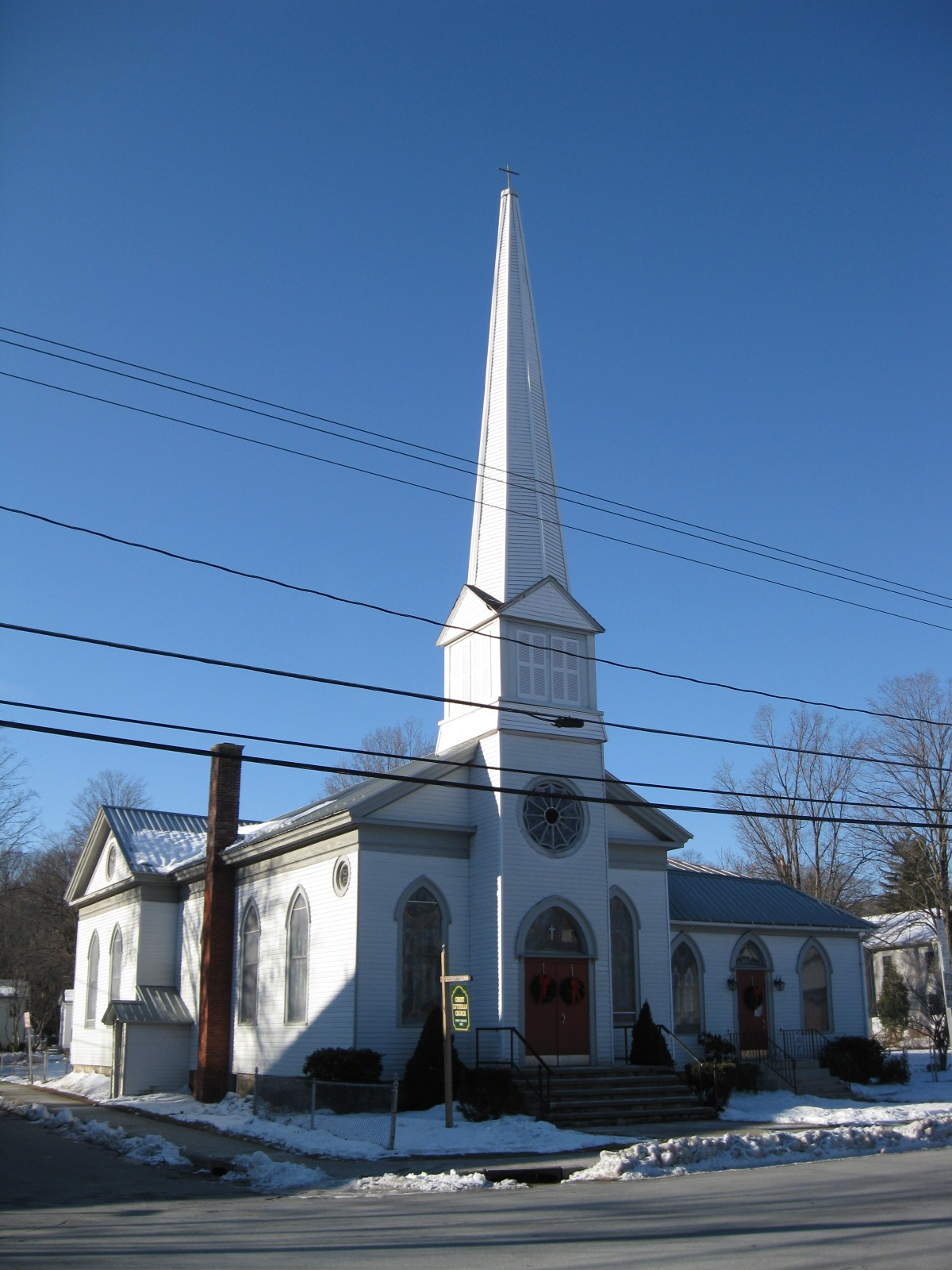
- Christ Lutheran Church, December 2009

- Location within New York Location within the United States
- Location: 105-107 Center Street, Ellenville, New York
- Coordinates: 41°42′53.68″N 74°23′34.06″W
- Area: 0.9 acres (0.36 ha)
- Built: 1862
- Architectural style: Gothic Revival, Greek Revival
- NRHP reference No.: 10000304
- Added to NRHP: May 28, 2010

Christ Lutheran Church and Parsonage, originally the German Evangelical Lutheran Church of Ellenville, is a historic Lutheran church and parsonage located at Ellenville, Ulster County, New York. The church was built in 1862 in the Greek Revival style. It was moved, enlarged, reoriented, and completely remodeled in 1903–1904 in the Gothic Revival style when moved to its present location. It is a roughly L-shaped building, with a T-shaped main block consisting of a 1 1/2-story, gable-roofed front block and 1 1/2-story gable-roofed rear block. Appended to it is a 1-story addition. It features a two-tiered, square bell tower, central front entrance flanked by blind bays, and Gothic arched stained glass windows. The parsonage is a 2-story, three-bay-wide, Greek Revival–style brick dwelling built about 1850.

It was listed on the National Register of Historic Places in 2010. It is located in the Ellenville Downtown Historic District.
