= Spring Glen, New York =

Spring Glen
- Hamlet
- Location within the state of New York
- Coordinates: 41°39′57″N 74°25′48″W
- Country: United States
- State: New York
- County: Ulster
- Elevation: 400 ft (120 m)
- Time zone: UTC-5 (Eastern (EST))
  - Summer (DST): UTC-4 (EDT)

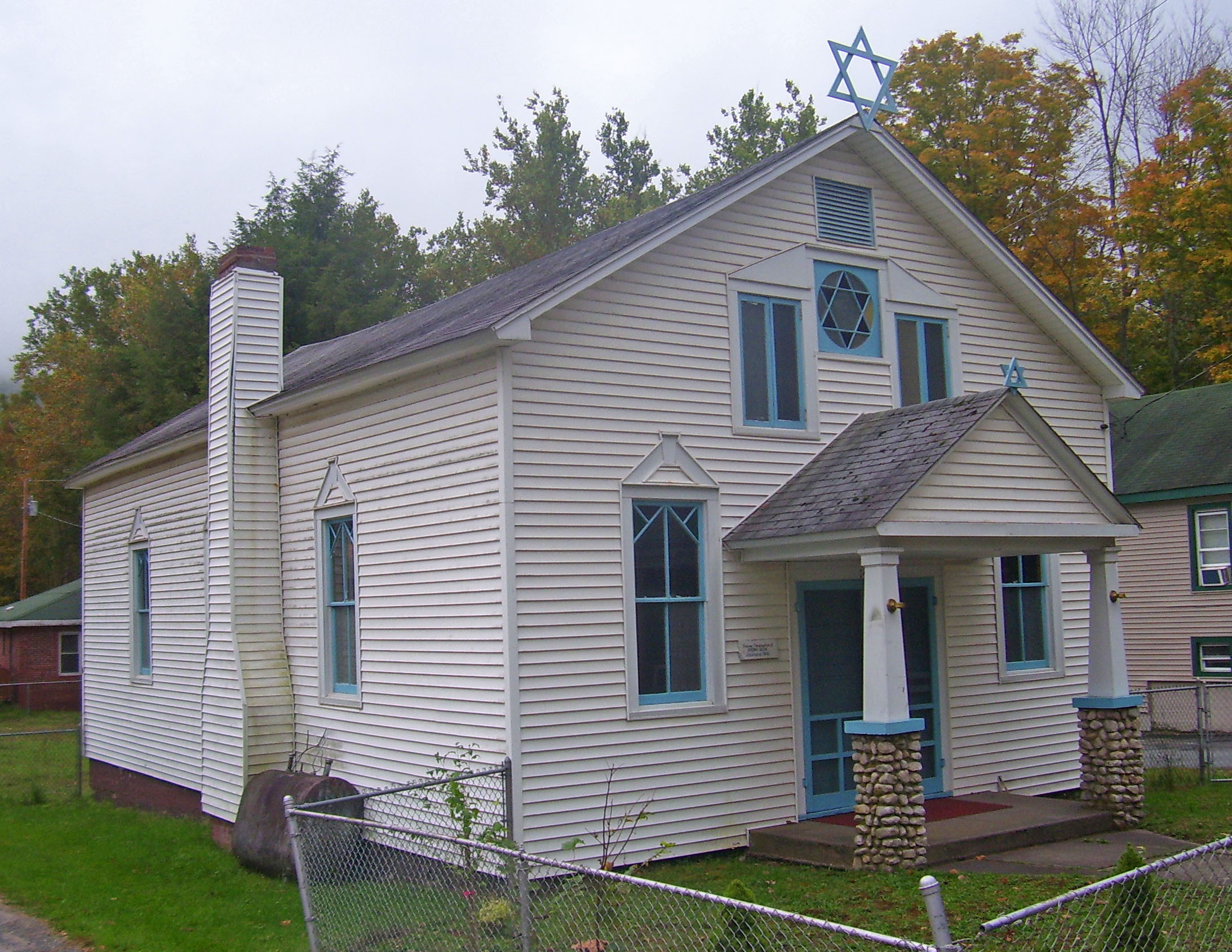
Spring Glen Synagogue, the first Jewish place of worship in the Catskills.

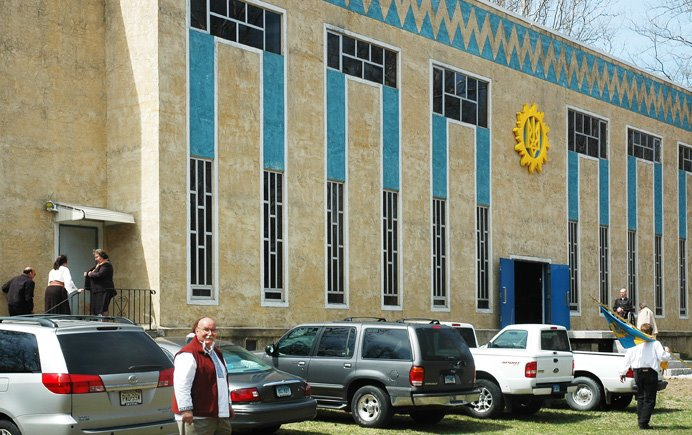
Neogapan Ukrainian temple of Oriyana in Spring Glen

Spring Glen is a hamlet of the Town of Wawarsing in Ulster County, New York, United States. It is located just off US 209 just north of the Sullivan County line. It sits along the Sandburg Creek and has a direct access point for parking and hiking to the highest point of the Shawangunk Ridge Trail at over 1800 feet. It has the ZIP Code 12483.

== History ==
It has been settled since the early 19th century, first as a farming village. Later, the Delaware and Hudson Canal made it a key stop. Spring Glen is its third name. Originally established as Red Bank, it became Homowack (Iroquois for "where the stream begins") in 1851. Later in the century, the residents changed the name again, this time to Spring Glen, to attract more tourist business.

That tourism brought Jews to the region, coined the Borscht Belt and in 1917 they built Spring Glen Synagogue, the first Jewish place of worship in the Catskill region. The community became a concentration of 5 hotels and over 30 vacation rental bungalow properties, most of which occupied only during the summer months. Many of the bungalow colonies became co-ops in the 1960s and 1970s when tourism to the Catskills declined due to the growth of cheap air travel to international destinations. Most bungalows passed ownership between families, yet in the past decade, there has been an explosion in popularity of bungalows amongst New York City dwellers as second homes, many have been sold to new owners, while most communities have wait lists . Since 2012 there has been a solid cult following by the blogger community, young families and hipsters alike about bungalow colonies and rehabilitating cooperative living in the country.

As of 2015, Ulster & Sullivan counties began changing zoning code so that new bungalows and bungalow colonies could no longer be built. Thus, current bungalow colonies are the last of their kind.

== Development ==
Spring Glen Resort - The Beautiful Earth Group, which now owns the old Homowack properties in Spring Glen, has plans to develop a family-oriented and environmentally sensitive resort, powered with the renewable energy sources the New York-based company is known for promoting and building nationwide.

A sports oriented family resort and sports camp facility is planned for the site of the Nevele, just outside Spring Glen.

== Houses of worship ==
Temple of Oriyana - a holy place for followers of the religion of RUNVira which houses one of the Ukrainian relics.

Spring Glen Synagogue - the first Jewish place of worship in the Catskill region. It still holds Orthodox services on High Holy Days, though any denomination is welcome.

== See also ==
- Kiryas Square
- New Square
