= Hoornbeek Store Complex =

- U.S. National Register of Historic Places
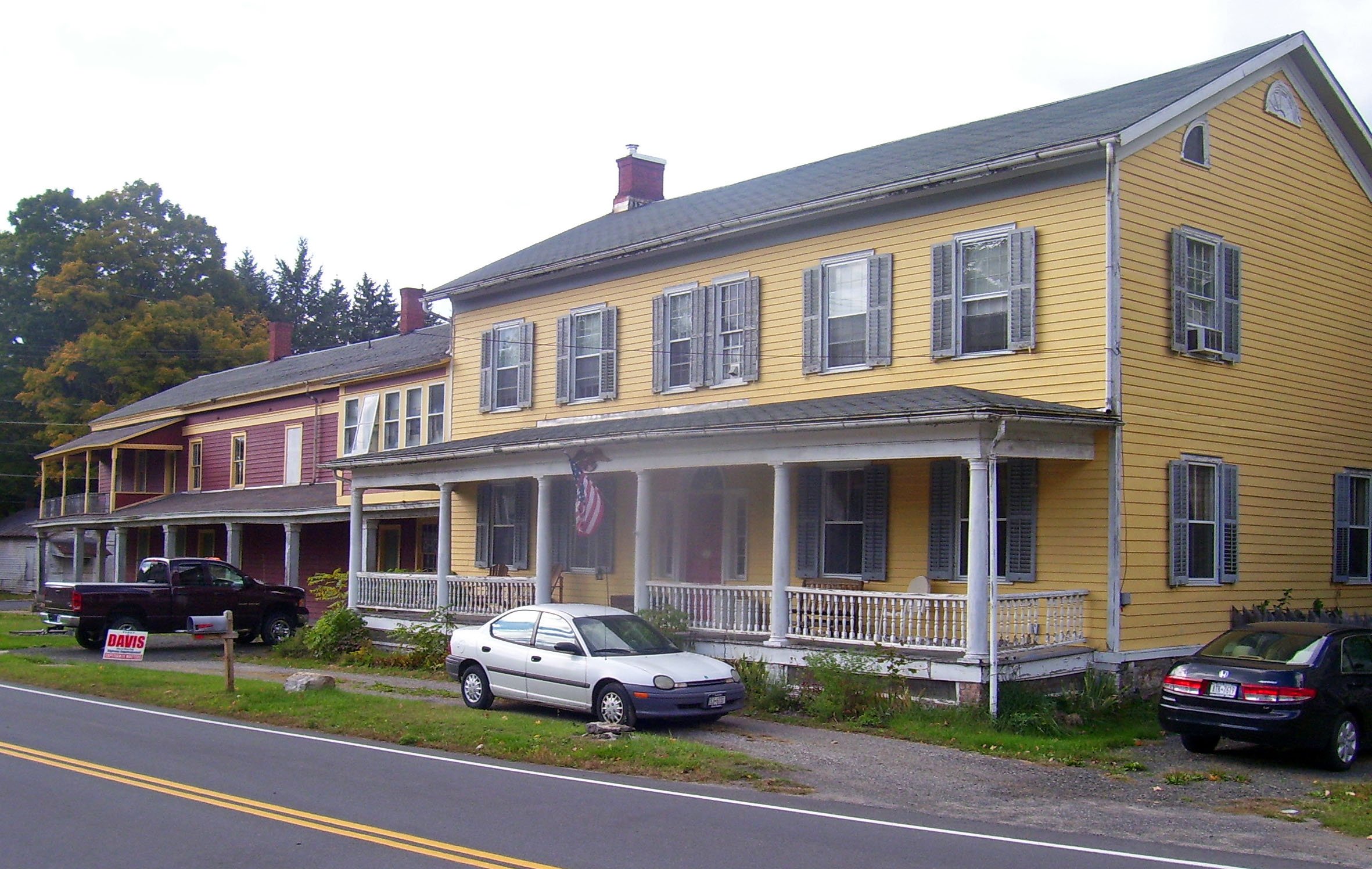
- Store (left) and William Doll House, 2007
- Location: Napanoch, NY
- Nearest city: Kingston
- Coordinates: 41°44′29″N 74°22′26″W
- Area: 1 acre (0.40 ha)
- Built: 1810; 1833; 1841
- Architectural style: Federal, Greek Revival
- NRHP reference No.: 84003229
- Added to NRHP: February 9, 1984

The Hoornbeek Store Complex is a Registered Historic Place in the hamlet of Napanoch, New York, United States. It consists of several buildings located on a one-acre (0.4 ha) parcel on Main Street between Clinton and Church streets. They reflect Napanoch's transition from its original settlement into the Delaware and Hudson Canal era and the move from Federal style to Greek Revival as the dominant style in American architecture.

== Buildings ==
There are three main buildings in the complex, erected over a 30-year period. The oldest is the William Doll House, built around 1810 in the Federal style house by a local physician and his family. It boasts five bays and an unusual eight-panel door. The interior features some of the original fabrics, as well as later renovations, such as the staircase, that reflect Greek Revival fashions. It remains in use today as a private home.

In 1833, the Hoornbeek Store was constructed to the south by Richard and George Southwick. They had been buying land in the area to take advantage of business from through traffic on the canal, which had opened five years earlier to carry coal from Northeastern Pennsylvania to Kingston, where it could be loaded on boats traveling down the Hudson River for New York City. Its Greek Revival features include the front porch with five heavy pillars, massive cornice, and tall frieze. Four years after it was opened, it was connected to the Doll House via a small addition when Doll bought out the Southwicks during foreclosure proceedings. Later owners in the 20th century added the second-story porches. Today it is vacant.

The last main structure, the Napanoch Female Seminary, was built in 1841 by Gabriel Ludlum, who had leased the store from Doll. It is a simple two-story clapboard frame house, with unusual window locations due to its original use as a girls' school, with the schoolmaster's quarters on the ground floor and students housed upstairs. At one point, it, too, was connected to the store, probably in 1856 when Ludlum bought out Doll and became the sole owner of the complex. That connection was demolished in the 20th century.

Scattered around the property are several outbuildings. These fulfilled service functions for customers and residents, such as an ice house, stables, wagon, and feed shed.

== History ==
Ludlum leased the store and house to John Decker and Eli DuBois, who operated the former as a combination of shops and tavern and the latter as a hotel. In 1864, they bought the property from him, refurbished it, and then sold the house and store to the Hoornbeek family in 1867. It would remain in their hands for over a century, giving it its popular local name.

Calvin Hoornbeek operated the complex as a combination of shops and apartments and willed it to his son L.D.B. when he died in 1890. He continued the business, living in the house and running the store, and in 1925 became the first person since Ludlum to own the whole complex when he bought the seminary building, which had passed through several owners since then. He rented it out as a single-family residence and continued to operate the store until his death in 1940. Various sons and daughters continued to live there until the last died in 1975. A subsequent owner, Amy Plummer Hoffman, got the property listed on the New York State and National Registers of Historic Places in the early 1980s.
