= Greenfield Park, New York =

- Hamlet
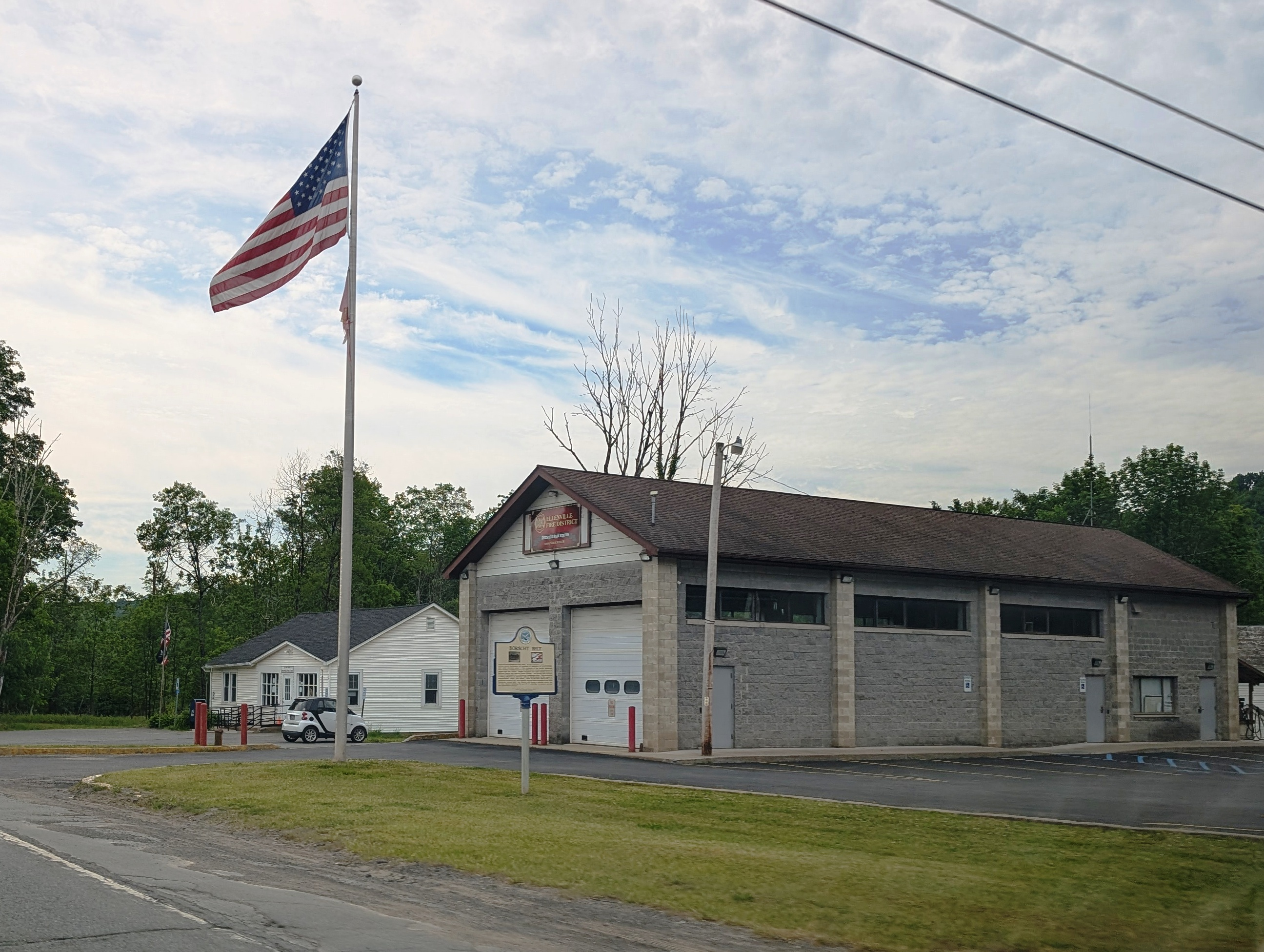
- Fire department and post office

- Location within New York Location within the United States
- Coordinates: 41°43′33″N 74°29′09″W
- Country: United States
- State: New York
- County: Ulster
- Elevation: 873 ft (266 m)
- Time zone: UTC-5 (Eastern (EST))
  - Summer (DST): UTC-4 (EDT)
- ZIP code: 12435
- Area code: 845
- GNIS feature ID: 951747

Greenfield Park is a hamlet in the Town of Wawarsing, Ulster County, New York, United States. The community is located along New York State Route 52, 4.7 miles (7.6 km) west of Ellenville. Greenfield Park has a post office with ZIP code 12435, which opened on December 23, 1852.

It is home to many bungalow colonies which are summer homes for mostly Jewish families who escape the summer heat in Brooklyn, including Tamarack Hills, Greenfield Meadows, and Dee Lees.

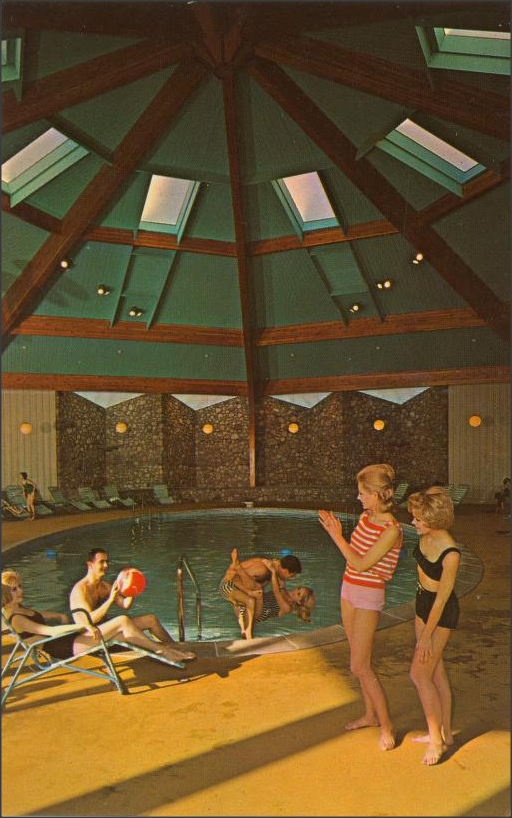
Indoor swimming pool at Tamarack Lodge in Greenfield Park
