= Greenfield Park One Room Schoolhouse =

Historic schoolhouse in New York, United States

The Greenfield Park One Room Schoolhouse is located in the town of Wawarsing in Ulster County, New York, United States. This one-room schoolhouse was built in 1830 and was home to grades one through eight. It was operated by one teacher and one school trustee. Its former students restored it to its present condition after forming the "Greenfield Park Historical Association" in 1960.

It became a museum on June 27, 1965 and named the "Greenfield Park Museum" or "Greenfield Park One Room Schoolhouse Museum". Many pieces of the memorabilia contained in the schoolhouse are original. The building is about 30 feet wide by 45 feet long. It has a large Pot bellied stove for heat, but has no electricity or water. The original two student desks with fold down seats are there, as well as ink wells and slate blackboard. There are small two-seater outhouses (boys and girls separate) on the outside, for girls on the left side and for boys on the right side of the building. Among the preserved memorabilia is a teacher’s contract of a $5 a week salary, plus 3 weeks paid vacation in the summer if the trustee felt like it. The names of all the teachers over the years were tabulated on a wall roster.

The schoolhouse is located on Oak Ridge Road, right off New York Route 52, in the center of its Greenfield-Park stretch in the Catskill Mountains.

== History ==
The date given when this building was erected is 1830, and records indicate that this schoolhouse was already in use prior to 1836. In those days, as throughout rural America, the school district for this community, known then as Greenfield, included this one room schoolhouse for all eight elementary grades, with one school trustee and one teacher.

All the children of the community attended the one room school. Their number varied yearly but often there were more than 35 attending school. They ranged from the tiny tot, just entering first grade, to the teenager who had advanced to the eighth grade, all taught by the same teacher.

School taxes as late as 1893 ranged from four cents to $8.90; and the school teacher who was usually unmarried, lived either at the home of the trustee or with one of the families in the school district, and received then a salary of $6 a week.

The building was still in use in 1938 but ceased functioning shortly after when it moved to more modern facilities.

Many of those boys and girls continued beyond the Greenfield school to become lawyers, doctors, and surgeons, some of national repute. Many others entered the hotel and resort business and are equally well known in their field of endeavor.

The initial step to restore this schoolhouse was taken by Morris Kanfer, a pupil of this school. With the help of David Levinson and under the guidance and supervision of Ben Miller, both one time students of this school, the project was completed. Aaron Feldherr, postmaster of Greenfield Park was advisor, advocate and secretary-treasurer of the project from its inception.

It was dedicated in June, 1965 and its oldest living pupil, Mary Patmore who was 96 at the time, cut a ribbon marking the official opening of the museum. Another pupil, Dr. Samuel Standard, a prominent surgeon and teacher, delivered the principal address.

=== Quaker Meeting House ===
Also as part of the museum is the Quaker meeting house right across the street from the museum, erected in about 1818 it is the oldest public building in the town of Wawarsing.

The first settler came to Greenfield in about 1790. Within a year several families had moved there from the vicinity of Westchester County and were followed by others within a few more years. They belonged to the "Society of Friends" and were known as "Friends" or "Quakers".

As the early Quakers died and their descendants moved away from Greenfield, before 1900 weekly services were replaced by one annual service, then abandoned entirely. In 1966 ownership was transferred to the town of Wawarsing who restored it to its present condition.
