= United States Post Office (Ellenville, New York) =

- U.S. Post Office
- U.S. National Register of Historic Places
- U.S. Historic district – Contributing property
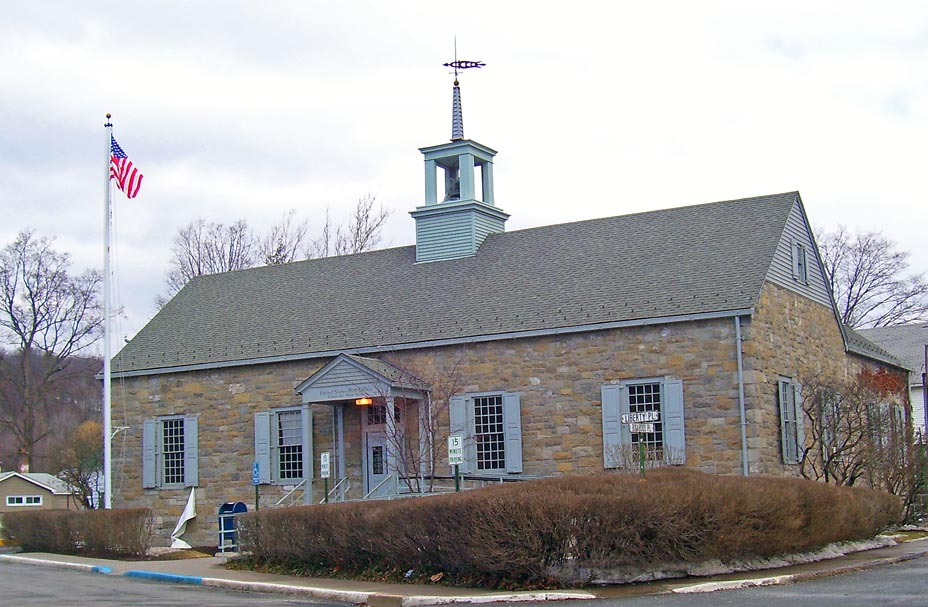
- The Ellenville post office ca. 2007

- Location within New York Location within the United States
- Interactive map showing the location for U.S. Post Office, Ellenville
- Location: 1 Liberty St., Ellenville, NY
- Nearest city: Kingston
- Coordinates: 41.7175°N 74.3930°W
- Area: less than one acre
- Built: 1940
- Architect: Louis Bouche, R. Stanley-Brown
- Architectural style: Colonial Revival
- MPS: US Post Offices in New York State, 1858-1943, TR
- NRHP reference No.: 88002496
- Added to NRHP: November 17, 1988

The U.S. Post Office in Ellenville, New York, United States, serves the ZIP code 12428, which covers Ellenville and much of the surrounding town of Wawarsing. It is located on Liberty Place in the center of the village.

The building was one of many post offices in the region which were built of stone, reflecting the historical Dutch influence in the Hudson Valley, during the New Deal by the Works Progress Administration. President Franklin D. Roosevelt personally approved the design. As a native of the region, he understood the importance of stone architecture and made sure that new post offices in the region were built in that style. In late 1939, villagers in Ellenville sent Roosevelt a telegram which complained that their new post office was to be brick, despite the presence of pre-Revolutionary stone houses in Ellenville's location, the Rondout Valley.

"I will stop this brick right away!" he vowed in response, and two days before construction bidding began, he sent the project back to the drawing board. The final building combined features typical of stone houses throughout the region.

It was added to the National Register of Historic Places in 1988. It is located in the Ellenville Downtown Historic District.
