= Miroslav Gregáň =

Slovak footballer (born 1996)

Personal information
- Full name: Miroslav Gregáň
- Date of birth: 26 April 1996 (age 30)
- Place of birth: Slovakia
- Height: 1.76 m (5 ft 9 in)
- Position: Midfielder

Team information
- Current team: SC Harland

Youth career
- –2014: Sitno Banská Štiavnica
- 2011–2013: → Dukla Banská Bystrica (loan)
- 2013–2014: → Pohronie (loan)

Senior career*
Years	Team	Apps	(Gls)
2014–2015	Pohronie	34	(3)
2016	Teplice	7	(0)
2016–2017	Pohronie	27	(2)
2017	Valašské Meziříčí	15	(5)
2018	Zvolen	11	(1)
2018	Liptovský Hrádok	14	(2)
2019	→ Dukla Banská Bystrica (loan)	4	(0)
2019	SC Melk	12	(2)
2020	Sitno Banská Štiavnica	8	(5)
2021–2022	SC Breitenbrunn	22	(3)
2023–	SC Harland	21	(6)

International career
2016	Slovakia U21	1	(0)
- * Club domestic league appearances and goals as of 22:59, 9 January 2024 (UTC)

Miroslav Gregáň (born 26 April 1996) is a Slovak footballer who currently plays in lower Austrian divisions as a midfielder. He is a former youth representative, playing for the U21s in 2016.

== Early life ==
Gregáň was born in Banská Štiavnica, where he would start playing for local clubs at a young age.

== Club career ==
Gregáň is a product of the FK Pohronie youth academy, being promoted to the A-team in August 2014.

=== FK Teplice ===
In the winter of 2016, Gregáň would go on trial to Czech First League side, FK Teplice. After impressing with his performances, he would permanently sign for Teplice. He made his professional debut for the club against Příbram on 13 February 2016.

== International career ==
Following his move to Teplice, Gregáň would receive his first international call-up, being nominated for the Slovakia national under-21 football team ahead of friendly matches against Turkey and Estonia. He featured in the 4–0 win against Estonia, coming on off the bench in the 62nd minute for Lukáš Haraslín.
