= New York, Ontario and Western Railway =

Abandoned railroad in the northeast United States

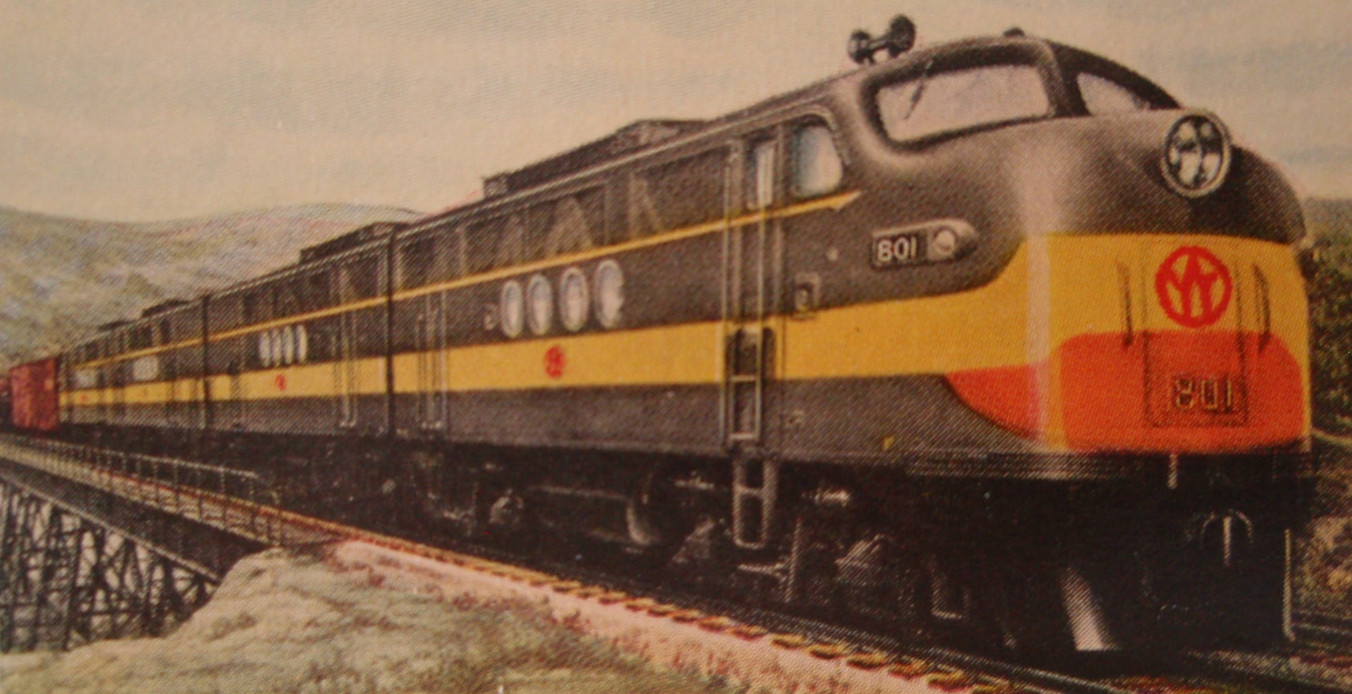
- A New York, Ontario and Western Railway diesel locomotive in 1947

Overview
- Headquarters: New York City, New York, U.S.
- Reporting mark: NYOW
- Locale: North Jersey, Upstate New York, and Northeastern Pennsylvania
- Dates of operation: 1884–1957

Technical
- Track gauge: 4 ft 8 1/2 in (1,435 mm) standard gauge
- Length: 541 mi (871 km)

The New York, Ontario and Western Railway, commonly known as the O&W or NYO&W, was a regional railroad founded in 1868. The last train ran from Norwich, New York, to Middletown, New York, in 1957, after which it was ordered liquidated by a U.S. bankruptcy judge. It was the first Class I U.S. railroad to be abandoned in its entirety.

The railroad began life as the New York and Oswego Midland Railroad, organized by Dewitt C. Littlejohn of Oswego, NY, in 1868. Its mainline extended from Weehawken, New Jersey, across the Hudson River from New York City, to Oswego, New York, a port city on Lake Ontario. It had branch lines to Kingston, Port Jervis, Monticello, Delhi, Utica and Rome, New York and Scranton, Pennsylvania. The part south of Cornwall, New York, was operated over the New York Central Railroad's West Shore Railroad via trackage rights.

== History ==
=== 19th century ===
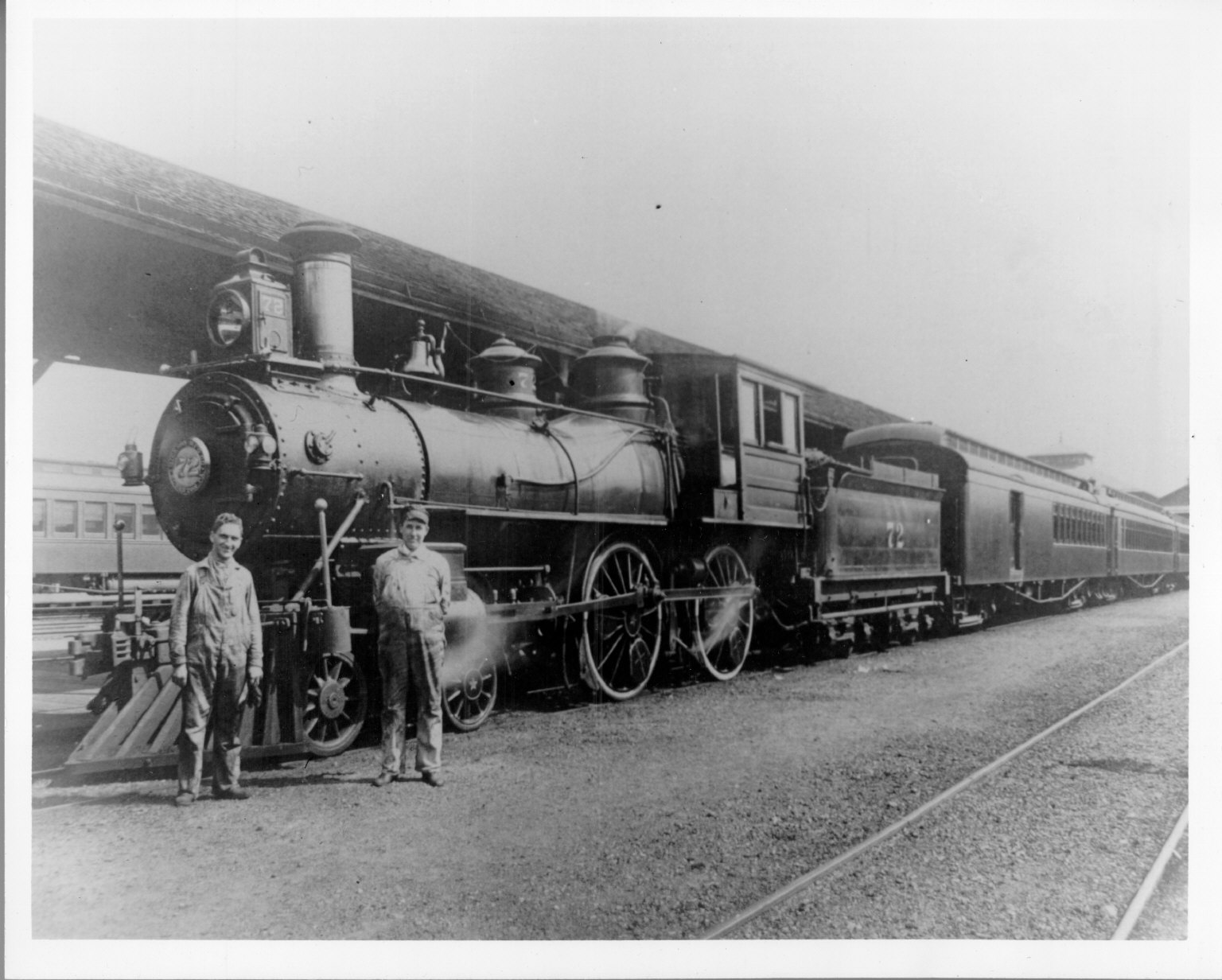
A New York, Ontario and Western Railway passenger train at Weehawken Terminal in Weehawken, New Jersey

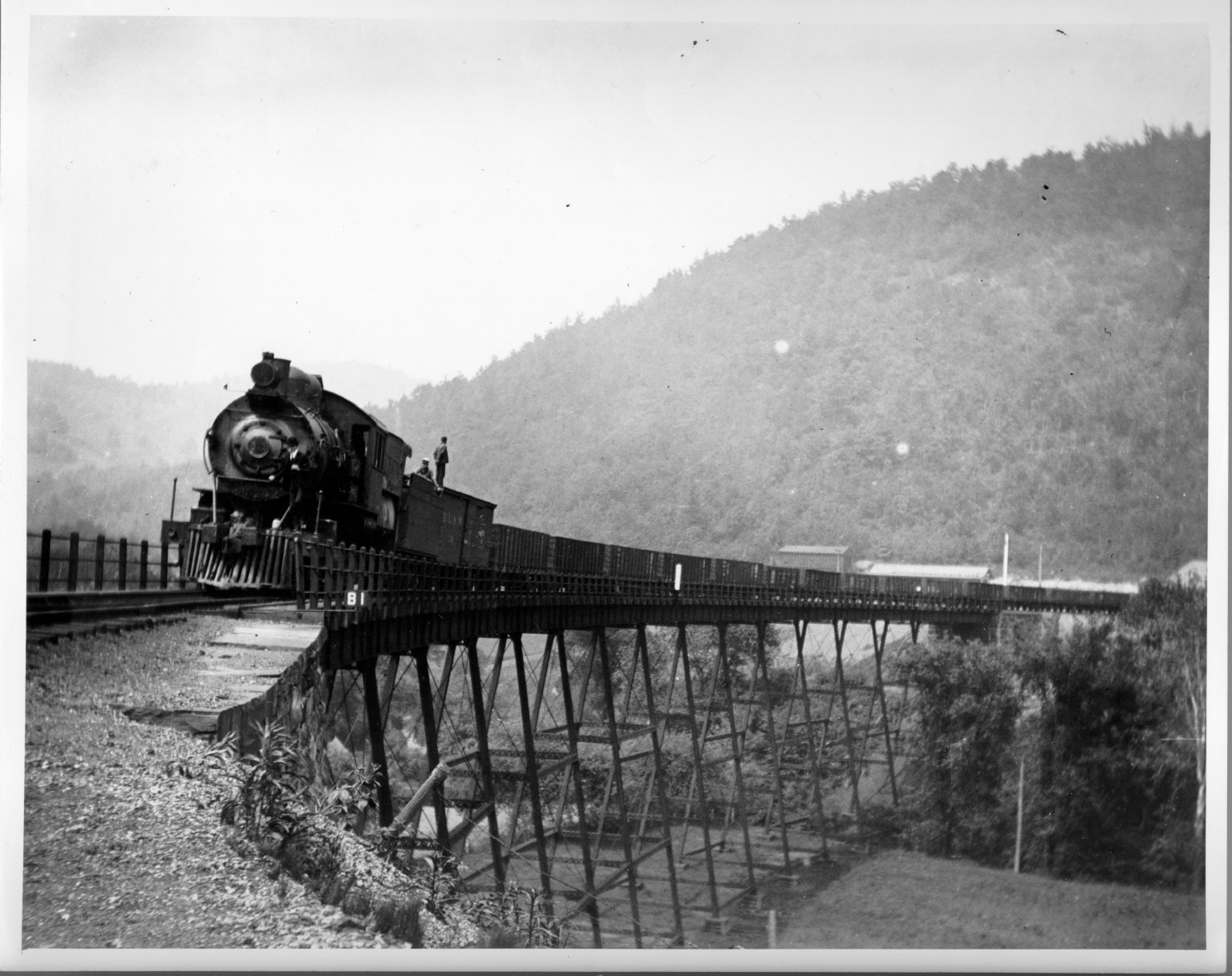
Engine 201 crossing Cadosia Trestle in Hancock, New York

In 1866, the New York and Oswego Midland Railroad was chartered under the direction of DeWitt C. Littlejohn, who envisioned a railroad serving a direct connection from the docks opposite New York City to Lake Ontario at Oswego. Construction on the line north of Middletown began in 1868 and was completed in 1873. Branches were also constructed to Ellenville, Delhi and New Berlin, New York; a branch was begun to Auburn from Norwich, but it only was constructed to Scipio Center before being sold to the Utica, Ithaca and Elmira Railroad in 1876. Access to New York City was provided by the Middletown, Unionville and Water Gap Railroad and the New Jersey Midland Railway beginning in 1872. On September 3, 1869, the NY&OM began using the Pennsylvania Railroad's station at Exchange Place in Jersey City, New Jersey, which provided its passengers with ferry access to the Cortlandt Street Ferry Depot in lower Manhattan and the Desbrosses Street Ferry. With the Panic of 1873, the company began to fold, and it severed its ties with the NJM and the MU&WG.

In 1880, O&W inherited the New York & Oswego Midland's lines. The O&W improved the main line by providing a new route to the New York City area from Middletown, New York, which extended to Cornwall on the Hudson River and then to Weehawken Terminal. This development was made possible by negotiating trackage-rights from the New York, West Shore & Buffalo Railway, later part of the New York Central system.

In 1886, O&W acquired the operations of both the Utica, Clinton & Binghamton and the Rome & Clinton railroads from the Delaware & Hudson Canal Company. By acquisition of these assets and construction of a new line to Sylvan Beach on the east shore of Lake Oneida, the O&W extended its operations into new market areas, and the Sylvan Beach Loop became a seasonally-significant corridor by providing transportation to central New York's recreational resort area. By 1889, the O&W added two new branches, New Berlin to Edmeston, and Port Jervis to Monticello, connecting to the main line at Summitville, New York.

The most significant addition occurred in 1890, when the O&W constructed a 54-mile branch from Cadosia, New York, through Carbondale to Scranton, Pennsylvania, and the rich anthracite coal reserves in Pennsylvania's Wyoming Valley. Revenues from this new Scranton Division strengthened O&W's revenues and provided the means for future improvements to the railroad. The railroad's W-in-O logo first appeared in 1892.

Revenue freight traffic, in millions of net ton-miles.
Year	Traffic
1925	688
1933	830
1944	957
1956	353

=== 20th century ===
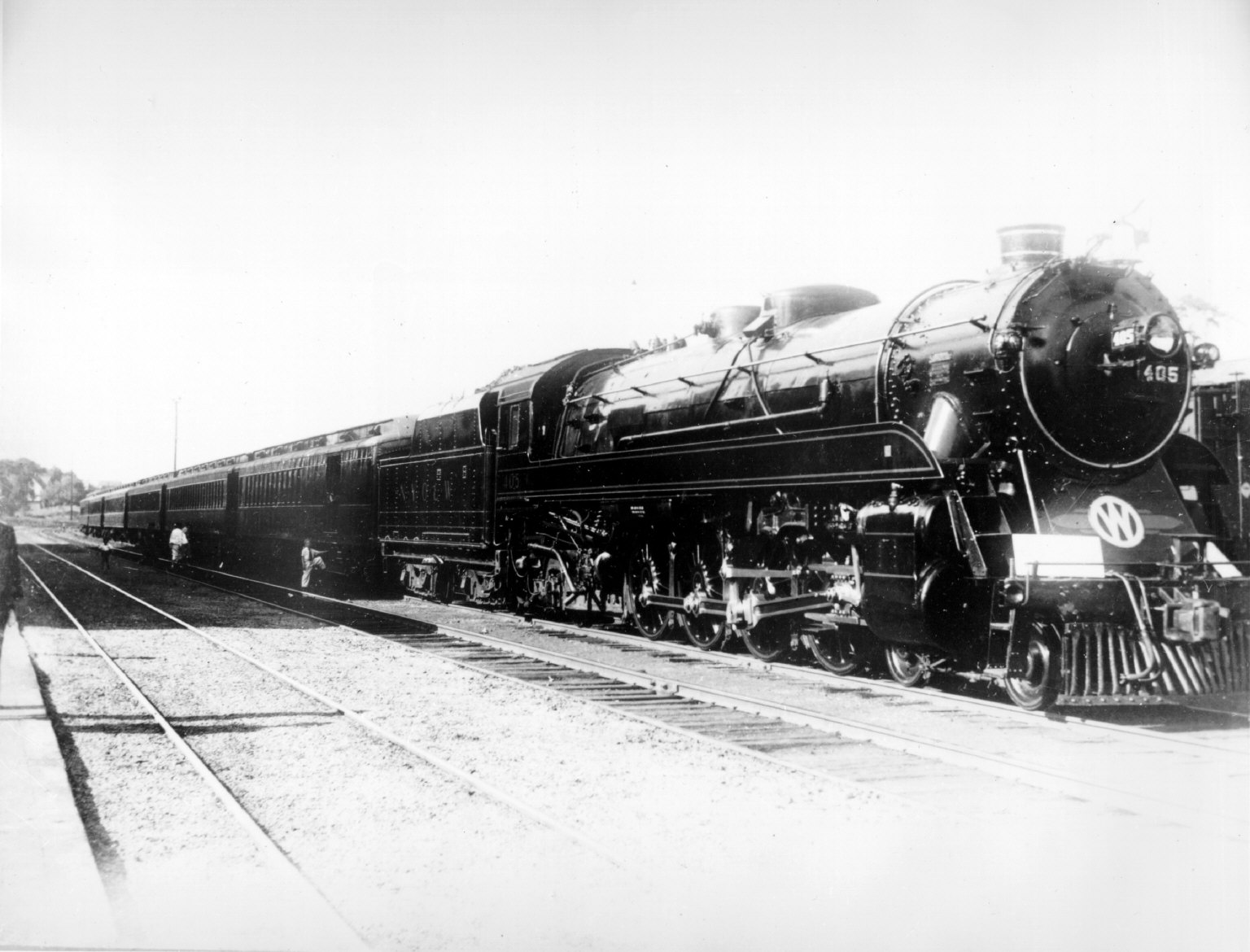
Engine 405

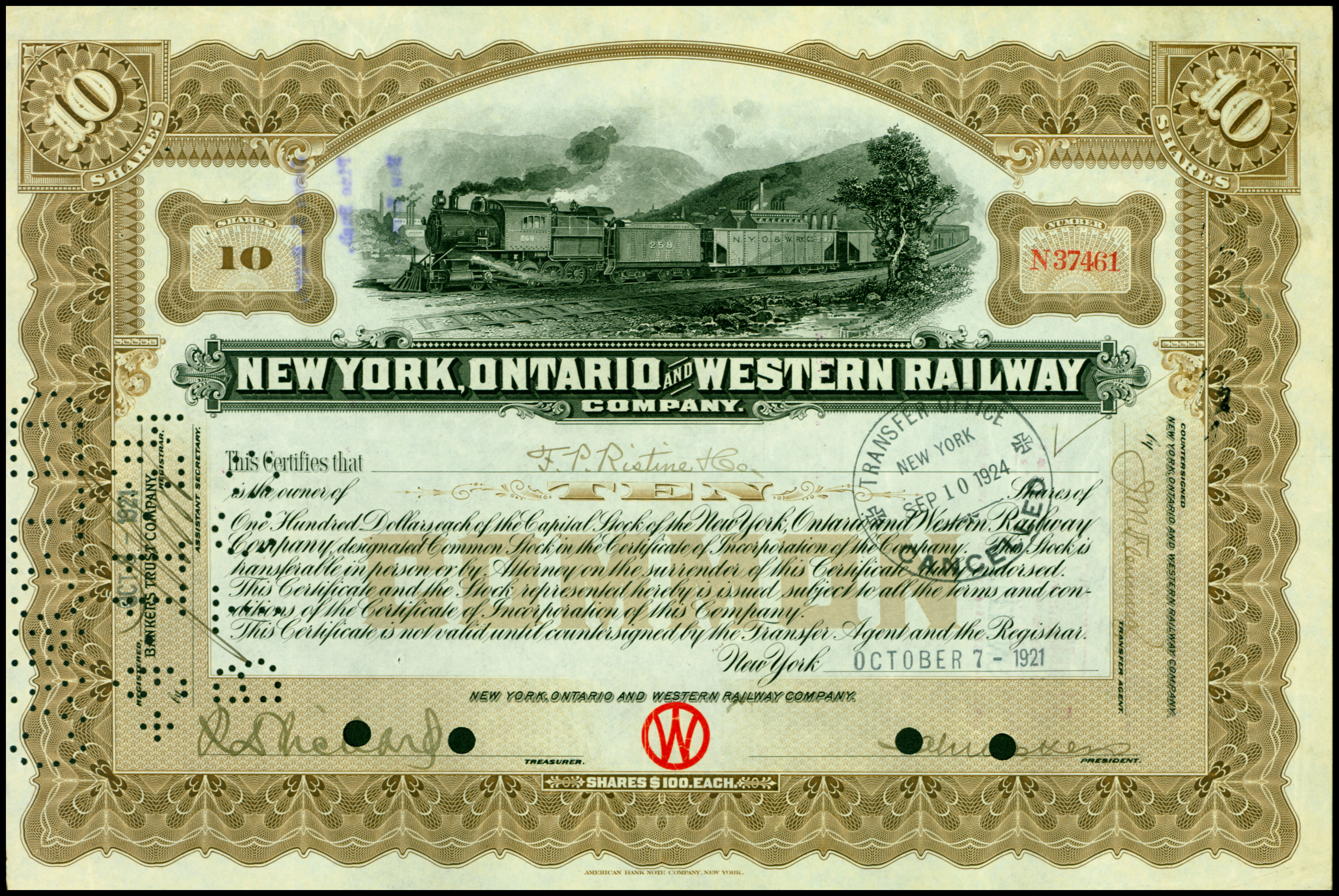
A stock share of the New York, Ontario and Western Railway, issued October 7, 1921

During the ill-fated "Morganization" of the New York, New Haven and Hartford Railroad (NH), the railroad acquired control of the O&W and installed NH president Charles Sanger Mellen as president for a year. Regulatory difficulties frustrated Mellen's plans to barter the O&W to the New York Central Railroad for concessions elsewhere.

The 1940s saw a receding of passenger service. In the early years of the 1940s, the Summitville-Kingston branch was reduced to a Sundays and holidays, summer-only service. Improved highways ended the O&W's passenger service to the resort areas of the lower Catskill Mountains (the "Borscht Belt") and lightly populated portions of Upstate New York, with the last train from Walton, New York, to Weehawken operating in the summer of 1948. The O&W's Walton-Delhi branch service, all in Delaware County, was also eliminated in this period. The last passenger train (from Roscoe, New York, just north of Livingston Manor, to Weehawken Terminal) operated on September 10, 1953.

By 1948, the operating losses had accumulated to over $38 million (equivalent to $497.32 million in 2024). The decrease of coal as a heating fuel for other than major power plants damaged its primary freight business, as did the end of rail transport of high-priority dairy products from Upstate New York to the Metro New York City area. The New Haven offered to purchase the company in 1952, but later withdrew its offer, citing its own financial problems. Abandonment was loudly-protested by towns along the line, which considered unpaid back taxes as an investment in the railroad. The New York State legislature approved a $1 million aid bill, citing the O&W as essential for civil defense, but the state civil defense commission rejected it.

The bankruptcy court finally ordered complete abandonment, and the last freight train ran from Norwich to Middletown on March 29, 1957. Liquidation proceeded shortly thereafter. Three large scrap dealers bought the entire right-of-way from the bankruptcy court soon afterward, and removed nearly all of the rails and bridges in 1958 and 1959. All O&W assets were auctioned. The diesel locomotives found new owners, but most of the other, antiquated rolling stock and equipment was scrapped. Certain sections of track serving shippers, many of which were industrial factories, were transferred by the bankruptcy court to other railroads, allowing continued rail access to the plants. The Delaware, Lackawanna and Western Railroad received track from Utica to New Hartford, New York, and track in Norwich, New York and Scranton, Pennsylvania. The New York Central took over sections of O&W New York track between Fulton and Oswego, and the tracks in Rome, Oneida, and Kingston. These transfers were approved before operations ceased at midnight on March 29, and the transfer of other sections to the Erie Railroad was approved later. A section of the track in New Hartford was still in operation in 2018 by the Northern Division of the New York, Susquehanna and Western Railway.

== Legacy ==
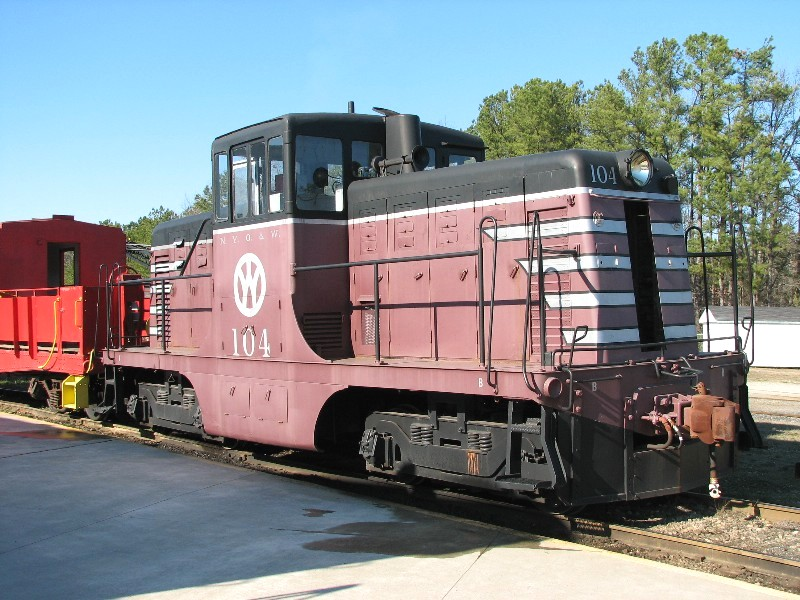
New York, Ontario and Western Railway 104, a General Electric 44-ton switcher preserved at the Southeastern Railway Museum in Duluth, Georgia

Rail historian George Drury later commented that the O&W "had always been sickly and should not have been built" at just "541 miles".

Parts of the Summitville - Kingston division, ending at Kingston, have become a rail trail. Some of the stations have been converted into residences, including the Alligerville station in High Falls, New York, owned by Gerry Leonard since 2001 and used as a recording studio. The Starlight station in Wayne County, Pennsylvania was acquired by Buckingham Township and servies as its Municipal Building.

On September 27, 1955, a 50-car O&W train in Hamilton, New York, traveling on a mainline approached a switch set for a siding which led to a coal trestle. Although the engineer fully-applied the brakes, the train continued up the siding at more than 30 miles per hour (48 km/h) and through the trestle. It was learned that the 213-ton EMD FT diesel locomotive at the head of the train "flew" a distance of 150 feet (46 m) beyond the coal trestle from an elevation of 15 feet (4.6 m). Two of the crew were seriously injured, but no crewmen were killed in the wreck.

An investigation by New York state police as to why the switch had been thrown resulted in no arrests. A dinner was later given in honor of the crew, who each received a plaque proclaiming them to be members of the O&W's new "Flying Diesel Corps." Each plaque was topped with a cast presentation model of their F-unit locomotive; the castings were provided by EMD.

One of the freight cars involved in the accident was loaded with chocolate bars from the Nestlé plant in nearby Fulton, New York. It was said that when the younger residents of Hamilton learned of the spilled candy, they raced to collect what they could, and that as a result candy sales in the town were for some time afterward very low.

When Savannah and Atlanta 750 was rebuilt in 1949, it received a new tender and other parts from an ex-NYO&W Y-series 4-8-2 which the S&A had bought in 1945. This 4-8-2 was scrapped afterward.

== See also ==
- O & W Railroad Station at Port Ben
