= Eugene Gregan =

American painter (born 1937)

Eugene Gregan (born 1937 in New Haven, Connecticut) is an American painter, graphic designer, and illustrator. He specializes in landscapes and Chinese-influenced painting.

Gregan attended the Rhode Island School of Design (BFA degree) and Yale University (MFA degree). At Yale University, he studied under Norman Ives, and Josef Albers.

He has taught at Rhode Island School of Design, Yale University, Brown University, Parsons School of Design, Trinity College, and the Naropa Institute. At Naropa Institute he taught classes in Chinese brush painting. His graphic and commercial design experience includes work with I.M. Pei, Herbert Matter on work including illustrations, corporate logos and album covers.

He lives in Napanoch, New York, with his wife Beverly.
