= Summitville, New York =

Summitville
- hamlet
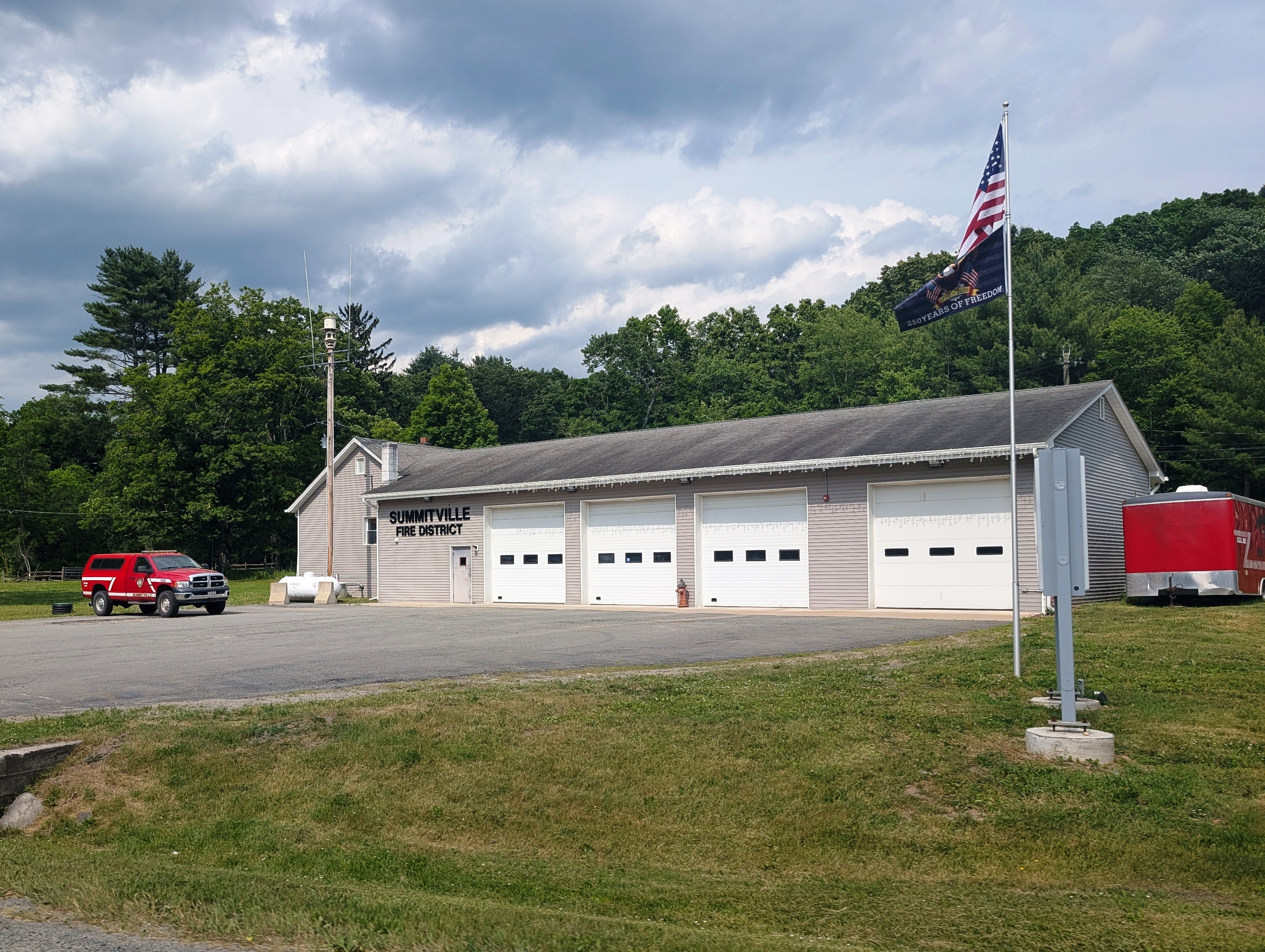
- Summitville Fire District station

- Location within the state of New York
- Coordinates: 41°37′17″N 74°27′03″W
- Country: United States
- State: New York
- County: Sullivan
- Time zone: UTC-5 (Eastern (EST))
  - Summer (DST): UTC-4 (EDT)
- ZIP codes: 12781

Summitville is a hamlet in the town of Mamakating in Sullivan County, New York, United States. The hamlet is located along U.S. Route 209. The postal ZIP code is 12781; the telephone exchange is predominantly 888 and overlaid 647 in area code 845.

== History ==
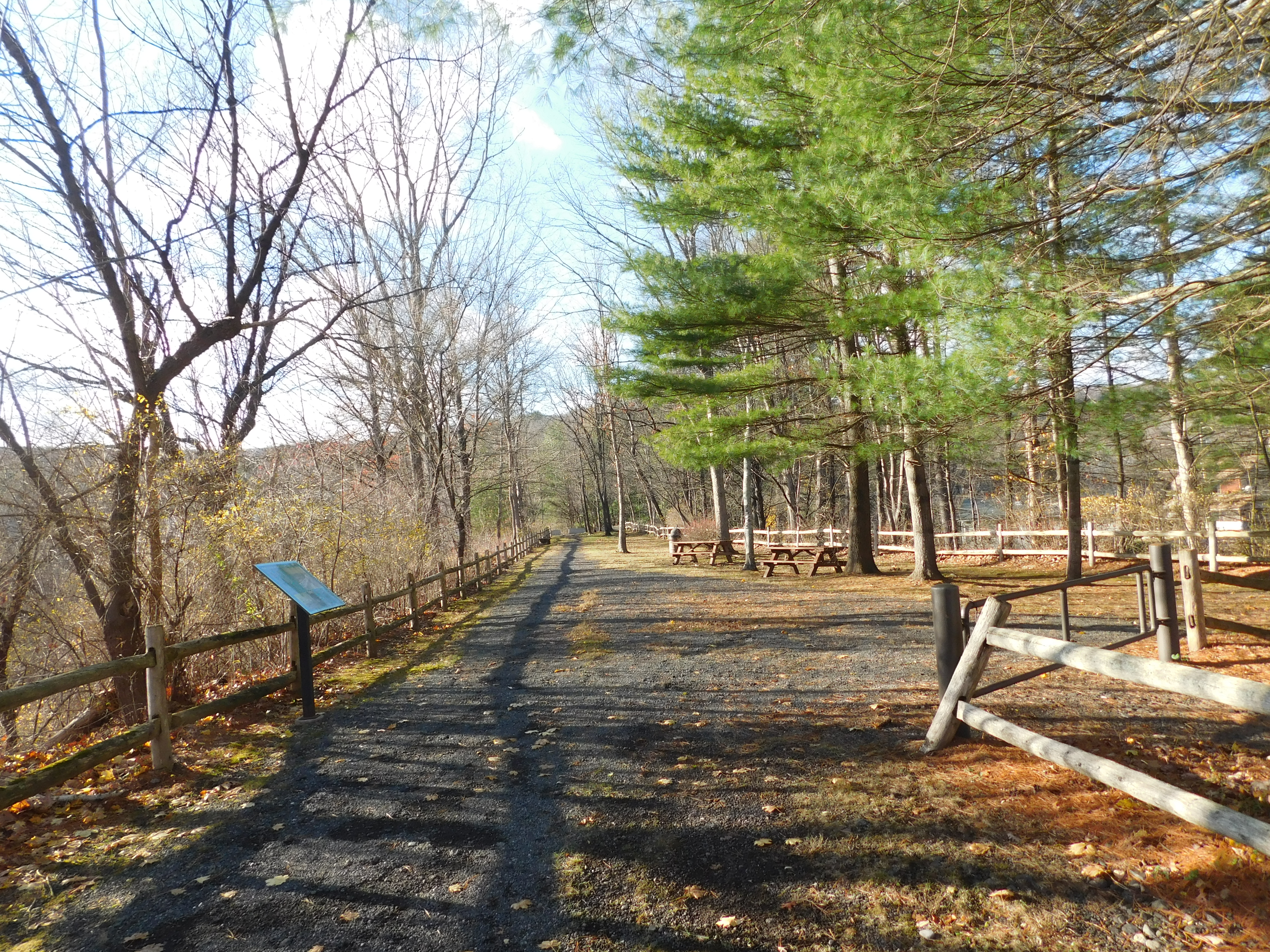
The site of the former Summitville station and junction of the New York, Ontario and Western Railway

Summitville was once a busy transportation hub. The name Summitville is derived from the fact that the Delaware and Hudson Canal summit lies within the town of Summitville. Water runs downhill in both directions towards the Hudson and the Delaware Rivers.

Later the New York, Ontario and Western Railway (O&W) had a major station in Summitville. The O&W had a junction off their main line that led to branch lines heading to Kingston to the northeast and Port Jervis and Monticello to the southwest.

== Geography ==
Summitville is located at 40°20′14″N, 85°38′35″W (40.337361, -85.642985).
