= Napanoch, New York =

- CDP
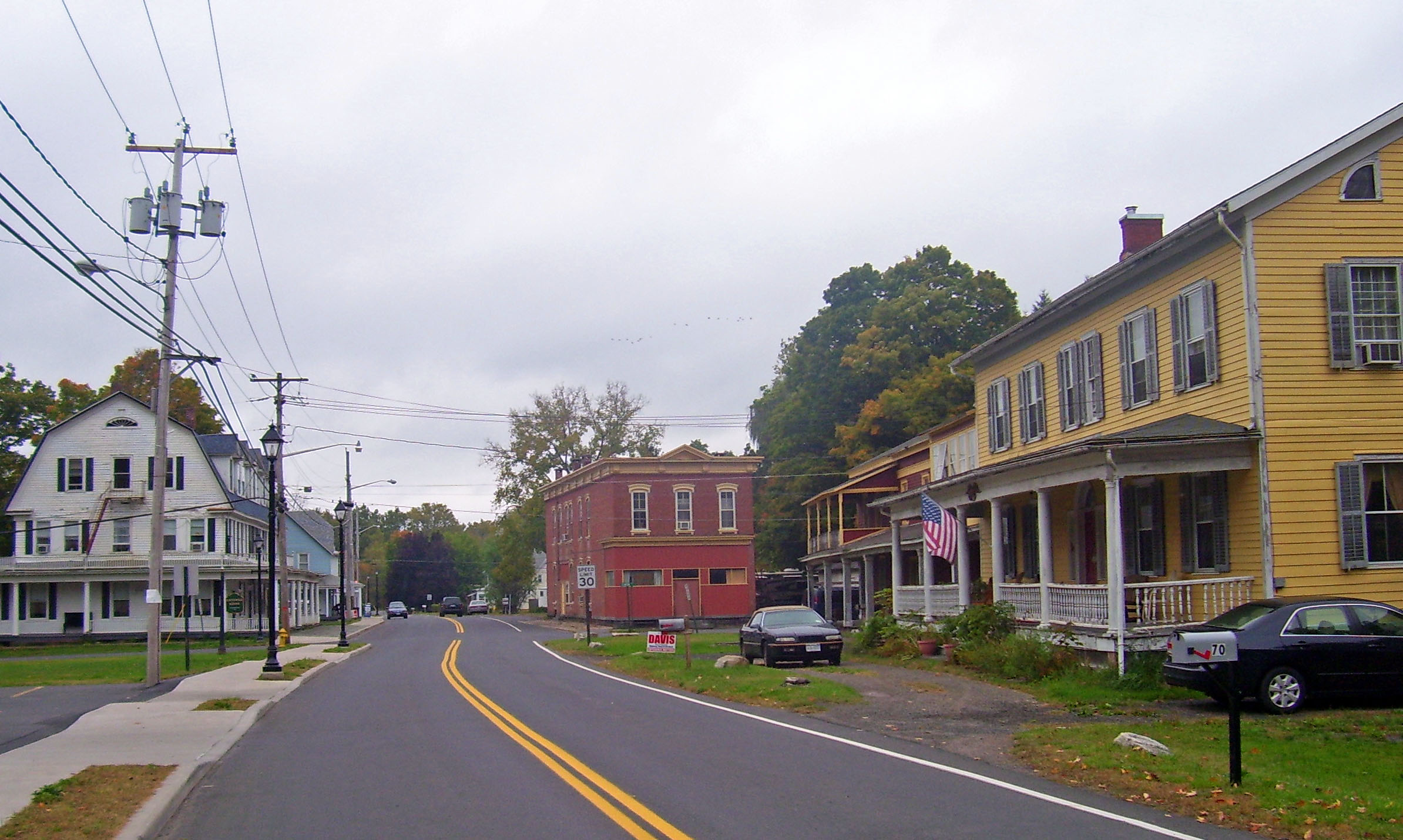
- Downtown Napanoch, 2007, with Hoornbeek Store Complex on right

- Location in Ulster County and the state of New York.
- Coordinates: 41°44′54″N 74°22′22″W
- Country: United States
- State: New York
- County: Ulster

Area
  - Total: 1.46 sq mi (3.79 km^{2})
  - Land: 1.44 sq mi (3.72 km^{2})
  - Water: 0.027 sq mi (0.07 km^{2})
- Elevation: 312 ft (95 m)

Population (2020)
  - Total: 1,131
  - Density: 790/sq mi (304/km^{2})
- Time zone: UTC-5 (EST)
  - Summer (DST): UTC-4 (EDT)
- ZIP code: 12458
- Area code: 845
- FIPS code: 36-49418
- GNIS feature ID: 0970395

Napanoch is a hamlet in Town of Wawarsing, in Ulster County, New York, United States. It is at the junction of routes 209 and 55. The population was 1,131 at the 2020 census. Napanoch is on the Shawangunk Ridge National Scenic Byway, and is part of the Hudson River Valley National Heritage Area.

== History ==
"Napanoch" is from the Munsee dialect of the northern Lenape, and is thought to mean land overflowed by water. It is from the original deed to that area. Old Route 209 and Main Street follow the Minisink Trail, the Lenape path between the Hudson and Delaware Rivers. Louis Bevier, the New Paltz patentee, bought the area for two of his sons, Jean Bevier and Abram Bevier in 1705 or 1706.

The Hoornbeek Store Complex and Ontario and Western Railroad Passenger Station are listed on the National Register of Historic Places. The imposing Eastern Correctional Facility was built by the state in 1900 as a reformatory. Since 1973 it has been a maximum security prison for men.

== Geography ==
Napanoch is in the Town of Wawarsing, in Ulster County (41.748231, -74.372710).

According to the United States Census Bureau, the census-designated place ("CDP") has a total area of 1.2 square miles (3.1 km^{2}), of which 1.2 square miles (3.1 km^{2}) is land and 0.04 square miles (0.10 km^{2}) (2.46%) is water.

== Demographics ==
Historical population
Census	Pop.	Note	%±
2000	1,168		—
2010	1,174		0.5%
2020	1,131		−3.7%
U.S. Decennial Census

As of the census of 2000, there were 1,168 people, 465 households, and 321 families residing in the CDP. The population density was 976.9 inhabitants per square mile (377.2/km^{2}). There were 509 housing units at an average density of 425.7 per square mile (164.4/km^{2}). The racial makeup of the CDP was 95.29% White, 1.20% African American, 0.09% Native American, 1.03% Asian, 0.26% from other races, and 2.14% from two or more races. Hispanic or Latino of any race were 3.00% of the population.

There were 465 households, out of which 32.7% had children under the age of 18 living with them, 52.9% were married couples living together, 12.5% had a female householder with no husband present, and 30.8% were non-families. 27.7% of all households were made up of individuals, and 13.8% had someone living alone who was 65 years of age or older. The average household size was 2.51 and the average family size was 3.01.

In the CDP, the population was spread out, with 26.2% under the age of 18, 6.4% from 18 to 24, 27.7% from 25 to 44, 25.3% from 45 to 64, and 14.3% who were 65 years of age or older. The median age was 38 years. For every 100 females, there were 89.9 males. For every 100 females age 18 and over, there were 85.0 males.

The median income for a household in the CDP was $35,221, and the median income for a family was $47,738. Males had a median income of $36,600 versus $29,063 for females. The per capita income for the CDP was $18,321. About 10.3% of families and 14.4% of the population were below the poverty line, including 24.0% of those under age 18 and 9.4% of those age 65 or over.

== Education ==
The CDP is in the Ellenville Central School District.

== Notable people ==
- Joe Bevilacqua, broadcaster, voice actor, author, comedian, documentarian
- Eugene Gregan, painter
- Harriette A. Keyser, industrial reformer
- Max Schubel, composer
- Jeff Whitty, playwright
