= Ellenville, New York =

Ellenville
- Village
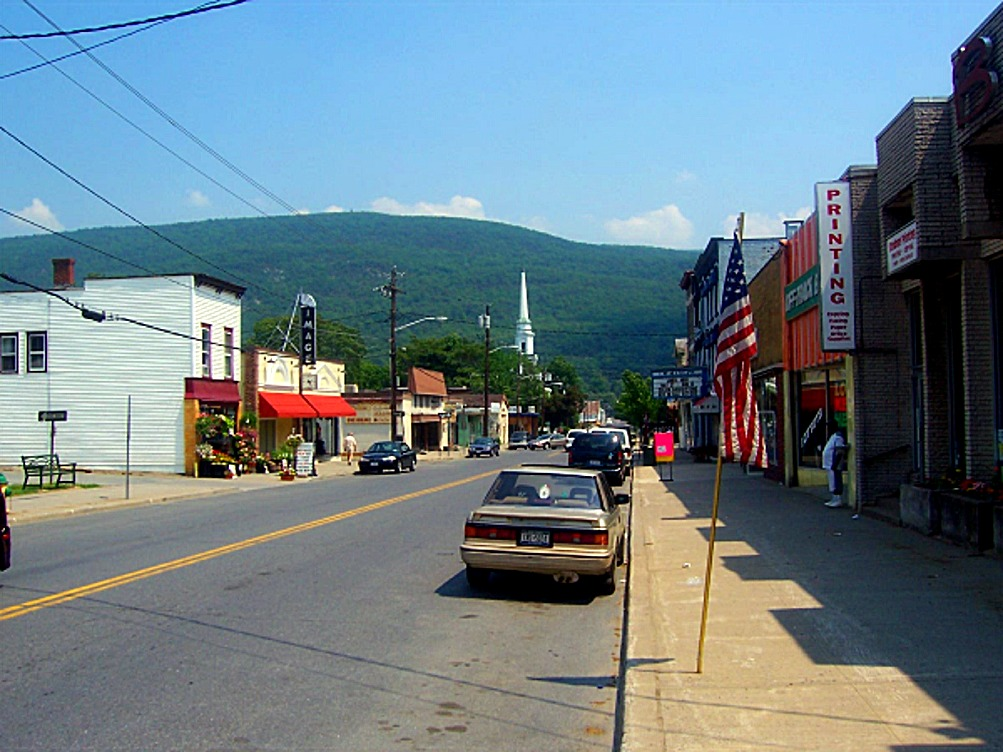
- Downtown Ellenville, looking east along Canal Street (NY 52) toward the Shawangunk Ridge (2007)

- Location in Ulster County and the state of New York.

- Location within the state of New York -->
- Coordinates: 41°43′01″N 74°23′36″W
- Country: United States
- State: New York
- County: Ulster
- Town: Wawarsing

Area
  - Total: 8.78 sq mi (22.74 km^{2})
  - Land: 8.69 sq mi (22.51 km^{2})
  - Water: 0.085 sq mi (0.22 km^{2})
- Elevation: 338 ft (103 m)

Population (2020)
  - Total: 4,167
  - Density: 479.4/sq mi (185.08/km^{2})
- Time zone: UTC−5 (Eastern (EST))
  - Summer (DST): UTC−4 (EDT)
- ZIP Code: 12428
- Area codes: 845
- FIPS code: 36-23965
- GNIS feature ID: 0949508

Ellenville is a village within the town of Wawarsing, Ulster County, New York, United States. Its population was 4,167 at the 2020 census.

== History ==
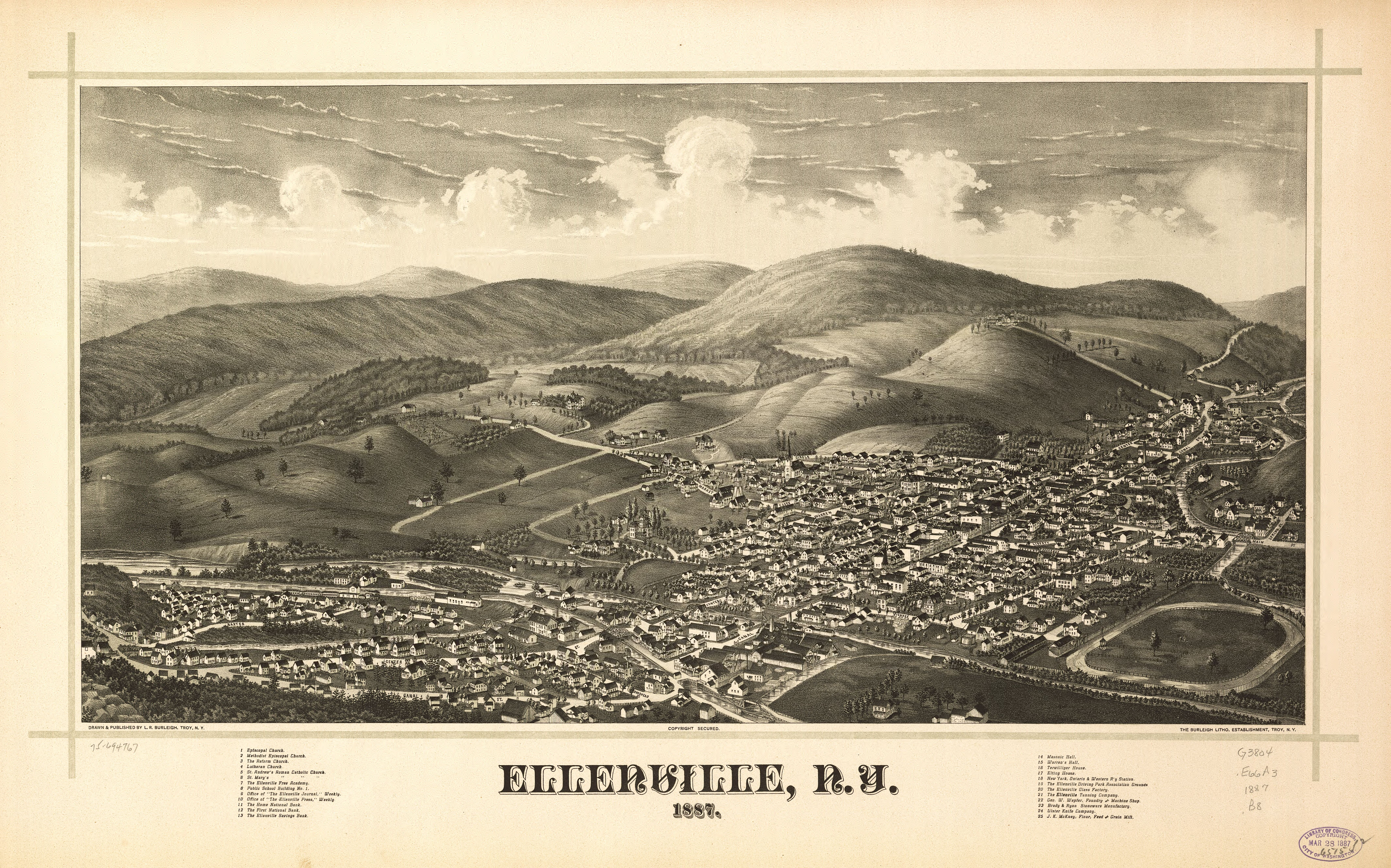
Perspective map of Ellenville from 1887 by L.R. Birleigh with a list of landmarks

The area was originally called "Socconessing" by the first inhabitants, the Esopus Munsee of the Lenape. Socconessing means "a muddy place where the water comes out", referencing the Sandburg Creek. The Esopus lived in this area for thousands of years before being pushed out by the early pioneers.

The first building erected in what is now the center of the village was built around 1798 by Alpheus Fairchild, who moved west from Connecticut. However, in what is now the easternmost part of the village, the Bodley homestead most likely stood well before the Revolution, as did portions of the Bevier and Sax farms. It was named "Fairchild City" or just "The City" after Alpheus Fairchild, who bought most of today's village in 1798 from John A. DeWitt; Fairchild had a dwelling erected on part of the site where the George and John R. Hunt Memorial Building stands today. Nathan and Maria Hoornbeek bought the dwelling and enlarged it, converting it into an inn. The Hoornbeek Tavern was a gathering place for the citizens, and many important decisions about the community were made at meetings held there. Indeed, the decision to change the name of the community to "Ellenville" was proposed at the Hoornbeek Tavern. Village leaders, unable to agree upon a new name, were persuaded by Ellen Snyder, Maria Hoornbeek's sister, to name the village after her.

Charles Hartshorn came to "The City" to try a case in the Hoornbeek Tavern in 1823. He opened the first store that same year, and led a drive to choose a "real" name for the community. Hartshorn also applied to the federal government for approval of a post office and was named the first postmaster. He later erected a home for his family on the former site of the Hoornbeek Tavern. In 1856, he was elected first president of the newly incorporated village of Ellenville.

Noted American composer Homer Newton Bartlett resided at 32 Maple Avenue in Ellenville for many years during the late 19th century.

Just north of the village, the Joseph Y. Resnick Airport (N89) is named in honor and memory of U.S. Congressman Joseph Yale Resnick, a Wawarsing native. Ellenville Regional Hospital, just north of the airport, and the Nevele Tower, just south of the village, were both dedicated by then-President Lyndon B. Johnson, at Congressman Resnick's request.

Ellenville was the fourth community featured on ABC's television show, My Kind of Town, recorded in New York City on August 6, 2005, and broadcast on September 4, 2005.

The village's Christ Lutheran Church and Parsonage, Ellenville Downtown Historic District, George and John R. Hunt Memorial Building, and United States Post Office are listed in the National Register of Historic Places.

Ellenville has three copies of the statue known as The Boy with the Leaking Boot.

Due to good launch sites and favorable weather conditions, Ellenville became a major center for the development of hang gliding in the 1970s and 1980s. The area is now home to three major hang-gliding schools and is considered one of the best sites for instruction east of the Mississippi. On most weekends, hang gliders can be seen launching off of two sites on the Shawangunk Ridge just south of Nevele and Honors Haven.

=== St. Mary's Church ===
Father John Raffeiner was a German priest who ministered to German-speaking Catholics throughout the Diocese of New York well before it was split into the dioceses of Albany, Brooklyn, Buffalo, and Newark. Ellenville was one of his less accessible destinations, but he formed a congregation there in 1850. Rev. John Raufeisen became pastor and built a small frame structure known as St. Mary's. Raufeisen also established the Church of Sts. Michael and Wendilinus in Ulster Heights, and the Church of the Immaculate Conception in Woodbourne, where a number of Bavarians had settled. He preached in Bridgeville, Callicoon, Fallsburgh, Grahamsville, Lackawack, Neversink, North Branch, Otisville, Stephen's, and Factories. Raffeiner assisted in establishing St. Peter's for the German community of Rondout. From 1861 Raufeisen lived in Rondout, where the need was greater, but continued to visit Ellenville.

In 1864, Rev. George J. Veith was appointed pastor of St. Mary's, Ellenville, although he resided in Jeffersonville. In 1871, Rev. Constantine Van Drost became St. Mary's first resident pastor. In 1881,, Rev. Andrew J. Sauer built a new church, dedicated to St. Andrew. In 1903, a dam above the village burst, threatening to carry away St. Mary's, when a floating barge lodged against a tree, diverting the water.

== Geography ==
The village of Ellenville is about 90 miles northwest of New York City and 90 miles southwest of Albany. The village is located at the junction of routes NY 52 and U.S. Route 209, and is bisected by the recently designated Shawangunk Scenic Byway. Ellenville lies in the Rondout Valley, at the eastern base of the Catskill Mountains, and the western base of the Shawangunk Ridge, which is listed by the Nature Conservancy as one of the "75 Last Great Places on Earth."

The north-flowing Sandburg Creek and east-flowing Beer Kill intersect in Ellenville near the current site of the Ellenville Central School and join the Rondout Creek, which flows north to join the Hudson River near Kingston. Ellenville is within the Hudson River Valley National Heritage Area.

According to the United States Census Bureau, the village has a total area of 8.8 square miles (22.7 km^{2}), of which 0.1 square mile (0.2 km^{2}, 0.68%) is covered by water.

== Demographics ==
Historical population
Census	Pop.	Note	%±
1880	2,750		—
1890	2,881		4.8%
1900	2,879		−0.1%
1910	3,114		8.2%
1920	3,116		0.1%
1930	3,280		5.3%
1940	4,000		22.0%
1950	4,225		5.6%
1960	5,003		18.4%
1970	4,482		−10.4%
1980	4,405		−1.7%
1990	4,243		−3.7%
2000	4,130		−2.7%
2010	4,135		0.1%
2020	4,167		0.8%
U.S. Decennial Census

=== 2020 census ===
As of the 2020 census, Ellenville had a population of 4,167. The median age was 36.7 years. 26.5% of residents were under the age of 18 and 14.2% of residents were 65 years of age or older. For every 100 females there were 91.1 males, and for every 100 females age 18 and over there were 88.8 males age 18 and over.

99.2% of residents lived in urban areas, while 0.8% lived in rural areas.

There were 1,579 households in Ellenville, of which 37.0% had children under the age of 18 living in them. Of all households, 35.1% were married-couple households, 19.8% were households with a male householder and no spouse or partner present, and 32.9% were households with a female householder and no spouse or partner present. About 28.7% of all households were made up of individuals and 11.8% had someone living alone who was 65 years of age or older.

There were 1,846 housing units, of which 14.5% were vacant. The homeowner vacancy rate was 4.9% and the rental vacancy rate was 7.3%.

Racial composition as of the 2020 census
Race	Number	Percent
White	2,311	55.5%
Black or African American	617	14.8%
American Indian and Alaska Native	28	0.7%
Asian	85	2.0%
Native Hawaiian and Other Pacific Islander	3	0.1%
Some other race	537	12.9%
Two or more races	586	14.1%
Hispanic or Latino (of any race)	1,346	32.3%

=== 2010 census ===
As of the census of 2010, 4,135 people, 1,578 households (occupied housing units), and 1,047 families were residing in the village. The population density was 475.3 inhabitants per square mile (183.5/km^{2}). The 1,845 total housing units had an average density of 212.1/sq mi (82.0/km^{2}). The racial makeup of the village was 68.16% White, 13.7% African American, 1.3% Native American, 2.4% Asian, 7.8% from other races, and 6.7% from two or more races. About 27.9% of the population were Hispanics or Latinos of any race.

Of the 1,578 households, 38.4% had children under 18 living with them, 38.3% were married couples living together, 6.1% had a male householder with no wife present, 21.9% had a female householder with no husband present, and 33.7% were not families. About 27.7% of all households were made up of individuals living alone, and 11.2% had someone living alone who was 65 or older. The average household size was 2.58, and the average family size was 3.09.

In the village, the age distribution was 28.5% under 18, 7.6% from 18 to 24, 25.9% from 25 to 44, 25.9% from 45 to 64, and 12.1% who were 65 or older. The median age was 35.9 years. For every 100 females, there were 94.1 males. For every 100 females age 18 and over, there were 89.1 males.

=== Income and poverty ===
Based on 1999 income (the latest available figures), the median income for a household in the village was $27,474, and for a family was $40,942. Males had a median income of $30,732 versus $21,250 for females. The per capita income for the village was $15,272. 23.4% of the population and 20.8% of families were below the poverty line. 31.4% of those under the age of 18 and 15.2% of those 65 and older were living below the poverty line.

== Government ==
Ellenville is one of three incorporated villages in Ulster County, along with New Paltz and Saugerties.

Ellenville village offices are housed at the Ellenville Government Center, 2 Elting Court. In 2007, the village transferred its offices and the police department from its location at North Main Street, primarily to address the old village hall's limited space and failure to meet mandated handicapped-accessibility requirements.

The government of Ellenville is headed by an elected board composed of a mayor and four trustees. As of 2007, all terms were increased from two to four years, and elections were moved from March to November, to be held on odd-numbered years only. Daily administration of Ellenville is supervised by an appointed village manager, an appointed village clerk, an appointed village treasurer, and department heads for the five departments: police, street, building and code enforcement, water, sewer.

== Notable people ==
- Natalie Appleton, Canadian pop singer and actress, attended high school here.
- George M. Beebe, U.S. Representative, lived here later in his career.
- Barbara Bel Geddes, actress, Dallas
- William E. Cleary, U.S. Representative
- Jim Conroy, voice actor
- Isaac N. Cox, U.S. Representative
- Denny Dillon, actress and comedian
- Mari Gilbert, murder victim advocate and activist
- Sal Giorgianni, jazz musician
- Julius Hatofsky, artist
- Isaac Heller (1926–2015), American toy manufacturer, co-founder of Remco
- Harold Leventhal, music manager
- Darryl Nirenberg, U.S. ambassador to Romania
- Joseph Y. Resnick, U.S. representative
- William F. Scoresby, physician and politician
- Joseph Terwilliger, geneticist
- Joseph Hasbrouck Tuthill, U.S. Representative
- Irwin Redlener, American pediatrician and public health activist
- Buddy Hackett, American actor and comedian
- James Caan, American actor
- Pete Michels, American animation director whose credits include The Simpsons, Family Guy, and Rick and Morty
- Brooke Mueller, actress

== Transportation ==
One of the first roads in America, the Old Mine Road, which followed earlier Indian trails, led to sporadic Dutch and later settlements along its 104-mile (167 km) length from New Jersey to Kingston, including Ellenville, but with no navigable rivers, the construction of the Delaware & Hudson Canal in the 1820s led to the first major boom in development of Ellenville as a canal town and manufacturing center. The D&H Canal was eventually superseded at the close of the 19th century by the New York, Ontario and Western Railway, more commonly known as the O&W or NYO&W, which opened up a significant tourism and hospitality industry, including dozens of hotels, inns, boarding houses, and bungalow colonies. The eventual modernization of the Old Mine Road into US 209 continued to bring vacationers to the area, even after passenger railroad service was discontinued in the 1940s.

== Commerce ==
The canal and westward expansion led to various industrial opportunities. Reportedly, very pioneer wagon heading west carried a Napanoch axe and an Ellenville demijohn. Ellenville pottery and glassworks still remain sought-after collector items; many examples are on display at the Ellenville Public Library's Terwilliger House Museum. Knife manufacturing was a major industry in Ellenville and Napanoch for over 100 years; the Ulster Knife Company set up in the 1870s, eventually merging with Imperial Knife Company and Schrade Cutlery, finally becoming Imperial Schrade until its closing in 2004.

In the early 20th century, the rediscovery of the lost Old Spanish Tunnel at the base of the Shawangunk Ridge in Ellenville led to the development of the Sun-Ray Spring and the international marketing by White Rock beverage entrepreneur Frank T. Huntoon of Sun-Ray Water, tested and promoted as the "World's Purest Spring Water". Although beset by financial difficulties from its inception, the water and its carbonated derivatives were sold until the early 1920s, and redeveloped as "Pure Rock Mineral Water" in 1939, also serving as a base for Pepsi-Cola bottled in Ellenville during World War II.

In the late 1940s, Joseph Resnick, a radio officer in the U.S. Merchant Marine during the war, developed a turnable DIY antenna system just as the TV boom was taking off. With his brothers Harry and Louis, he created Channel Master, and built one of the region's major manufacturing plants just north of the Ellenville border, along with an aluminum plant to fabricate necessary components. After selling the company to Avnet, production moved to South Carolina. The vacated Channel Master factory was eventually bought by Imperial Schrade, and the aluminum plant by VAW, and later Hydro Aluminum; both factories closed in the 2000s, leaving hundreds unemployed, compounding Ellenville's economic doldrums that began with a decline of the tourism and hotel industry in the 1960s, and the development of regional shopping malls, which directed much shopping traffic away from the village.

=== Tourism ===
Relatively inexpensive and increased air travel beginning in the 1960s, a generational change in tastes, and, most recently, the economic downturn's impact on tourism in general, though, have taken their toll. The Nevele Grande Hotel was closed in 2009. Its sister resort hotel, the Fallsview, has recently been purchased and renamed Honor's Haven, and has undergone major renovations and introduced health-related programs in an attempt to attract new customers.

The Borscht Belt Festival was held for the first time in Ellenville in July 2023, with additional festivals in 2024 and one scheduled for 2025.

== Education ==
The village is in the Ellenville Central School District. Ellenville is served by Ellenville Central School for prekindergarten to grade 12. In 1938, Ellenville adopted the Blue Devil as the official mascot.
