= Wawarsing, New York =

- Town
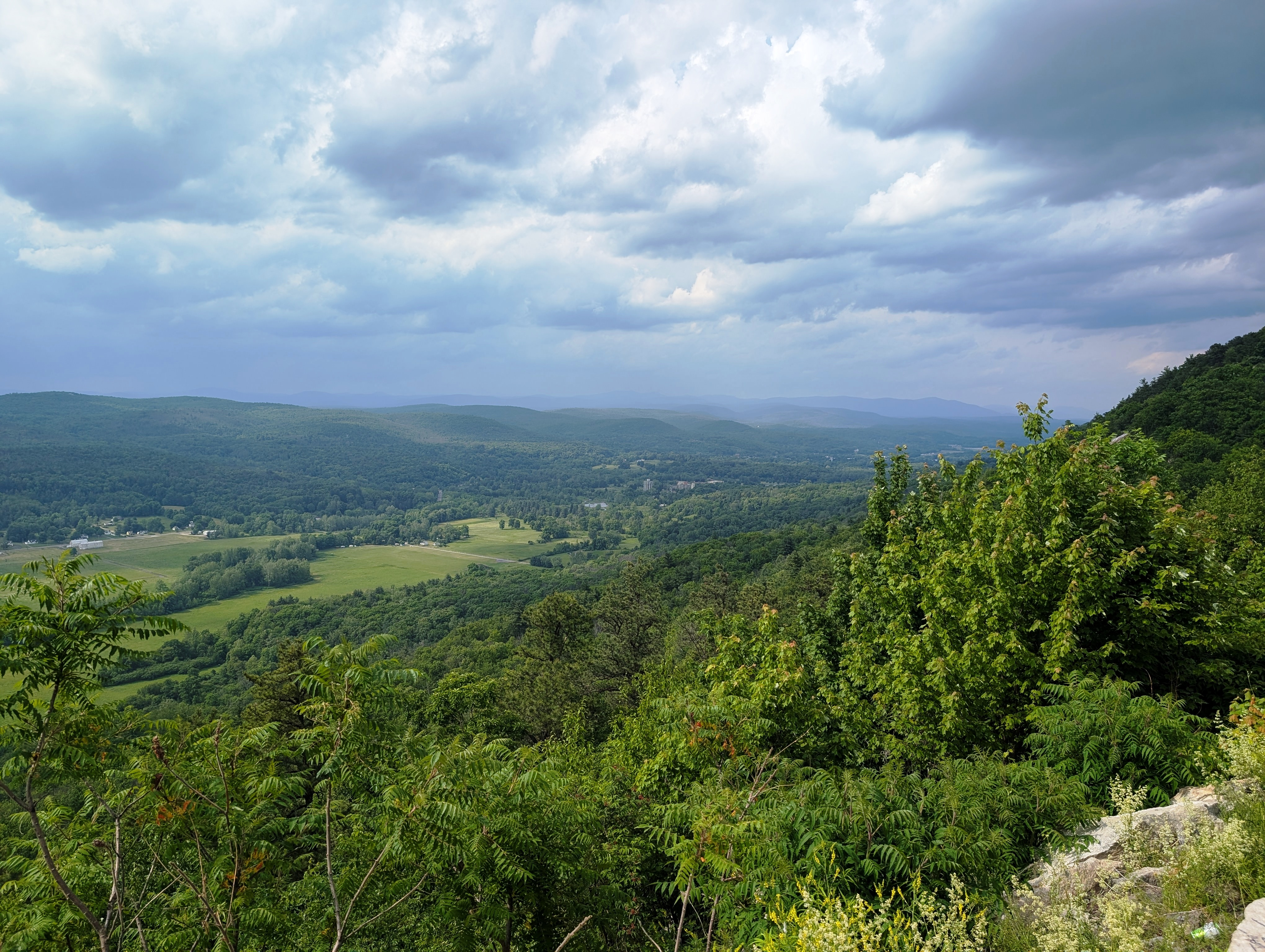
- Aerial view of Wawarsing and Ellenville from the Shawangunk Ridge

- Location in Ulster County and the state of New York.
- Coordinates: 41°44′25″N 74°23′59″W
- Country: United States
- State: New York
- County: Ulster

Area
  - Total: 133.86 sq mi (346.70 km^{2})
  - Land: 130.51 sq mi (338.01 km^{2})
  - Water: 3.36 sq mi (8.69 km^{2})
- Elevation: 1,204 ft (367 m)

Population (2020)
  - Total: 12,771
  - Density: 97.857/sq mi (37.783/km^{2})
- Time zone: UTC-5 (Eastern (EST))
  - Summer (DST): UTC-4 (EDT)
- ZIP code: 12489
- Area code: 845
- FIPS code: 36-78828
- GNIS feature ID: 0979609
- Website: Town website

Wawarsing /wəˈwɔːrsɪŋ/ is a town in Ulster County, New York, United States. The population was 12,771 at the 2020 census. The name Wawarsing was once believed to mean "a place where the streams wind" in the Lenape language, referring to the geography in the hamlet of Wawarsing; specifically, the joining of the Ver Nooy Kill and the Rondout Creek at Port Ben. The name Wawarsing was used by the Lenape to designate the current hamlet and the fields to the north and south of it for at least six miles in both directions. It is the only Lenape name known to refer to an exact location in Ulster County.

The town is in the western part of the county. The southern and easternmost portions are on the Shawangunk Ridge. Most of the hilly town is in the Appalachian foothills, while the northernmost part is in the Catskills. It has three state forests (Shawangunk Ridge, VerNooykill, and Witches Hole), as well as most of Minnewaska State Park and Sam's Point Preserve, and portions of the Catskill Preserve and Sundown State Park. US 209 crosses the town, passing through many principal communities: Spring Glen, Laurenkill, Ellenville, Napanoch, the hamlet of Wawarsing, Soccanissing, and Kerhonkson. US 44 begins at a junction with 209 near the east town line. N.Y. Route 52 runs east–west near the southern border. All three roads are part of the Shawangunk Ridge National Scenic Byway.

== History ==
The Lenape settlement "at Wawarasinke" was burned by English militiamen, led by Marten Crieger, after the Natives attacked Wiltwyck and took captives in 1663. In 1685, Warnaar Hoornbeek leased land there and was accepted as its first European pioneer. In 1703 the areas of Mombaccus and Wawarasink, Ulster County, were made The Town of Rochester. During The Revolutionary War, Wawarsing, Napanoch and Pinebush (Kerhonkson area) were attacked by British raiders, who massacred many women and children and burned the farms. In 1906, Wawarsing, Napanoch, Laurenkil, Lackawack and Grenfield joined together to form The Town of Wawarsing out of Southern Rochester and parts of unincorporated Ulster County.

The O & W Railroad Station at Port Ben was listed on the National Register of Historic Places in 2002.

== Geography ==
According to the United States Census Bureau, the town has a total area of 133.9 square miles (347 km^{2}), of which 130.8 square miles (339 km^{2}) is land and 3.1 square miles (8.0 km^{2}) (2.32%) is water.

The western and southern borders of the town are Sullivan County, New York.

The northern part of the town is the southernmost portion of the Catskill Mountains. The eastern border is the Shawangunk Ridge (pronounced Shaw-ong-ungk). Rondout Creek passes through the town, as do the Sandburg, Laurenkill, Beerkill, Fantinekill and Vernooy Kill creeks.

== Demographics ==
Historical population
Census	Pop.	Note	%±
1820	1,811		—
1830	2,738		51.2%
1840	4,044		47.7%
1850	6,459		59.7%
1860	8,311		28.7%
1870	8,151		−1.9%
1880	8,547		4.9%
1890	7,758		−9.2%
1900	7,225		−6.9%
1910	7,787		7.8%
1920	6,910		−11.3%
1930	7,437		7.6%
1940	9,260		24.5%
1950	9,912		7.0%
1960	11,245		13.4%
1970	11,690		4.0%
1980	12,956		10.8%
1990	12,348		−4.7%
2000	13,936		12.9%
2010	13,157		−5.6%
2020	12,771		−2.9%
U.S. Decennial Census 2020

As of the census of 2000, there were 12,889 people, 4,382 households, and 2,966 families residing in the town. The population density was 98.6 inhabitants per square mile (38.1/km^{2}). There were 5,821 housing units at an average density of 44.5 per square mile (17.2/km^{2}). The racial makeup of the town was 75.03% white, 12.45% African American, .52% Native American, 1.17% Asian, .01% Pacific Islander, 7.76% from other races, and 3.06% from two or more races. Hispanic or Latino of any race were 18.05% of the population.

There were 4,382 households, out of which 32.4% had children under the age of 18 living with them, 46.8% were married couples living together, 14.9% had a female householder with no husband present, and 32.3% were non-families. 26.2% of all households were made up of individuals, and 11.8% had someone living alone who was 65 years of age or older. The average household size was 2.57 and the average family size was 3.07.

In the town, the population was spread out, with 23.2% under the age of 18, 8.2% from 18 to 24, 33.1% from 25 to 44, 23.4% from 45 to 64, and 12.1% who were 65 years of age or older. The median age was 37 years. For every 100 females, there were 117.1 males. For every 100 females age 18 and over, there were 119.9 males.

The median income for a household in the town was $35,872, and the median income for a family was $43,828. Males had a median income of $32,121 versus $24,656 for females. The per capita income for the town was $16,512. About 13.3% of families and 19.1% of the population were below the poverty line, including 23.6% of those under age 18 and 12.9% of those age 65 or over.

== Communities and locations in Wawarsing ==
- East Wawarsing – a hamlet southeast of Wawarsing hamlet.
- Ellenville – a village at the junction of routes 52 and 209. The town government building is located on Canal Street, Ellenville.
- Cragsmoor – a hamlet in the southeastern part of the town.
- Dairyland – a hamlet near the western town line on Route 52.
- Greenfield Park – a hamlet west of Ellenville on Route 52.
- Kerhonkson – a hamlet located by the northern town line along Route 209.
- Honk Hill – located in Napanoch, near Honk Lake.
- Honk Lake – a small lake south of Honk Hill.
- Lackawack – a hamlet northwest of Wawarsing hamlet and at the edge of the Catskill Park.
- Minnewaska State Park – a state park partly in the town.
- Napanoch – a hamlet north of Ellenville on Route 209.
- Pine Bush – a hamlet at the northeastern town line.
- Potterville – an abandoned community in the town.
- Rondout Reservoir – a reservoir partly in the northwestern part of the town.
- Sam's Point Preserve – a nature preserve southeast of Ellenville.
- Soyuzivka – a Ukrainian resort in Kerhonkson
- Spring Glen – a hamlet by the southern town line.
- Stony Kill Falls – an 87-foot-high waterfall.
- The Cape – a hamlet northwest of Ellenville on Route 52.
- Ulster Heights – a hamlet in the western part of the town. The Ulster Heights Synagogue was listed on the National Register of Historic Places in 2001.
- Wawarsing – this eponymous hamlet is on Route 209.
- Yagerville – an area near the Rondout Reservoir, too small to be a hamlet.

== Notable people ==
- Max Schubel, composer
- John Simon, record producer
- Joseph Terwilliger, geneticist

== See also ==
- Greenfield Park One Room Schoolhouse

== Bibliography ==
- Terwilliger, Katherine T. (1977). Wawarsing, Where the Streams Wind: Historical Glimpses of the Town. Ellenville, NY: Rondout Valley Publishing Company. OCLC 3480210.
