= Rondout, New York =

Village in New York, U.S.

Coordinates: 41°55′14″N 73°59′06″W

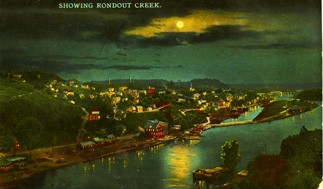
Rondout in the late 1800s at night looking over Rondout Creek to the north east.

Rondout (pronounced "ron doubt"; /ˈrɒndaʊt/) is a historic village and now district of the city of Kingston, New York in Ulster County, situated on the Hudson River at the mouth of Rondout Creek. Originally a maritime village, the arrival of the Delaware and Hudson Canal helped create a city that dwarfed nearby Kingston. Rondout became the third largest port on the Hudson River and merged with Kingston in 1872. It overlaps with the Rondout–West Strand Historic District.

== History ==
Rondout stands at the mouth of Rondout Creek, which empties into the Hudson through a large, protected tidal area. It was established by the Dutch in the seventeenth century as an Indian trading post. Furs brought from inland areas down the Rondout, Wallkill River and Esopus Creek were sent by boat down the Hudson River to New York City.

The name derives from the fort, or redoubt, that was erected near the mouth of the creek. The Dutch equivalent of the English word redoubt (meaning a fort or stronghold), is reduyt. In the Dutch records of Wildwyck (now Kingston, New York), however, the spelling used to designate this same fort is invariably Ronduyt during the earliest period, with the present form Rondout (often capitalized) appearing as early as November 22, 1666.

=== The D&H Canal ===
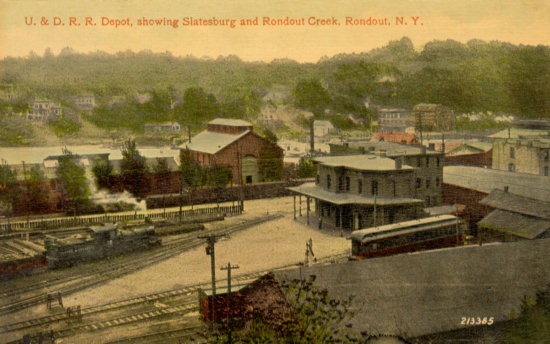
Ulster and Delaware Railroad depot in Rondout

As late as the 1820s, Rondout was a small hamlet. As the Philadelphia coal market was saturated with Lehigh coal, bringing the price down, William and Maurice Wurts developed the Delaware and Hudson Canal as a way to deliver their anthracite from Carbondale, Pennsylvania to New York City. After the opening of the canal in 1828, the area of Rondout rapidly transformed from farmland into a thriving maritime village. The last several miles of the canal, which linked coal mines in northeastern Pennsylvania to the Hudson River and markets beyond, followed Rondout Creek to reach the Hudson River. Irish laborers came to dig the canal and many of them stayed to work on it after its completion. Businessmen established stores to serve the workers. Steamboats, sloops, schooners, and barges loaded with passengers and cargo regularly left the port bound for New York City. New industries developed such as brick and cement manufacturing, bluestone shipping, and ice-making. As canal traffic increased, homes and commercial businesses were built along the slope upward from the Rondout Creek.

By 1840, the village had a population of fifteen hundred, two hundred residences, two churches, six hotels and taverns, twenty-five stores, three freighting establishments, a tobacco factory, a gristmill, four boat yards, two dry docks, and the office and dock of the Delaware and Hudson Canal Company.

=== Steamboat services, cement manufacturing and other developments ===
Rondout Creek was the home of the Cornell Steamboat Company tugboat fleet, the dominant towing company on the Hudson from 1880 to the 1930s. The company was started in 1847. At one time it had a fleet of as many as sixty-two tugboats towing barges of coal and many other materials on the Hudson River to New York and other ports. Eventually Cornell had a virtual monopoly of towing on the Hudson River and employed hundreds of workers on their boats and in their workshops along the Rondout Creek. By 1872 more than thirty steamboats were based in Rondout, many of which, as well as a large number of barges and sailing vessels, were engaged in the transportation of stone, coal, cement, brick, and ice. Steamboats such as the sidewheel "Queen of the River", Kingston's Mary Powell, regularly plied between Rondout, New York, and points on the river.

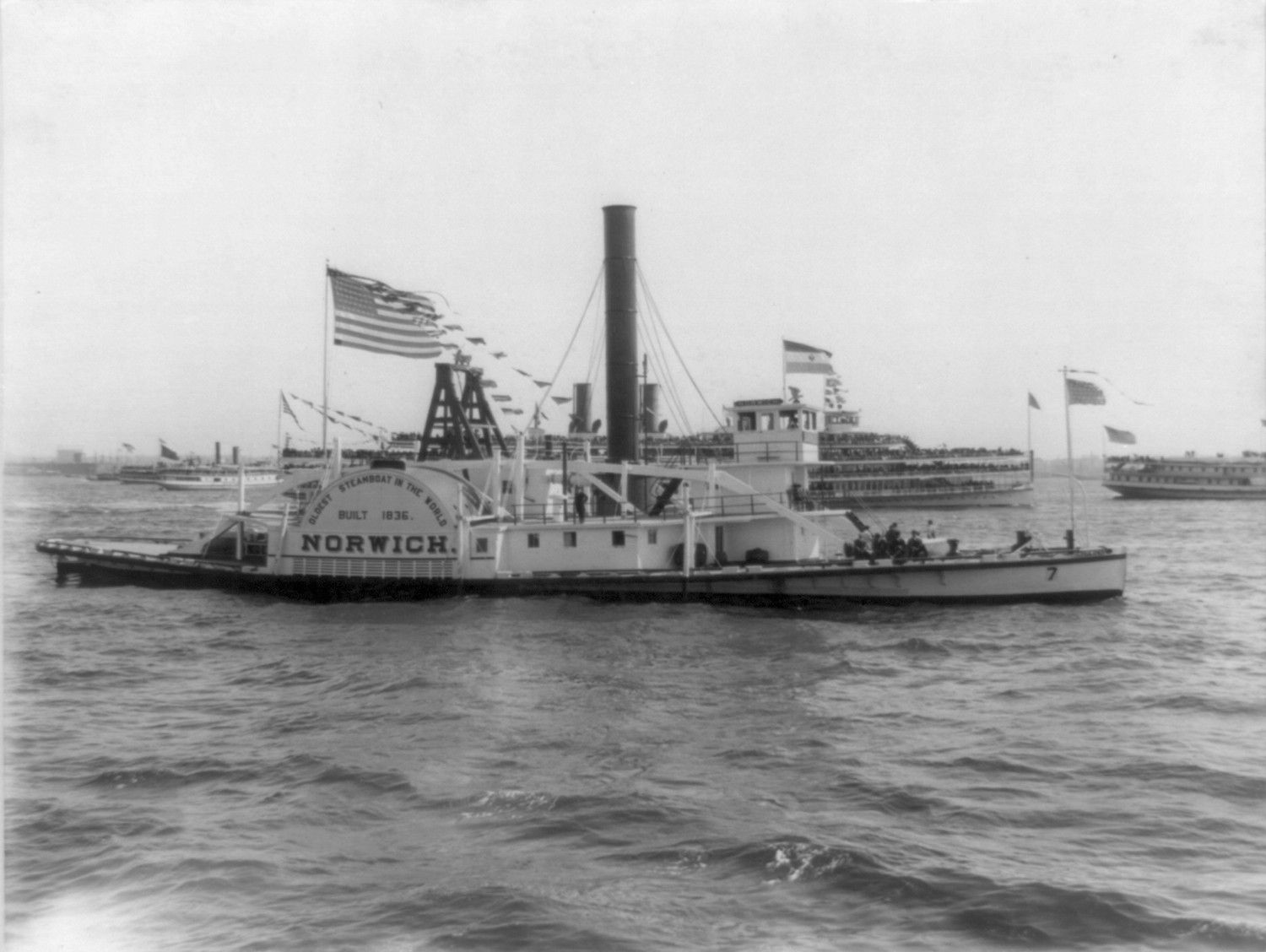
the steamboat Norwich

The little sidewheeler Norwich, (160 feet × 25'3", 255 gross tons), was built in New York in 1836 by Lawrence & Sneeden of New York for the New York and Norwich Steamboat Co. Named for the City of Norwich, Connecticut, she was not big enough to compete with the large steamboats coming into service on the sound, and was sold to the New York & Rondout Line for passenger and freight service on the Hudson. Converted to towboat service, in which she from 1850 to 1923, the Norwich was known as "the Ice King". She was unexcelled as an ice-breaker, opening up the channels in the spring. The Erie Railroad paid her to clear a passage through the ice for its barge and steamboat traffic from the rail terminal at Piermont to New York. Verplanck and Collyer, in Sloops on the Hudson, write that Capt. Jacob Dubois required one week to work the Norwich 20 miles through heavy ice to New York City from Piermont. One of the longest-lived steamboats, the Norwich worked the Hudson until 1917 and survived until 1924.

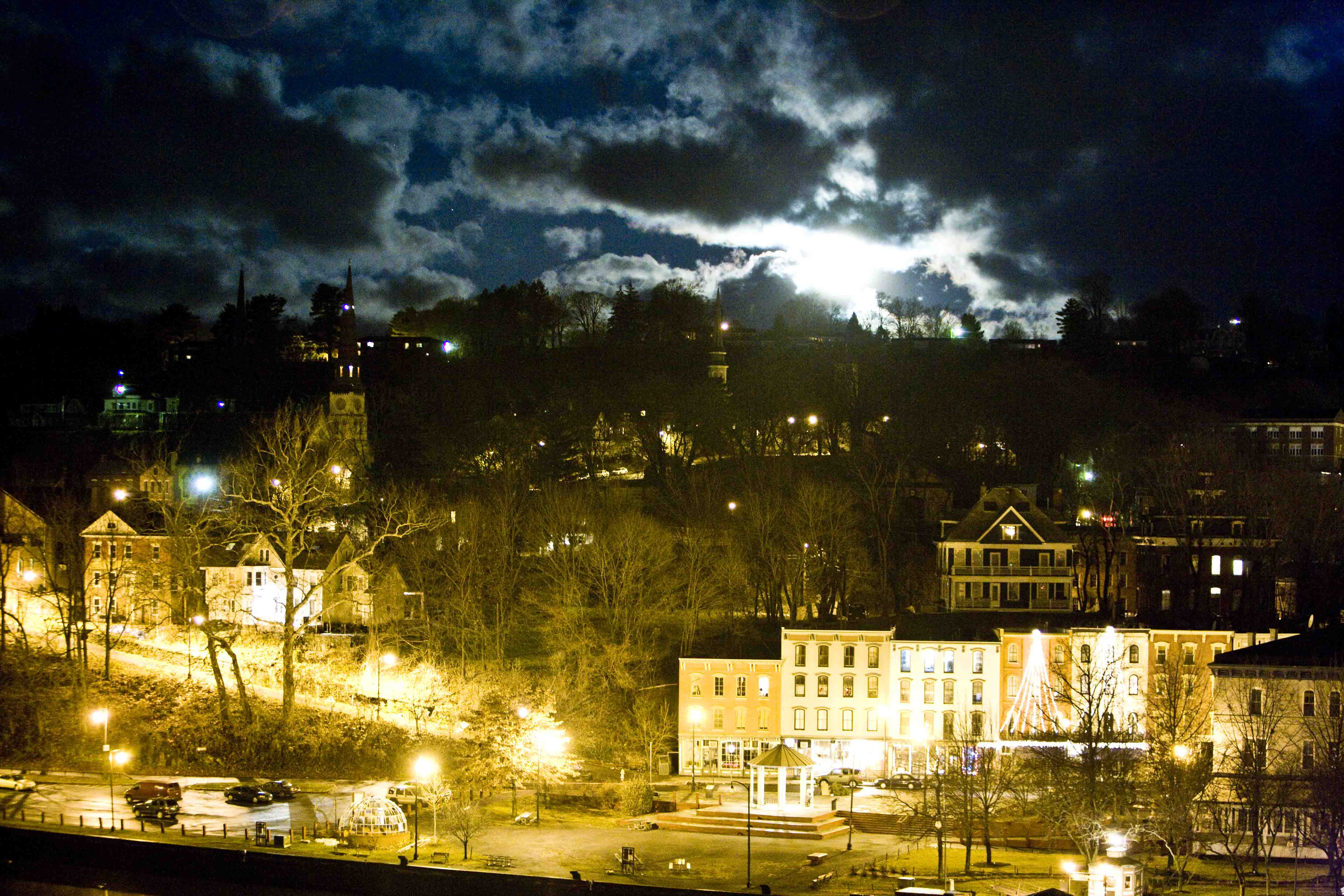
A view of The Strand in the old town of Rondout under a full moon

Prior to its incorporation, Rondout was known variously as "The Strand", "Kingston Landing" and "Bolton". "The Strand" is a Dutch derived reference to the beach once located on the north shore of the Rondout Creek. "Bolton" was used in honor a president of the Delaware and Hudson Canal Company. Incorporated on April 4, 1849, Rondout served as a Hudson River port for the city of Kingston located about a mile distant.

In 1851, German-born Jewish businessman Israel Sampson arrived in Rondout and built the Sampson Opera House at 1 Broadway. Sampson ran a successful clothing business out of the first floor, and the top floor housed the Opera House. In 1885, fire gutted the building, destroying the Opera House, which was never rebuilt. In the 20th century, a Kingston newspaper, The Daily Freeman, occupied the building until 1974. In 1854 George F. VonBeck built the Mansion House Hotel, hoping to capitalize on Rondout's location as a stopping-off place for steamboat and stagecoach passengers On lower Broadway, it was opposite the Samspon Opera House, and provided a place for touring performers to stay. Dr. Abraham Crispell, who treated patients during the cholera epidemic of 1849, had an office in the Mansion House Hotel.

According to Hamilton Child, the most important manufacturing establishment was The Newark Lime and Cement Manufacturing Company, which began operation in spring 1851. The company owned 250 acres including waterfront on the channel of the Rondout Creek. The Rondout Manufactory alone produced 227,516 barrels. The works consisted of twenty-one kilns for burning the stone, two mill buildings, four storehouses, capable of storing upwards of 20,000 barrels, a cooperage establishment, millwrights', wheelwrights', blacksmiths', and carpenters' shops, barns stables. Stone, from which the cement was made, was quarried from the hill immediately in the rear of the factory, and was obtained by tunneling and sinking shafts, from which extend galleries in the stratum of cement rock, which inclines to the north-west. An extensive system of railways transported the stone from the quarries to the top of the kilns, where it was burned by being mixed with culm or fine coal, and then passed by a series of descents through the various stages of manufacture till it arrived in barrels at the wharf ready for shipment. As the cement manufactured often exceeded 1,000 barrels per day, the deficiency in barrels was supplied from the stock accumulated during the season when navigation was closed, and the manufacture of cement necessarily suspended. The number of men employed varied from 250 to 300.

A steam ferry connected Rondout with the Hudson River Railroad across the river in Rhinecliff. A trolley connected Rondout with Kingston. It contained ten churches, viz., Methodist, Presbyterian, Baptist, Episcopal, Lutheran, two Roman Catholic and two Jewish; three banks, two newspaper offices, three public schools, several manufactories and about 10,000 inhabitants. That same year it merged with and became a part of the city of Kingston.

=== Blizzard of 1888 ===
The Blizzard of ‘88 was one of the worst storms to ever strike the eastern seaboard. It started on Sunday morning, March 11, 1888, and the storm continued to rage until Monday midnight. Although there were only about two or three feet of snow, gale force winds that reached 60 MPH left snowdrifts as high as 10 to 20 feet. During the storm, a rare “blowout tide” (extreme ebbs caused by strong offshore winds which drain inshore shallows – the opposite of a storm-surge) drained the Rondout Creek enough that boats were grounded on the creek bottom. The ferry boat was hard aground and the Norwich was keeled over to one side. The stage to Ellenville left the Rondout at the usual time but nothing was heard from the stage the next day. The only thing authorities could do was assume that the stage was stuck in the snow someplace and that the passengers were safe. The stage from Ellenville reached Hurley that Monday and stayed until the next day when the driver returned to Rondout with only one sleigh bob.

By the turn of the century it was more efficient and economical to ship coal by rail, and the seasonal canal became obsolete. Portland cement replaced blue stone in building and paving. As less material was shipped the port of Rondout declined.

The Kingston-Port Ewen Suspension Bridge at the foot of Wurts Street was completed in 1921. It crosses the Rondout Creek to link Rondout to Port Ewen. For decades, those who wished to cross the creek had to embark on a chain ferry named the Riverside, nicknamed the "Skillypot", a derivative of a Dutch word for tortoise.

Prosperity revived briefly with boatbuilding during World War II as three shipyards operated with large work crews building naval vessels.

Construction of the John T. Loughran Bridge over the Esopus Creek required the demolition of a few blocks of the West Strand neighborhood on the north side. This rallied preservationists to get the decaying area designated a historic district. A portion of Rondout's former town center has survived intact and is part of the Rondout-West Strand Historic District.

=== Religious establishments ===
==== St Mary's Catholic Church ====
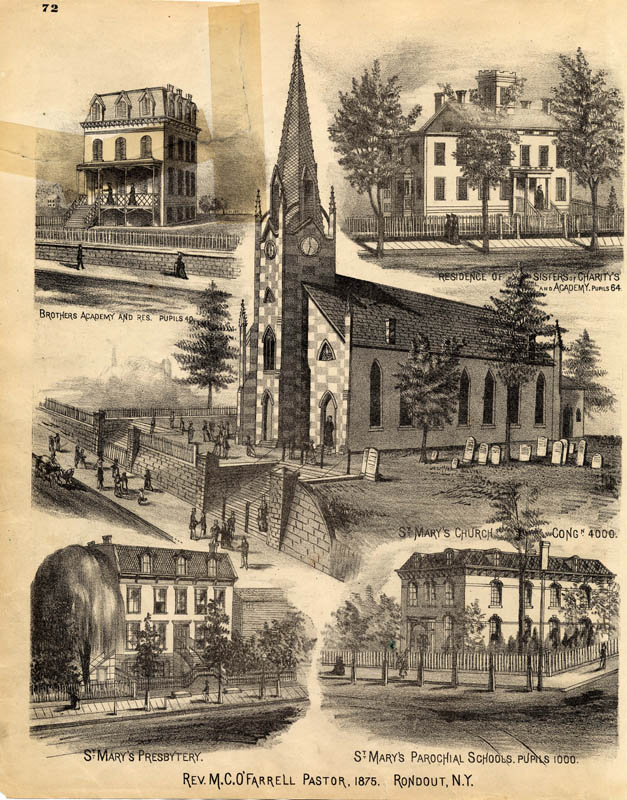
St. Mary's, Rondout

As early as 1835, Catholics who had gone to Rondout to work on the D&H Canal met to establish a church. They were assisted by the Irish Dominican Philip O'Reilly, who had been assigned by Bishop of New York John Dubois to develop parishes along the Hudson. Rondout was little more than a hamlet at this time and a priest would visit in any month that had five Sundays when Mass would be celebrated at a blind and sash factory on the corner of Mill and Division St. In 1837, Rondout was made a mission of the recently established St. Peter's in Poughkeepsie under Rev. John McGinnis. Most of the congregation were Irish immigrants who had come to Rondout to dig the D&H Canal. In 1839 Rev. John N. Smith became pastor at Poughkeepsie, also serving Saugerties and Rondout, where a small frame church was erected in 1840 on land purchased from Abraham Hasbrouck. Irish Catholic families in Rosendale and Stony Hollow were known to walk the eight or ten miles every Sunday to Mass at St. Mary's.

Smith was succeeded in 1842 by the first resident pastor, Father Myles Maxwell. In 1848, the cornerstone was laid for a new brick church. The frame building was left standing in the new church until shortly before its dedication in July 1849. Father Maxwell died on August 31, 1849; he was succeeded by the Irish Dominican Thomas Martin, who was pastor from November 1849 to January 1852. Father Martin attended mission churches in Rosendale, Stony Hollow, Port Ewen, Eddyville, Whiteport, and Saugerties.

Martin was succeeded by Rev. John Madden, who built a rectory. Father Maxwell was succeeded by Rev. Francis McNierny, and Rev. D.G. Durning. Felix Farrelly arrived as pastor in 1859. At the time of the Civil War, Father Farrelly did much to calm the violent protests by Irish Catholics against the draft. He established St. Mary's Academy, staffed by Sisters of Charity, and purchased the land for St. Mary's Cemetery. Farrelly Street is named after him. During his tenure, Stony Hollow was established as a mission, with Jockey Hill a station.

Father James Coyle succeeded Rev. Edward Briody as pastor in 1867. Coyle built a large parochial school on the corner of McEntee and Union (Broadway) Streets. This is now Kingston Catholic. The following year he founded St. Joseph's parish in Kingston. In 1874 Rev. M.C. O'Farrell built St. Colman's in East Kingston, which later merged with St. Catherine Laboure in Lake Katrine.

By 1907, St. Mary's had the distinction of having supplied more priests and sisters than any place in the archdiocese outside New York City. In 1913, the parish opened a new school building, designed by Arthur C Longyear, at 159 Broadway.

In 2013, St Mary's underwent a restoration of the stained glass windows. A Celtic cross, commemorating the Great Famine of Ireland and the great emigration from Ireland to the U.S. from 1845 to 1852, dominates the courtyard between the church and the rectory.

==== Holy Name of Jesus ====
Downstream of the village of Eddyville was the hamlet of Wilbur which had thriving industry in trimming and shipping of bluestone. In 1884, Rev. James Dougherty, pastor of St. Joseph, built a brick church at Wilbur. The people of Wilbur donated their labor in digging the foundation. Carpenters, masons, and painters also contributed. Material was close at hand in the brickyards. The church was dedicated on November 1, 1885. The parish church of the Holy Name of Jesus in Wilbur was founded as an independent parish in 1887, with the appointment of Father William J. Boddy as its first resident pastor. The Catholic population of Holy Name of Jesus parish in 1914 was 350. The parish also had a mission, the Church of the Sacred Heart, in Eddyville with a congregation of about 150. The parish of the Holy Name of Jesus on Fitch Street in Wilbur later merged with St. Mary's in Rondout.

==== St. Peter's ====
German immigrants first arrived in Rondout to work on the D&H Canal. St. Peter's parish was founded by Catholics of German origin when the first Mass was said by Rev. A. Hechinger in the basement of an unfinished church on Adams Street. Rev. Oswald Moosmüller O.S.B succeeded as pastor in 1859 and the completed church was dedicated by Archbishop John Hughes on April 20, 1860. Some years later the site of the old District School #7 on Wurts Street was purchased and a new Romanesque church was dedicated on May 26, 1872, by Archbishop John McCloskey. Father John Raufeisen built a rectory on the adjoining lot. St. Peter's Cemetery was opened in 1860.

The old church building was taken down to make way for the parish school. St. Peter's parochial school was established in 1858 and managed by layment until the arrival of the Sisters of Charity in 1877. They were replaced by the Sisters of Christian Charity in 1888. A new school was completed in 1912. In 1970 St. Peter's school combined with St. Mary's to form Kingston Catholic School. St. Peter's School building was subsequently purchased by Catholic Charities of Ulster County.

Father Raufeisen's successors were: Fathers Emil Stenzel (September 1876 to July 1877), Francis Siegelack (July 1877 to February 1878), Matthias Kuhnen (1888 to 1907), and Joseph F. Rummel.

St. Peter's had a mission station in Ruby, New York dedicated to St. Wendelinus. The congregation, of about sixty people, was largely of English and German descent. Responsibility for the mission church of St. Wendelinus was later transferred to the parish of St. Ann in Sawkill.

The church underwent a complete renovation for its Golden Jubilee in 1908. Up until the early 1900s sermons continued to be preached in German. Reflecting the city's changing demographics, in 2002 St. Peter's instituted a Hispanic ministry. In 2015 the St. Peter's parish and the parish of St. Mary/Holy Name merged.

==== Immaculate Conception ====
The first Polish people settled in Kingston in 1875. They attended St. Peter's Church. The Church of the Immaculate Conception was first organized in 1893 by Rev. Francis Fremel to serve members of the Polish community, whose numbers greatly increased in the early 1890s. Father Fremel spoke both German and Polish. At first services were held in an old building on Union Street. Father Fremel was succeeded by Rev. Francis Fabian, who built the church on Delaware Avenue in 1896. Rev. Fabian would later establish St. Joseph's in Poughkeepsie to serve the Polish people of that community. Members of the parish assisted the brick-layers in constructing the church and rectory. Immaculate Conception was dedicated by Archbishop Michael Corrigan in 1897. The parish school was built in 1907 and staffed by the Felician Sisters. Father Fabian also purchased the land for Mount Calvary Cemetery on Flatbush Avenue. Father Theodore Jozwiak succeeded as pastor in 1909.

The church bells were consecrated by Archbishop Patrick Joseph Hayes on June 20, 1920. Rev. Ignatius Bialdyga served as pastor from 1922 to 1928, followed by Rev. Francis Borowski from 1928 to 1937. Father Borowski was succeeded by Rev. Stanislaus Malinowski, who was followed by Rev. Joseph Sieczek. In 1946 the parish celebrated is Golden Jubilee. During WWII the parish instituted a novena to Our Lady of Victory for the protection of parishioners serving in the armed forces. After the war, it was substituted by a novena to Our Lady of Perpetual Help. A monument honoring those who served in the war was erected next to the church.

== Events ==
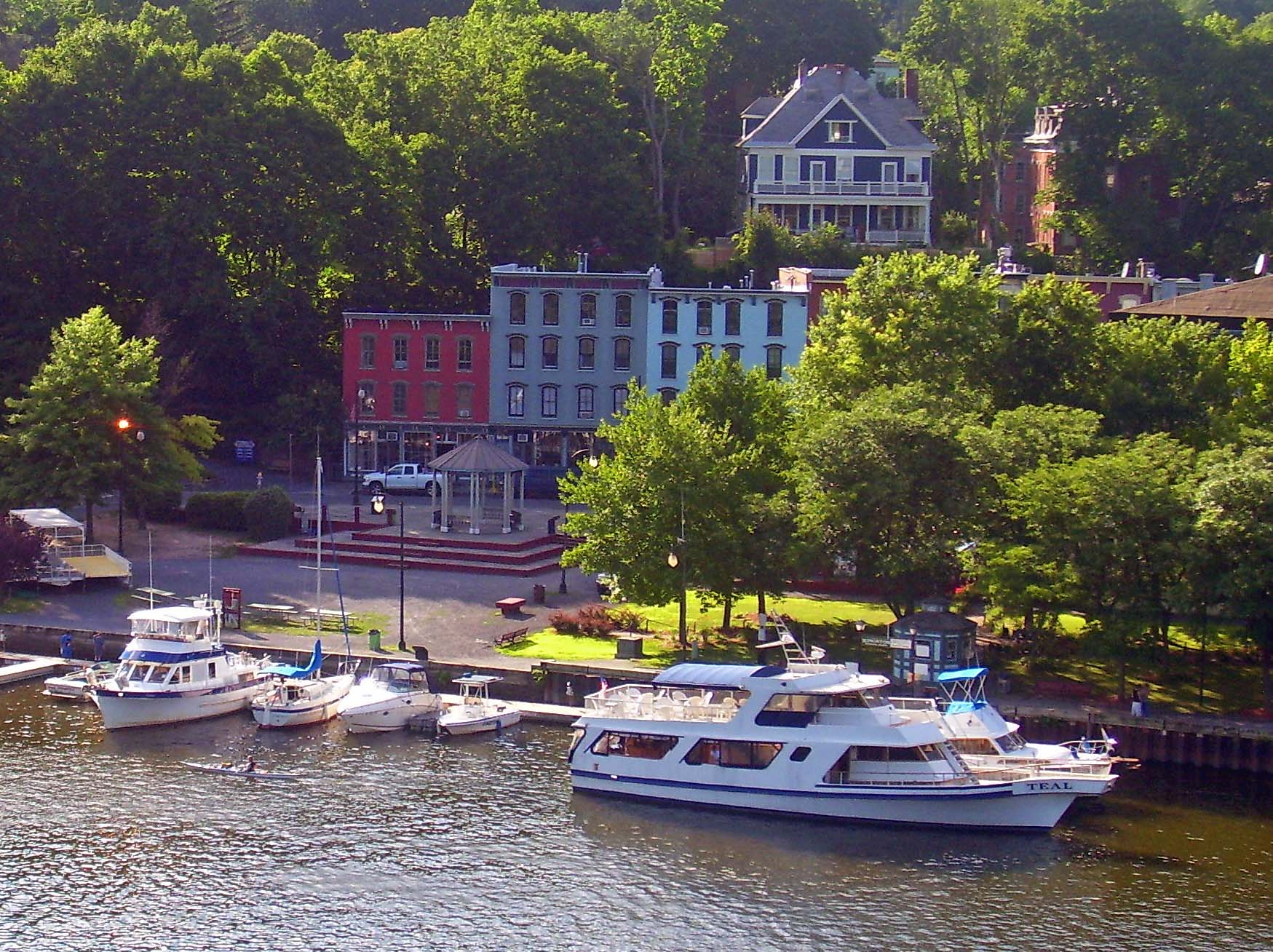
Rondout historic district

The City of Kingston holds many festivals in the Rondout neighborhood, including the "Artists' Soapbox Derby". Launched in 1995 by two local artists, Yourij ("George") and Nancy Donskoj, the Kingston Artists' Soapbox Derby is an annual event that combining soap box racers and works of art, although the Donskojs were divorced by 2011. Spectators can watch these sculptures race down Broadway to the Strand. Prizes are awarded in various categories, including "Most Awkward, Dizzying and Almost Hit a Child".

The "Hooley on the Hudson" is sponsored by the City of Kingston and the Ulster County Ancient Order of Hibernians. According to Jim Carey of the Order, "The Hooley is a traditional celebration after the September harvest, before winter sets in." Held every Labor Day weekend, the parade winds up at T.R. Gallo Memorial Park on the Strand. The Hooley is a festival that includes music, food and craft vendors, and step dancers.

== Places of interest ==
The Rondout Visitor Center is located at #20 Broadway, in the Rondout Waterfront. Rondout is home to a number of art galleries including the Trolley Museum of New York, the Kingston Museum of Contemporary Arts, the Arts Society of Kingston, and Deep Listening Space.

== Rondout-West Strand Historic District ==
The Rondout-West Strand Historic District constitutes the major portion of the extant nineteenth-century village of Rondout. It was added to the National Register of Historic Places in 1979. Due to the decline of business and building activities after the turn of the twentieth century, what remains still displays its nineteenth-century character. Although a large eastern portion of the Rondout area was demolished in the recent past, the section remaining illustrates what was a booming trading and industrial community. Though there has been some demolition with the district, the streetscapes generally retain their original mid-to-late nineteenth century integrity.

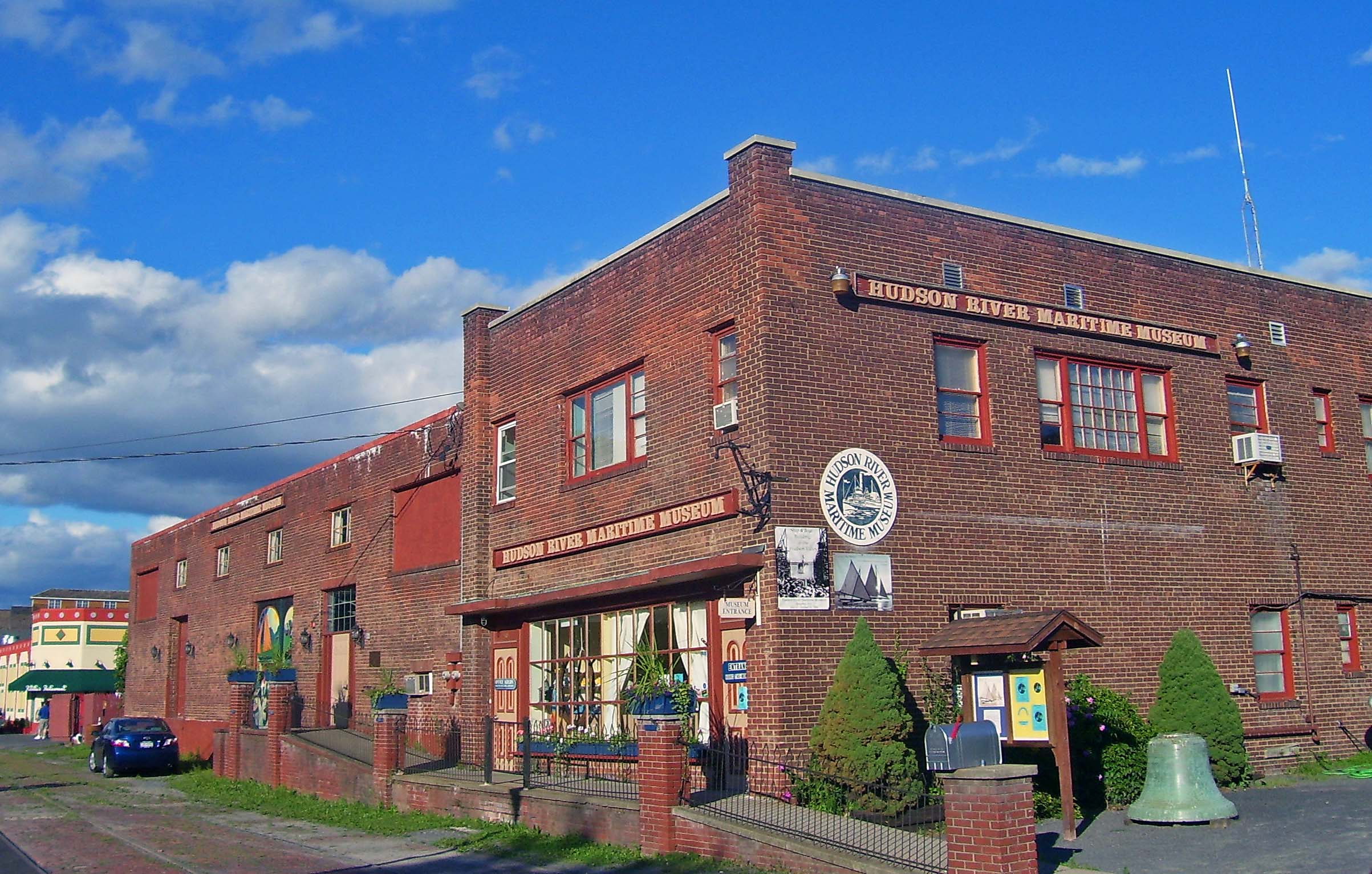
Hudson River Maritime Museum

The Hudson River Maritime Museum was founded in 1980 by steamboat and tugboat enthusiasts, as well as local citizens who wanted to preserve the shipping history of the Hudson River. Kingston was also an important stop for passenger steamboats bringing vacationers to the area, many of whom traveled on to the Catskills. It is located at 50 Rondout Landing at the foot of Broadway along Rondout Creek in the city's old waterfront. The Clearwater has its winter home port here and visits frequently as do many historic reproduction vessels such as the Onrust and the Half Moon.

In the summer of 2014 the Irish Cultural Center Hudson Valley was raising funds to complete renovation of the old headquarters of the D&H Canal Corp on Abeel Street into an Irish Cultural Center. According to representatives of the ICCHV, the site is important to the Irish in the Hudson Valley, as the area was once dubbed “Little Dublin” because of the laborers who built the canal and stayed to work on it.

== Gallery ==
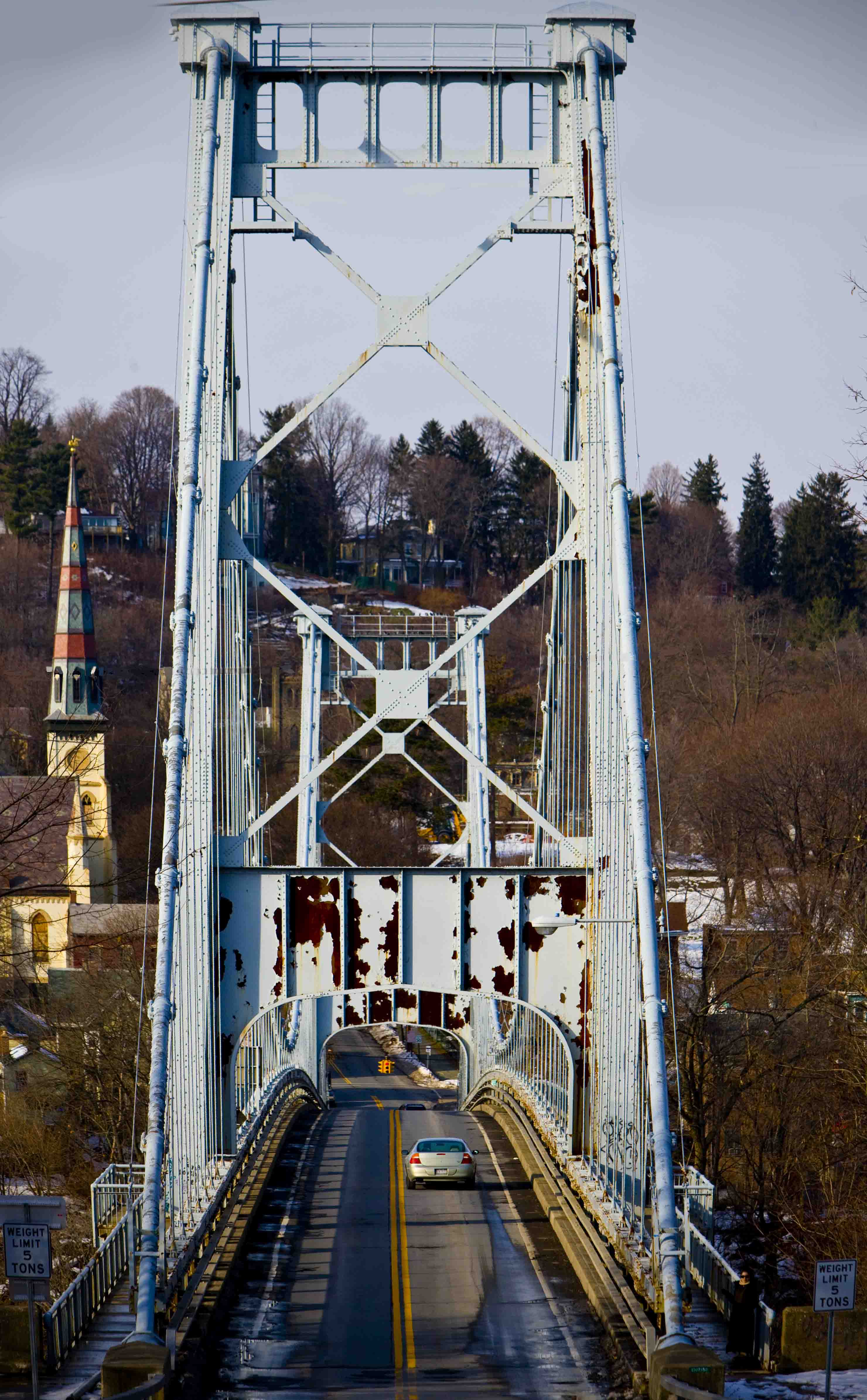
The Wurts street Bridge (a.k.a. Kingston-Port Ewen Suspension Bridge)

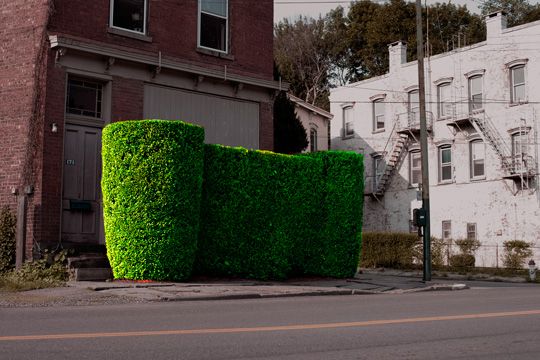
A living sculpture made and maintained by a resident artist

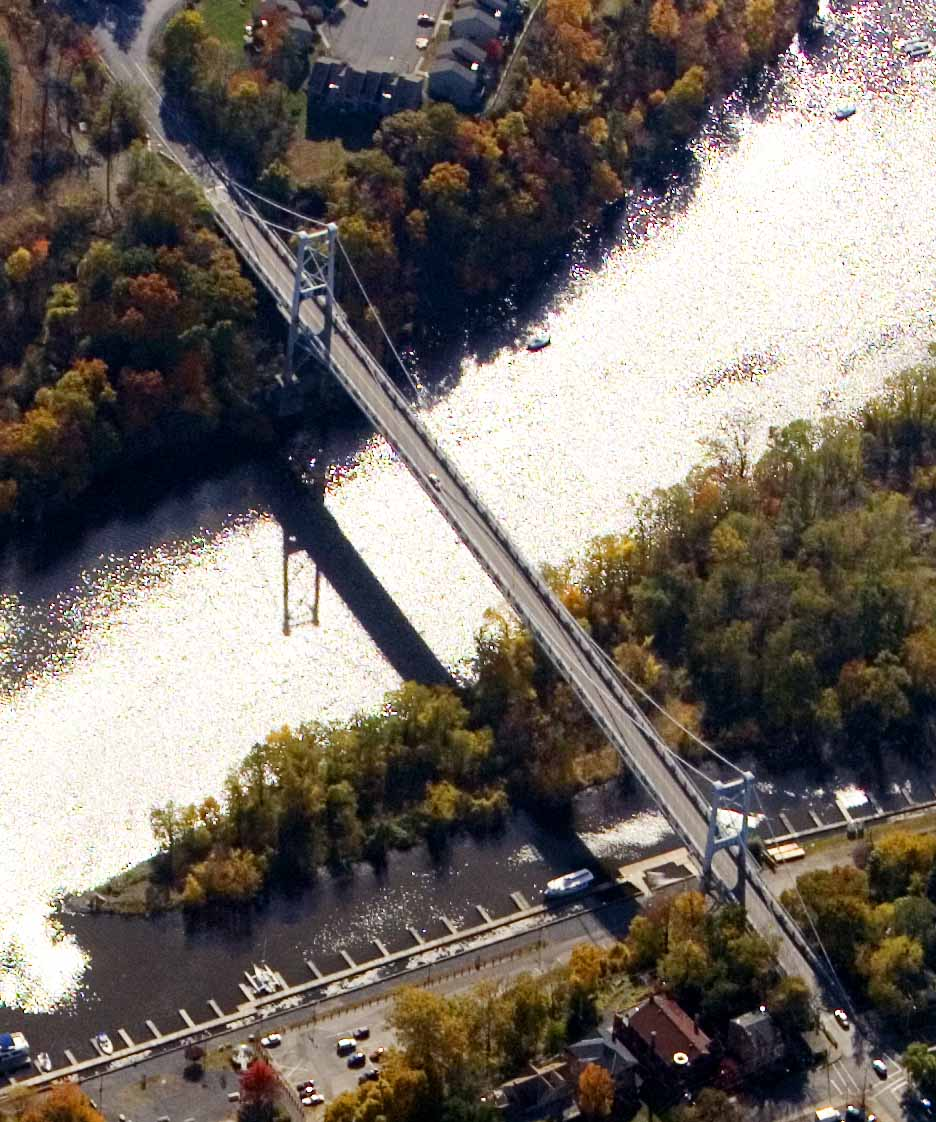
The Wurts Street Bridge from above (P.Joffe)

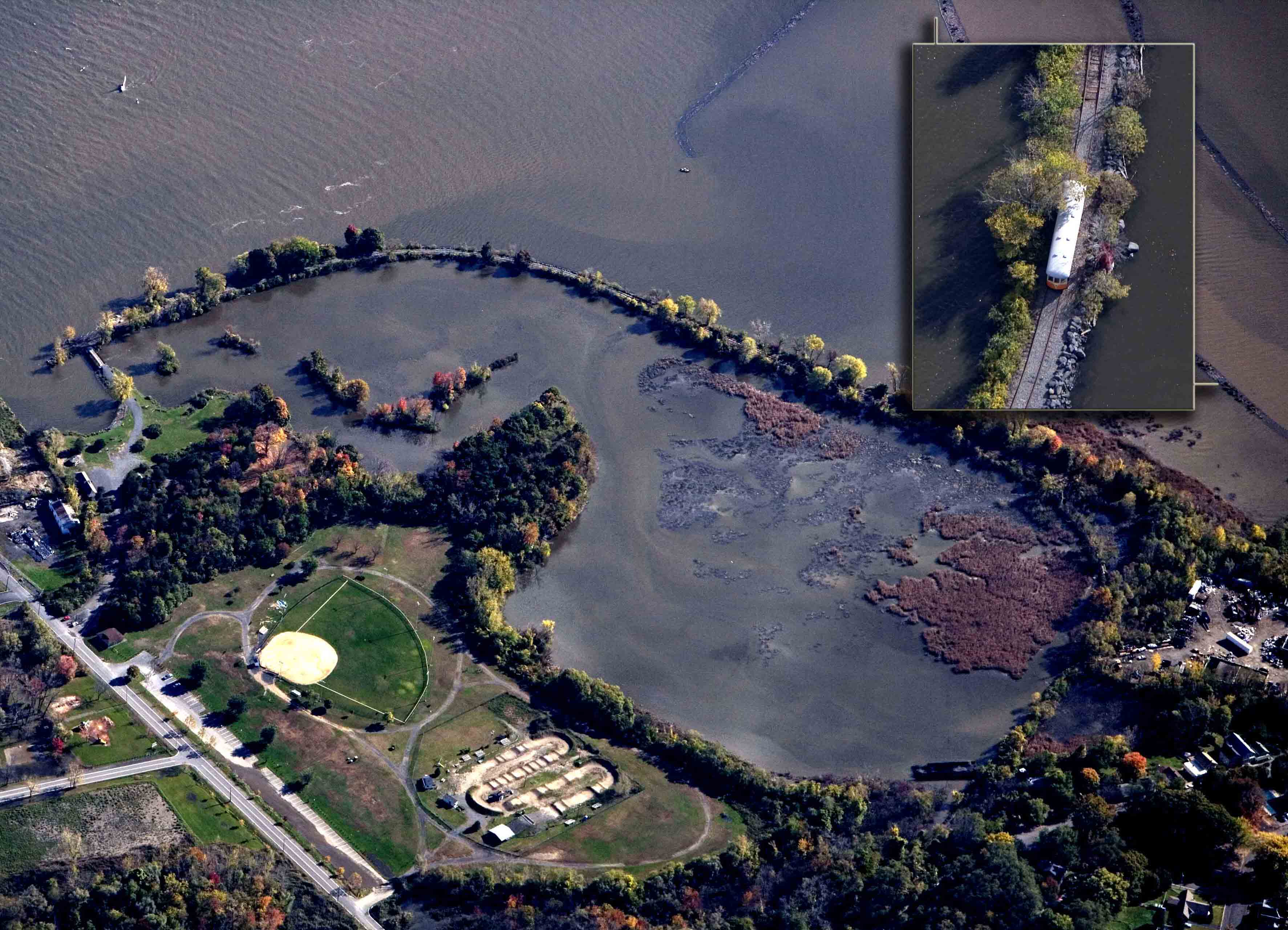
Kingston point, part of the former town of Rondout, and the trolley

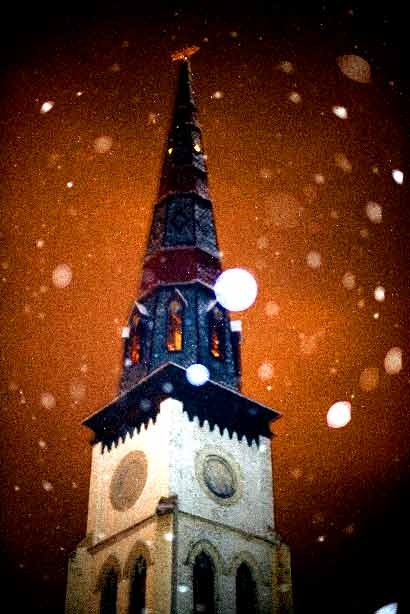
A steeple restored in 2006 on Wurts Street in Rondout

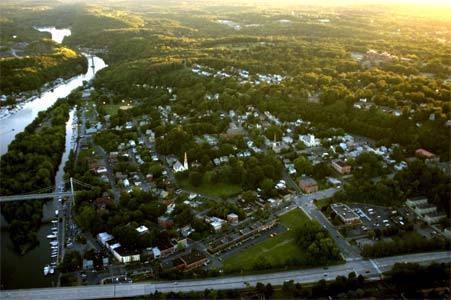
Rondout and Rondout Creek seen from the east (2005)
