= List of crossings of Rondout Creek =

This is a list of crossings of Rondout Creek, a tributary of the Hudson River in Ulster and Sullivan counties in New York, USA.

Crossing	Carries	Location	Coordinates
John T. Loughran Bridge	US 9W	Kingston – Port Ewen	41°55′04″N 73°58′54″W
Kingston–Port Ewen Suspension Bridge	Wurts Street	Kingston – Port Ewen	41°54′58″N 73°59′03″W
	NY 213	Esopus-Ulster	41°53′42″N 74°01′08″W
	I-87(New York State Thruway)	Rosendale	41°51′08″N 74°03′34″W
	NY 32 / NY 213	Rosendale	41°50′46″N 74°04′28″W
Rosendale trestle	Wallkill Valley Rail Trail	Rosendale	41°50′36″N 74°05′18″W
	NY 213	Rosendale	41°50′24″N 74°06′23″W
	Former Delaware and Hudson Canal aqueduct	High Falls	41°49′44″N 74°07′36″W
	NY 213	High Falls	41°49′44″N 74°08′02″W
	CR 6 (Kyserike Road)	Rochester	41°47′45″N 74°10′13″W
	CR 27 (Main Street)	Accord	41°47′19″N 74°13′53″W
	US 44 / NY 55	Kerhonkson	41°46′12″N 74°18′41″W
	Berme Road	Wawarsing	41°45′47″N 74°20′02″W
	Jenny Brook Road	East Wawarsing	41°45′01″N 74°21′01″W
	Port Ben Road	Napanoch	41°44′36″N 74°21′59″W
	US 209	Napanoch	41°44′18″N 74°22′37″W
	NY 55	Napanoch	41°44′46″N 74°23′02″W
	NY 55	Napanoch	41°45′26″N 74°22′52″W
	Sportsmans Road	Town of Wawarsing	41°46′24″N 74°24′02″W
	NY 55	Lackawack	41°47′31″N 74°24′51″W
Merriman Dam		Lackawack	41°47′57″N 74°25′46″W
	NY 55A	Town of Neversink	41°51′35″N 74°30′27″W
	East Mountain Road	Town of Neversink	41°51′56″N 74°29′15″W
	CR 153 (Sundown Road)	Sundown	41°53′16″N 74°27′57″W
	Balace Road	Sundown	41°53′51″N 74°27′54″W
	State camping area access road	Bull Run	41°54′37″N 74°29′07″W
	CR 42 (Long Path)	Bull Run	41°54′59″N 74°26′09″W
	CR 42 (Peekamoose Road)	Peekamoose Lake	41°55′36″N 74°23′04″W
