= Hudson River Maritime Museum =

Museum in Kingston, New York, United States

Coordinates: 41°55′7.56″N 73°58′52.32″W

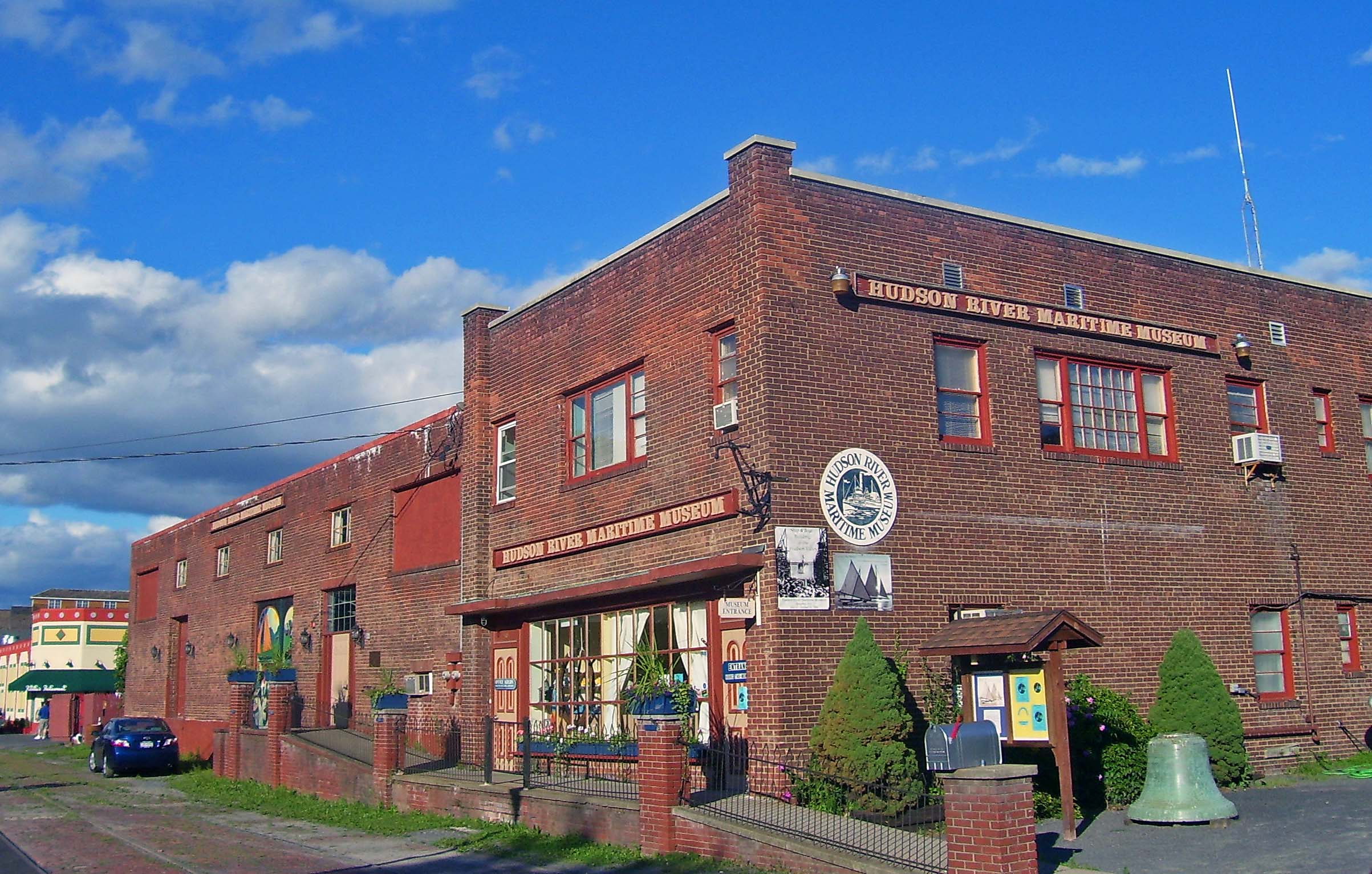
- Established: 1980
- Location: Kingston, NY, United States
- Type: non-profit: history, transportation
- Visitors: 20,000
- Director: Lisa Cline
- Curator: Allynne Lange
- Website: http://www.hrmm.org

The Hudson River Maritime Museum is a maritime museum dedicated to the Hudson River.

It is located at 50 Rondout Landing at the foot of Broadway in Kingston, New York, United States, along Rondout Creek in the city's old waterfront, just east of the John T. Loughran Bridge. The acronym HRMM is often used to refer the Hudson River Maritime Museum in publications.

Its collections are devoted to the history of shipping, boating and industry on the Hudson and its tributaries, such as the Rondout, where Kingston grew prosperous early in the 19th century as the northern end of the Delaware and Hudson Canal. The city was the busiest port between New York City and Albany.

The museum was founded in 1980 by local Hudson River enthusiasts, but did not move to its present property, an old boat shop, until 1983. Its exhibits include various small craft, artifacts of river steamships such as the Mary Powell, a research library, ice-harvesting tools and maps, paintings and sketches from past eras. The 1898 steam tugboat Mathilda is displayed in the yard next to the museum. In the summer months boat trips are available to nearby Rondout Lighthouse, where the creek drains into the Hudson. Boats putting in at the dock range from privately owned pleasure craft to oceangoing cruise liners. The Hudson River Sloop Clearwater has its winter home port here and visits frequently as do many historic reproduction vessels such as the Onrust and the Half Moon. As well as having the ability to accommodate deep draft vessels at their docks the museum provides free docking for canoes and kayaks.

The Hudson River Maritime Museum is home to the Kingston High School Crew Team, the Rondout Rowing Club and the Kingston Sailing Club. The museum is a membership supported organization and sponsors festivals and events including the Antique and Classic Boat Society Boat Show, Hudson River Days with music, crafts and displays, the "Follow the River" Lecture Series, Cinema Sundays and Family Days.

HRMM opened the Wooden Boat School in 2016 and the Sailing & Rowing School in 2017.

== See also ==
- List of maritime museums in the United States
- List of museum ships
