= Rondout Creek =

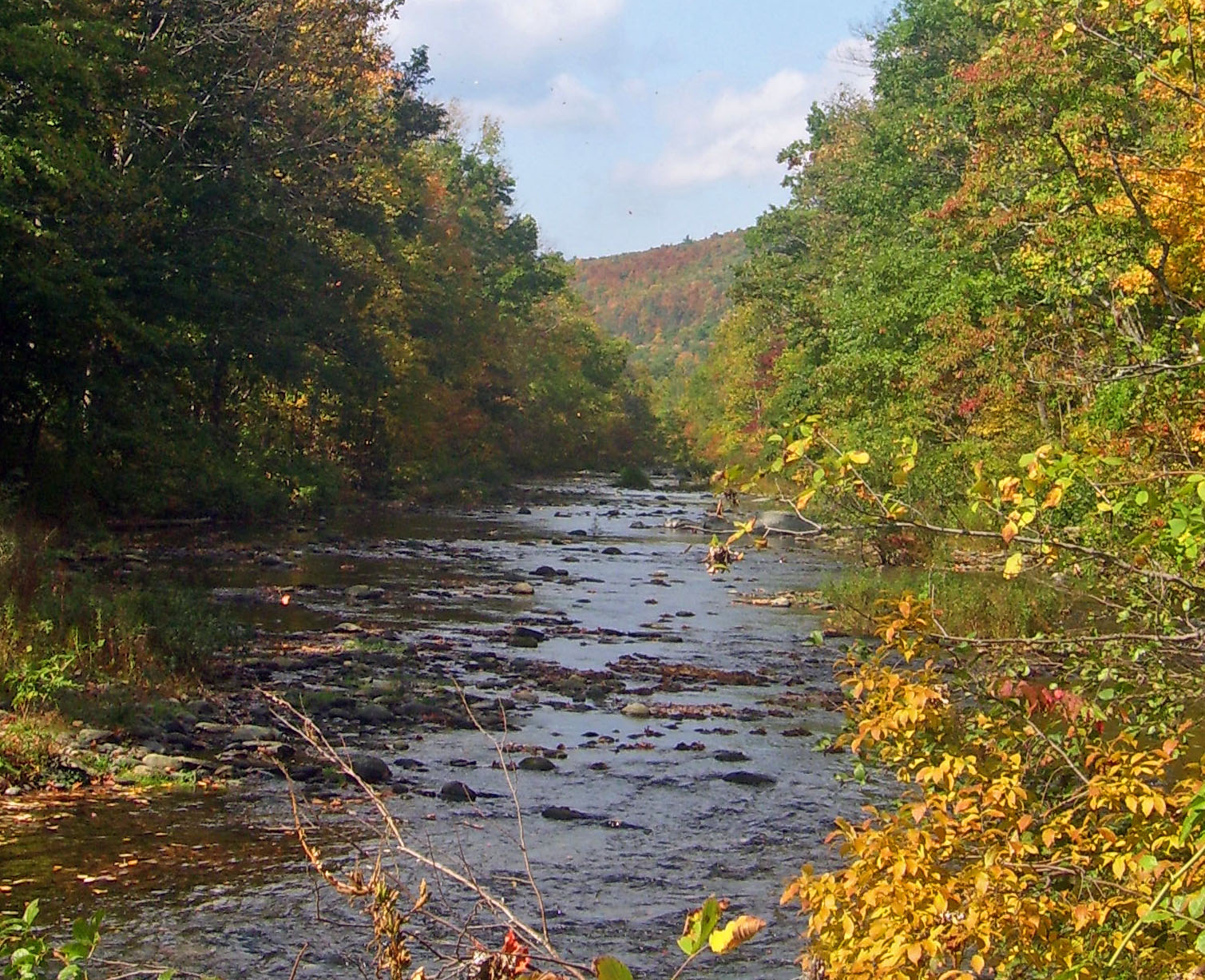
- Rondout Creek at the eastern edge of the Catskills, between Napanoch and Rondout Reservoir

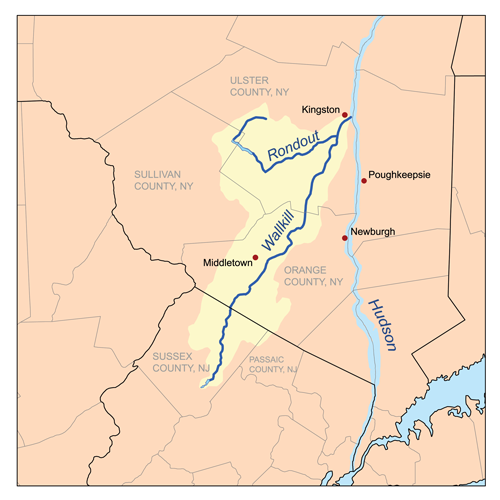
- Rondout/Wallkill watersheds

Location
- Country: United States
- State: New York
- Region: Catskills
- Counties: Ulster, Sullivan
- Municipality: Towns of Olive, Denning, Neversink Wawarsing, Marbletown, Rochester, Rosendale, Esopus, Ulster

Physical characteristics
- Source: Rocky Mountain
  - location: Olive
  - coordinates: 41°58′17″N 74°21′56″W
  - elevation: 2,980 ft (910 m)
- Mouth: Hudson River
  - location: Kingston
  - coordinates: 41°55′12″N 73°57′46″W
  - elevation: 0 ft (0 m)
- Basin size: 1,100 sq mi (2,800 km^{2})
- Discharge
  - average: 1,600 cu ft/s (45 m^{3}/s)
  - maximum: 35,000 cu ft/s (990 m^{3}/s)

Basin features
- Tributaries
  - left: Ver Nooy Kill, Rochester Creek
  - right: Coxing Kill, Wallkill River

Rondout Creek is a 63.3-mile-long (101.9 km) tributary of the Hudson River in Ulster and Sullivan counties, New York, United States. It rises on Rocky Mountain in the eastern Catskills, flows south into Rondout Reservoir, part of New York City's water supply network, then into the valley between the Catskills and the Shawangunk Ridge, where it goes over High Falls and finally out to the Hudson at Kingston, receiving along the way the Wallkill River.

The name of Rondout Creek comes from the fort, or redoubt, that was erected near its mouth. The Dutch equivalent of the English word redoubt (meaning a fort or stronghold) is reduyt. In the Dutch records of Wildwyck, however, the spelling used to designate this same fort is invariably Ronduyt during the earliest period, with the present form rondout (often capitalized) appearing as early as November 22, 1666.

The Rondout Creek became economically important in the 19th century when the Delaware and Hudson Canal followed closely alongside it from Napanoch to the village of Rondout, now part of Kingston, which grew rapidly as the canal's northern port. Today it is important not only for the reservoir, but for the fishing and other recreational opportunities it provides.

Due to the Wallkill, it drains a vast area stretching over 1,100 square miles (2,850 km^{2}) all the way down to Sussex County, New Jersey. The high mountains around its upper course and the reservoir, which collects water from three others, also add to its flow.

== Course ==
The Rondout goes through several different stages because of the changes in surrounding geography and past development, such as the canal and reservoir, that has drawn on its waters. Its headwaters, above the reservoir, are a typical mountain stream. Below the reservoir it remains fairly rocky but widens into the floor of a narrow valley. At Napanoch, where it turns northeast and receives its first significant tributary, the Ver Nooy Kill, it becomes wider, as does the valley it drains, and deeper.

North of the Shawangunks, where the Wallkill trickles down from Sturgeon Pool, it is wide enough to be referred to as the Rondout River at some points. At Creeklocks, the former northern outlet of the canal, it becomes wide and deep enough to be navigable, and several marinas line the banks of the stream, now more than 100 feet (30 m) wide, at Kingston just above its mouth.

=== Catskills and headwaters ===
Rising below the col between Rocky Mountain and Balsam Cap, the Rondout Creek flows generally southerly down the slopes of Rocky Mountain into a narrow valley, receiving tributary Picket Brook on the left and three unnamed streams from the slopes of Peekamoose Mountain to the right. A mile or two from its source, it reaches some private lands and its first road, Peekamoose Road (Ulster County 42). It has dropped 1,440 feet (440 m) in its first two miles. It turns to the southwest to follow a wider valley, known informally as Peekamoose Gorge. Most of the land surrounding the creek is part of New York's Forest Preserve, "forever wild" and thus undeveloped. The rocky stream boasts several popular swimming holes, one of which is known as Blue Hole for the greenish tone of the deep water within. South of the small outlet stream from Peekamoose Lake, it is crossed and then followed by Peekamoose Road, which at first runs high above the creek but then close by it.

Along here it receives several tributaries from the right — Buttermilk Falls Brook, with its eponymous waterfall near its mouth, High Falls Brook and Bear Hole Brook — most of them rising, like the Rondout itself, in the Slide Mountain Wilderness Area to the west. To the east is another Forest Preserve management unit, the Sundown Wild Forest. Some unnamed tributaries come from here. Because of the protected areas on both sides of the creek and the ease of public access, this area has become one of the Catskills' popular trout streams, and fly-fishermen can be seen here during the season.

It crosses under Peekamoose Road, here also carrying the Long Path hiking trail, again just north of a popular camping area in the small Peekamoose Wild Forest, and then passes the hamlet of Sundown and widens slightly as a floodplain develops alongside. The land along the creek is now largely in private hands, and there is little public access to it as it crosses into Sullivan County.

=== Reservoir to Napanoch ===
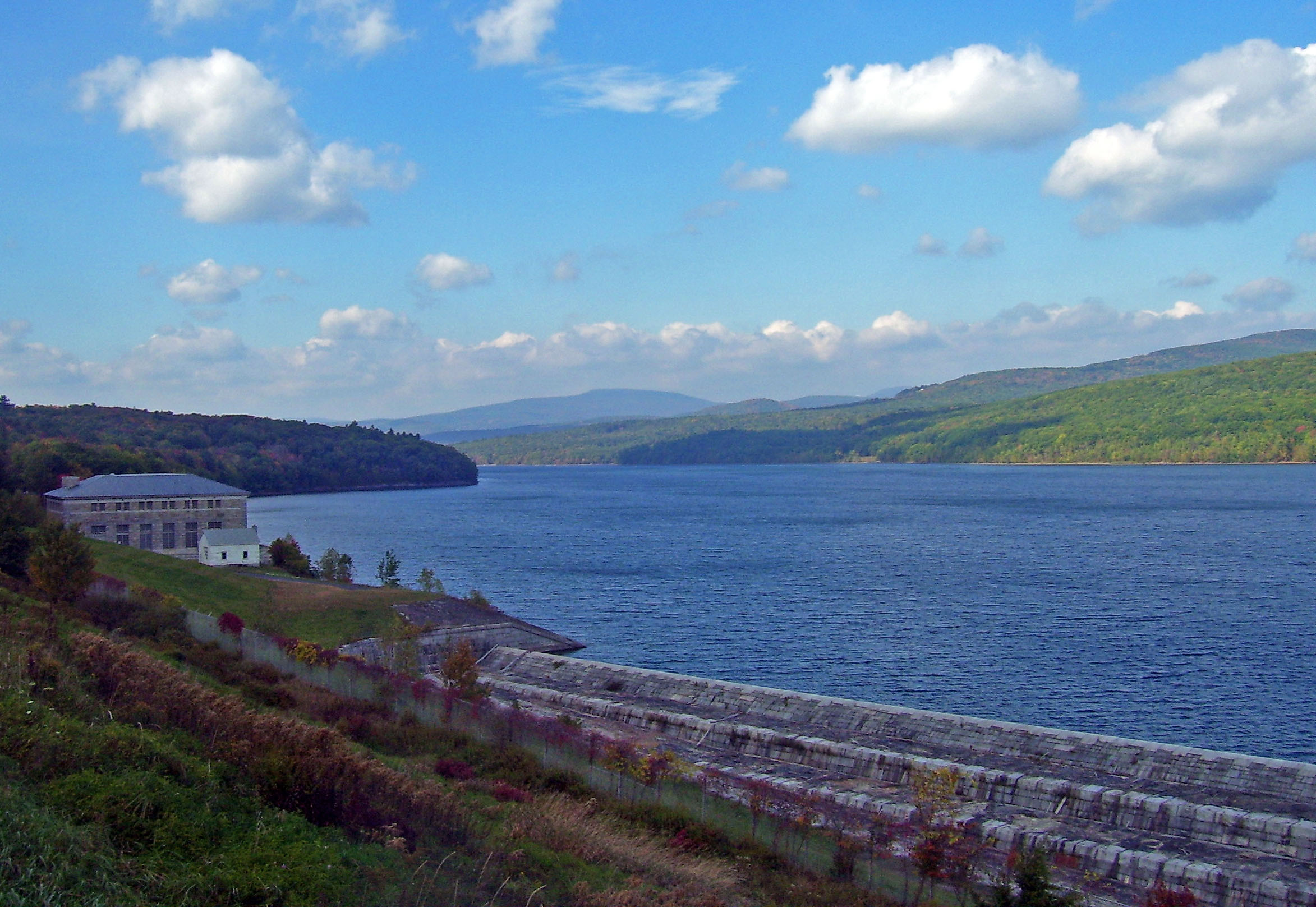
Rondout Reservoir

After crossing under NY 55A, it widens into the Rondout Reservoir just below Grahamsville and begins flowing more to the east-southeast. Routes 55 and 55A bracket the reservoir to the south and north respectively. One-third of the way along the reservoir's 9-mile (14 km) length, it crosses back into Ulster County. Now at an elevation of 840 feet (260 m), the creek resumes at the site of the former hamlet of Lackawack, leaving the Catskill Park, now headed eastwards, in a rocky, wider streambed through some slightly more development.

It follows closely alongside Route 55, deviating from it only when it turns north to Honk Lake, another impoundment. Past here it crosses under 55 again and comes into Napanoch. After crossing under US 209 and receiving the Ver Nooy Kill it bends northeast, paralleling the Shawangunk Ridge and the edge of the Catskill Plateau.

=== Rondout Valley ===
The creek, here wider and deeper, forms the bed of a widening valley as it continues northeast past Eastern Correctional Facility, where the first remnant of the canal, an empty ditch next to an old railroad station, can be found alongside. The creek continues towards Kerhonkson, where Route 55 and US 44 cross over. US 209 continues paralleling the Rondout towards High Falls, as it begins to curve to the east around the northern end of the ridge.

Here, it goes over the spectacular waterfall that gives the community its name, just below NY 213. These were the subject of controversy in recent years, since they were considered both a popular swimming hole and an attractive nuisance. The local fire department, which owned the land, had to sell it to keep its liability insurance premiums affordable, and the new owner has posted the property for the same reason.

=== Lower Rondout and Kingston ===
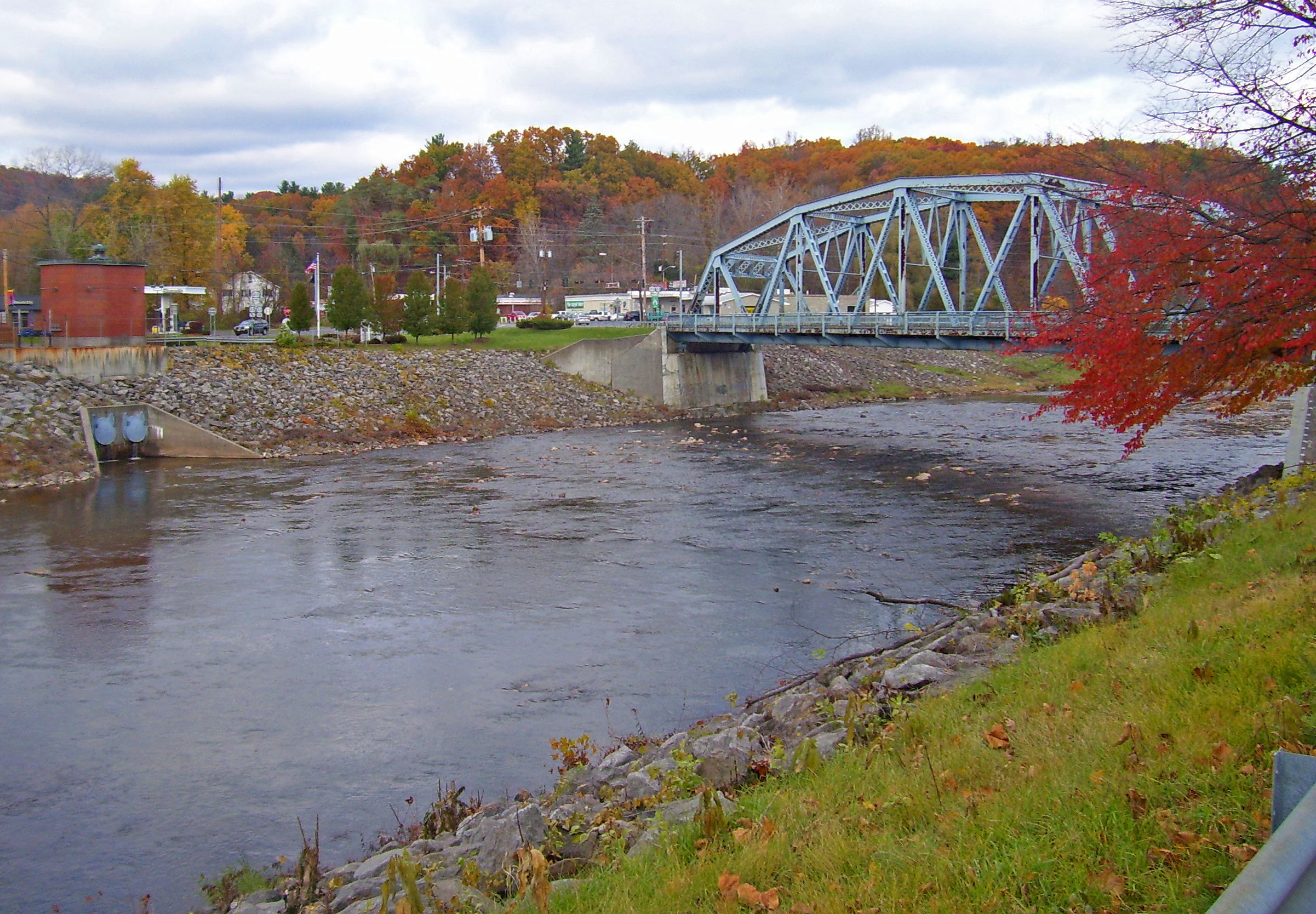
New York State routes 32 and 213 cross the Rondout, in a flood-control channel, at Rosendale

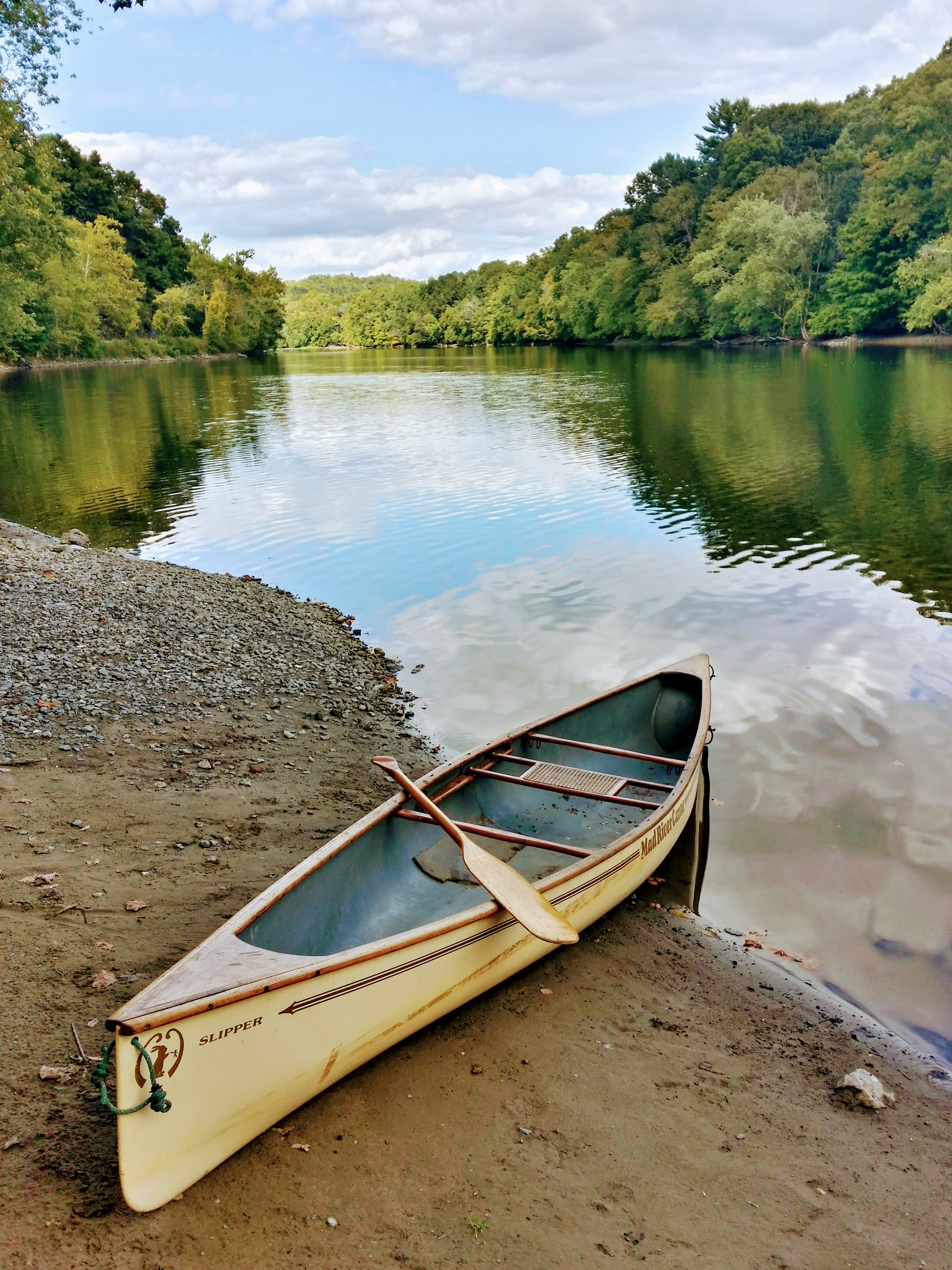
A canoe on Rondout Creek

Around the north end of the Shawangunks, it receives as tributaries many of the streams of the Minnewaska State Preserve: Peters Kill, Stony Kill and Coxing Kill. It begins to curve more to the east again. Route 213 replaces Route 209 as the Rondout's paralleling road, with the canal's empty ditch running next to both along the way to Rosendale, the next settlement, which grew up around the canal and, later, a local cement industry that used the creek to get its product to market.

Here it crosses under Route 213 and NY 32 in a gravel-lined flood control channel, but returns to a more natural bed shortly afterwards to flow beneath the New York State Thruway. In the wooded areas east of the Thruway, the Wallkill River, its flow attenuated by Sturgeon Pool just upriver, joins in from the south. The Rondout turns north, then east again, crossing Route 213 again. At Creeklocks the last lock and the end of the canal are still visible.

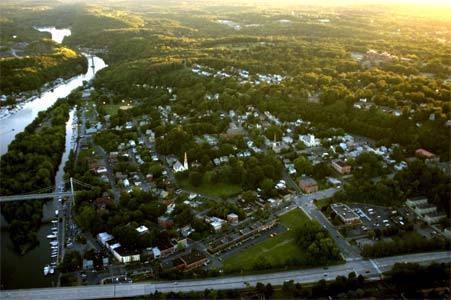
Rondout at Kingston (formerly Rondout, New York) seen from the west just before it intersects the Hudson River in 2005

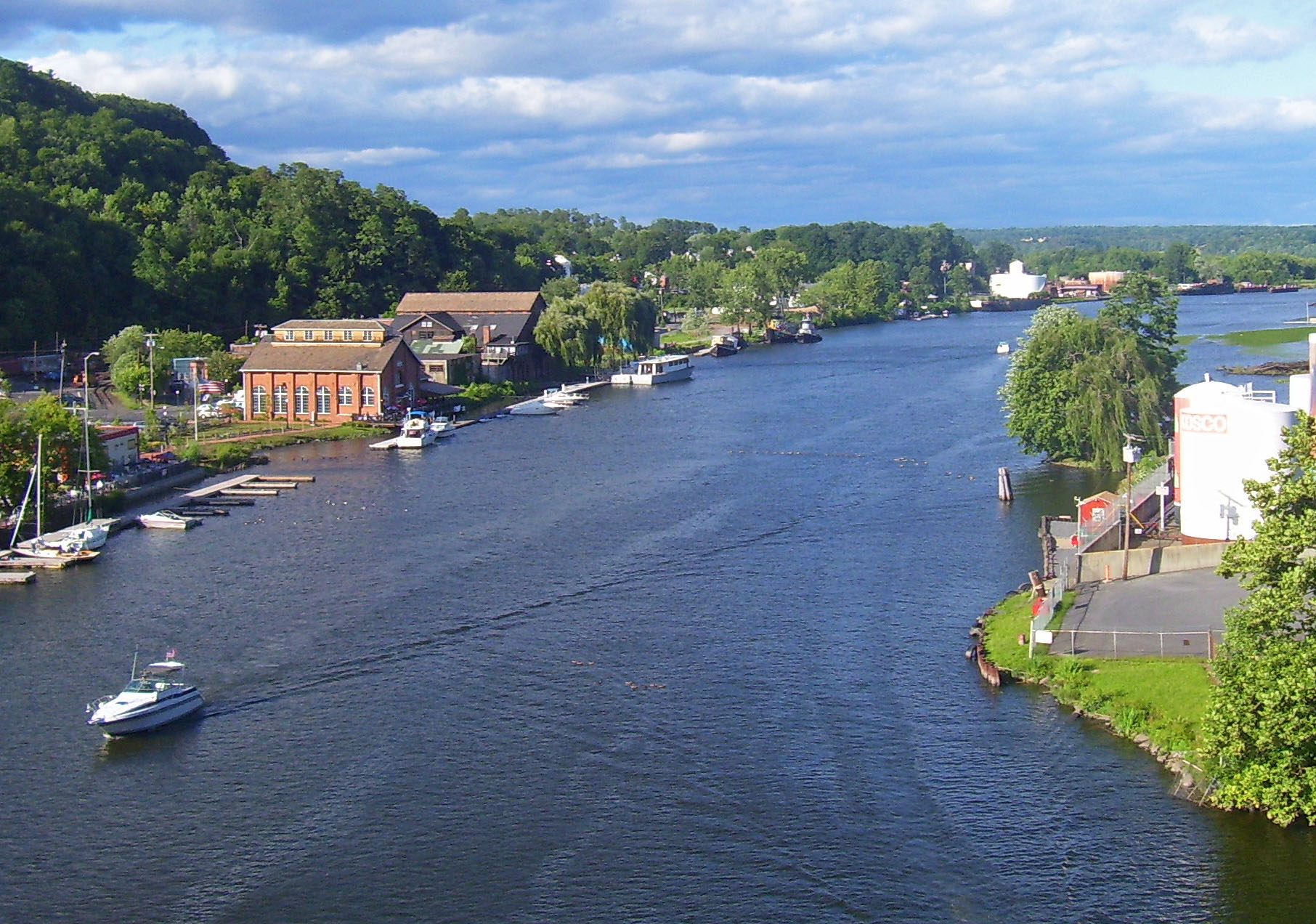
Rondout just above its outlet at Kingston

In Kingston itself it widens and flows under a pair of bridges, the historic Kingston–Port Ewen Suspension Bridge, which carried US 9W until the construction of the neighboring John T. Loughran Bridge. The city's West Strand neighborhood along the waterfront has been rejuvenated in recent years and many boats can be seen moored at docks here on summer weekends. Old shipbuilders' factories line the northern bank, and one of them has been converted into the Hudson River Maritime Museum. After a slight curve through swampier, less developed lowlands in the Kingston Point neighborhood, the Rondout empties into the Hudson at Rondout Lighthouse, just opposite Rhinecliff.

== History ==
=== Colonial era ===
The early Dutch settlers realized the value of the creek for their colonial ambitions. However, the contention that a trading post or fort was established at the mouth of the Rondout in the early part of the 17th century is thoroughly debunked in Marc B. Fried's The Early History of Kingston and Ulster County, NY, pp. 3–14 and 155–61. The first non-Native structure at this location was undoubtedly the house of settler Christoffel Davits in 1653, and a fort was built here by the colonial government in 1660. The local Native Americans likewise frequented the area. In 1652, an Englishman, Thomas Chambers, became the first to acquire a land deed from the Indians, nearby, along the Esopus Creek (which has a vast expanse of good farmland), and thus began the genesis of present-day Kingston. The Rondout's role in the area's early settlement was as a port for the settlement that was made along the Esopus Creek [The Early History of Kingston, chapter 2]

=== Canal era ===
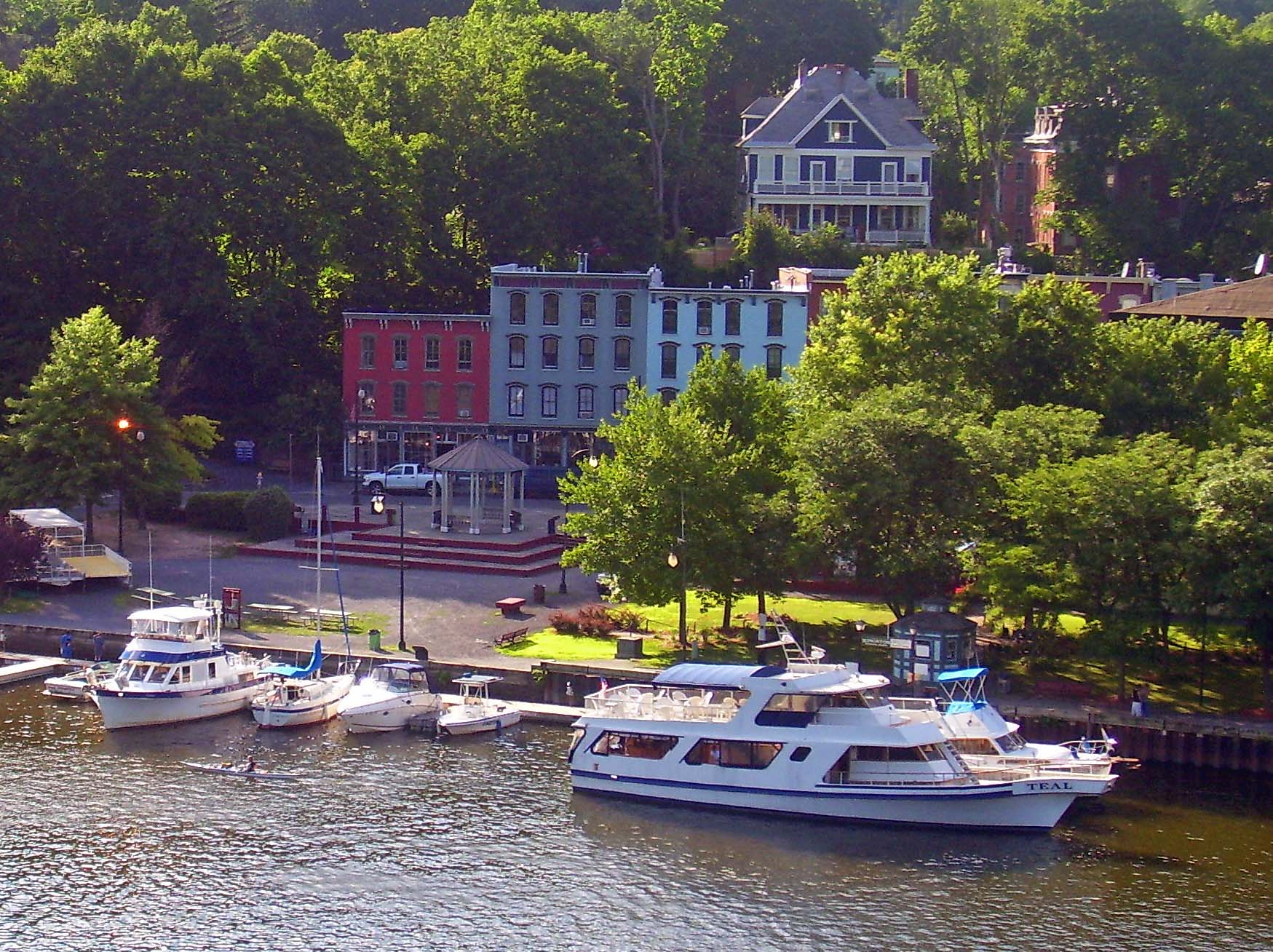
The Rondout-West Strand neighborhood in Kingston, once the end of the canal.

Settlement did slowly progress inland, but it was not until well after American independence that the Rondout would become economically important. In the early 1820s two Philadelphia businessmen realized the immense profits that could be made if they could find a way to get the mostly unmined high-quality anthracite coal from undeveloped Northeastern Pennsylvania to the lucrative markets of New York City. Railroads had not yet been perfected, so they saw the possibility of a canal running from Honesdale, Pennsylvania, to the Hudson at what was then the village of Rondout. In 1828 they obtained a charter for their company to do this, and the Delaware and Hudson Canal was opened a few years later. Coal was transferred from canal barges to river ships at Rondout, and it became a boomtown quickly. The canal remained a prosperous operation until late in the 19th century when rail transportation finally became more affordable, and ended its days in 1904 after a brief period carrying Rosendale cement. The former terminal port area for the canal is now Kingston's Rondout-West Strand Historic District, listed on the National Register of Historic Places.

=== Reservoir era ===
In the mid-20th century, the stream would find another important use. Naturalist John Burroughs had anticipated it when he explored the upper headwaters with a friend early in the century, writing in his 1910 essay "A Bed of Boughs" of the purity of the stream's waters and its benefits for both man and fish:

My eyes had never before beheld such beauty in a mountain stream. The water was almost as transparent as the air — was, indeed, like liquid air; and as it lay in these wells and pits enveloped in shadow, or lit up by a chance ray of the vertical sun, it was a perpetual feast to the eye — so cool, so deep, so pure; every reach and pool like a vast spring. You lay down and drank or dipped the water up in your cup, and found it just the right degree of refreshing coldness. One is never prepared for the clearness of the water in these streams. It is always a surprise. See them every year for a dozen years, and yet, when you first come upon one, you will utter an exclamation. I saw nothing like it in the Adirondacks, nor in Canada. Absolutely without stain or hint of impurity, it seems to magnify like a lens, so that the bed of the stream and the fish in it appear deceptively near. It is rare to find even a trout stream that is not a little "off color," as they say of diamonds, but the waters in the section of which I am writing have the genuine ray; it is the undimmed and untarnished diamond. If I were a trout, I should ascend every stream till I found the Rondout. It is the ideal brook.

Starting in 1915 with Ashokan Reservoir, New York City had been expanding its water supply system on the east side of the Hudson River with reservoirs in the Catskills to its west. In 1937 it began construction of Merriman Dam near Lackawack, which would soon be flooded to allow the growing city to tap the pure waters Burroughs had written about. Those waters began to reach city taps in 1951, and the reservoir itself was completed three years later. Today, via the Delaware Aqueduct, and the connections it has via the Neversink Aqueduct to the Neversink, Pepacton and Cannonsville reservoirs to the west supplementing the upper Rondout's drainage, it supplies half the city's daily water draw.

== See also ==
- List of rivers of New York
- List of crossings of Rondout Creek
- MV Rip Van Winkle
