= Port Ewen, New York =

- CDP
- Location in Ulster County and the state of New York.
- Coordinates: 41°54′25″N 73°58′43″W
- Country: United States
- State: New York
- County: Ulster

Area
  - Total: 2.74 sq mi (7.10 km^{2})
  - Land: 2.09 sq mi (5.41 km^{2})
  - Water: 0.65 sq mi (1.69 km^{2})
- Elevation: 184 ft (56 m)

Population (2020)
  - Total: 3,678
  - Density: 1,760.5/sq mi (679.74/km^{2})
- Time zone: UTC-5 (Eastern (EST))
  - Summer (DST): UTC-4 (EDT)
- ZIP code: 12466
- Area code: 845
- FIPS code: 36-59311
- GNIS feature ID: 0960965

Port Ewen is a hamlet (and census-designated place) in Ulster County, New York, United States. The population was 3,678 at the 2020 census. Port Ewen is in the Town of Esopus, south of Kingston, along U.S. Route 9W. Port Ewen is bounded by the Rondout Creek to the north, the Hudson River to the east, the hamlets of Connelly and Sleightsburgh to the northwest and northeast, respectively, the hamlet of Ulster Park to the south, and New Salem to the west.

== History ==
The prospect of finding work with the Pennsylvania Coal Company attracted many to Port Ewen. Port Ewen was served by the West Shore Railroad, which shipped, among other freight, high explosives produced by the Nitro Powder Company in Kingston.

Before the opening of the Kingston–Port Ewen Suspension Bridge in 1921, those wishing to cross the Rondout Creek would have to take the Skillypot, a chain ferry that ran to Sleightsburgh, noted for its sporadic service.

=== Hercules Powder Company ===
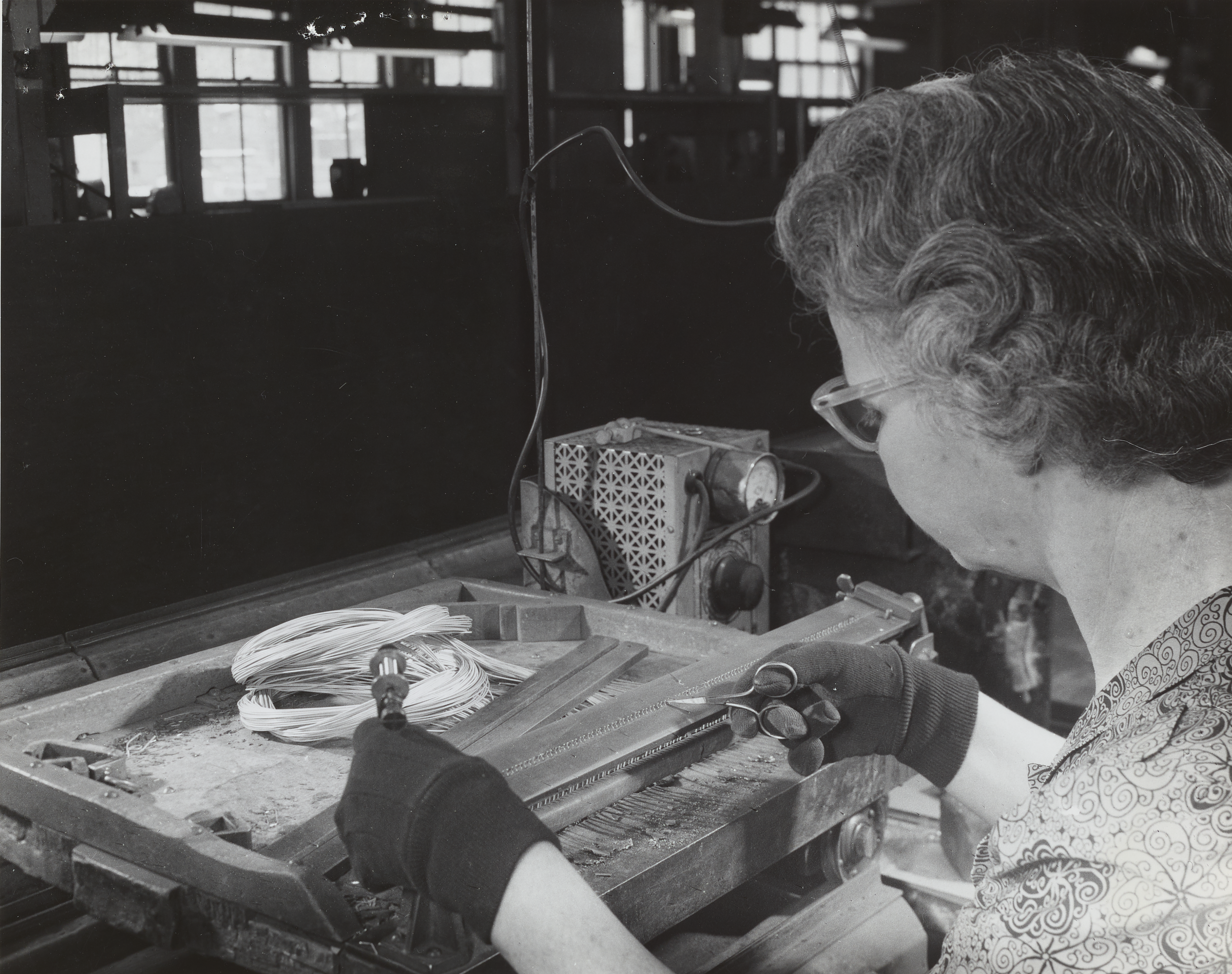
Trimming platinum wires at Hercules Port Ewen

Hercules Powder Company was formed in 1882 by DuPont and Laflin & Rand Powder Company. In 1902 by DuPont purchased Laflin & Rand which it operated as a subsidiary. In 1904 it dissolved Hercules as it continued to consolidate it holdings. However in 1912 successful antitrust litigation forced DuPont to divest itself of Laflin and much of its explosive manufacturing. Laflin's patents for smokeless powder went to a revived Hercules Powder Company based in Wilmington, Delaware. The Port Ewen plant produced a range of special detonators designed for military use, as well as construction jobs that required blasts of dynamite. In 1973, two women were injured in an explosion of blasting caps.

=== Religious Establishments ===
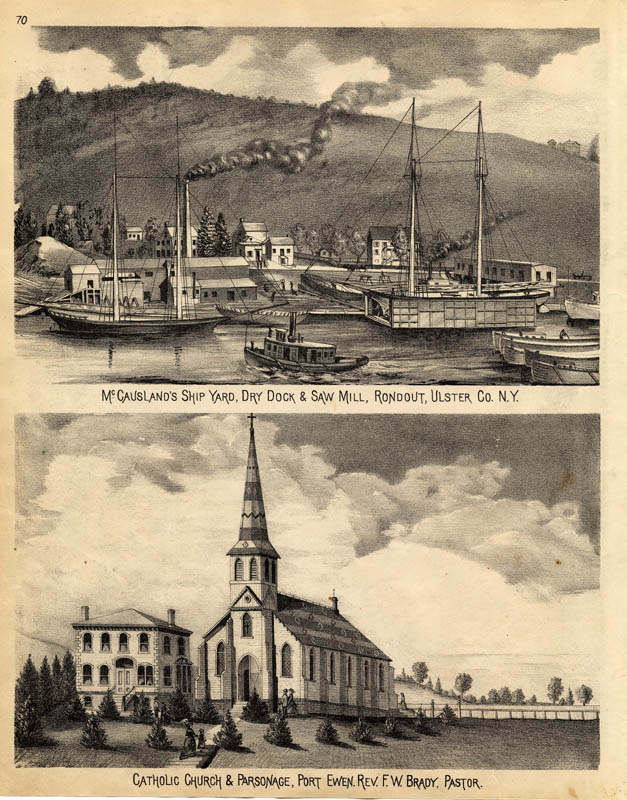
Lower image: The Catholic Church of the Presentation of the Blessed Virgin Mary in Port Ewen, as seen from the Hudson River

Port Ewen has been served by several religious establishments, including the Town of Esopus United Methodist Church, the Catholic Church of the Presentation of the Blessed Virgin Mary, and the Reformed Church of Port Ewen.

==== Catholic Church of the Presentation ====
A Catholic mission of St. Mary's in Rondout had been established in Port Ewen for the large number of boatmen who lived on the northern side of Rondout Creek in Kingston. In 1873 the mission was split off as a separate parish and placed in the charge of Rev. Michael Phelan. The Church of the Presentation of the Blessed Virgin Mary was dedicated by Archbishop John McCloskey on June 14, 1874. Aside from attending to missions in the nearby hamlets of Eddyville and Esopus, Phelan also traveled to southern Ulster County, where he formed the nucleus of a parish in the hamlet of Milton.

Rev. Thomas O'Hanlon became pastor of Port Ewen's Church of the Presentation in 1877. O'Hanlon built the Catholic Church of the Sacred Heart in Eddyville. He died in 1883 and was buried at the entrance of the church.

== Environmental Concerns ==
Port Ewen and adjacent Ulster Park were once a work site of Dyno Nobel explosives, listed as a manufacturing/distribution location in the 2012 Sustainability Report issued by Dyno Nobel / Incitec Pivot Limited. The location of the former Hercules Inc./Dyno-Nobel site has been designated a state Superfund site: "The site is listed as a "Class 2" site in the State Registry of Inactive Hazardous Waste Disposal Sites (list of State Superfund sites). A Class 2 site represents a significant threat to public health or the environment and action is required." The downstream spread of contaminants has impacted Port Ewen from the original site in Ulster Park. "The primary contaminants of concern at the site are inorganic (metals) in the soil site-wide and creek sediments and "energetic" (potentially explosive) materials in wetland sediment and in specific locations in the manufacturing area. Volatile organic compounds (e.g., chlorinated solvents such as trichloroethene or TCE) are also present in the groundwater near the former shell plant. The presence of potentially explosive materials complicate implementation of a remedy at this site."

The New York State Department of Environmental Conservation (NYS DEC) had identified in a May 2023 state report, "mercury, lead, copper, zinc, and dozens of other chemicals" in sediment investigations of Plantasie Creek, adjacent to the public elementary school. According to the NY DEC, "Former manufacturing operations for primers and igniters for explosives took place in the developed portion of the site, which occupies approximately 100 acres. However, present-day operations include producing electric detonators within a smaller portion of the site. Disposal activities occurred within the plant area and in wetland areas in the eastern portion of the property. Most of the surrounding areas are naturally vegetated with cover types ranging from old fields to forested areas." A New York State Department of Environmental Conservation Superfund Community Report for June 2024 indicated that "On May 21, 2024, DEC issued a Notice of Violation (NOV) to the town of Esopus for the unpermitted work. The town immediately worked closely with DEC to implement corrective measures, including covering areas of soil disturbance and installing temporary fencing near the elementary school to reduce the risk of public exposure."

Levels of lead exceeding 15 ppb have been found in some water supplies of Robert R. Graves Elementary, Port Ewen's public elementary school, according to an August 2021 analysis completed by EnviroTest Laboratories, LLC, with the highest recorded level of 90 ppb. Lead levels in water supplies exceeding 15 ppb have also been found in nearby Anna Devine Elementary School, located in Ulster Park, according to an analysis completed on behalf of Ulster BOCES. The highest level of lead recorded in the Anna Devine report was 230 ppb.

== Geography ==
Port Ewen is on the west bank of the Hudson River at the mouth of Rondout Creek.

Port Ewen is located at 41°54′25″N 73°58′43″W (41.906980, -73.978599).

According to the United States Census Bureau, the CDP has a total area of 2.7 square miles (7.0 km^{2}), of which 2.0 square miles (5.2 km^{2}) is land and 0.7 square miles (1.8 km^{2}) (26.97%) is water.

== Demographics ==
Historical population
Census	Pop.	Note	%±
2000	3,650		—
2010	3,546		−2.8%
2020	3,678		3.7%
U.S. Decennial Census

=== 2020 census ===
As of the 2020 census, Port Ewen had a population of 3,678. The median age was 50.1 years. 15.8% of residents were under the age of 18 and 26.7% of residents were 65 years of age or older. For every 100 females there were 89.6 males, and for every 100 females age 18 and over there were 86.6 males age 18 and over.

96.5% of residents lived in urban areas, while 3.5% lived in rural areas.

There were 1,660 households in Port Ewen, of which 21.0% had children under the age of 18 living in them. Of all households, 42.5% were married-couple households, 16.1% were households with a male householder and no spouse or partner present, and 32.0% were households with a female householder and no spouse or partner present. About 33.5% of all households were made up of individuals and 18.6% had someone living alone who was 65 years of age or older. The average family size was 2.91.

There were 1,784 housing units, including 1,660 occupied housing units and 124 vacant housing units. Overall, 7.0% of housing units were vacant. The homeowner vacancy rate was 1.7% and the rental vacancy rate was 4.1%.

Racial composition as of the 2020 census
Race	Number	Percent
White	3,020	82.1%
Black or African American	211	5.7%
American Indian and Alaska Native	3	0.1%
Asian	59	1.6%
Native Hawaiian and Other Pacific Islander	0	0.0%
Some other race	108	2.9%
Two or more races	277	7.5%
Hispanic or Latino (of any race)	255	6.9%

=== 2000 census ===
In the CDP, the population in 2000 was spread out, with 25.3% under the age of 18, 5.9% from 18 to 24, 30.0% from 25 to 44, 26.1% from 45 to 64, and 12.7% who were 65 years of age or older. The median age was 39 years. For every 100 females, there were 89.4 males. For every 100 females age 18 and over, there were 86.3 males.

The median income for a household in 2000 was $41,949, and the median income for a family was $50,208. Males had a median income of $37,043 versus $27,583 for females. The per capita income for the CDP was $22,040. About 5.1% of families and 8.8% of the population were below the poverty line, including 14.5% of those under age 18 and 10.8% of those age 65 or over.

== Education ==
The school district for the CDP is Kingston City School District. The comprehensive high school of the Kingston City district is Kingston High School.

== Notable people ==
Sojourner Truth, American abolitionist and activist, was enslaved in West Park, a few miles south of Port Ewen, also within the Town of Esopus. Truth was enslaved by Martinus Schryver from 1808-1810, forced to work at the tavern in town, until Schryver legally trafficked her to John Dunlap, also of West Park. Truth was finally able to escape being held against her will in 1826. A statue of her now stands at the corner of Broadway and Salem Street.

Luann de Lesseps, former countess and current star of Real Housewives of New York City, purchased a home along the Hudson River in 2018. It has even been featured on the television show.
