= John T. Loughran Bridge =

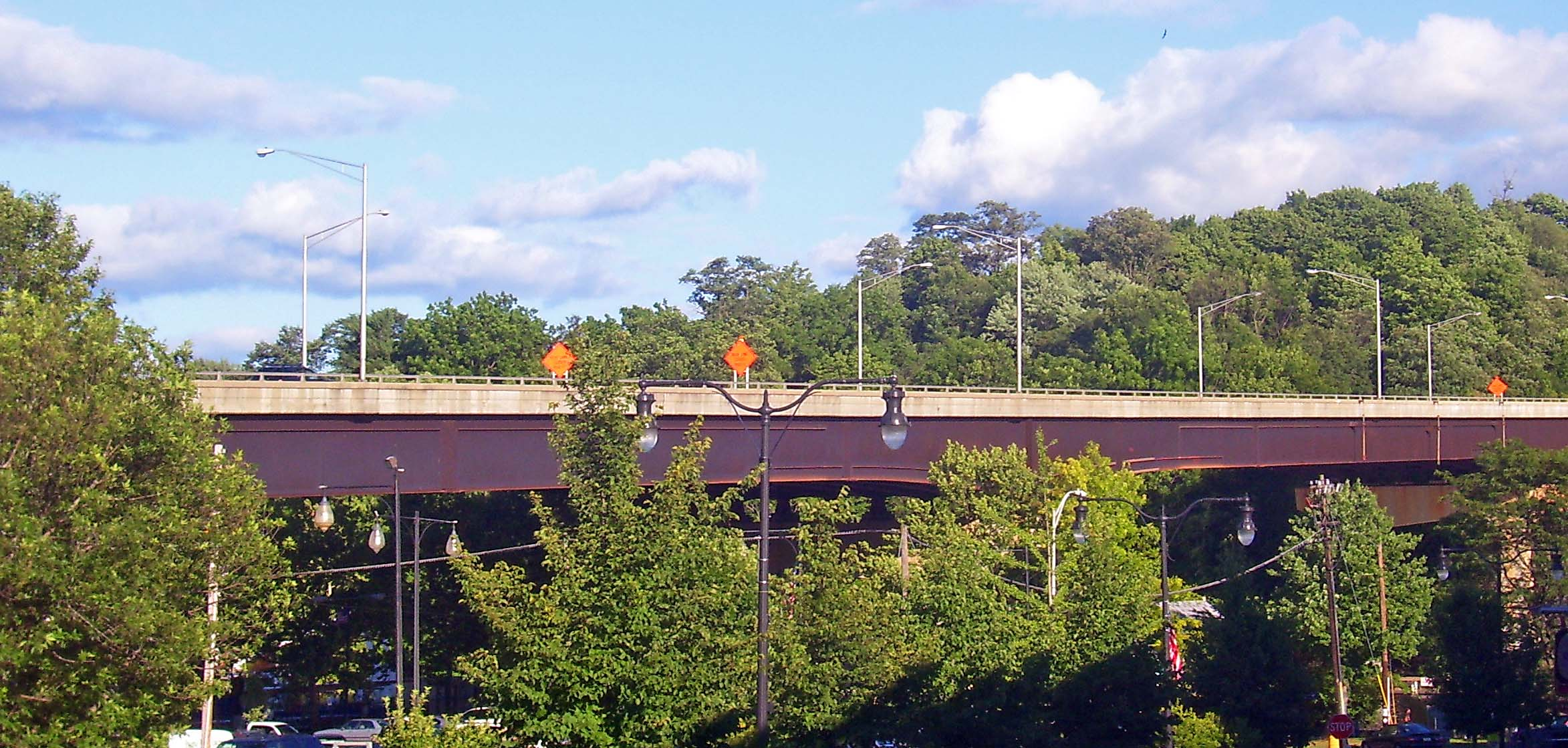
- Bridge seen from Broadway in Kingston
- Coordinates: 41°55′04″N 73°58′54″W
- Carries: Four lanes of US 9W
- Crosses: Rondout Creek
- Locale: Kingston-Port Ewen, New York
- Maintained by: New York State Department of Transportation
- ID number: 000000001069749

Characteristics
- Design: Steel continuous girder bridge
- Total length: 967 feet (294.7 m)
- Width: 71 feet (21.7 m)
- Longest span: 355 feet (108 m)
- Load limit: 75.6 short tons (68.6 t)
- Clearance below: 56 feet (17 m)

History
- Construction start: 1977
- Construction end: 1979
- Opened: 1979

Statistics
- Daily traffic: 15,986 (2017)

Location
- Interactive map of John T. Loughran Bridge

The John T. Loughran Bridge carries U.S. Route 9W (US 9W) over Rondout Creek between Kingston and Port Ewen, New York, United States. It also crosses over Ferry Street on the Kingston side. It is located just downriver from the historic Kingston-Port Ewen Suspension Bridge, which carried 9W until the Loughran Bridge was constructed. It is just upriver from where the Rondout empties into the Hudson River.

It is a continuous girder bridge with four spans, totalling 967 feet (294.7 m) in length. The main span crosses Rondout Creek and has a length of 355 feet (108 m). In 1979, upon its opening, it was dedicated and named for John T. Loughran, a Kingston native whose judicial career was capped by his service as chief judge of the New York Court of Appeals, the state's highest judicial position, from 1945 until his death in 1953.

== History ==
Aerial view of Rondout Creek and downtown Kingston, showing the old bridge (top) and new bridge (bottom)

The bridge was built in conjunction with a 2.4-mile-long (3.9 km) north-south arterial to accommodate increasing volumes of traffic on the Kingston-Port Ewen Suspension Bridge and its approaches. (Note: In 1980, the section of Kingston's north-south arterial, including a portion of the new bridge over Rondout Creek, was named "The Frank Koenig Boulevard" in honor of the former mayor of Kingston.) Based on 2019 annual average daily traffic (AADT) estimates, the John T. Loughran Bridge carried approximately three-quarters of the combined traffic crossing Rondout Creek on the two bridges.

Construction of the bridge required the demolition of a few blocks of the West Strand neighborhood on the north side. This rallied preservationists to get the decaying area, once Kingston's waterfront in the days of the Delaware and Hudson Canal, designated a historic district. It was later listed on the National Register of Historic Places. Today many of the buildings have been renovated and the area is a popular destination for visitors to the city.

The bridge received the American Institute of Steel Construction's 1980 Prize Bridge Award in the medium-span, high-clearance category.

== See also ==
- List of crossings of Rondout Creek
