= Kingston–Port Ewen Suspension Bridge =

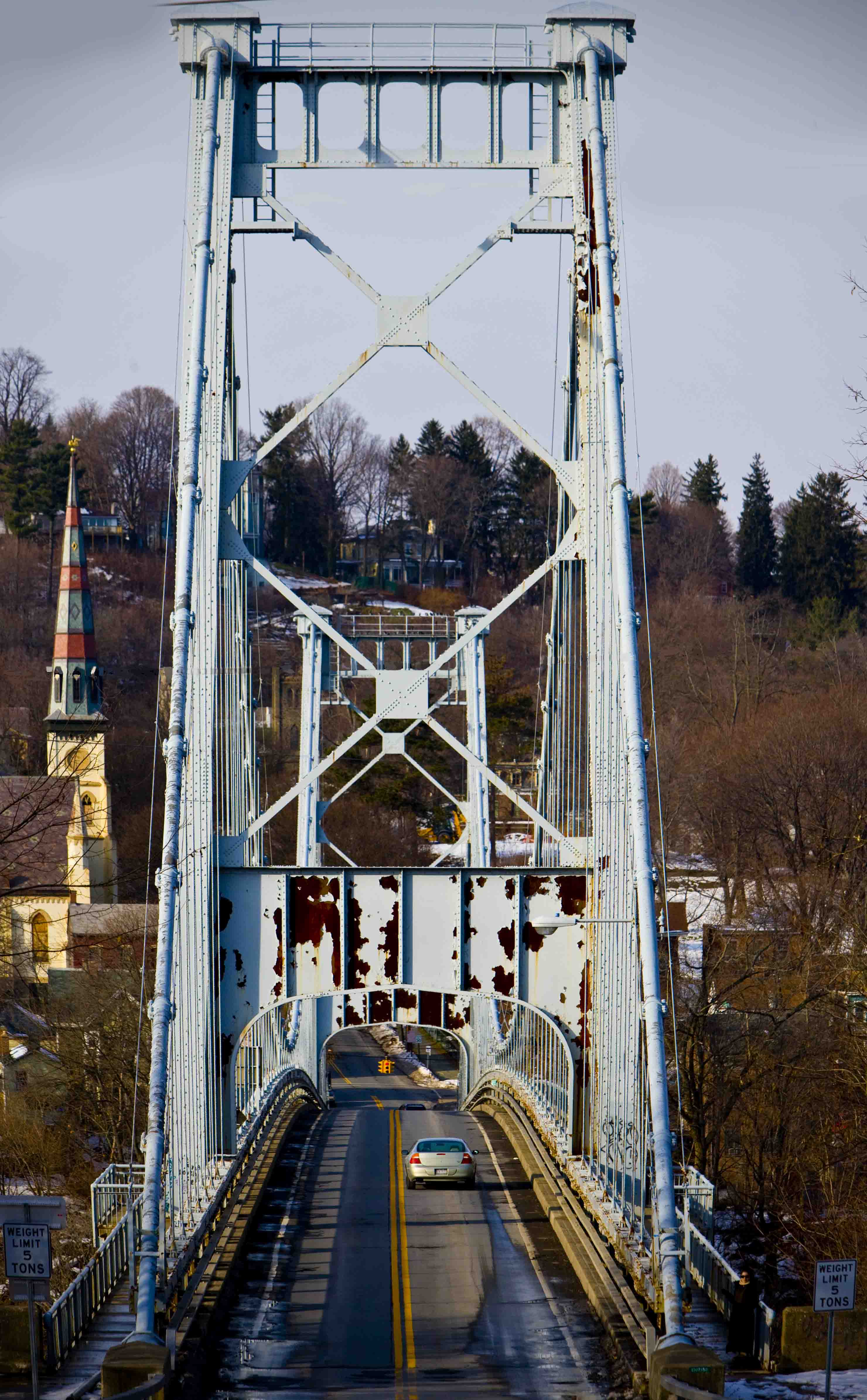
- Bridge looking north into Kingston, 2007.
- Coordinates: 41.9162°N 73.9841°W
- Carries: Wurts Street (NY 984D)
- Crosses: Rondout Creek
- Locale: Kingston, New York
- Maintained by: New York State Department of Transportation
- ID number: 1007350

Characteristics
- Design: Wire cable Suspension bridge
- Total length: 1,145 ft (349 m)
- Width: 37 ft (11 m)
- Longest span: 705 ft (215 m)
- Clearance below: 85 ft (26 m)

History
- Opened: May 3, 1922
- Dedicated: November 29, 1921
- Renovated: 1973, 2021–2024

Statistics
- Daily traffic: 4,906 (2016)
- Toll: no
- Kingston-Port Ewen Suspension Bridge
- U.S. National Register of Historic Places
- NRHP reference No.: 80002783
- Added to NRHP: April 30, 1980

Location
- Interactive map of Kingston–Port Ewen Suspension Bridge

The Kingston–Port Ewen Suspension Bridge, originally known as the Rondout Creek Bridge and later called the Wurts Street Bridge, is a steel suspension bridge spanning Rondout Creek near its confluence with the Hudson River. The bridge has a main span of 705 feet (215 m), and it connects the City of Kingston to the north with the village of Port Ewen to the south.

Plans for a bridge across Rondout Creek date to the early 20th century, when local officials sought a permanent replacement for ferry service, whose limited capacity had become a traffic bottleneck. After several proposed bridge designs were abandoned, a suspension bridge design was selected in 1919. Construction began in 1920, and the bridge was dedicated on November 29, 1921, before opening to vehicular traffic on May 3, 1922. It became an important link in the north–south highway along the west bank of the Hudson River. It was also the first American suspension bridge designed with a continuous stiffening truss and was regarded as an important demonstration of the adaptability of the suspension principle to relatively short highway spans.

The bridge carried U.S. Route 9W until 1979, when the John T. Loughran Bridge opened downstream and became the principal crossing for vehicular traffic over Rondout Creek. The original bridge was listed on the National Register of Historic Places in 1980 and underwent a major rehabilitation beginning in 2021, reopening to traffic on July 2, 2024.

== History ==
=== Background ===
According to local tradition, a charter for a ferry crossing between Kingston and Sleightsburgh was granted by the Royal Governor of New York during the reign of Queen Anne. Early ferries crossing Rondout Creek were propelled by oars. These were eventually replaced by chain ferries powered first by human labor, then by horse engines, and later by steam engines. As automobile use increased in the early 20th century, the ferry became a bottleneck for vehicles traveling along the developing highway network, including the route that followed the west bank of the Hudson River south of Albany toward New York City. (Note: Before the completion of the George Washington Bridge, ferries provided service across the Hudson River between the Englewood side of the river in New Jersey and Dyckman Street in New York City.)

The last ferry on the crossing was a chain ferry named Riverside, commonly known as the Skillypot. The nickname was reportedly derived from schildpad, the Dutch word for tortoise. Built in 1870, the Skillypot could carry only four to six automobiles. During the summer, long lines of vehicles frequently formed while motorists waited to cross. Local boys earned money by directing drivers along roads to the bridge at Eddyville, located approximately three miles (4.8 km) upstream. The bridge at Eddyville also provided an alternative crossing when Rondout Creek froze during the winter or when the ferry broke down.

Although local residents had long advocated for a bridge, the City of Kingston and the Town of Esopus lacked the funds to construct one. In 1911, the Ulster Park Grange appointed a committee to promote the project and bring it to the attention of the Kingston Chamber of Commerce. The effort developed into an organized campaign involving civic organizations and representatives from both sides of Rondout Creek. Philip Elting was among those involved in developing a legislative proposal to incorporate the crossing into the state highway system. The bill was introduced in the state legislature by Assemblyman Andrew J. Cook and signed into law by Governor John Alden Dix in April 1912. (Note: In 1912, Assemblyman Andrew J. Cook represented Ulster County's 1st Assembly District during the 135th New York State Legislature. At the time, the minority leader of the New York State Assembly was Al Smith, who helped Cook advance the bill out of the rules committee.) The law specifically provided for a bridge over Rondout Creek at or near the site of the chain ferry, to be constructed and maintained by the New York State Department of Highways.

=== Original plans ===
Two possible locations were originally considered for a bridge: one at the foot of Hasbrouck Avenue, the site of the Skillypot ferry, and the other at the foot of Wurts Street. (Note: The foot of Hasbrouck Avenue is now part of the grounds of the Hudson River Maritime Museum.) At a public hearing in December 1912, representatives of several shipping companies objected to the Hasbrouck Avenue location, citing concerns about navigation, vessel maneuvering, and interference with existing landings. The drawbridge proposed for this location was also expected to require frequent openings to allow vessels to pass.

In April 1914, the State Highway Department described proposed plans for a bridge consisting of a steel viaduct encased in concrete along the Wurts Street alignment. The design provided sufficient clearance to avoid the need for a drawbridge and met requirements established by the War Department, including a clearance of at least 70 feet (21 m) above the water and a navigable opening of at least 120 feet (37 m). The State Highway Department subsequently revised the plans to place the bridge piers at the edges of the navigable channel and increase the height of the structure. The War Department approved the revised plans in November 1914.

After the state provided maps identifying eight parcels of land needed for the bridge approaches, Ulster County began acquiring the necessary right of way. An agreement to purchase the final parcel was reached in September 1915. Plans and specifications for the proposed bridge were prepared for the State Highway Department by William Russell Davis, a consulting engineer from Albany. His design called for two steel arch spans, each 360 feet (110 m) long, supported by a central pier on Island Dock. The central pier was to rest on a pile foundation. Of the 390 wooden piles, 338 were driven at an angle (batter piles) and 52 were driven vertically (plumb piles). (Note: The proposed arch structure was described as being similar to the Hell Gate Bridge.) (Note: Island Dock was a man-made island in Rondout Creek, constructed in 1848 as a coal-transfer facility where coal shipped through the Delaware and Hudson Canal was transferred to vessels bound for the Hudson River.)

In April 1916, bids were solicited for construction of the bridge, but the State Highway Department rejected all submissions because the lowest bid, at $320,881, exceeded the available appropriation by approximately $40,000 after accounting for engineering and inspection expenses. Later that month, the State Highway Department agreed to proceed with the concrete foundation work under a separate contract while postponing construction of the superstructure until steel prices declined from their unprecedented levels amid wartime demand. In June 1916, the state awarded the H. K. Corbin Company a $61,360 contract for construction of the concrete abutments. Work on the concrete foundations and abutments continued through 1918, but some pier work remained unfinished in early 1919, and construction of the steel superstructure had yet to begin.

In 1918, State Senator Charles W. Walton introduced a bill authorizing an appropriation of up to $139,000 to complete the bridge. Governor Charles Seymour Whitman signed the bill into law in May of that year. Following the end of World War I, bids for construction of the remaining portions of the bridge, including the steel superstructure, were advertised in March 1919.

=== Design controversy, redesign and bidding ===
Soon after taking office as New York State Highway Commissioner, Frederick Stuart Greene reviewed the plans for the proposed bridge and questioned the safety of the foundations, particularly the batter piles supporting the central pier. After consulting with engineer Daniel E. Moran, he withdrew the project from bidding on April 22, 1919, two days before bids were scheduled to be opened. The disagreement over the design was reported in Engineering News-Record on August 14, 1919, in which Davis disputed Greene's assessment and maintained that the foundation of the central pier was adequately designed.

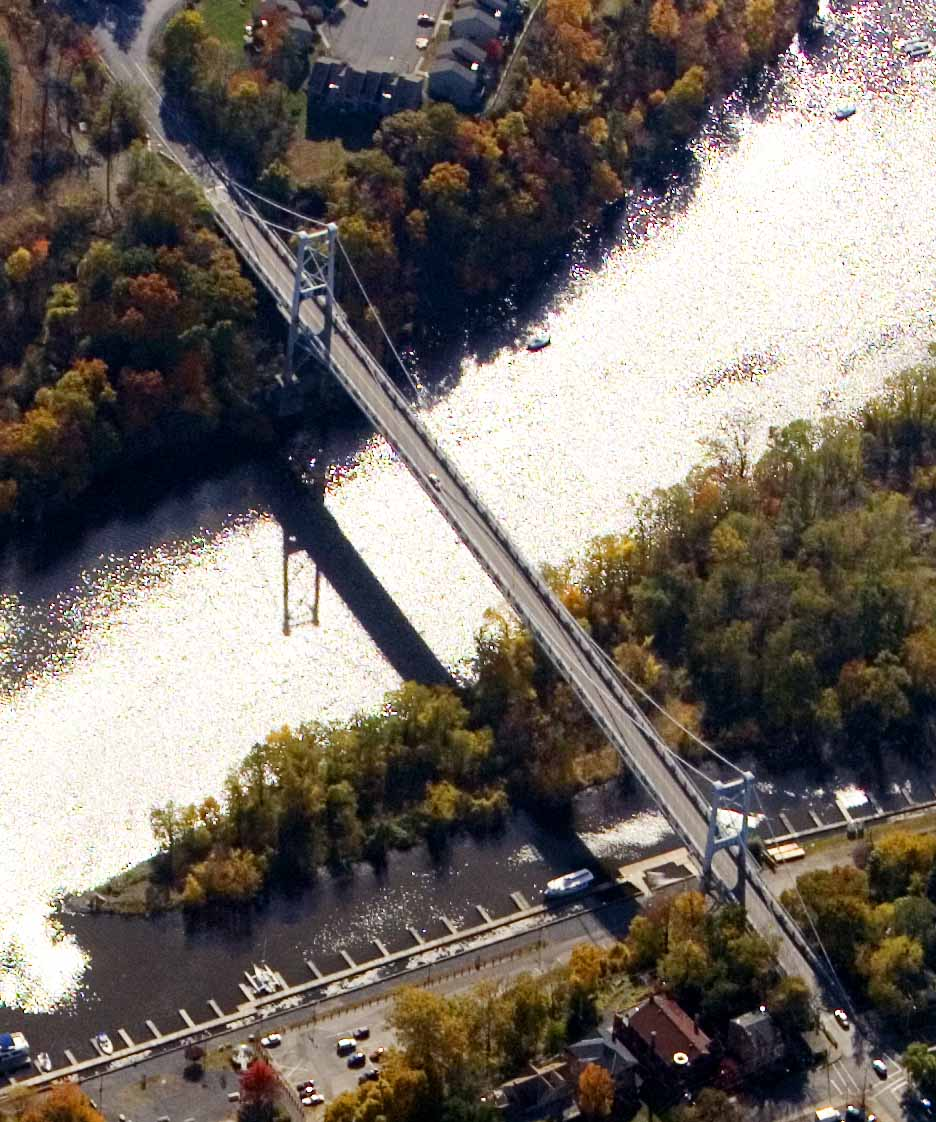
Aerial view of the suspension bridge, which passes over the man-made island.

Greene was determined to see the bridge built. At a dinner in August 1919, he declared that he would "build that bridge or bust a lung," expressing his frustration over the project's delays. He recounted how, on a recent drive from Newburgh to Albany, he had arrived at the Skillypot ferry after it had closed for the night and was forced to take a long, difficult detour to cross Rondout Creek.

Greene retained Moran to prepare a replacement design for the crossing, initially consisting of a concrete viaduct, a steel truss spanning Rondout Creek, and additional concrete arches. The proposal was intended to reduce construction costs. However, subsequent borings at Island Dock revealed that bedrock was deeper than anticipated, complicating the proposed foundation work. After considering several alternatives, Greene and Moran selected a suspension bridge. The design eliminated the need for a pier in Rondout Creek and was expected to reduce both construction costs and the time required to complete the project.

In November 1919, preliminary construction work began with the excavation of two shafts for the south anchorage. The work was carried out by the contracting firm of Booth & Flynn, which had been awarded a contract for the excavation. The new bridge was estimated to cost approximately $640,000, plus another $80,000 for the approaches. As only about $300,000 in funds were available, Senator Walton and Assemblyman Simon B. Van Wagenen introduced bills in the state legislature seeking an appropriation to cover the funding shortfall. Meanwhile, bids for the remainder of the bridge construction were being solicited, and 14 sets of plans were distributed to prospective bidders. Greene hoped to receive at least nine bids, but none were submitted by the February 27, 1920, deadline.

Greene speculated that prospective bidders believed that sufficient funds were not available to pay for the project and did not want to spend time preparing bids. He also acknowledged that he might have underestimated the cost of the cable. On March 3, a new advertisement was issued inviting bids for the bridge. Although the specifications remained unchanged, the engineers' cost estimate was increased by $60,000. Two days after Governor Al Smith signed legislation appropriating $420,000 for the bridge and its approaches, the Terry & Tench Company submitted the sole bid, in the amount of $637,124.20. The award of the contract was subsequently delayed by new right-of-way requirements and the need to obtain agreements with property owners, as the consents previously secured for the earlier bridge design had been withdrawn. The contract was awarded on April 7, 1920.

=== Construction and opening ===
Construction materials began arriving at the site in August 1920, by which time excavation for the piers was underway. On September 16, 1920, concrete was poured for the new Abeel Street abutment on the Kingston side of the bridge. Two days later, Governor Smith laid the cornerstone at the same approach during a ceremony attended by approximately 1,500 local residents. By December 1920, the concrete foundations for the north tower had been completed, while the top four feet (1.2 m) of the existing concrete foundation on the opposite side of Rondout Creek had been removed to prepare it for the south tower. Steel for the towers had also begun arriving at the site. By the end of the month, the bases for the north tower had been placed on the concrete foundations, while those for the south tower had arrived and were being unloaded from flatcars on the Ulster and Delaware Railroad tracks.

By April 1921, the steel framework for both towers had been erected, although riveting was still underway. By mid-May, workers had completed a temporary wooden footwalk suspended between the towers, which was used to spin the main cables; the footwalk was six feet (1.8 m) wide. The cable spinning operation took place from June 6 to July 14, 1921, when workers completed stringing the galvanized steel wires that formed the two main cables. In the meantime, a separate contract was awarded for construction of the south approach, including a 0.32-mile (0.51 km) road connecting the bridge to the existing state highway in Port Ewen.

View of the bridge from the south anchorage in 2018

During construction, it was discovered that more than 100 of the cast-steel clamps used to connect the vertical suspenders to the main cables were missing one of their projecting lugs. Rather than delay construction while replacement castings were manufactured, the missing lugs were attached by thermit welding at a local machine shop in Kingston. By the end of July, the steel framework had been erected from the anchorages to the towers on both sides of the creek, and riveting was underway on the north side. Traveling cranes operating from both sides of the creek were then used to extend the framework outward from the towers toward the center of the bridge. As the framework was erected, it was connected to the main suspension cables by vertical wire ropes known as suspenders, with riveting proceeding alongside the erection work. The flooring was also to be installed from both ends of the bridge to distribute its weight evenly across the framework. The two sections of the steel framework met over Rondout Creek on August 27, 1921. Additional structural steel was installed over the following days, with the final piece of steel for the bridge deck put into place by the end of the month.

In August 1921, cracks were discovered in the metal bands holding the bridge's main suspension cables together. The Weehawken Welding Company sent Catherine Nelson, its best welder, to perform the repairs high above Rondout Creek. (Note: In a 1929 retrospective, Nelson recounted another aspect of her work on the Rondout Creek Bridge, which involved welding rivets that cracked during construction. Her work reportedly avoided the need to replace 48 girders, each of which would have cost $3,000.) Her presence attracted considerable attention, as contemporary newspaper accounts described her as the only woman engaged in outdoor welding in the world. A cameraman from Pathé Weekly was also sent to the site to film her work for the company's newsreel, which was shown in movie theaters across the United States.

Installation of the concrete roadway across the bridge was completed in mid-October. The work of wrapping the two main suspension cables began at the end of the month, using a machine designed by Holton D. Robinson. The machine wrapped two wires simultaneously around each cable to form an outer covering intended to protect it from the weather. As completion of the bridge drew closer, preparations were arranged for a public celebration to mark its official dedication on November 29, 1921. The festivities included a luncheon at the State Armory at Kingston, a parade down Broadway, speeches at the bridge, and fireworks. An estimated 10,000 people attended the bridge's dedication. Although pedestrians crossed the bridge during the festivities, it remained closed to vehicular traffic because of unfinished construction and delays in completing the approach roads.

The work of wrapping the main cables continued through the end of December 1921. By mid-January 1922, the remaining work consisted primarily of adjustments to the main and side spans and completion of the painting. Superintendent Arthur J. Spooner of Terry & Tench departed the site on February 4, by which time the principal construction work was considered complete. Some painting remained and was deferred until the spring, while the installation of electric lights had been assigned to a subcontractor.

Construction of the south approach continued into the spring of 1922 and required blasting through solid rock to excavate a cut through a hill. After the final surfacing of the approach roadway had progressed sufficiently to permit traffic, the Rondout Creek Bridge and the connecting road to the state highway in Port Ewen opened to vehicular traffic on May 3, 1922. The Skillypot continued operating for several months after the bridge opened, although its use had dwindled to carrying pedestrians between Sleightsburgh and Kingston and occasionally a motorist unaware that the new bridge was open. The ferry made its final trips on October 14, 1922.

=== Later history ===
View of the bridge from Kingston in 2023

The opening of the Rondout Creek Bridge to vehicular traffic, followed by the completion of the Storm King Highway four months later, marked important milestones in the development of the north-south highway along the west bank of the Hudson River. (Note: The Storm King Highway opened in September 1922, reducing the distance between Nyack and Newburgh by 16 miles (26 km). Construction of the 4.5-mile (7.2 km) roadway took seven years and cost approximately $1.5 million, including surveying, condemnation proceedings, and related expenses.) The state highway across the bridge was originally designated as part of Route 3, an unsigned legislative route established by the 1912 legislation that authorized construction of the bridge. By 1925, it had become part of NY 10. The route was subsequently incorporated into the United States Numbered Highway System as U.S. Route 9W. (Note: In the original 1925 plan for the U.S. Numbered Highway System, the route from the Canadian border through Albany and Kingston to New Jersey was designated as U.S. Route 9. Frederick Stuart Greene, then superintendent of the New York State Department of Public Works, opposed including the west-bank highway in the proposed system, arguing that it was not a transcontinental route. When the system was finalized, U.S. Route 9 was divided into two branches along the Hudson River: U.S. Route 9E on the east bank and U.S. Route 9W on the west bank.)

In January 1954, the New York State Department of Public Works presented an arterial route plan for Kingston intended to eliminate traffic bottlenecks and provide a spur connecting to the New York State Thruway. The plan proposed constructing a new northern approach to the Rondout Creek Bridge, which would involve widening Wurts Street and portions of McEntee Street and Broadway to at least 44 feet (13 m). It also called for raising the elevation of these roadways to eliminate most of the steep grade on Wurts Street, with new overpasses at Abeel and West Union streets. The city's Common Council generally approved the arterial route plan but suggested eliminating the proposed bridge approach to avoid the expense of acquiring additional right of way. At the time, 60 percent of northbound vehicles crossing the bridge were through traffic destined for points north of the city, a flow that was expected to decline with the opening of the Thruway. In March 1954, the state agreed to defer changes to the bridge's northern approach pending a study of the effects of Thruway traffic. (Note: Following the opening of the Utica-Newburgh section of the Thruway on October 26, 1954, Kingston officials reported a marked decrease in traffic through the city.)

In 1958, concerns about the bridge's age, safety, and role as a traffic bottleneck prompted local officials to call for its replacement. Around the same time, state officials disclosed that engineers were studying a replacement, having determined that a new bridge would be more economical than improving the existing approaches. In 1960, the state commissioned a photogrammetric survey of the area around the bridge in preparation for drafting plans for a replacement crossing. The proposed bridge was expected to occupy a different location, with changes to its approaches intended to reduce the steep grade on the Port Ewen side and alter the Route 9W alignment. By March 1962, the state was studying aerial photographs of the Rondout and Port Ewen areas to help determine the location of the bridge and its approaches. Kingston's urban-renewal plans favored an approach parallel to Hasbrouck Avenue, although preliminary proposals faced objections over their potential effects on nearby church, school, and residential properties.

Aerial view of Rondout Creek and downtown Kingston, showing the original bridge (top) and its replacement (bottom)

By 1965, the New York State Department of Public Works had developed preliminary plans for a four-lane, divided, limited-access highway that would include a new bridge over Rondout Creek. Planning was delayed by a disagreement with the United States Army Corps of Engineers over the required navigational clearance, as the state favored a bridge with substantially less vertical clearance than the existing suspension bridge. By January 1967, the proposed bridge had become part of the Kingston Arterial Route, a planned 7.1-mile (11.4 km) divided highway extending from south of Port Ewen through Kingston to the U.S. Route 209 interchange in the Town of Ulster.

In 1972, the New York State Department of Transportation (NYSDOT) proposed closing the Rondout Creek Bridge for major repairs. The proposal was opposed by officials in Kingston and the Town of Esopus, who favored directing the funds toward construction of the replacement bridge included in the proposed arterial. NYSDOT maintained that a replacement would take at least five years to build and that it had no intention of demolishing the existing bridge, which provided an important connection between Esopus and the southeastern part of Kingston. That September, NYSDOT awarded a $367,490 contract to improve roads along the proposed detour route, including Route 213 and County Road 57 (Salem Street), which provided access to the Eddyville Bridge. In April 1973, NYSDOT awarded Klevens Construction Co. a $1,659,255 contract to rehabilitate the Rondout Creek Bridge. The work included removing the existing bridge deck and replacing it with a precast concrete deck. The bridge was closed for the rehabilitation from July 9 to December 1, 1973.

The U.S. Route 9W designation was removed from the bridge in 1979, when the John T. Loughran Bridge opened to the east and became the primary crossing for vehicular traffic over Rondout Creek. The new bridge was built in conjunction with a 2.4-mile-long (3.9 km) arterial extending north to Route 32. The Wurts Street Bridge nevertheless continued to carry local vehicular traffic, accounting for approximately one-quarter of the traffic volume between the two bridges, and remained an important connection for pedestrians and bicyclists. The new bridge was built without sidewalks as a cost-saving measure, since pedestrian access was already available via the older structure.

=== Preservation and restoration ===
The Kingston–Port Ewen Suspension Bridge was listed on the National Register of Historic Places in 1980, following a nomination sponsored by the Friends of Historic Kingston. The nomination recognized the bridge for its engineering and transportation significance, describing it as an important engineering accomplishment associated with early motoring and as a prominent visual landmark in the local area.

The bridge closure in September 2020

The bridge was closed on September 25, 2020 because of structural issues, following successive reductions in its posted weight limit. A three-year rehabilitation project began in 2021, with an estimated cost of $44.6 million. During removal of the bridge's cornerstone, workers discovered a copper time capsule. The capsule had not been properly sealed, and its contents had deteriorated after water entered it. (Note: According to an article published in the Daily Freeman at the time the cornerstone was laid, the time capsule contained copies of the city's directory and local newspapers, as well as a medal commemorating Kingston's 250th anniversary.)

As part of the rehabilitation, all 114 suspender ropes connecting the bridge deck to the main cables were replaced. Because the original construction plans were unavailable, the work required detailed field measurements using LiDAR and steel tape. At the cable anchorages, supplementary rock anchors and a jacking-beam system were installed to transfer some of the load carried by corroded eyebars. A dehumidification system was also installed to control moisture in the cable anchorages and help prevent further corrosion. Other improvements included a new deck made of lightweight concrete, wider sidewalks meeting accessibility standards, and decorative lighting. A new time capsule containing photographs, business cards, a thumb drive with videos, and rivets from the original bridge was placed in the cornerstone.

The project was estimated to cost $60 million. Following completion of the work, the bridge reopened to traffic and pedestrians on July 2, 2024. In 2025, the rehabilitation received an award in the Quality of Life/Community Development category for medium projects in the American Association of State Highway and Transportation Officials' America's Transportation Awards competition.

== Design ==
The Kingston–Port Ewen Suspension Bridge is a steel-wire suspension bridge. It has a total length of 1,145 feet (349 m), measured from anchorage to anchorage. The main span between the two towers is 705 feet (215 m) long, while the two side spans, extending between the towers and their respective anchorages, are each 176 feet 3 inches (53.72 m) long. The main span provides a clearance of 85 feet (26 m) above mean high water and is supported by two main cables carried over steel towers approximately 152 feet (46 m) high above the concrete piers. The bridge is 37 feet (11 m) wide, including a 22-foot-wide (6.7 m) roadway with a 7-foot-6-inch (2.29 m) sidewalk on each side. The effective width of each sidewalk is reduced to 4 feet 4 inches (1.32 m) by the presence of trusses. From a structural design perspective, the bridge was considered to be an important demonstration of the adaptability of the suspension principle to relatively short highway spans.

The bridge's north tower in 2018

The north tower, located on the Kingston side, is supported by two independent concrete piers, one beneath each leg. The south tower, on the Port Ewen side, incorporates an existing concrete pier built under the initial bridge contract, together with two new concrete pedestals. The tower legs are battered inward, narrowing the spacing between them from 38 feet (12 m) at the base to 27 feet (8.2 m) at the top. The use of battered tower legs in suspension bridges was introduced into bridge engineering practice by Holton D. Robinson, who first applied the design in 1919 to the Rondout Creek Bridge. The arrangement provided clearance for the roadway and stiffening truss between the tower columns while also increasing the towers' transverse stability.

Each of the two main cables has a diameter of 9 3/4 inches (25 cm) and consists of 1,974 galvanized steel wires grouped into seven strands. In the side spans, two auxiliary strands, each containing 76 wires, were added to each cable to accommodate the greater stresses resulting from the steeper cable inclination, increasing the cable diameter to 10 1/4 inches (26 cm). The cables are anchored at each end of the bridge by means of eyebars connected to structural steel sections embedded in concrete. The anchorages extend approximately 60 feet (18 m) into shafts excavated in bedrock. The cables were manufactured by the John A. Roebling's Sons Company, while the bridge's structural steel was fabricated by the American Bridge Company.

The roadway and trusses are suspended from the main cables by 1 1/4-inch (3.2 cm) galvanized steel wire ropes. An unusual feature of the design is the continuous stiffening truss, which extends across the main span and both side spans. According to David B. Steinman, the Rondout Creek Bridge was the first American suspension bridge designed with a continuous stiffening truss. (Note: The Cologne Suspension Bridge in Germany was the first large suspension bridge built without hinges; the Rondout Creek Bridge was the second. The Rondout Creek Bridge was the first American suspension bridge to employ a continuous stiffening truss; the original U.S. Grant Bridge in Portsmouth, Ohio, was the second.) The truss is 15 feet (4.6 m) deep at the towers and tapers to 10 feet (3.0 m) at the middle and ends of the bridge. The original roadway consisted of a reinforced-concrete slab that was 9 inches (23 cm) thick at its crown. The south pier is approximately 18 feet (5.5 m) higher in elevation than the north pier. The roadway has a 5 percent grade from the north anchorage to the center of the bridge and a 0.2 percent grade from the center to the south anchorage.

The bridge was designed by consulting engineers Daniel E. Moran and William H. Yates, who were responsible for the substructure and superstructure designs, respectively. Holton D. Robinson served as consulting engineer to the general contractor, Terry & Tench Company, which constructed the bridge. David B. Steinman also served as a design consultant and worked as an assistant engineer to Robinson. Charles Michaud of Kingston served as a subcontractor responsible for constructing the concrete piers and anchorages.

== In popular culture ==
The Kingston–Port Ewen Suspension Bridge has been used as a filming location for several film and television productions. The bridge appears in the 2017 film Growing Up Smith. It was prominently featured in the 2020 HBO miniseries The Undoing, serving as the setting for a car chase and the climactic confrontation in the final episode. The bridge also appears in the Apple TV+ series Severance.

== See also ==
- List of crossings of Rondout Creek
- List of bridges and tunnels on the National Register of Historic Places in New York
- National Register of Historic Places listings in Ulster County, New York
