= Sundown, New York =

- Hamlet
- Location within New York
- Coordinates: 41°53′2″N 74°28′0″W
- Country: United States
- State: New York
- County: Ulster
- Elevation: 1,024 ft (312 m)
- Time zone: UTC-5 (Eastern (EST))
  - Summer (DST): UTC-4 (EDT)

Sundown is a hamlet located within Denning, in Ulster County, New York, United States. It is 34.6 miles from the city of Kingston and 119 miles from New York City. Sundown is near the southern town line of Denning on CR 46. Sundown is near Sundown Wild Forest.
