= Kingston City Hall =

Kingston City Hall may refer to:

- Kingston City Hall (New York), the city hall in Kingston, New York, United States, listed on the National Register of Historic Places
- Kingston City Hall (Ontario), the city hall in Kingston, Ontario, Canada, and a National Historic Site of Canada
