= East Kingston =

East Kingston may refer to:

- East Kingston, New Hampshire, a town in Rockingham County, New Hampshire, United States
- East Kingston, New York, a hamlet (and census-designated place) in Ulster County, New York, United States
- East Kingston, West Sussex, a hamlet in England
- East Kingston section of Kingston, Jamaica

== See also ==
- East Kingsford, Michigan
