= Kingston City Hall (New York) =

- U.S. National Register of Historic Places
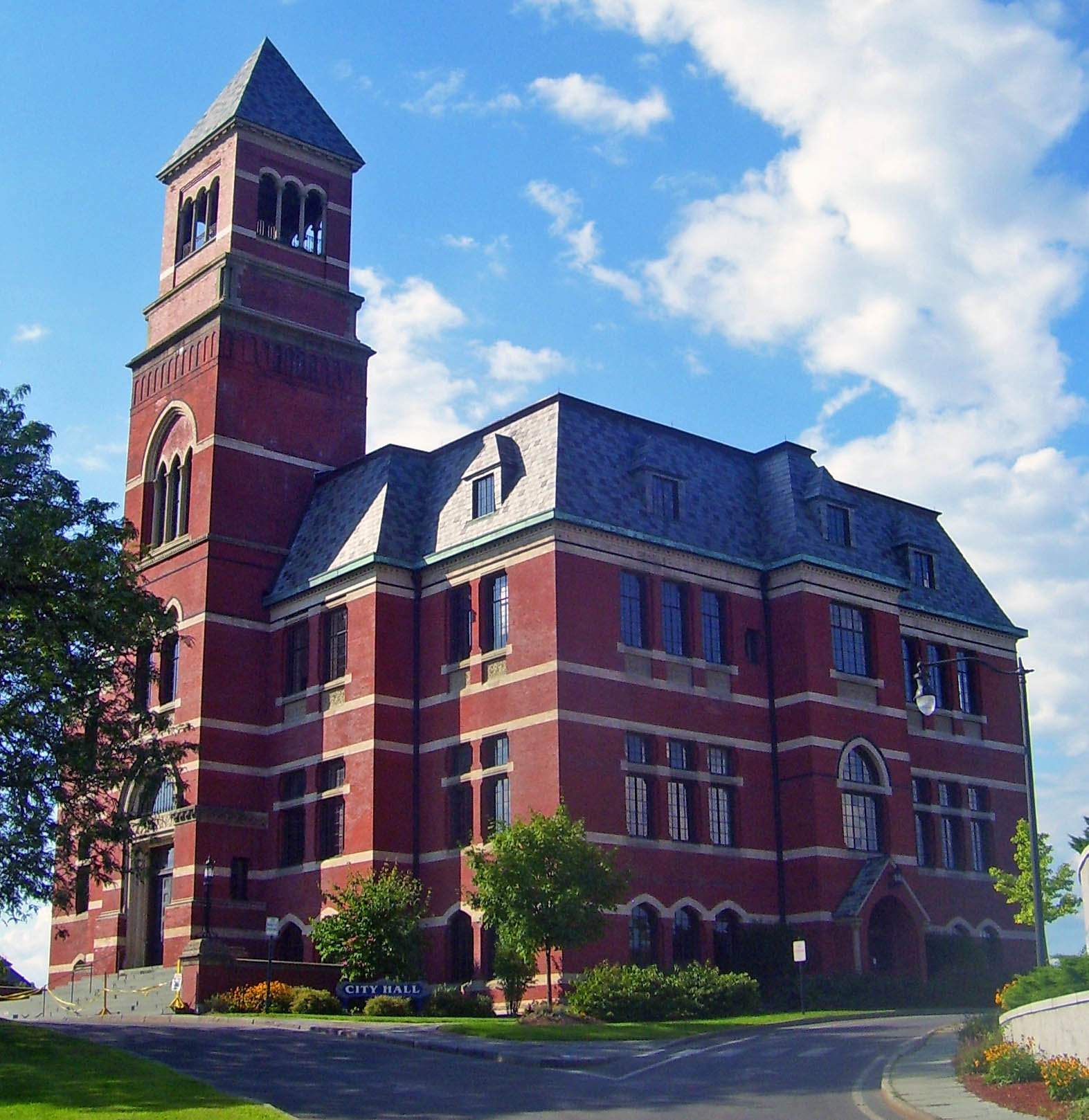
- South elevation and east profile, 2008
- Location: Kingston, NY
- Coordinates: 41°55′37″N 73°59′46″W
- Built: 1872–73
- Architect: Arthur Crooks
- Architectural style: Victorian
- NRHP reference No.: 71000563
- Added to NRHP: December 9, 1971

The City Hall building in Kingston, New York, United States, is located on Broadway in the center of the city. It is a red brick building in a late Victorian architectural style dating from 1873.

It sits on what had been the boundary between the villages of Kingston and Rondout prior to their merger to form the city of Kingston. First used for governmental purposes in 1875, its design was modified after sustaining serious damage in a 1927 fire. In 1971 it was listed on the National Register of Historic Places, the first listing in the city. The city government moved to a new building the next year, leaving the building vacant for over 20 years. After an extensive restoration in the late 20th century, the city has moved back in.

== Building ==
The city hall sits on a slight rise on the north side of Broadway, across from Kingston's high school and library. It is just west of Kingston Hospital. A semicircular driveway provides access.

It is three stories tall, capped by a mansard roof shingled in polychromatic slate with a dentiled brick cornice and a front bell tower, all atop a regular ashlar limestone foundation. There are nine bays in the front, seven on the sides and ten on the rear. The red brick facing on the load-bearing walls is decorated with buff brick coursework at the window lintel and sill levels. Sandstone spandrels are located beneath all third-story windows. Terra cotta is also used as trim.

The recessed main entrance, on the bell tower, is flanked by engaged stone columns topped with foliated capitals, rising to an arch echoed in the window treatments in the next two stages. A griffin flanks each side. Brick porches frame the secondary entrances on the east and west. Each elevation of the roof has two dormers with hipped roofs. The tower has an open belfry with iron rails and three arches, topped by a pyramidal roof.

Inside, the building has terrazzo floors. A large city council chamber, lit by chandeliers, on the upper floor seats 400.

== History ==
The villages of Kingston, Rondout and the hamlet of Wilbur merged in 1872 to form the current city of Kingston. The new city hired architect Arthur Crooks, known primarily for his churches, to design a city hall that made a bold statement about Kingston's progress and aspirations.

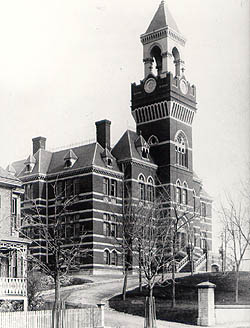
Original appearance, seen ca. 1885

Crooks was a disciple of English aestheticist John Ruskin, who had favored the revival of Italian architectural traditions in the buildings of his time. Kingston's City Hall uses many elements that Ruskin praised, in particular the polychromatic banding and towers. The building was purposely sited where the boundary between the two former villages had been, in order to symbolize the merger. It was built over two years and the city began using it for council meetings and daily business in 1875.

The original design had a complex of hipped roofs and an open belfry atop the tower. In 1927 fire destroyed the tower and severely damaged the roof. A team of architects who supervised the rebuilding changed the design to its current appearance. They also initiated major work on the interior, intended to fireproof the building. Much of this consisted of replacing structural wood with other materials. Wood flooring was replaced with terrazzo, staircases with marble, and doors were clad in metal. The chimneys were capped.

They made other major changes to the interior. The mayor's office was moved from the second floor to the first. On the third floor they built a vast council meeting room, with space for 400. More decoration was added to the walls, and ornate lights hung from the ceiling.

Kingston's industrial prosperity continued throughout the 20th century, as the city transitioned from an economy based on river commerce to one built around the IBM facility just outside the city in Lake Katrine. In the late 1960s, however, the city center began to decline commercially as more residents left the city for nearby suburban areas. The city decided to move its government to a new building near the waterfront to revitalize it, and vacated Crooks' building in 1972, a century after it had been commissioned.

Over the next two decades the empty building began to decay. Its facades crumbled, and the rich interior became filled with broken glass and rusted metal. The chandeliers had corroded due to water seepage, and the wall plastering was gradually becoming fine dust.

But it remained structurally sound, and residents fought to preserve it from demolition. Congregants at the Old Dutch Church saved the plaster lunettes depicting the city's history that had decorated the council chamber and stored them in the church's basement. Eventually, a young new mayor, T.R. Gallo, came to office sharing those concerns, in 1994. After a first term of initiatives to renew the city, he was re-elected and proposed to restore City Hall and move the government back there. Council voted to authorize a bond issue in 1998, and along with private contributions and state and federal grants a total of $6.5 million was raised and spent. The building reopened in 2000, and has been occupied since then.

== See also ==
- List of mayors of Kingston, New York
- National Register of Historic Places listings in Ulster County, New York
