= Stephen T. Hopkins =

American politician

Stephen Tyng Hopkins
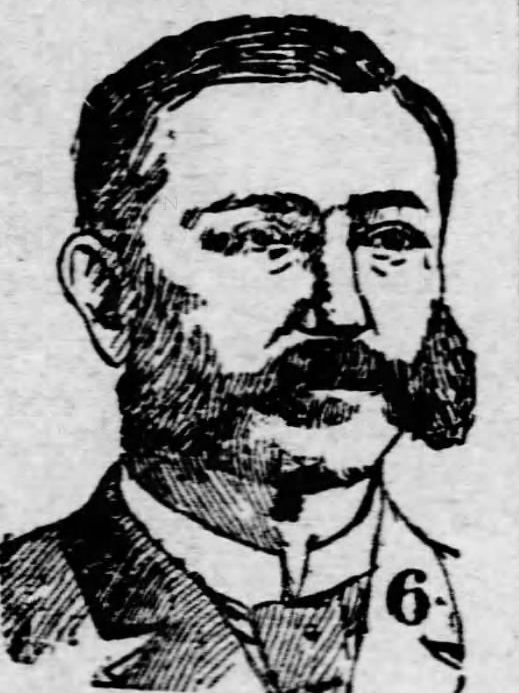
- Weekly Republican-Traveler (Arkansas City, KS), August 2, 1888

Member of the U.S. House of Representatives from New York's 17th district
- In office March 4, 1887 – March 3, 1889
- Preceded by: James G. Lindsley
- Succeeded by: Charles J. Knapp

Member of the New York State Assembly for Greene County
- In office 1885–1886
- Preceded by: Bradley S. McCabe
- Succeeded by: Francis G. Walters

Personal details
- Born: March 25, 1849 New York City, New York, U.S.
- Died: March 3, 1892 (aged 42) Pleasantville, New Jersey, U.S.
- Cause of death: Suicide by poisoning/overdose
- Resting place: Green-Wood Cemetery
- Party: Republican

Stephen Tyng Hopkins (March 25, 1849 – March 3, 1892) was a U.S. representative from New York.

== Early life and career ==
Born in New York City, Hopkins attended the Anthon Grammar School and became an iron merchant and broker.

He later moved to Catskill, and was connected with several coal and iron syndicates in West Virginia and Tennessee.

Hopkins served in the New York Militia, and was Adjutant of New York's 86th Infantry Regiment.

In 1871, Hopkins married Mary Warner Munn, (died January 28, 1887). Their children included Louis Davis Hopkins (born January 24, 1874), a New York City businessman.

A Republican, he was a member of the New York State Assembly (Greene County) in 1885 and 1886. As an Assemblyman he was identified with the Stalwart Republicans, and was accused of using some of his children's inheritance to buy legislators' votes for Levi P. Morton during the 1887 election to succeed Warner Miller.

Hopkins was elected to the Fiftieth Congress (March 4, 1887 – March 3, 1889). During his congressional term, there were reports that he was behaving erratically, and observers presumed that he was mentally ill or drinking excessively in response to the death of his wife.

After leaving Congress, he was a Watchman in the New York Custom House from April to August 1890.

== Death and burial ==
He was found dead by a train crew alongside the railroad tracks near Pleasantville, adjacent to Atlantic City, New Jersey on March 3, 1892. He had apparently traveled to Atlantic City following medical treatment for alcoholism at a facility in White Plains, New York. The circumstances of his death were unclear, although observers indicated that based on the condition of his body when it was found, he did not appear to have fallen or been thrown from a train. Because he had not been robbed and there were no signs that he had been murdered, Hopkins was presumed to have committed suicide by poison or drug overdose because of business reverses and alcoholism.

He was interred in Green-Wood Cemetery, Brooklyn, New York.

New York State Assembly
Preceded by Bradley S. McCabe	New York State Assembly; Greene County; 1885–1886	Succeeded by Francis G. Walters
U.S. House of Representatives
Preceded by James G. Lindsley	Member of the U.S. House of Representatives from New York's 17th congressional district 1887–1889	Succeeded by Charles J. Knapp
