= Lincoln Park, New York =

- CDP
- Location in Ulster County and the state of New York.
- Coordinates: 41°57′5″N 73°59′40″W
- Country: United States
- State: New York
- County: Ulster

Area
  - Total: 1.56 sq mi (4.04 km^{2})
  - Land: 1.53 sq mi (3.96 km^{2})
  - Water: 0.031 sq mi (0.08 km^{2})
- Elevation: 187 ft (57 m)

Population (2020)
  - Total: 2,545
  - Density: 1,663.0/sq mi (642.08/km^{2})
- Time zone: UTC-5 (EST)
  - Summer (DST): UTC-4 (EDT)
- FIPS code: 36-42488
- GNIS feature ID: 0955377

Lincoln Park is a hamlet (and census-designated place) in Ulster County, New York, United States. The population was 2,545 at the 2020 census.

Lincoln Park is in the southern part of the Town of Ulster, adjacent to the northern city boundary of the City of Kingston.

== Demographics ==
Historical population
Census	Pop.	Note	%±
2000	2,337		—
2010	2,366		1.2%
2020	2,545		7.6%
U.S. Decennial Census

=== 2020 census ===
As of the 2020 census, Lincoln Park had a population of 2,545. The median age was 48.6 years. 14.7% of residents were under the age of 18 and 25.8% of residents were 65 years of age or older. For every 100 females there were 85.1 males, and for every 100 females age 18 and over there were 81.7 males age 18 and over.

100.0% of residents lived in urban areas, while 0.0% lived in rural areas.

There were 1,180 households in Lincoln Park, of which 18.6% had children under the age of 18 living in them. Of all households, 30.3% were married-couple households, 20.8% were households with a male householder and no spouse or partner present, and 40.9% were households with a female householder and no spouse or partner present. About 46.7% of all households were made up of individuals and 26.7% had someone living alone who was 65 years of age or older.

There were 1,297 housing units, of which 9.0% were vacant. The homeowner vacancy rate was 2.0% and the rental vacancy rate was 6.4%.

Racial composition as of the 2020 census
Race	Number	Percent
White	2,003	78.7%
Black or African American	198	7.8%
American Indian and Alaska Native	6	0.2%
Asian	59	2.3%
Native Hawaiian and Other Pacific Islander	2	0.1%
Some other race	99	3.9%
Two or more races	178	7.0%
Hispanic or Latino (of any race)	210	8.3%

=== 2000 census ===
At the 2000 census, there were 2,337 people, 1,064 households and 619 families residing in the CDP. The population density was 1,716.7 inhabitants per square mile (662.8/km^{2}). There were 1,114 housing units at an average density of 818.3 per square mile (315.9/km^{2}). The racial makeup of the CDP was 93.37% White, 3.34% African American, 0.30% Native American, 1.50% Asian, 0.04% Pacific Islander, 0.30% from other races, and 1.16% from two or more races. Hispanic or Latino of any race were 2.57% of the population.

There were 1,064 households, of which 24.2% had children under the age of 18 living with them, 43.7% were married couples living together, 10.2% had a female householder with no husband present, and 41.8% were non-families. 36.7% of all households were made up of individuals, and 21.3% had someone living alone who was 65 years of age or older. The average household size was 2.18 and the average family size was 2.86.

20.6% of the population were under the age of 18, 6.7% from 18 to 24, 28.2% from 25 to 44, 21.4% from 45 to 64, and 23.2% who were 65 years of age or older. The median age was 42 years. For every 100 females there were 84.5 males. For every 100 females age 18 and over, there were 80.0 males.

The median household income was $34,583 and the median family income was $44,279. Males had a median income of $35,000 compared with $24,769 for females. The per capita income for the CDP was $19,863. About 10.2% of families and 12.9% of the population were below the poverty line, including 26.6% of those under age 18 and 13.4% of those age 65 or over.

== Education ==
The school district for the CDP is Kingston City School District. The comprehensive high school of the Kingston City district is Kingston High School.
