= Newark Lime and Cement Company =

The Newark Lime & Cement Company was a firm based in Kingston, New York. Its full name was the Newark Lime & Cement Manufacturing Company, and it was described as being in Rondout, New York, the port on the Hudson River serving Kingston, and which became part of Kingston in 1872

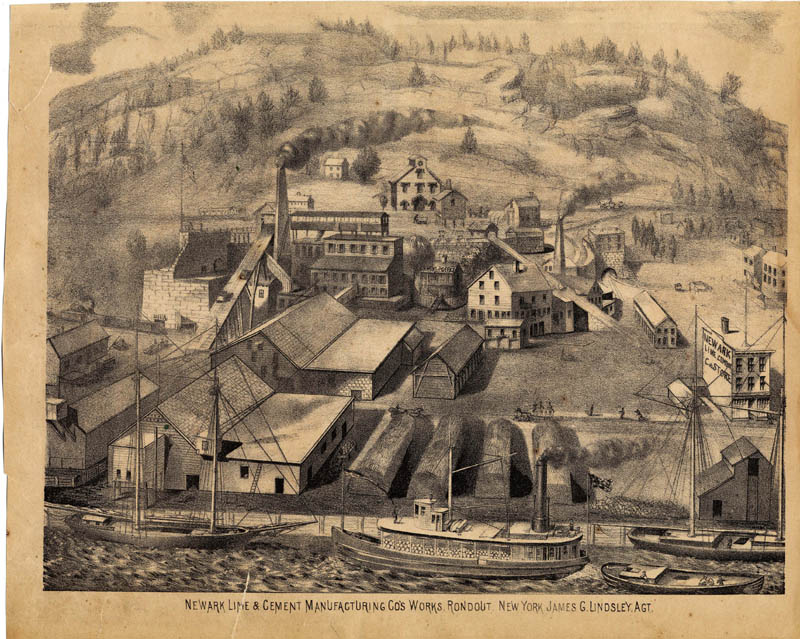
c.1875 view of Newark Lime & Cement Manufacturing Company's works, Rondout, New York

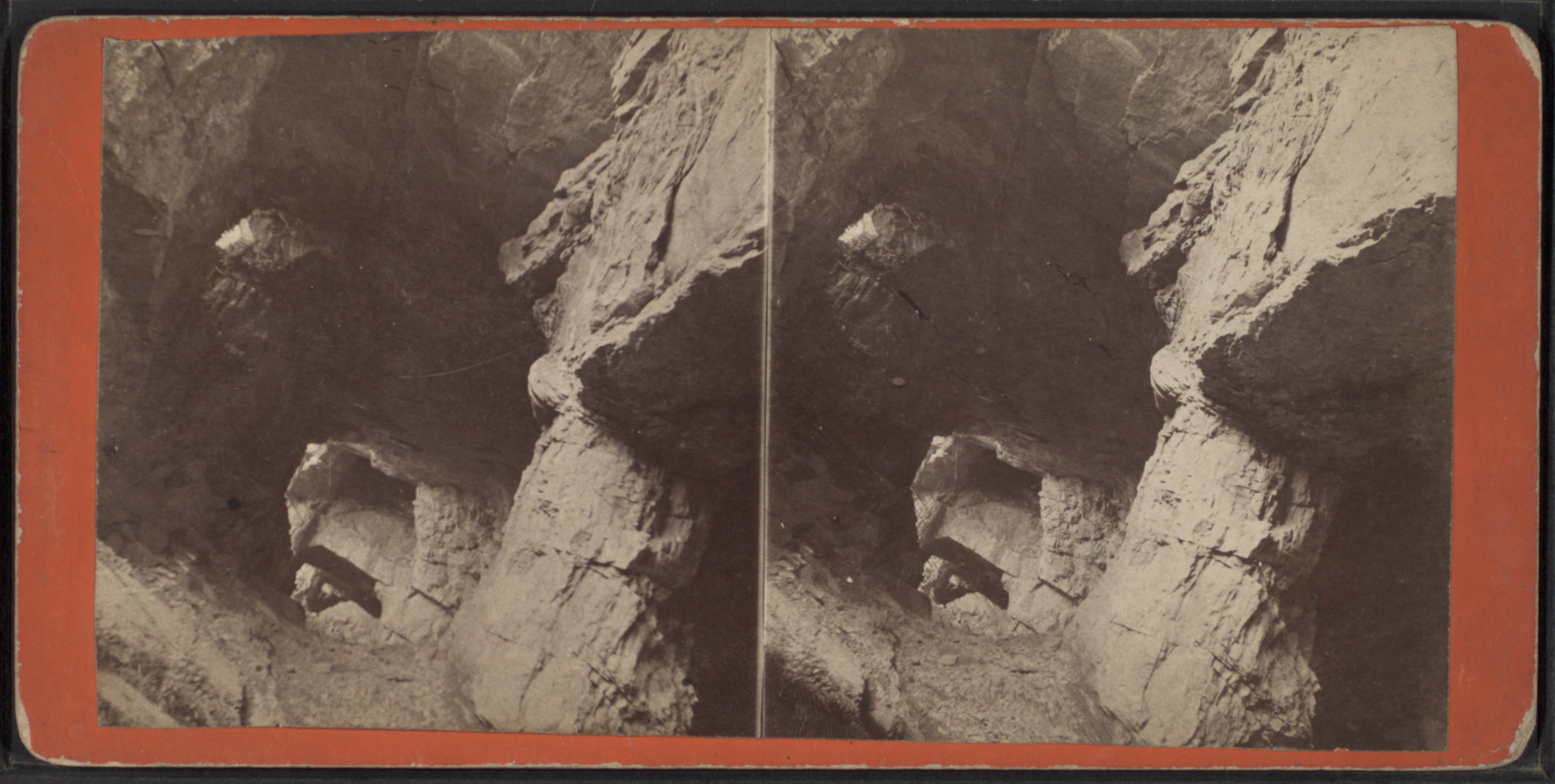
Stereoscopic view of a cement quarry near Rondout, Kingston, New York

It was Kingston's largest manufacturing establishment in the 1880s; it closed in 1905.

According to Hamilton Child, the Newark Lime and Cement Manufacturing Company was the most important manufacturing establishment in Rondout, and began operation in spring 1851. The company owned 250 acres including waterfront on the channel of the Rondout Creek. The Rondout Manufactory alone produced 227,516 barrels. The works consisted of twenty-one kilns for burning the stone, two mill buildings, four storehouses, capable of storing upwards of 20,000 barrels, a cooperage establishment, millwrights', wheelwrights', blacksmiths', and carpenters' shops, barns stables. Stone, from which the cement was made, was quarried from the hill immediately in the rear of the factory, and was obtained by tunneling and sinking shafts, from which extend galleries in the stratum of cement rock, which inclines to the north-west. An extensive system of railways transported the stone from the quarries to the top of the kilns, where it was burned by being mixed with culm or fine coal, and then passed by a series of descents through the various stages of manufacture till it arrived in barrels at the wharf ready for shipment. As the cement manufactured often exceeded 1,000 barrels per day, the deficiency in barrels was supplied from the stock accumulated during the season when navigation was closed, and the manufacture of cement necessarily suspended. The number of men employed varied from 250 to 300.

Its area of mining included part of what is now Hasbrouck Park.

James Girard Lindsley was its general manager.

One artifact of the company is the ruin of its former mule barn, at the end of Yeomans St. The mule barn was built around 1870.
