= Isaac N. Cox =

American politician

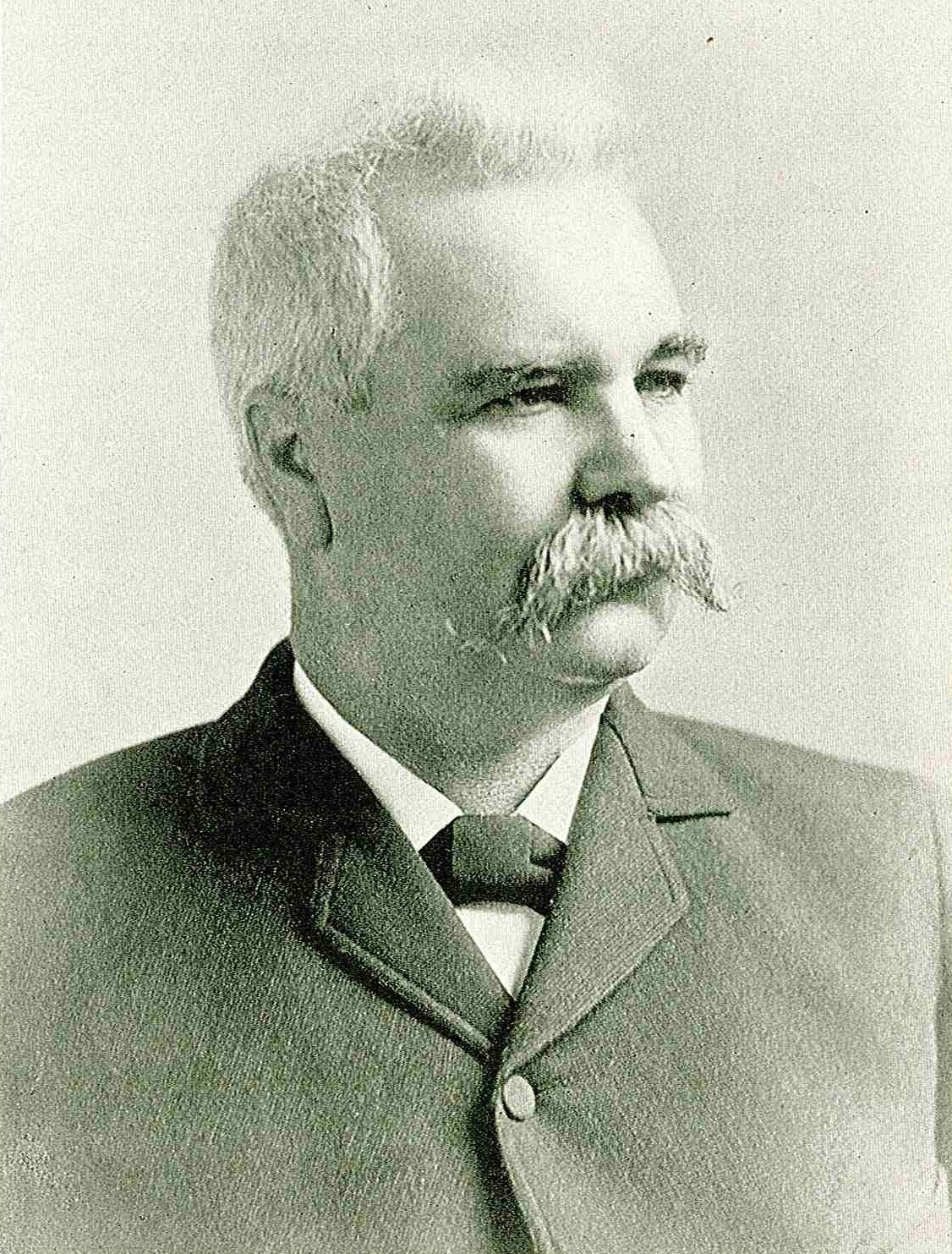

Member of the U.S. House of Representatives from New York's 17th district
- In office March 4, 1891 – March 3, 1893
- Preceded by: Charles J. Knapp
- Succeeded by: Francis Marvin

Personal details
- Born: August 1, 1846 Fallsburg, New York
- Died: September 28, 1916 (aged 70) Ellenville, New York
- Party: Democratic Party

Isaac Newton Cox (August 1, 1846 – September 28, 1916) was an American businessman and politician who served one term as a U.S. representative from New York from 1891 to 1893

== Biography ==
Born in Fallsburg, New York, Cox moved to Ellenville in 1864 and engaged in the lumber business. Supervisor of the town of Wawarsing in 1875 and 1883–1886 and served as chairman of the board during the last year. He served four years on the Democratic State committee. He was appointed by President Grover Cleveland chairman of the commission to examine and report upon the condition of the Northern Pacific Railroad in 1886.

=== Tenure in Congress ===
Cox was elected as a Democrat to the Fifty-second Congress (March 4, 1891 – March 3, 1893). He was an unsuccessful candidate for reelection in 1892 to the Fifty-third Congress.

=== Later career and death ===
He was appointed a member of the State commission on fisheries, and served from 1894 to 1899. He engaged in mercantile pursuits, lumbering, and banking in Ellenville, New York, where he died in 1916. He was interred in Fantinekill Cemetery.

U.S. House of Representatives
Preceded by Charles J. Knapp	Member of the U.S. House of Representatives from New York's 17th congressional district 1891–1893	Succeeded by Francis Marvin
