= Henry P. Alexander =

American politician (1801–1867)

Henry Porteous Alexander

Member of the U.S. House of Representatives from New York's 17th district
- In office March 4, 1849 – March 3, 1851
- Preceded by: George Petrie
- Succeeded by: Alexander H. Buell

Personal details
- Born: September 13, 1801 Little Falls, New York
- Died: February 22, 1867 (aged 65) Little Falls, New York
- Citizenship: United States
- Party: Whig
- Profession: banker; politician

Henry Porteous Alexander (September 13, 1801 – February 22, 1867) was an American banker and politician who served one term in the United States House of Representatives, representing New York.

== Biography ==
Born in Little Falls, New York, Alexander was the son of William and Catherine Mary Porteous Alexander and attended the public schools.

== Career ==
Alexander engaged in mercantile pursuits as well as banking. He served as president of the village of Little Falls in 1834 and 1835. Becoming president of the Herkimer County Bank at Little Falls in 1839, he served in that capacity until his death. He was an unsuccessful candidate for election in 1846 to the Thirtieth Congress.

Elected as a Whig to the Thirty-first Congress, Alexander represented the seventeenth district of New York from March 4, 1849, to March 3, 1851. He was an unsuccessful candidate for reelection in 1850 to the Thirty-second Congress, and resumed his former business pursuits.

== Death ==
Alexander died in Little Falls, New York, on February 22, 1867 (age 65 years, 162 days). He is interred at Church Street Cemetery, Little Falls, New York.

U.S. House of Representatives
Preceded by George Petrie	Representative of the 17th Congressional District of New York; March 4, 1849 – March 3, 1851	Succeeded by Alexander H. Buell
