= Ulster, New York =

Town of Ulster
- Town
- Location in Ulster County and the state of New York.

- Location within the state of New York
- Coordinates: 41°57′38″N 74°0′39″W
- Country: United States
- State: New York
- County: Ulster
- Town: November 28, 1879

Government
  - Type: Council
  - Supervisor: James E. Quigley III (R)

Area
  - Total: 28.88 sq mi (74.81 km^{2})
  - Land: 26.81 sq mi (69.43 km^{2})
  - Water: 2.08 sq mi (5.38 km^{2})
- Elevation: 161 ft (49 m)

Population (2020)
  - Total: 12,660
  - Density: 472.3/sq mi (182.3/km^{2})
- Time zone: UTC-5 (Eastern (EST))
  - Summer (DST): UTC-4 (EDT)
- ZIP: 12449, 12487
- Area codes: 766, 921
- FIPS code: 36-75935
- GNIS feature ID: 0979569
- Website: www.townofulster.ny.gov

Ulster is a town in Ulster County, New York, United States. The population was 12,660 at the 2020 census.

The town of Ulster is in the northeastern part of the county. The town is directly north of the city of Kingston. Ulster is partially situated inside Catskill Park.

The New York State Thruway (Interstate 87) and U.S. Route 9W pass through the western part of the town. U.S. Route 209 crosses the Hudson River from the eastern side of the town.

== History ==
The town of Ulster, newest of the twenty towns in the county, was created by the Ulster County Board of Supervisors on November 28, 1879, with land taken from the town of Kingston. Formed in protest to what was considered political misrule by the authorities of the town of Kingston, the action of the supervisors was soon ratified by the state legislature. The first meeting of the town of Ulster was held in the hotel of George A. Stoddard on March 2, 1880. James Myer Jr. was its first supervisor. The new town contained approximately 27.5 square miles of land. It was bordered the city of Kingston on three sides, and by the Hudson River and the towns of Kingston, Saugerties, Hurley, Woodstock, and Rosendale. Rondout Creek separated Ulster from the town of Esopus to the south.

"While the establishment of Ulster solved the problem of political corruption in the parent town of Kingston, another problem was inadvertently created. When the boundaries of Ulster were established, it was obvious just how severe the punishment of the town of Kingston had been: the new town had Eddyville with the Delaware and Hudson Canal terminus lock, the land bordering the Hudson with its icehouses and brickyards and all the advantages for trade and travel, the flat farm land of the Saugerties Road and the Brabant with its road leading into the interior. The Esopus Creek with all the potential for mills was locate within the new town. Finding a centrum or hub around which the township could unite was virtually impossible as it was little more than a collection of hamlets bound together by only a legislative act." (Burgher manuscript)

Although the new town lacked a geographic center, Eddyville was its economic hub. Named for George Eddy, a mill owner whose family established a cotton mill and a sawmill on the Rondout, Eddyville became a thriving hamlet in large part due to the Delaware and Hudson Canal.

Present East Kingston was first called Flatbush. Originally named by the Esopus tribe of the Lenape, the Dutch later called it "Vlakke Basch". It became the site of cement works, ice houses and brickyards, and became second only to Eddyville in significance in the newly-formed Town of Ulster. Present Rider Park and Post Park are on former brickyards.

The hamlet of Lake Katrine bears the name of the nearby lake. The lake was first called Auntrens Pond, and the area nearby was first called Pine Bush.

Bluestone quarrying was the main industry in Ruby, which was known as both Dutch and German settlement in earlier times.

"The township remained primarily rural and agricultural until the post World War II years when so much happened so quickly and Ulster had to move into the 20th century ready or not. A major corporation, IBM, opened its Kingston facility. The economy of Ulster, the city of Kingston and neighboring towns changed irreversibly as housing developments sprang up, schools were built and other businesses arrived." (Burgher manuscript)

The town of Ulster is noted as being the "business hub" of Ulster County. Many historical sites dot the landscape.

In 1999, Lisa Groppuso was the first female supervisor, elected on the Democratic ticket. Groppuso had previously served four two-year terms (1990–1998) as town clerk.

In 2005 Ulster voters elected 21-year-old Nicky B. Woerner as the youngest town supervisor in New York State history, and elected the first Democratic town board in the town's history.

== Geography ==
According to the United States Census Bureau, the town has a total area of 28.9 square miles (75 km^{2}), of which 26.8 square miles (69 km^{2}) is land and 2.1 square miles (5.4 km^{2}) (7.20%) is water.

The eastern town line is formed by the Hudson River, and the western section of the town borders the City of Kingston.

Esopus Creek flows northward through the center of the town.

== Demographics ==
Historical population
Census	Pop.	Note	%±
1880	2,806		—
1890	3,222		14.8%
1900	3,582		11.2%
1910	3,554		−0.8%
1920	2,622		−26.2%
1930	3,597		37.2%
1940	3,993		11.0%
1950	4,411		10.5%
1960	8,448		91.5%
1970	11,711		38.6%
1980	12,319		5.2%
1990	12,329		0.1%
2000	12,540		1.7%
2010	12,327		−1.7%
2020	12,660		2.7%
U.S. Decennial Census

=== 2020 census ===
As of the 2020 United States census, there were 12,660 people. 79.2% were white, 9.9% were of two or more races, 4.8% were African American, 2% were Asian, and 1% were Native American. Hispanic or Latino people of any race were 9.7% of the population.

=== 2010 census ===
As of the 2010 United States census, there were 12,327 people. 90.2% were white, 3.1% were African American, 0.3% were Native American, 2.2% were Asian, 0.0% were Pacific Islander and 2.6% were of two or more races. Hispanic or Latino people of any race were 5.4% of the population.

=== 2000 census ===
As of the 2000 United States census, there were 12,544 people, 4,850 households, and 3,278 families in the town. The population density was 467.9/sqmi (180.7/km^{2}). There were 5,239 housing units at an average density of 195.4/sqmi (75.5/km^{2}). The racial makeup of the town was 93.44% white, 2.89% African American, .17% Native American, 1.56% Asian, .06% Pacific Islander, .36% from other races, and 1.52% from two or more races. Hispanic or Latino of any race were 2.45% of the population.

There were 4,850 households, out of which 30.5% had children under the age of 18 living with them, 52.2% were married couples living together, 10.7% had a female householder with no husband present, and 32.4% were non-families. 26.8% of all households were made up of individuals, and 12.4% had someone living alone who was 65 years of age or older. The average household size was 2.44 and the average family size was 2.96.

The town population contained 23.5% under the age of 18, 6.3% from 18 to 24, 28.1% from 25 to 44, 24.4% from 45 to 64, and 17.7% who were 65 years of age or older. The median age was 40 years. For every 100 female people, there were 91.5 male people. For every 100 female people age 18 and over, there were 87.9 male people.

The median income for a household in the town was $43,707, and the median income for a family was $51,095. Males had a median income of $38,655 versus $26,146 for females. The per capita income for the town was $22,069. About 5.9% of families and 9.0% of the population were below the poverty line, including 11.2% of those under age 18 and 7.9% of those age 65 or over.

== Communities and locations in the Town of Ulster ==
- East Kingston
- Eddyville
- Flatbush
- Glenerie Lake Park
- Lake Katrine (the town hall of Ulster is in this hamlet)
- Lincoln Park
- Ruby
- Ulster Landing
- Whittier

The now-defunct hamlet of Dutch Settlement is also listed in the official New York State Gazetteer, maintained and published by the New York State Department of Health, which includes numerous defunct hamlets and towns, some with alternate or archaic spellings.

== Government ==
The town government consists of a supervisor, a deputy supervisor, four council members, a clerk, and two justices.

== Notable people ==
- Walter B. Gibson - author from 1966 to 1985
- Elissa Landi - actress (1904–1948). Elisa Landi Drive was named in her honor.
- Abraham J. Palmer (1847–1922)
- David Provost - mayor of New York City from 1699 to 1700
