= Westel Willoughby Jr. =

American politician (1769–1844)

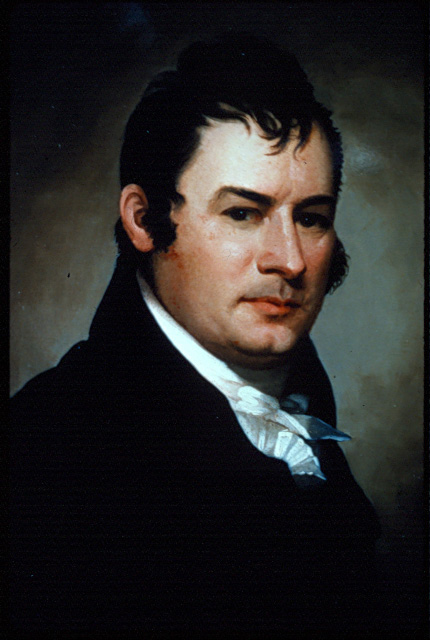
- Willoughby (c. 1834)

Member of the U.S. House of Representatives from New York's 17th district
- In office December 13, 1815 – March 4, 1817
- Preceded by: William Stephens Smith
- Succeeded by: Thomas H. Hubbard

Personal details
- Born: November 20, 1769 Goshen, Connecticut, British America
- Died: October 3, 1844 (aged 74) Newport, New York, U.S.
- Resting place: First Baptist Church Cemetery
- Education: Columbia University
- Occupation: Politician; physician

Westel Willoughby Jr. (November 20, 1769 – October 3, 1844) was a physician and politician from New York. He served as a U.S. Representative from New York from 1815 to 1817.

== Early life and education ==
Westel Willoughby Jr. was born on November 20, 1769, in Goshen, Connecticut. He studied medicine, received his license to practice, and moved to Newport, New York.

Despite already having been licensed to practice medicine since age 20, in 1812 Willoughby attended a course of medical lectures at Columbia University, and was awarded the honorary degree of Doctor of Medicine.

== Career ==
=== Medical career ===
Willoughby served as president of the Herkimer County Medical Society from 1806 to 1816 and 1818 to 1836. He served as president of the College of Physicians and Surgeons now the State University of New York Upstate Medical University, from 1812 to 1844. He served as member of the medical staff of the New York Militia and was a veteran of the War of 1812.

Willoughby practiced in Herkimer County and was one of the founders of the College of Physicians and Surgeons in Fairfield, where he served as professor of obstetrics.

=== Political career ===
Willoughby served in the New York State Assembly in 1808 and 1809. In 1814 he ran for the United States House as a Democratic Republican, and appeared to be defeated by William S. Smith. Willoughby successfully contested the results and was seated for the remainder of the 14th United States Congress, December 13, 1815 to March 3, 1817. Willoughby was appointed judge of the court of common pleas of Herkimer County in 1805 and served until 1821.

== Legacy ==
The town of Willoughby, Ohio was named for Dr. Willoughby, as was the Willoughby Medical College (now a part of The Ohio State University College of Medicine).

Willoughby died on October 3, 1844, in Newport, New York. He was interred in the First Baptist Church Cemetery.

U.S. House of Representatives
Preceded by William Stephens Smith	Member of the U.S. House of Representatives from New York's 17th congressional district 1815-1817	Succeeded by Thomas H. Hubbard
