= Ruby, New York =

- Hamlet and CDP
- Location within New York Location within the United States
- Coordinates: 42°01′05″N 74°00′53″W
- Country: United States
- State: New York
- County: Ulster
- Town: Ulster

Area
  - Total: 0.70 sq mi (1.82 km^{2})
  - Land: 0.70 sq mi (1.81 km^{2})
  - Water: 0.0012 sq mi (0.003 km^{2})
- Elevation: 312 ft (95 m)

Population (2020)
  - Total: 918
  - Density: 1,313.6/sq mi (507.18/km^{2})
- Time zone: UTC-5 (EST)
  - Summer (DST): UTC-4 (EDT)
- ZIP code: 12475
- Area code: 845
- GNIS feature ID: 963066

Ruby is a hamlet (and census-designated place) in Ulster County, New York, United States. The community is 6.3 miles (10.1 km) north of Kingston in the town of Ulster. Ruby has a post office with ZIP code 12475, which opened on June 2, 1896. The population was 918 at the 2020 census.

One-time major league baseball player Dutch Schirick was born in Ruby on June 15, 1890. In 1921, he organized the semi-professional Kingston Colonels team. Schirick went on to become a Supreme Court judge in Kingston.

The Roman Catholic Church of St. Wendelinus was founded as a mission station of St. Peter's in Rondoubt. By 1914, it had become a mission of St. Ann's in Sawkill. At that time, the congregation, of English and German descent, numbered approximately 60.

== Geography ==
According to the United States Census Bureau, the CDP has a total area of 0.701 square miles (3.1 km^{2}), of which 0.7 square miles (2.5 km^{2}) is land and 0.001 square mile (0.6 km^{2}) (0.14%) is water.

== Demographics ==
Historical population
Census	Pop.	Note	%±
2020	918		—
U.S. Decennial Census

=== 2020 census ===
As of the 2020 census, the population was 918. The racial makeup of the town was 87.69% White, 2.07% Black or African American, 0.00% Native American, 1.42% Asian, 0.00% Pacific Islander, 2.40% from other races, and 6.43% from two or more races. Hispanic or Latino of any race were 6.43% of the population.

== Education ==
The school district for most of the CDP is Kingston City School District. A portion of the CDP is in Saugerties Central School District. The comprehensive high school of the Kingston City district is Kingston High School. The comprehensive high school of the Saugerties district is Saugerties High School.
