= Bishop Perkins =

American politician

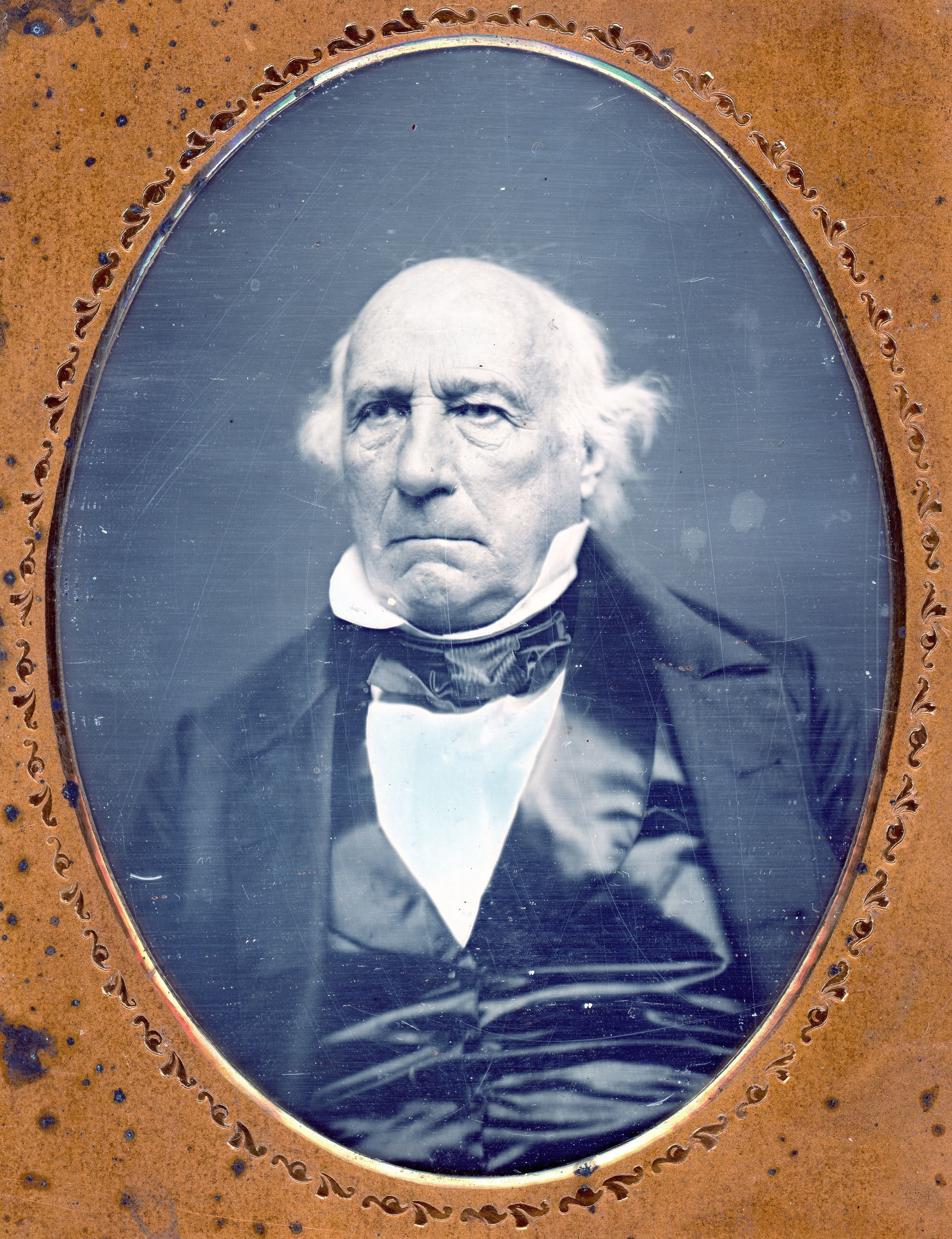

Member of the U.S. House of Representatives from New York's 17th district
- In office March 4, 1853 – March 3, 1855

Personal details
- Born: Becket, Massachusetts; September 5, 1787
- Died: November 20, 1866 (aged 79) Ogdensburg, New York
- Party: Democratic
- Education: Williams College
- Occupation: Lawyer

Bishop Perkins (September 5, 1787 in Becket, Massachusetts – November 20, 1866 in Ogdensburg, New York) was an American lawyer and politician who served one term as a United States representative from New York from 1853 to 1855.

== Biography ==
He graduated from Williams College in 1807. He studied law, and was admitted to the bar in 1812, commencing practice in Lisbon, New York. He subsequently moved to Ogdensburg, New York and continued the practice of law. He was clerk of the board of supervisors of St. Lawrence County from 1820 to 1852, and was appointed district attorney of St. Lawrence County on February 24, 1821, and served until May 21, 1840.

=== Political career ===
Perkins was a member of the State constitutional convention in 1846 and a member of the New York State Assembly in 1846, 1847, and again in 1849.

==== Congress ====
He was elected as a Democrat to the Thirty-third Congress, serving from March 4, 1853 – March 3, 1855.

He was not a candidate for renomination in 1854.

=== Later career and death ===
After leaving office, he returned to Ogdensburg, where he continued the practice of law until his death there in 1866, aged 79; interment was in Ogdensburg Cemetery.

U.S. House of Representatives
| Preceded by Alexander H. Buell | Member of the U.S. House of Representatives from New York's 17th congressional district March 4, 1853 – March 3, 1855 | Succeeded by Francis E. Spinner |
