= Alexander H. Buell =

American politician

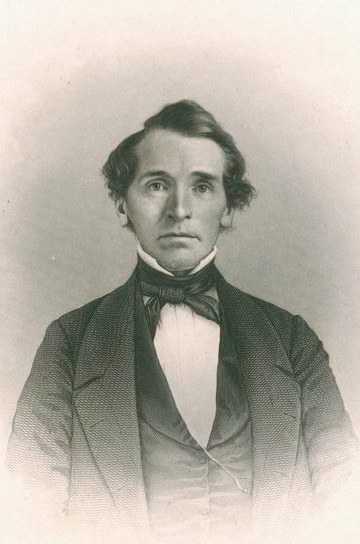

Member of the U.S. House of Representatives from New York's 17th district
- In office March 4, 1851 – January 29, 1853
- Preceded by: Henry P. Alexander
- Succeeded by: Bishop Perkins

New York State Assembly
- In office 1845–1845

Personal details
- Born: July 14, 1801 Fairfield, New York
- Died: January 29, 1853 (aged 51) Washington, D.C.
- Party: Democratic
- Occupation: owner of general stores

Alexander Hamilton Buell (July 14, 1801 – January 29, 1853) was an American businessman and politician who served one term as a U.S. representative from New York from 1851 to 1853.

== Biography ==
Born in Fairfield, New York, Buell attended the local district schools and Fairfield Academy. He engaged in mercantile pursuits in Fairfield, and maintained general stores in other cities. He served as a member of the New York State Assembly in 1845.

=== Congress ===
Buell was elected as a Democrat to the Thirty-second Congress and served from March 4, 1851, until his death in Washington, D.C., on January 29, 1853.

He was interred in the Episcopal Cemetery, Fairfield, New York.

== See also ==
- List of members of the United States Congress who died in office (1790–1899)

U.S. House of Representatives
Preceded by Henry P. Alexander	Representative from New York's 17th congressional district March 4, 1851 – January 29, 1853	Succeeded by Bishop Perkins
