= List of mayors of Kingston, New York =

The following is a list of mayors of the city of Kingston, New York, United States.

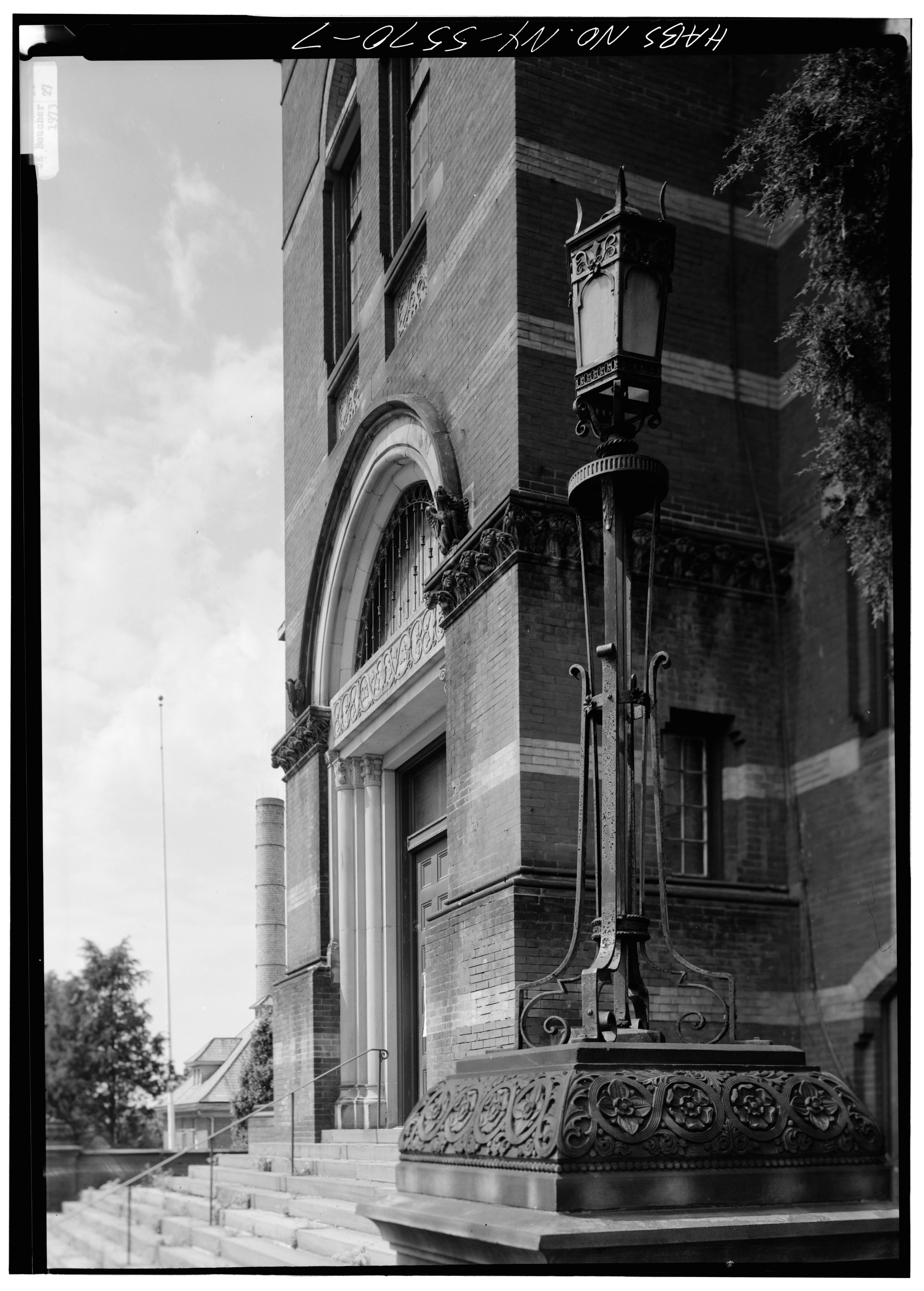
Former city hall building in Kingston, New York (photo 1973)

- James Girard Lindsley, 1872-1877
- William Lounsbery, 1878-1879
- Charles Bray, c.1880-1885
- John E. Kraft, c.1890
- David Kennedy, 1892-1895
- Henry E. Wieber, c.1896
- James E. Phinney, 1899-1900
- Morris Block, c.1902-1905
- A. W. Thompson, c.1906-1907
- Walter P. Crane, c.1908, 1922
- Roscoe Irwin, c.1910-1911
- Palmer Canfield Jr., c.1914-1921
- Morris Block, c.1925-1926
- Edgar J. Dempsey, c.1926-1931
- Eugene B. Carey, c.1932-1933
- Harry B. Walker, c.1934
- Conrad J. Heiselman, c.1934-1941
- William F. Edelmuth, c.1942-1947
- Oscar V. Newkirk, c.1948-1953
- Frederick H. Stang, c.1954-1957
- Edwin F. Radel, c.1959
- John Schwenk 1960 Raymond W. Garraghan, c.1966
- Frank Koenig, 1970-1979
- Donald E. Quick, 1980-1983
- Richard A. White Sr., 1986-1989
- John P. Heitzman, c.1991
- John A. Amarello, c.1992
- T.R. Gallo, 1994-2002
- James Sottile, 2002-2011
- Shayne Gallo, c.2012
- Steve Noble, 2016-present

== See also ==
- Kingston City Hall (New York)
- History of Kingston, New York
