= New York's 17th congressional district =

U.S. House district for New York

- Interactive map of district boundaries since January 3, 2025
- Representative: Mike Lawler; R–Pearl River
- Distribution: 98.40% urban; 1.60% rural
- Population (2025): 792,418
- Median household income: $126,185
- Ethnicity: 64.4% White; 19.9% Hispanic; 7.1% Black; 5.0% Asian; 2.7% Two or more races; 0.9% other
- Cook PVI: D+1

New York's 17th congressional district is a congressional district for the United States House of Representatives located in the lower Hudson Valley of southern New York. It includes all of Rockland County and Putnam County, as well as most of Northern Westchester County, and portions of southern Dutchess County. It is represented by Republican Mike Lawler.

Mondaire Jones was first elected in 2020 to succeed the retiring Representative Nita Lowey. In the aftermath of the 2020 redistricting cycle, 18th district incumbent Sean Patrick Maloney announced his intention to run in the new 17th district instead of his existing seat; Jones subsequently opted to run in the 10th district to avoid a primary fight. However, Maloney lost to Republican Mike Lawler in the general election; Lawler subsequently became the first of his party to win this seat since 1986. Lawler's victory gained significant attention due to Maloney's position as chairman of the Democratic Congressional Campaign Committee; Maloney became the first chairman in over 40 years to lose reelection. Lawler would later lose to Cait Conley after conceding in the 2026 election.

The district has a significant Jewish population, including conservative Hasidic communities in Rockland County.

With a Cook Partisan Voting Index (Cook PVI) rating of D+1, it is one of three congressional districts nationwide with a Democratic Cook PVI rating but a Republican representative; the others are Nebraska's 2nd congressional district (represented by Don Bacon) and Pennsylvania's 1st congressional district (represented by Brian Fitzpatrick) who have Cook PVI ratings of D+3 and D+1, respectively. These three were also the only districts that voted for Kamala Harris in the 2024 presidential election while also electing a Republican in the concurrent House of Representatives elections. It is the sixth wealthiest congressional district in New York state and 23rd wealthiest in the United States, with 28.5 percent of households earning over $200,000, per a 2024 study.

== Recent election results from statewide races ==
Year	Office	Results
2008	President	Obama 53% - 46%
2012	President	Obama 53% - 47%
2016	President	Clinton 52% - 44%
2016	Senate	Schumer 63% - 35%
2018	Senate	Gillibrand 60% - 40%
2018	Governor	Cuomo 54% - 43%
2018	Attorney General	James 57% - 40%
2020	President	Biden 54% - 44%
2022	Senate	Schumer 52% - 48%
2022	Governor	Zeldin 52% - 48%
2022	Attorney General	James 50.4% - 49.6%
2022	Comptroller	DiNapoli 52% - 48%
2024	President	Harris 50% - 49%
2024	Senate	Gillibrand 55% - 45%

== History ==
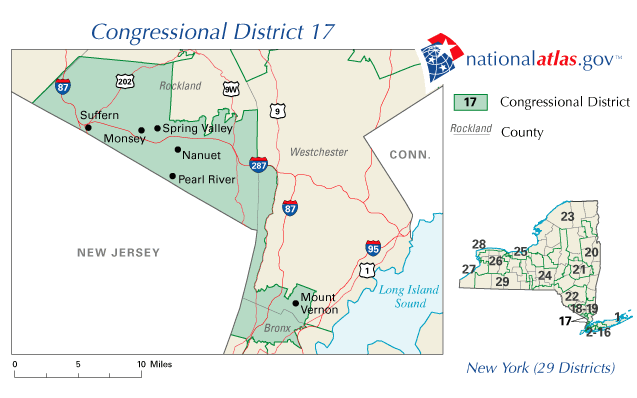
The district from 2003 to 2013

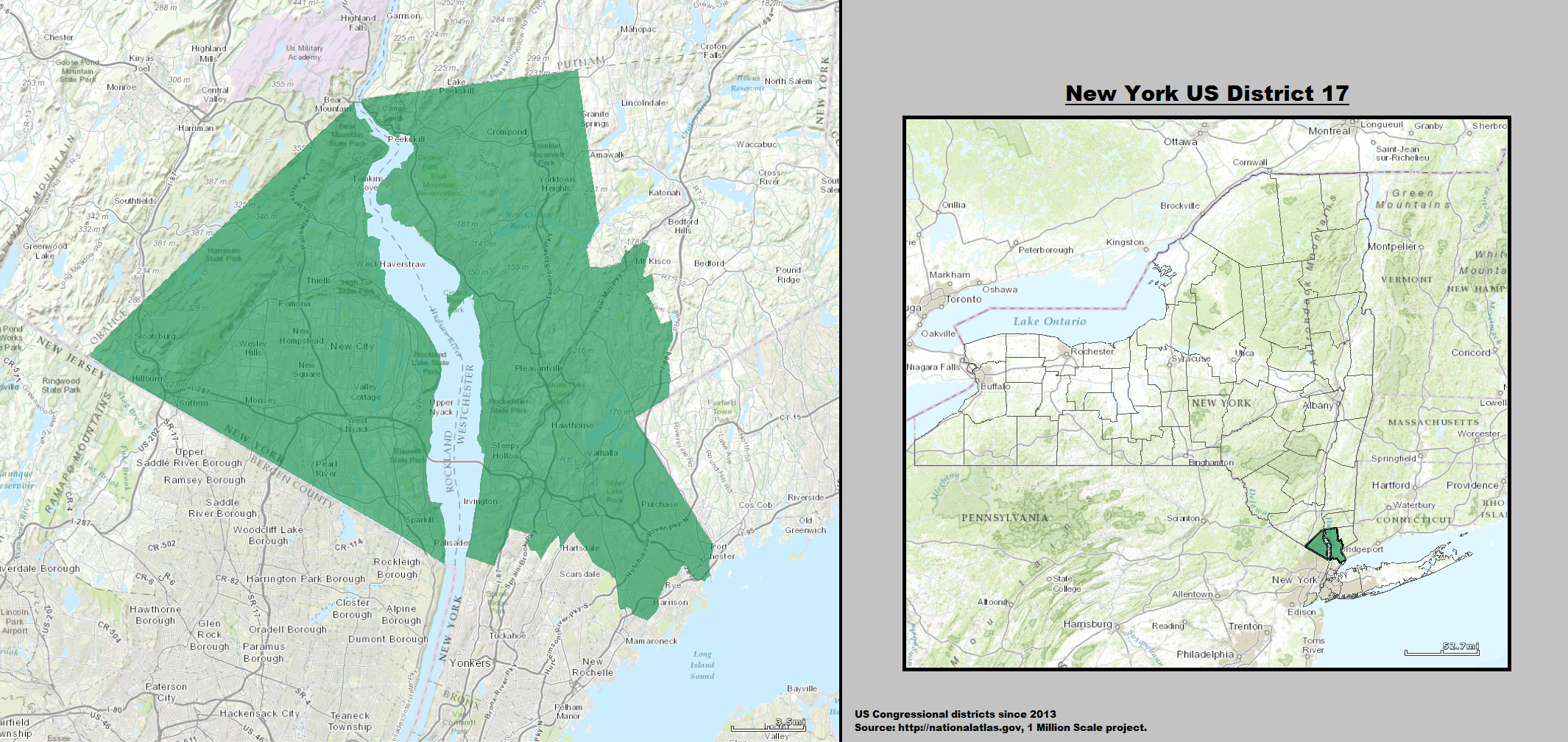
The district from 2013 to 2023

2023–present:

All of Putnam, Rockland
Parts of Dutchess, Westchester

2013–2023: map

All of Rockland
Part of Westchester

2003–2013:

Parts of Bronx, Rockland, Westchester.

1993–2003:

Parts of Bronx, Westchester.

1983–1993:

Parts of Bronx, Manhattan.

1973–1983:

All of Staten Island.
Parts of Manhattan.

1913–1973:

Parts of Manhattan.

1843–1853:

Montgomery

Various New York districts have been numbered "17" over the years, including areas in New York City and various parts of upstate New York. From 2003-2013, the 17th district encompassed portions of the Bronx, Westchester County, and Rockland County. It included the neighborhoods of Norwood, Riverdale, Wakefield, Williamsbridge, and Woodlawn in the Bronx; the city of Mount Vernon and parts of Yonkers in Westchester; and Monsey, Nanuet, Pearl River, Orangetown, Sparkill, Spring Valley, Haverstraw, and Suffern in Rockland County.

== Counties, towns, and cities ==
For the 119th and successive Congresses (based on the districts drawn following the New York Court of Appeals' December 2023 decision in Hoffman v New York State Ind. Redistricting. Commn.), the district contains all or portions of the following counties, towns, and municipalities.

Dutchess County (3)

Beekman (part; also 18th), East Fishkill, Pawling

Putnam County (6)

All six towns

Rockland County (5)

All five towns

Westchester County (14)

Bedford, Cortlandt, Greenburgh (part; also 16th; includes part of Tarrytown), Lewisboro, Mount Kisco, Mount Pleasant, New Castle, North Castle, North Salem, Ossining (town), Peekskill, Pound Ridge, Somers, Yorktown

== List of members representing the district ==
The District was historically the East Side Manhattan district (known as the "silk stocking district" for the wealth of its constituents). In the 1970s it was a Staten Island seat. It became the west side Manhattan seat in the 1980s. It became a Bronx-based seat in the 1992 remap and was shifted north into Rockland county in 2002 to absorb terrain from the deconstruction of the old 20th district.

Previously the 19th district covered much of the Bronx portion of the seat in the 1980s; while in the 1970s the 23rd district covered most of the Bronx area.

=== 1803–1833: one seat ===
Representative	Party	Years	Cong ress	Electoral history	Location
District established March 4, 1803
Oliver Phelps (Canandaigua)	Democratic-Republican	March 4, 1803 – March 3, 1805		Elected in 1802. [data missing]	1803–1809 [data missing]
Silas Halsey (Ovid)	Democratic-Republican	March 4, 1805 – March 3, 1807		Elected in 1804. Lost re-election.	1803–1809 [data missing]
John Harris (Aurelius)	Democratic-Republican	March 4, 1807 – March 3, 1809		Elected in 1806. Lost re-election.	1803–1809 [data missing]
District inactive		March 4, 1809 – March 3, 1813	11th 12th		
William S. Smith (Lebanon)	Federalist	March 4, 1813 – March 3, 1815		Elected in 1812. Re-elected in 1814 but did not take or claim the seat.	1813–1823; Herkimer County, except the Town of Danube; and Madison County.
Vacant		March 4, 1815 – December 13, 1815			1813–1823; Herkimer County, except the Town of Danube; and Madison County.
Westel Willoughby Jr. (Herkimer)	Democratic-Republican	December 13, 1815 – March 3, 1817		Successfully contested Smith's election. [data missing]	1813–1823; Herkimer County, except the Town of Danube; and Madison County.
Thomas H. Hubbard (Hamilton)	Democratic-Republican	March 4, 1817 – March 3, 1819		Elected in 1816. [data missing]	1813–1823; Herkimer County, except the Town of Danube; and Madison County.
Aaron Hackley Jr. (Herkimer)	Democratic-Republican	March 4, 1819 – March 3, 1821		Elected in 1818. [data missing]	1813–1823; Herkimer County, except the Town of Danube; and Madison County.
Vacant		March 4, 1821 – December 3, 1821		Elections were held in April 1821. It is unclear when results were announced or credentials issued.	1813–1823; Herkimer County, except the Town of Danube; and Madison County.
Thomas H. Hubbard (Hamilton)	Democratic-Republican	December 3, 1821 – March 3, 1823		Elected in 1821. [data missing]	1813–1823; Herkimer County, except the Town of Danube; and Madison County.
John W. Taylor (Ballston Spa)	Democratic-Republican	March 4, 1823 – March 3, 1825	18th 19th 20th 21st 22nd	Redistricted from 11th district and re-elected in 1822. Re-elected in 1824. Re-elected in 1826. Re-elected in 1828. Re-elected in 1830. Lost re-election.	Saratoga County
John W. Taylor (Ballston Spa)	Anti-Jacksonian	March 4, 1825 – March 3, 1833	18th 19th 20th 21st 22nd	Redistricted from 11th district and re-elected in 1822. Re-elected in 1824. Re-elected in 1826. Re-elected in 1828. Re-elected in 1830. Lost re-election.	Saratoga County

=== 1833–1843: two seats ===
From 1833 to 1843, two seats were apportioned to the 17th district, elected at-large on a general ticket.

==== Seat A ====
Representative	Party	Years	Cong ress	Electoral history
Samuel Beardsley (Utica)	Jacksonian	March 4, 1833 – March 29, 1836	23rd 24th	Redistricted from 14th district and re-elected in 1832. Re-elected in 1834. Resigned to become circuit judge.
Vacant		March 29, 1836 – November 9, 1836		[data missing]
Rutger B. Miller (Utica)	Jacksonian	November 9, 1836 – March 3, 1837		Elected to finish Beardsley's term. [data missing]
Henry A. Foster (Rome)	Democratic	March 4, 1837 – March 3, 1839		Elected in 1836. [data missing]
David P. Brewster (Oswego)	Democratic	March 4, 1839 – March 3, 1843	26th 27th	Elected in 1838. Re-elected in 1840. [data missing]

==== Seat B ====
Representative	Party	Years	Cong ress	Electoral history
Joel Turrill (Oswego)	Jacksonian	March 4, 1833 – March 3, 1837	23rd 24th	Elected in 1832. Re-elected in 1834. [data missing]
Abraham P. Grant (Oswego)	Democratic	March 4, 1837 – March 3, 1839		Elected in 1836. [data missing]
John G. Floyd (Utica)	Democratic	March 4, 1839 – March 3, 1843	26th 27th	Elected in 1838. Re-elected in 1840. [data missing]

=== 1843–present: one seat ===
Representative	Party	Years	Cong ress	Electoral history	District location
Charles S. Benton (Mohawk)	Democratic	March 4, 1843 – March 3, 1847	28th 29th	Elected in 1842. Re-elected in 1844. [data missing]	
George Petrie (Little Falls)	Independent Democrat	March 4, 1847 – March 3, 1849		Elected in 1846. [data missing]	
Henry P. Alexander (Little Falls)	Whig	March 4, 1849 – March 3, 1851		Elected in 1848. [data missing]	
Alexander H. Buell (Fairfield)	Democratic	March 4, 1851 – January 29, 1853		Elected in 1850. Died.	
Vacant		January 29, 1853 – March 3, 1853		[data missing]	
Bishop Perkins (Ogdensburg)	Democratic	March 4, 1853 – March 3, 1855		Elected in 1852. [data missing]	
Francis E. Spinner (Mohawk)	Democratic	March 4, 1855 – March 3, 1857	34th 35th 36th	Elected in 1854. Re-elected in 1856. Re-elected in 1858. [data missing]	
Francis E. Spinner (Mohawk)	Republican	March 4, 1857 – March 3, 1861	34th 35th 36th	Elected in 1854. Re-elected in 1856. Re-elected in 1858. [data missing]	
Socrates N. Sherman (Ogdensburg)	Republican	March 4, 1861 – March 3, 1863		Elected in 1860. [data missing]	
Calvin T. Hulburd (Brasher Falls)	Republican	March 4, 1863 – March 3, 1869	38th 39th 40th	Elected in 1862. Re-elected in 1864. Re-elected in 1866. [data missing]	
William A. Wheeler (Malone)	Republican	March 4, 1869 – March 3, 1873	41st 42nd	Elected in 1868. Re-elected in 1870. Redistricted to 18th district.	
Robert S. Hale (Elizabethtown)	Republican	March 4, 1873 – March 3, 1875		Elected in 1872. [data missing]	
Martin I. Townsend (Troy)	Republican	March 4, 1875 – March 3, 1879	44th 45th	Elected in 1874. Re-elected in 1876. [data missing]	
Walter A. Wood (Hoosick Falls)	Republican	March 4, 1879 – March 3, 1883	46th 47th	Elected in 1878. Re-elected in 1880. [data missing]	
Henry G. Burleigh (Whitehall)	Republican	March 4, 1883 – March 3, 1885		Elected in 1882. Redistricted to 18th district	
James G. Lindsley (Rondout)	Republican	March 4, 1885 – March 3, 1887		Elected in 1884. [data missing]	
Stephen T. Hopkins (Catskill)	Republican	March 4, 1887 – March 3, 1889		Elected in 1886. [data missing]	
Charles J. Knapp (Deposit)	Republican	March 4, 1889 – March 3, 1891		Elected in 1888. [data missing]	
Isaac N. Cox (Ellenville)	Democratic	March 4, 1891 – March 3, 1893		Elected in 1890. [data missing]	
Francis Marvin (Port Jervis)	Republican	March 4, 1893 – March 3, 1895		Elected in 1892. [data missing]	
Benjamin B. Odell Jr. (Newburgh)	Republican	March 4, 1895 – March 3, 1899	54th 55th	Elected in 1894. Re-elected in 1896. [data missing]	
Arthur S. Tompkins (Nyack)	Republican	March 4, 1899 – March 3, 1903	56th 57th	Elected in 1898. Re-elected in 1900. [data missing]	
Francis E. Shober (New York)	Democratic	March 4, 1903 – March 3, 1905		Elected in 1902. [data missing]	
William S. Bennet (New York)	Republican	March 4, 1905 – March 3, 1911	59th 60th 61st	Elected in 1904. Re-elected in 1906. Re-elected in 1908. [data missing]	
Henry George Jr. (New York)	Democratic	March 4, 1911 – March 3, 1913		Elected in 1910. Redistricted to 21st district	
John F. Carew (New York)	Democratic	March 4, 1913 – March 3, 1919	63rd 64th 65th	Elected in 1912. Re-elected in 1914. Re-elected in 1916; Redistricted to 18th district	
Herbert Pell (New York)	Democratic	March 4, 1919 – March 3, 1921		Elected in 1918. [data missing]	
Ogden L. Mills (New York)	Republican	March 4, 1921 – March 3, 1927	67th 68th 69th	Elected in 1920. Re-elected in 1922. Re-elected in 1924. [data missing]	
William W. Cohen (New York)	Democratic	March 4, 1927 – March 3, 1929		Elected in 1926. [data missing]	
Ruth B. Pratt (New York)	Republican	March 4, 1929 – March 3, 1933	71st 72nd	Elected in 1928. Re-elected in 1930. [data missing]	
Theodore A. Peyser (New York)	Democratic	March 4, 1933 – August 8, 1937	73rd 74th 75th	Elected in 1932. Re-elected in 1934. Re-elected in 1936. Died.	
Vacant		August 8, 1937 – November 2, 1937		[data missing]	
Bruce F. Barton (New York)	Republican	November 2, 1937 – January 3, 1941	75th 76th	Elected to finish Peyser's term. Re-elected in 1938. [data missing]	
Kenneth F. Simpson (New York)	Republican	January 3, 1941 – January 25, 1941		Elected in 1940. Died.	
Vacant		January 29, 1941 – March 11, 1941		[data missing]	
Joseph C. Baldwin (New York)	Republican	March 11, 1941 – January 3, 1947	77th 78th 79th	Elected to finish Simpson's term. Re-elected in 1942. Re-elected in 1944. [data missing]	
Frederic R. Coudert Jr. (New York)	Republican	January 3, 1947 – January 3, 1959	80th 81st 82nd 83rd 84th 85th	Elected in 1946. Re-elected in 1948. Re-elected in 1950. Re-elected in 1952. Re-elected in 1954. Re-elected in 1956. [data missing]	
John V. Lindsay (New York)	Republican	January 3, 1959 – December 31, 1965	86th 87th 88th 89th	Elected in 1958. Re-elected in 1960. Re-elected in 1962. Re-elected in 1964. Resigned after being elected as Mayor of New York City.	
Vacant		January 1, 1966 – February 7, 1966		[data missing]	
Theodore R. Kupferman (New York)	Republican	February 8, 1966 – January 3, 1969	89th 90th	Elected to finish Lindsay's term. Re-elected in 1966. [data missing]	
Ed Koch (New York)	Democratic	January 3, 1969 – January 3, 1973	91st 92nd	Elected in 1968. Re-elected in 1970. Redistricted to 18th district	
John M. Murphy (Staten Island)	Democratic	January 3, 1973 – January 3, 1981	93rd 94th 95th 96th	Redistricted from 16th district and re-elected in 1972. Re-elected in 1974. Re-elected in 1976. Re-elected in 1978. [data missing]	
Guy Molinari (Staten Island)	Republican	January 3, 1981 – January 3, 1983		Elected in 1980. Redistricted to 14th district	
Ted Weiss (New York)	Democratic	January 3, 1983 – September 14, 1992	98th 99th 100th 101st 102nd	Redistricted from 20th district and re-elected in 1982. Re-elected in 1984. Re-elected in 1986. Re-elected in 1988. Re-elected in 1990. Died.	
Vacant		September 15, 1992 – November 2, 1992		[data missing]	
Jerry Nadler (New York)	Democratic	November 3, 1992 – January 3, 1993		Elected to finish Weiss's term. Redistricted to the 8th district.	
Eliot Engel (The Bronx)	Democratic	January 3, 1993 – January 3, 2013	103rd 104th 105th 106th 107th 108th 109th 110th 111th 112th	Redistricted from the 19th district and re-elected in 1992. Re-elected in 1994. Re-elected in 1996. Re-elected in 1998. Re-elected in 2000. Re-elected in 2002. Re-elected in 2004. Re-elected in 2006. Re-elected in 2008. Re-elected in 2010. Redistricted to the 16th district.	
Eliot Engel (The Bronx)	Democratic	January 3, 1993 – January 3, 2013	103rd 104th 105th 106th 107th 108th 109th 110th 111th 112th	Redistricted from the 19th district and re-elected in 1992. Re-elected in 1994. Re-elected in 1996. Re-elected in 1998. Re-elected in 2000. Re-elected in 2002. Re-elected in 2004. Re-elected in 2006. Re-elected in 2008. Re-elected in 2010. Redistricted to the 16th district.	2003–2013; Parts of the Bronx, Rockland, Westchester counties
Nita Lowey (Harrison)	Democratic	January 3, 2013 – January 3, 2021	113th 114th 115th 116th	Redistricted from the 18th district and re-elected in 2012. Re-elected in 2014. Re-elected in 2016. Re-elected in 2018. Retired.	2013–2023; Rockland, parts of Westchester County
Mondaire Jones (Nyack)	Democratic	January 3, 2021 – January 3, 2023		Elected in 2020. Ran in the 10th district and lost renomination.	2013–2023; Rockland, parts of Westchester County
Mike Lawler (Pearl River)	Republican	January 3, 2023 – present	118th 119th	Elected in 2022. Re-elected in 2024. Lost re-election.	2023–2025; Rockland, parts of Dutchess, Putnam, Westchester counties
Mike Lawler (Pearl River)	Republican	January 3, 2023 – present	118th 119th	Elected in 2022. Re-elected in 2024. Lost re-election.	2025–present Rockland, parts of Dutchess, Putnam, Westchester counties
Cait Conley (New Castle)	Democratic	Assuming office on January 3, 2027	120th	Elected in 2026.	2025–present Rockland, parts of Dutchess, Putnam, Westchester counties

== Election results ==
Note that in New York State electoral politics there are numerous minor parties at various points on the political spectrum. Certain parties will invariably endorse either the Republican or Democratic candidate for every office, hence the state electoral results contain both the party votes, and the final candidate votes (Listed as "Recap").

New York's 17th congressional district, General Election 2024
Party	Candidate	Votes	%
Republican	Mike Lawler	180,924	47.7%
Conservative	Mike Lawler	16,921	4.5%
Total	Mike Lawler (incumbent)	197,845	52.2%
Democratic	Mondaire Jones	173,899	45.9%
Working Families	Anthony Frascone	7,530	2.0%
Total votes		379,274	100.0%
Republican hold			

New York's 17th congressional district, 2022
Party	Candidate	Votes	%
Republican	Mike Lawler	125,738	44.05%
Conservative	Mike Lawler	17,812	6.24%
Total	Mike Lawler	143,550	50.29%
Democratic	Sean Patrick Maloney	133,457	46.76%
Working Families	Sean Patrick Maloney	8,273	2.90%
Total	Sean Patrick Maloney (Incumbent)	141,730	49.65%
Write-in		150	0.05%
Total votes		285,430	100%

US House election, 2020: New York District 17
Party	Candidate	Votes	%
Democratic	Mondaire Jones	183,975	55.3
Working Families	Mondaire Jones	13,378	4.0
Total	Mondaire Jones	197,353	59.3
Republican	Maureen McArdle Schulman	117,307	35.3
Conservative	Yehudis Gottesfeld	8,887	2.7
Independent	Joshua Eisen	6,363	1.9
SAM	Michael Parietti	2,745	0.8
Total votes		332,655	100.0
Democratic hold			

US House election, 2018: New York District 17
Party	Candidate	Votes	%	±%
Democratic	Nita Lowey (incumbent)	170,168	88	−20.6
Reform	Joseph Ciardullo	23,150	12	
Turnout		193,318	100	−9.8

US House election, 2016: New York District 17
Party	Candidate	Votes	%	±%
Democratic	Nita Lowey (incumbent)	214,530	100	+118.5
Turnout		214,530	100	+18.1

US House election, 2014: New York District 17
Party	Candidate	Votes	%	±%
Democratic	Nita Lowey (incumbent)	98,150	54	−42.7
Republican	Chris Day	75,781	41.7	−17.5
N/A	Blank/Void/Scattering	7,743	4.3	
Turnout		181,674	100	−38.9

US House election, 2012: New York District 17
Party	Candidate	Votes	%	±%
Democratic	Nita Lowey	171,417	57.6	+79.7
Republican	Joe Carvin	91,899	30.9	+208.4
N/A	Blank/Void/Scattering	31,292	10.5	
Independent	Francis Morganthaler	2,771	0.9	
Turnout		297,379	100	+113.7

US House election, 2010: New York District 17
Party	Candidate	Votes	%	±%
Democratic	Eliot L. Engel (incumbent)	95,346	68.5	−36.2
Republican	Anthony Mele	29,792	21.4	−17.2
N/A	Blank/Void/Scattering	8,327	6	
Conservative	York J. Kleinhandler	5,661	4.1	
Turnout		139,126	100	−38.7

US House election, 2008: New York District 17
Party	Candidate	Votes	%	±%
Democratic	Eliot L. Engel (incumbent)	149,676	65.9	+59.8
Republican	Robert Goodman	35,994	15.8	+24.7
N/A	Blank/Void/Scattering	41,464	18.3	
Turnout		227,134	100	+85.4

US House election, 2006: New York District 17
Party	Candidate	Votes	%	±%
Democratic	Eliot L. Engel (incumbent)	93,614	76.4	+0.2
Republican	Jim Faulkner	28,842	23.6	+1.6
Majority		64,772	52.9	−1.3
Turnout		122,456	100	−33.6

US House election, 2004: New York District 17
Party	Candidate	Votes	%	±%
Democratic	Eliot L. Engel (incumbent)	140,530	76.2	+13.6
Republican	Matt I. Brennan	40,524	22.0	−12.4
Conservative	Kevin Brawley	3,482	1.9	+1.9
Majority		100,006	54.2	+26.0
Turnout		184,536	100	+49.0

US House election, 2002: New York District 17
Party	Candidate	Votes	%	±%
Democratic	Eliot L. Engel (incumbent)	77,535	62.6	−27.1
Republican	C. Scott Vanderhoef	42,634	34.4	+24.1
Right to Life	Arthur L. Gallagher	1,931	1.6	+1.6
Green	Elizabeth Shanklin	1,743	1.4	+1.4
Majority		34,901	28.2	−51.2
Turnout		123,843	100	−3.5

US House election, 2000: New York District 17
Party	Candidate	Votes	%	±%
Democratic	Eliot L. Engel (incumbent)	115,093	89.7	+1.7
Republican	Patrick McManus	13,201	10.3	−1.7
Majority		101,892	79.4	+3.4
Turnout		128,294	100	+39.5

US House election, 1998: New York District 17
Party	Candidate	Votes	%	±%
Democratic	Eliot L. Engel (incumbent)	80,947	88.0	+3.0
Republican	Peter Fiumefreddo	11,037	12.0	−1.3
Majority		69,910	76.0	+4.4
Turnout		91,984	100	−22.8

US House election, 1996: New York District 17
Party	Candidate	Votes	%	±%
Democratic	Eliot L. Engel (incumbent)	101,287	85.0	
Republican	Denis McCarthy	15,892	13.3	
Independence	Dennis Coleman	2,008	1.7	
Majority		85,395	71.6	
Turnout		119,187	100	

== See also ==
- List of United States congressional districts
- New York's congressional delegations
- New York's congressional districts
