= James Girard Lindsley =

American politician

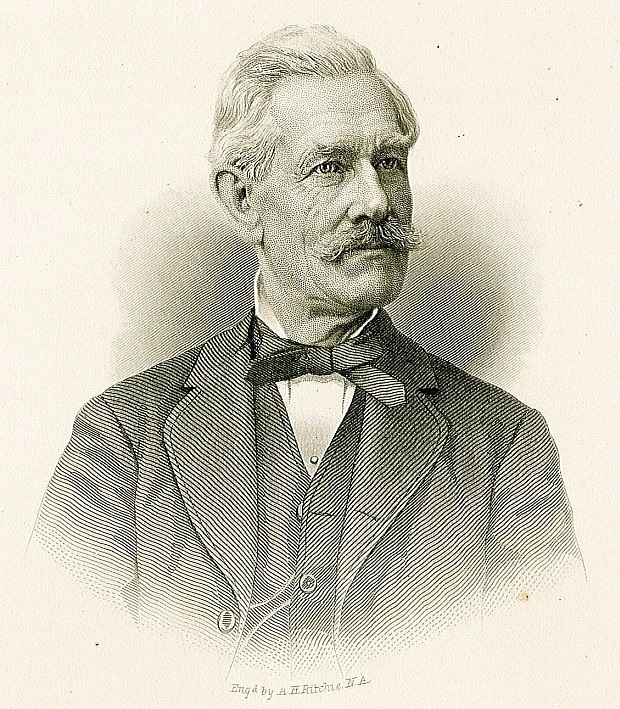

Member of the U.S. House of Representatives from New York's 17th district
- In office March 4, 1885 – March 3, 1887
- Preceded by: Henry G. Burleigh
- Succeeded by: Stephen T. Hopkins

Personal details
- Born: March 19, 1819 Orange, New Jersey, U.S.
- Died: December 4, 1898 (aged 79) Kingston, New York, U.S.
- Resting place: Montrepose Cemetery in Kingston, New York
- Citizenship: US
- Party: Republican
- Spouse(s): Sarah Esther Tompkins Lindsley; Laura B. Oatley Lindsley
- Children: Anna Lindsley McAllister
- Profession: Lawyer; Politician

James Girard Lindsley (March 19, 1819 – December 4, 1898) was an American politician and a U.S. representative from New York.

== Early life ==
Born in Orange, New Jersey, Lindsley attended the public schools, the military academy in Orange operated by Truman B. Ransom, and Pierson's Orange Classical School.

== Career ==
Lindsley moved to New York and was a trustee of the village of Rondout, New York from 1859 to 1864. He also served as president of the village of Rondout in 1852 and 1867–1869.

An ardent Whig, Republican, and Liberal, Lindsley was elected supervisor of Kingston, New York, in March 1872 and in April of the same year was elected the first mayor of Kingston, to which office he was reelected for six consecutive years. He was general manager of the Newark Lime & Cement Manufacturing Co., Kingston, New York, and was the organizer and president of the Kingston Water Co.

Elected as a Republican to the Forty-ninth Congress, Lindsley served as United States Representative for the first district of New York (March 4, 1885 – March 3, 1887). He was not a candidate for reelection in 1886.

== Death ==
Lindsley died in Kingston, New York, on December 4, 1898 (age 79 years, 260 days). He is interred at Montrepose Cemetery in Kingston, New York.

== Personal life ==
The son of John Morris and Charlotte Taylor Lindsley, he married Sarah Esther Tompkins on September 25, 1844, and they had one daughter, Anna Lindsley McAllister. Sarah died on June 29, 1876, and Lindsley married Laura B. Oatley on July 3, 1877.

== See also ==
- List of mayors of Kingston, New York

U.S. House of Representatives
Preceded by Henry G. Burleigh	Member of the U.S. House of Representatives from New York's 17th congressional district 1885–1887	Succeeded by Stephen T. Hopkins
