= George Petrie (politician) =

American politician

- Born: September 8, 1793; Little Falls, New York
- Died: May 8, 1879 (aged 85); Little Falls, New York
- Occupations: Merchant, politician
- Known for: Member of the United States House of Representatives
- Predecessor: Charles S. Benton
- Successor: Henry P. Alexander
- Political party: Independent Democrat

George Petrie (September 8, 1793 – May 8, 1879) was a U.S. representative from New York.

Born at Little Falls, New York, Petrie attended the common schools, worked as a store clerk, and became a merchant, operating a store in partnership with his brother Richard.

He was active in the militia, serving as quartermaster of his regiment during the War of 1812. He later attained the rank of major general as commander of the New York Militia's 1st Division of Riflemen. He also served in local offices, including justice of the peace.

Petrie was elected as an Independent Democrat to the Thirtieth Congress (March 4, 1847 – March 3, 1849)

He was employed as a clerk in the Post Office Department in Washington, D.C., from January 1, 1869, until August 31, 1875, when he resigned.

He died at Little Falls, New York, on May 8, 1879. He was interred in Church Street Cemetery.

U.S. House of Representatives
Preceded by Charles S. Benton	Member of the U.S. House of Representatives from New York's 17th congressional district 1847–1849	Succeeded by Henry P. Alexander
