= Thomas H. Hubbard =

American politician (1781–1857)

Thomas Hill Hubbard
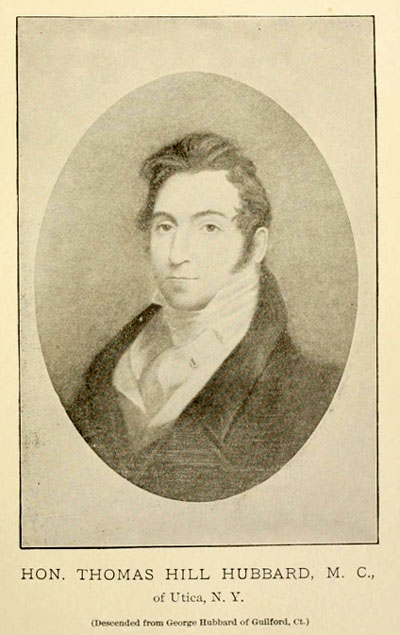

Member of the U.S. House of Representatives from New York's 17th district
- In office March 4, 1817 – March 4, 1819
- Preceded by: Westel Willoughby Jr.
- Succeeded by: Aaron Hackley Jr.
- In office March 4, 1821 – March 4, 1823
- Preceded by: Aaron Hackley Jr.
- Succeeded by: John W. Taylor

Personal details
- Born: December 5, 1781 New Haven, Connecticut, U.S.
- Died: May 21, 1857 (aged 75) Utica, New York, U.S.
- Resting place: Forest Hill Cemetery; Utica, New York, U.S.
- Party: Democratic-Republican
- Spouse: Phebe Hubbard
- Children: Henry, Bela, Frances, Frederick, Grace, Mary Ann, Thomas, Mary Smith, Edward, Caroline, Robert
- Education: Yale College
- Profession: Politician; lawyer; court clerk; trustee

Thomas Hill Hubbard (December 5, 1781 – May 21, 1857) was an American lawyer, judge and public official from Madison County, New York. A member of the Democratic-Republican party, Hubbard was twice elected as U.S. Representative from New York and was a three-time Presidential elector.

== Career ==
Born in New Haven, Connecticut, Hubbard pursued a classical education, graduating from Yale College in 1799. In New York he studied law under John Woodworth, was admitted to the bar in 1804, and commenced practice in Hamilton, New York.

Hubbard was Surrogate of Madison County, New York, from 1806 to 1816. In 1812, he was a presidential elector voting for the DeWitt Clinton ticket.

Hubbard was elected as a Democratic-Republican to the 15th United States Congress, serving from 1817 to 1819. He was Chairman of the Committee on Expenditures in the Post Office Department. During his congressional term, he held concurrently the post of District Attorney of the Sixth District (1816–18) and of Madison County (1818–21).

Hubbard was again elected to the 17th United States Congress, serving from 1821 to 1823. Afterward, he moved to Utica, the seat of Oneida County, New York. He formed a partnership with Greene C. Bronson and was later appointed Clerk of the New York Supreme Court, a position he held from 1825 to 1835.

He was one of the founders of Hamilton College and Hamilton Academy in Clinton, New York, was a trustee of Utica Free Academy and was the first president of the board of directors of the New York State Lunatic Asylum at Utica, which opened in 1843.

In 1844 and 1852, he was again a presidential elector, both times on the Democratic ticket, voting for James Knox Polk and Franklin Pierce.

== Family ==
Thomas Hubbard died in Utica at the age of 75 and was interred in Forest Hill Cemetery in Utica. The Hubbard family was prominent in investing and developing of the Hudson River, Michigan Southern and Northern Indiana Railroad lines from the mid-1840s through the late 1860s and, in subsequent decades, Hubbard's son, Frederick, served as Superintendent of Construction on various sections of the New York and Erie Railroad bridges, becoming assistant engineer of the Michigan Southern and Michigan Central Railroad. Hubbard's son Bela moved to Detroit, Michigan and became a noted Michigan geologist, naturalist, explorer, writer and civic leader.

== Ancestry ==
Ancestors of Thomas H. Hubbard

32. George Hubbard
16. Daniel Hubbard
33. Mary Bishop
8. Daniel Hubbard
17. Elizabeth Jordon
4. Daniel Hubbard
9. Elizabeth Cruttenden
2. Bela Hubbard
10. Andrew Ward
5. Diana Ward
11. Deborah Joy
1. Thomas Hill Hubbard
12. Capt. Thomas Hill
6. Thaddeus Hill
13. Mary Burr
3. Grace Dunbar Hill
7. Elizabeth Isaacs

U.S. House of Representatives
| Preceded by Westel Willoughby Jr. | Member of the U.S. House of Representatives from New York's 17th congressional district 1817 - 1819 | Succeeded by Aaron Hackley Jr. |
| Preceded by Aaron Hackley Jr. | Member of the U.S. House of Representatives from New York's 17th congressional district 1821 - 1823 | Succeeded by John W. Taylor |
