= Dutch Schirick =

American baseball player (1890-1968)

- Pinch hitter
- Born: June 15, 1890; Ruby, New York, U.S.
- Died: November 12, 1968 (aged 78); Kingston, New York, U.S.
- Batted: Right Threw: Right

MLB debut
- September 17, 1914, for the St. Louis Browns

Last MLB appearance
- September 17, 1914, for the St. Louis Browns

MLB statistics
- Games played: 1
- At bats: 0
- Stolen bases: 2
- Stats at Baseball Reference

Teams
- St. Louis Browns (1914)

Harry Ernest "Dutch" Schirick (June 15, 1890 – November 12, 1968) was an American pinch hitter in Major League Baseball for one game in 1914, who also later had a career as a New York Supreme Court judge for the Third District from 1935 to 1961.

== Life ==
Schirick was born June 15, 1890, in Ruby, New York. He studied law at Cornell, where he was a member of the Quill and Dagger Society. He played the position of catcher and was captain of the baseball team. Hughie Jennings managed the Cornell baseball team and recommended Schirick to Branch Rickey, who signed him for the St. Louis Browns.

Schirick made one plate appearance, for the St. Louis Browns on September 17, 1914, as a pinch hitter. With the hometown Browns down 12-2 in the bottom of the ninth to the Washington Senators, Schirick walked for pitcher Allan Sothoron, who coincidentally was also making his major league debut in the game.

This made Schirick (whose records do not show him playing for any other pro team, even in the minors) one of only five MLB players with one distinction: he drew a walk in his only plate appearance and did not play in the field. (The most famous of these five: Eddie Gaedel.) Schirick is also credited with stealing two bases, presumably second and third, since he is not credited with scoring a run; this makes him the only player in MLB history to play in only one game with two steals. However, with the Senators up by 10 runs in the ninth, under modern scoring practices, Schirick likely would have been credited with advancing to these bases via defensive indifference.

After one season, and one time at bat, Schirick declined an offer to go the minors, and decided to pursue a career in law. In 1921, he organized a semi-professional team, the Colonials, in Kingston, New York, and managed and played for the team in its early days. The Colonials were a dominant force in Hudson Valley semi-pro baseball until their demise in 1927, and played nine exhibition games against major league teams.

Schirick was also involved in local politics and was Chairman of the Ulster County Democratic Party in 1927. In 1932, he was a New York delegate to the Democratic National Convention in Chicago. Schirick served as a New York Supreme Court judge for the Third District from 1935 to 1961.

Judge Harry Schirick died in Kingston, November 12, 1968, and is buried in Mount Marion Cemetery, Mount Marion, New York.

== Sources ==
- Tiano, Charles J. “Tiano’s Topics”, Kingston Daily Freeman, 10 December 1968, p. 19.
