= Hasbrouck Park =

Hasbrouck Park is a 45 acres (18 ha) park in Kingston, New York or in Kingston (town), New York

Opened in 1920, it was Kingston's first "official" downtown park.

Much of the park's area was mined by the Newark Lime and Cement Company in the 1800s and early 1900s. That company's Stone Building, built in 1919 and renamed the Emilio Primo Stone Building in 1999, is used for events and recreation programs.

The Hasbrouck Park Trail through the park is .5 miles (0.80 km) long and provides information on nature and local history.

In 2019, a college student was killed by a 150 feet (46 m) fall, at night, in Hasbrouck Park, Kingston.
