= Aaron Hackley Jr. =

American politician (1783–1868)

Member of the U.S. House of Representatives from New York's 17th district
- Preceded by: Thomas H. Hubbard
- Succeeded by: Thomas H. Hubbard

Personal details
- Born: May 6, 1783 Wallingford, Connecticut, USA
- Died: December 28, 1868 (aged 85) New York City, New York, USA
- Resting place: Trinity Church Cemetery, New York City
- Party: Democratic-Republican

Member of the New York House of Representatives from the Herkimer district
- In office July 1, 1813 – July 1, 1815
- Preceded by: John Graves; Hosea Nelson; Rudolph I. Shoemaker
- Succeeded by: William D. Ford; Henry Hopkins; John McCombs
- In office July 1, 1817 – June 30, 1818
- Preceded by: William D. Ford; Henry Hopkins; John McCombs
- Succeeded by: Jonas Cleland; Nicoll Fosdick; Henry Gros

Aaron Hackley Jr. (May 6, 1783 – December 28, 1868) was a U.S. Representative from New York.

Born in Wallingford, Connecticut, Hackley attended the public schools, and graduated from Williams College in 1805. He moved to Herkimer, New York.

Hackley was elected county clerk in 1812 and again in 1815. He served as judge advocate in the War of 1812. He served as member of the New York State Assembly in 1814, 1815, and 1818.

Hackley was elected as a Democratic-Republican to the Sixteenth Congress (March 4, 1819 – March 3, 1821). He served as district attorney of Herkimer County 1828–1833. He was again a member of the New York State Assembly in 1837. He served as justice of the county court of St. Lawrence County, New York, in 1823 and 1824. He served as master in chancery, and as recorder of Utica, New York.

Hackley died in New York City on December 28, 1868. He was interred in Trinity Church Cemetery.

U.S. House of Representatives
Preceded by Thomas H. Hubbard	Member of the U.S. House of Representatives from New York's 17th congressional district 1819–1821	Succeeded by Thomas H. Hubbard
