= Charles J. Knapp =

American politician

Charles Junius Knapp
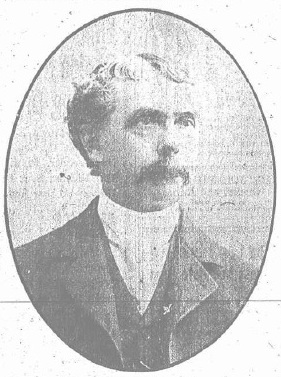
- Charles J. Knapp

Member of the U.S. House of Representatives from New York's 17th district
- In office March 4, 1889 – March 3, 1891
- Preceded by: Stephen T. Hopkins
- Succeeded by: Isaac N. Cox

Personal details
- Born: Charles Junius Knapp; June 30, 1845 Pepacton, New York
- Died: June 1, 1916 (aged 70) Binghamton, New York
- Resting place: Deposit, New York
- Education: Hamilton College, Clinton, New York
- Occupation: Politician and banker

Charles Junius Knapp (June 30, 1845—June 1, 1916) was a politician and banker from Deposit, New York. He served in the New York State Assembly and in the United States House of Representatives. He was indicted in the failure of the Binghamton Trust Company, the Knapp Bros. Bank, and the Outing Publishing Company.

== Life ==
Charles J. Knapp was born on June 30, 1845, in Pepacton, New York (the town is now submerged under the Pepacton reservoir) near the town of Deposit. His family moved to Deposit in 1848, where his family owned the Knapp Bank. Knapp's father, Charles Knapp, was a banker and a Republican politician (he served in both the New York State Assembly as well as in the United States House of Representatives). Knapp graduated from the Delaware Literary Institute (then the Franklin School) of Franklin, New York in 1863 and Hamilton College (Class of 1866) in Clinton, New York (where he was a member of the Delta Kappa Epsilon fraternity) and joined the family Knapp Bank. He married Charlotte Augusta Ford of Binghamton, NY on 16 February 1871 and had seven children with her. Knapp died on June 1, 1916, in Binghamton, New York and is buried at the Laurel Bank Cemetery in Deposit.

== Career ==
Knapp was a member of the New York State Assembly (Delaware Co.) in 1886 and 1888. He was elected as a Republican to the 51st United States Congress, holding office from March 4, 1889, to March 3, 1891. While in Congress, he was a member of the House Committee on Coinage, Weights, and Measures.

He was an alternate delegate to the 1900 Republican National Convention. He also served as the President of the Board of Education and the Board of Supervisors of Delaware County New York.

Knapp came from a banking family and he started his career as a banker with the family-run Knapp Bank of Deposit, New York. Later, he became the President of the Binghamton Trust Company of Binghamton, New York. He was also the President of the Outing Publishing Company of Deposit, New York.

=== The Binghamton Trust Company failure ===
On April 8, 1909, the Binghamton Trust Company suspended its operations and the private banks owned by the Knapp family in Deposit and Callicoon, New York failed without warning largely because of large loans made by the Knapp Banks (over $700,000 on a deposit base of $650,000) headed by Charles P. Knapp (nephew of Charles J. Knapp) to The Outing Publishing Company, of which Charles J. Knapp was the President, and loans made by the Binghamton Trust Company to the Knapp Banks. Investigations revealed that the Knapp Bank was being bailed out by the Binghamton Trust Company of which Charles J. Knapp was the President. As a result, the Binghamton Trust Company also failed. Both Knapps were charged with criminally transferring money to an institution that they knew to be insolvent. Charles P. Knapp was sentenced to up to two years for his role in the failure. Charles J. Knapp was indicted, and was acquitted in 1913. Most Knapp family members declared bankruptcy. The building that housed the Knapp Bank currently serves as the home of the Deposit Historical Museum.

New York State Assembly
Preceded by Silas S. Cartwright	New York State Assembly; Delaware County; 1886	Succeeded by David L. Thomson
Preceded by David L. Thomson	New York State Assembly; Delaware County; 1888	Succeeded by George O. Mead
U.S. House of Representatives
Preceded by Stephen T. Hopkins	Member of the U.S. House of Representatives from New York's 17th congressional district 1889–1891	Succeeded by Isaac N. Cox
