= Francis Marvin =

American politician (1828–1905)

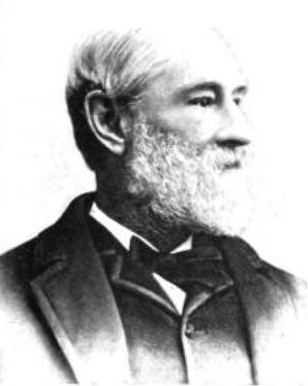

Member of the U.S. House of Representatives from New York's 17th district
- In office March 4, 1893 – March 3, 1895
- Preceded by: Isaac N. Cox
- Succeeded by: Benjamin Odell

Personal details
- Born: March 8, 1828 New York City, U.S.
- Died: August 14, 1905 (aged 77) Port Jervis, New York, U.S.
- Resting place: Laurel Grove Cemetery
- Party: Republican
- Profession: Politician

Francis Marvin (March 8, 1828 – August 14, 1905) was a U.S. representative from New York.

Born in New York City, Marvin attended the public schools in Port Jervis, Orange County. He entered upon a commercial career and engaged in the promotion, construction, and operation of railroads, water-supply companies, bridges, manufacture of illuminating gas, and in banking. He was postmaster of Port Jervis in 1851. He was in the Justice of the Peace in the town of Deerpark in 1852. He was employed as bookkeeper in a bank in 1856. He was an unsuccessful candidate of the Republican Party for member of the assembly in 1864 and for the State senate in 1881. He was president of the village of Port Jervis in 1865.

Marvin was elected as a Republican to the Fifty-third Congress (March 4, 1893 – March 3, 1895).

He declined to be a candidate for renomination in 1894 and devoted his time to the management of his several business enterprises.

He died in Port Jervis, New York, August 14, 1905. He was interred in Laurel Grove Cemetery.

== Electoral history ==
New York's 17th congressional district election, 1892
Party	Candidate	Votes	%
Republican	Francis Marvin	17,806	48.51
Democratic	Henry Bacon (incumbent)	17,659	48.11
Prohibition	Joseph M. Leeper	1,243	3.39
Total votes		36,708	100.00
Republican gain from Democratic			

== Sources ==
- United States Congress. "Francis Marvin (id: M000209)". Biographical Directory of the United States Congress.

U.S. House of Representatives
Preceded by Isaac N. Cox	Member of the U.S. House of Representatives from New York's 17th congressional district 1893 - 1895	Succeeded by Benjamin Odell
