= Lake Katrine, New York =

- CDP
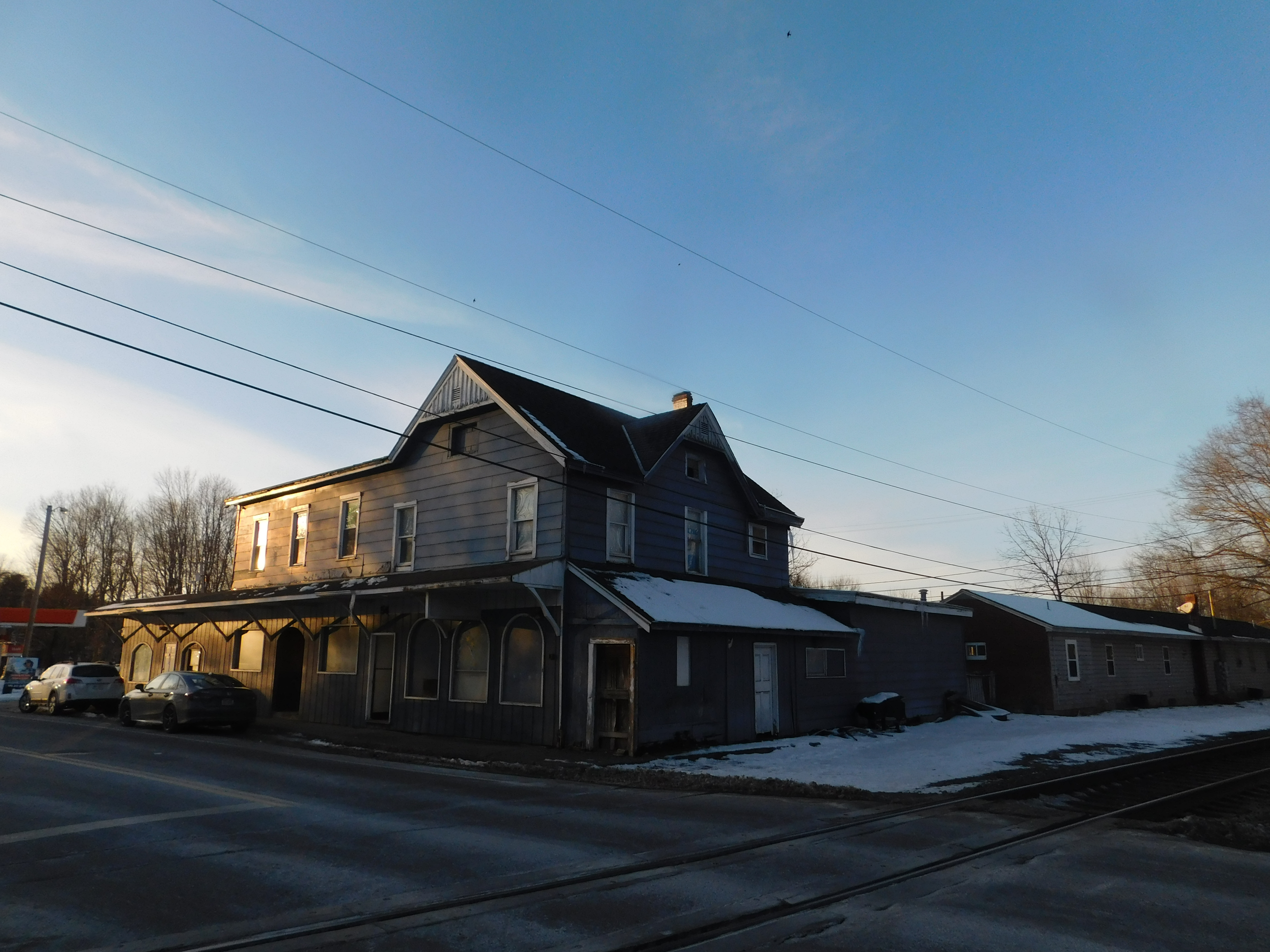
- The former West Shore Railroad station in Lake Katrine in January 2026.

- Location in Ulster County and the state of New York.
- Coordinates: 41°59′2″N 73°59′50″W
- Country: United States
- State: New York
- County: Ulster

Area
  - Total: 2.32 sq mi (6.00 km^{2})
  - Land: 2.28 sq mi (5.90 km^{2})
  - Water: 0.039 sq mi (0.10 km^{2})
- Elevation: 184 ft (56 m)

Population (2020)
  - Total: 2,522
  - Density: 1,107.1/sq mi (427.45/km^{2})
- Time zone: UTC-5 (EST)
  - Summer (DST): UTC-4 (EDT)
- ZIP code: 12449
- Area code: 845
- FIPS code: 36-40585
- GNIS feature ID: 0954922

Lake Katrine is a hamlet (and census-designated place (CDP)) in Ulster County, New York, United States. The population was 2,522 at the 2020 census.

Lake Katrine is a community in the western part of the Town of Ulster, located near a small lake, also called Lake Katrine. The hamlet is north of the City of Kingston.

== History ==
The community was once called "Pine Bush" and the lake was known as "Auntrens Pond."

== Geography ==
Lake Katrine is located at 41°59′02″N 73°59′50″W.

According to the United States Census Bureau, the CDP has a total area of 2.2 square miles (5.7 km^{2}), of which 2.2 square miles (5.7 km^{2}) is land and 0.04 square miles (0.10 km^{2}) (1.78%) is water.

The community is located next to Esopus Creek.

== Demographics ==
Historical population
Census	Pop.	Note	%±
2000	2,396		—
2010	2,397		0.0%
2020	2,522		5.2%
U.S. Decennial Census

=== 2020 census ===
As of the 2020 census, Lake Katrine had a population of 2,522. The median age was 49.3 years. 15.8% of residents were under the age of 18 and 25.1% of residents were 65 years of age or older. For every 100 females there were 100.3 males, and for every 100 females age 18 and over there were 96.7 males age 18 and over.

89.0% of residents lived in urban areas, while 11.0% lived in rural areas.

There were 909 households in Lake Katrine, of which 24.0% had children under the age of 18 living in them. Of all households, 40.4% were married-couple households, 20.6% were households with a male householder and no spouse or partner present, and 31.4% were households with a female householder and no spouse or partner present. About 35.6% of all households were made up of individuals and 19.7% had someone living alone who was 65 years of age or older.

There were 962 housing units, of which 5.5% were vacant. The homeowner vacancy rate was 0.8% and the rental vacancy rate was 1.0%.

Racial composition as of the 2020 census
Race	Number	Percent
White	1,960	77.7%
Black or African American	117	4.6%
American Indian and Alaska Native	14	0.6%
Asian	66	2.6%
Native Hawaiian and Other Pacific Islander	1	0.0%
Some other race	138	5.5%
Two or more races	226	9.0%
Hispanic or Latino (of any race)	324	12.8%

=== 2000 census ===
As of the census of 2000, there were 2,396 people, 821 households, and 487 families residing in the CDP. The population density was 1,084.1 inhabitants per square mile (418.6/km^{2}). There were 891 housing units at an average density of 403.1 per square mile (155.6/km^{2}). The racial makeup of the CDP was 91.44% White, 4.09% African American, 0.33% Native American, 1.96% Asian, 0.25% Pacific Islander, 0.25% from other races, and 1.67% from two or more races. Hispanic or Latino of any race were 2.21% of the population.

There were 821 households, out of which 27.5% had children under the age of 18 living with them, 44.1% were married couples living together, 11.0% had a female householder with no husband present, and 40.6% were non-families. 34.0% of all households were made up of individuals, and 12.4% had someone living alone who was 65 years of age or older. The average household size was 2.24 and the average family size was 2.88.

In the CDP, the population was spread out, with 17.9% under the age of 18, 5.6% from 18 to 24, 29.0% from 25 to 44, 23.5% from 45 to 64, and 24.1% who were 65 years of age or older. The median age was 44 years. For every 100 females, there were 81.7 males. For every 100 females age 18 and over, there were 81.2 males.

The median income for a household in the CDP was $38,017, and the median income for a family was $46,375. Males had a median income of $36,184 versus $28,214 for females. The per capita income for the CDP was $18,713. About 5.5% of families and 13.2% of the population were below the poverty line, including 5.6% of those under age 18 and 14.7% of those age 65 or over.

== Education ==
The school district for the CDP is Kingston City School District. The comprehensive high school of the Kingston City district is Kingston High School.
