= Kingston High School (New York) =

Location
- 403 Broadway; Kingston, NY 12401; United States; 41.926723°N 73.996589°W

Information
- Type: Comprehensive public high school
- Established: 1915
- School district: Kingston City School District
- Superintendent: Paul J. Padalino
- CEEB code: 332705
- Principal: Rachael Scorca
- Teaching staff: 147.11 (FTE)
- Grades: 9–12
- Enrollment: 1,749 (2024–2025)
- Student to teacher ratio: 11.89
- Campus type: Small city-urban
- Colors: Maroon and white
- Mascot: Tigers
- Newspaper: Highlights
- Feeder schools: J. Watson Bailey Middle School, M. Clifford Miller Middle School
- Website: khs.kingstoncityschools.org

Kingston High School is a comprehensive four-year school with an enrollment of approximately 2,500 students and staff located off of Broadway, Andrew Street, and West O'Reilly Street in Kingston, New York, United States. It is a part of the Kingston City School District.

The school district, of which this is the sole comprehensive high school, includes the City of Kingston and the following census-designated places: East Kingston, Hillside, Lake Katrine, Lincoln Park, Port Ewen, and Rifton. It also includes the majority of the Hurley, Ruby, Tillson, and Zena CDPs, and a portion of the Rosendale CDPs.

== Campus ==
The school comprises several buildings, connected on all levels or by pedestrian bridges. The Main building, which was the original high school building was built in the neoclassical style, and still features its original terrazzo marble flooring. The auditorium and theatrical stage are located there, along with various classrooms, and former administration offices. A music wing housing the band and choir rooms was built onto the back of the Main building. On one side of the Main building is the Kate Walton Field House, which contains the gym and pool. The Salzmann building is located behind the Main building, and now holds the school's primary entrance. It contains many of the faculty and administration offices, as well as the cafeteria, library, and numerous classrooms. The newest buildings, the East and West, are located on opposite sides of the Salzmann building. The Whiston building is on the other side of the Main building and is adjacent to the West building. It contains the art department. The Carnegie building contains the KHS TV studio and the former library. The Myron J. Michael, or MJM building held ninth grade students until it was torn down during 2017–18, when construction of the East and West building began, as well as the improvements of the Field House and Salzmann building. The school was founded in 1915, at its current location.

== Kingston High School Television ==
KHS-TV Channel 20 logo (January 2009–present)

KHS-TV is a student-run television studio within the school. Founded during the 1991–1992 school year as a partial replacement to loudspeaker announcements on the high school complex, the studio began producing KHS Morning Edition on November 23, 1992 to bring students in select rooms a daily ten-minute show packed with announcements, video coverage of happenings in the school, lunch and weather forecasts, sports, and more. With the start of season two on September 14, 1993, the morning show was retitled Wake Up, KHS! In 1999, the station spread throughout the campus via closed-circuit television, completing its replacement of loudspeaker announcements.

In October 2000, several KHS-TV students covered President Bill Clinton's trip to Kingston. Clinton said, "Wake Up, KHS!" as he toured Washington Avenue, behind George Washington School, and later did an impromptu interview with several students at the Kingston Airport. He also signed a poster with KHS-TV's original logo.

=== Programming ===
KHS-TV's Wake Up, KHS! is a ten-minute broadcast produced live at the start of second period for ten minutes. Primarily intended to inform the student body, the show highlights school events, sports, weather, and happenings from throughout the city while also occasionally including student-produced original comedy shorts in an effort to entertain viewers. With the creation of KHS-TV Channel 20, the show was first publicly viewable on January 6, 2009. It previously aired from 7:50 AM – 8 AM, then from 7:45 AM – 7:55 AM (2017–18).

The studio, which was originally housed in the Salzmann building and is now housed in the Carnegie Library Building, also periodically produced Kingston City Schools Chronicles, a show hosted by the current Kingston City Schools superintendent, discussing the internal workings of the school district and the latest news from various schools. Shows were approximately thirty minutes in length and were pre-recorded for airing at later times. Originally debuting on public-access television public access channel 23 in February 2005, the show moved to KHS-TV Channel 20 upon the creation of the new outlet.

When pre-packaged shows were not airing, various independently produced video clips and announcement slides were aired to fill the rest of the broadcast day. Typical broadcast blocks were noon, 4PM, 7PM, 9PM, and midnight, with the "Wake Up, KHS" broadcast live at 8:36 am on school days.

The show now airs on the Kingston City School District website.

=== Distribution ===
KHS-TV debuted on channel 17 via closed-circuit television within campus, later moving internally to channel 5. During its first sixteen years, the station could be viewed only within the school. As part of a deal with Time Warner Cable and the City of Kingston, KHS-TV began broadcasting programming throughout the district via Kingston Time Warner Cable channel 20 towards the end of December 2008. The station remains on channel 5 within the campus, showing slides during the day after Wake Up, KHS! instead of video.

KHS-TV has slowly branched out to have a limited presence on the Internet, beginning with K.B. Alantine Productions, a production group formed in January 2007, and comprising past members Kevin Brice, Alan Fortine, and Richard Valentine. The group originally formed in an effort to bring fresh new comedy to Wake Up, KHS! The three quickly started an ongoing series featuring characters Mr. Bananaman and Agent V in comedic situations, eventually dubbing the segment "WUKI4" (for "Wake Up, KHS in 4", after a countdown found at the end of some early videos). Since the 2006–2007 school year, the segment has expanded to include otherfeatures such as coverage of local events, with the segment's name changing by 0.1 each year. Though all members have since graduated, production has continued on a limited basis.

The organization has also expanded with its production of KHS-TV Summer, a summer program allowing for broadcast beyond the September–June school year. Created in the summer of 2009, the show combines comedic shorts with in-depth coverage of local events during the summer months.

== Music ==
Kingston High School maintains a music program involving approximately fifteen percent of the student body. The department features a string orchestra, chamber orchestra, mixed chorus, choir, symphonic band, concert band, wind ensemble, and nationally recognized jazz program, which, in 2009, was selected as a finalist at the Essentially Ellington Competition at Lincoln Center in New York City. In 2026, the jazz program was split into two bands including the Jazz Ensemble and Jazz Band to accommodate for size and skill disparities. The Jazz Ensemble maintains a higher level of repertoire while the jazz band is used to train incoming students.

In the fall of 2012, the Kingston High School Tiger Marching Band came in first place in the New York State Field Band Conference Championships, held on October 28 at the Carrier Dome in Syracuse, New York. The band scored an 85.60, its highest ranking at the time. The band came in second place in the two years prior with scores of 82.85 and 84.40. Their current highest score is 91.20, which was achieved at the New York State Field Band Conference Championship in Syracuse, NY in 2024 performing their field show "Legends of the North". The marching band program is the current largest in New York State.

The KHS Choir was founded by Leonard Stine in the 1930s and has performed at such venues as Carnegie Hall and the Fisher Center at Bard College. The Choir remains nationally recognized for their students frequent ability to be accepted into prestigious events like the All Eastern U.S. Choir, New York All State Choir, and other prestigious events. The choirs signature piece, The Lord Bless You and Keep You, has been sung for generations. While the schools official Alma Mater has been sung as a traditional school fight song since four years after the schools founding in 1918 by small student groups and faculty until its adoption by the choir in the 1930's.

Once a year, the Kingston High School Wind Ensemble, select members from other bands, and Choir come together to perform their masterworks event. Created by Lawrence Lohman, nicknamed loh by students and faculty, around 2005. Since his passing in 2026, the event has been renamed to the Lawrence Lohman Masterwork Series. This event features one "masterwork" such as Verdi's Requiem, O' Fortuna, and other timeless pieces. At this event the Choir and Band also perform select spring repertoire alone.

Kingston High School Frequently hosts the NYSSMA solo festival event for all Zone 9 schools. Kingston High School also frequently hosts the NYSSMA majors event, a collection of many music programs that compete for 4 levels of grade; bronze, silver, gold, and gold with distinction.

== Sports ==
Kingston competes in Section IX of the New York State Public High School Athletic Association (NYSPHSAA).

Kingston High School's Tiger sports program has many different school-funded activities. The school sponsors football, swimming and diving, tennis, indoor and outdoor track and field, cross-country, cheerleading, Nordic skiing, golf, lacrosse, field hockey, soccer, basketball, baseball, softball, volleyball, wrestling, and crew. Other sports operate semi-independently as clubs within the school, without varsity program funding.

In 2012, the Kingston High School Varsity Boys Baseball Team clinched their first New York State Class AA Championship.

== Notable alumni ==
- Robert Dietz, WW2 Soldier Dietz Stadium named in his honor.
- Jerry Drake, football player
- Pat Ryan (politician)
- Paul Runge, baseball player
- Billy Costello, world boxing champion
- Mike Ferraro, baseball player
- Justin Robinson, Monmouth University basketball player
- Zack Short, baseball player
- Brian Moore Jr., basketball player
- Keith Simmons, basketball player
- Joe Ausanio, baseball player
