= Lock Tender's House and Canal Store Ruin =

- U.S. National Register of Historic Places
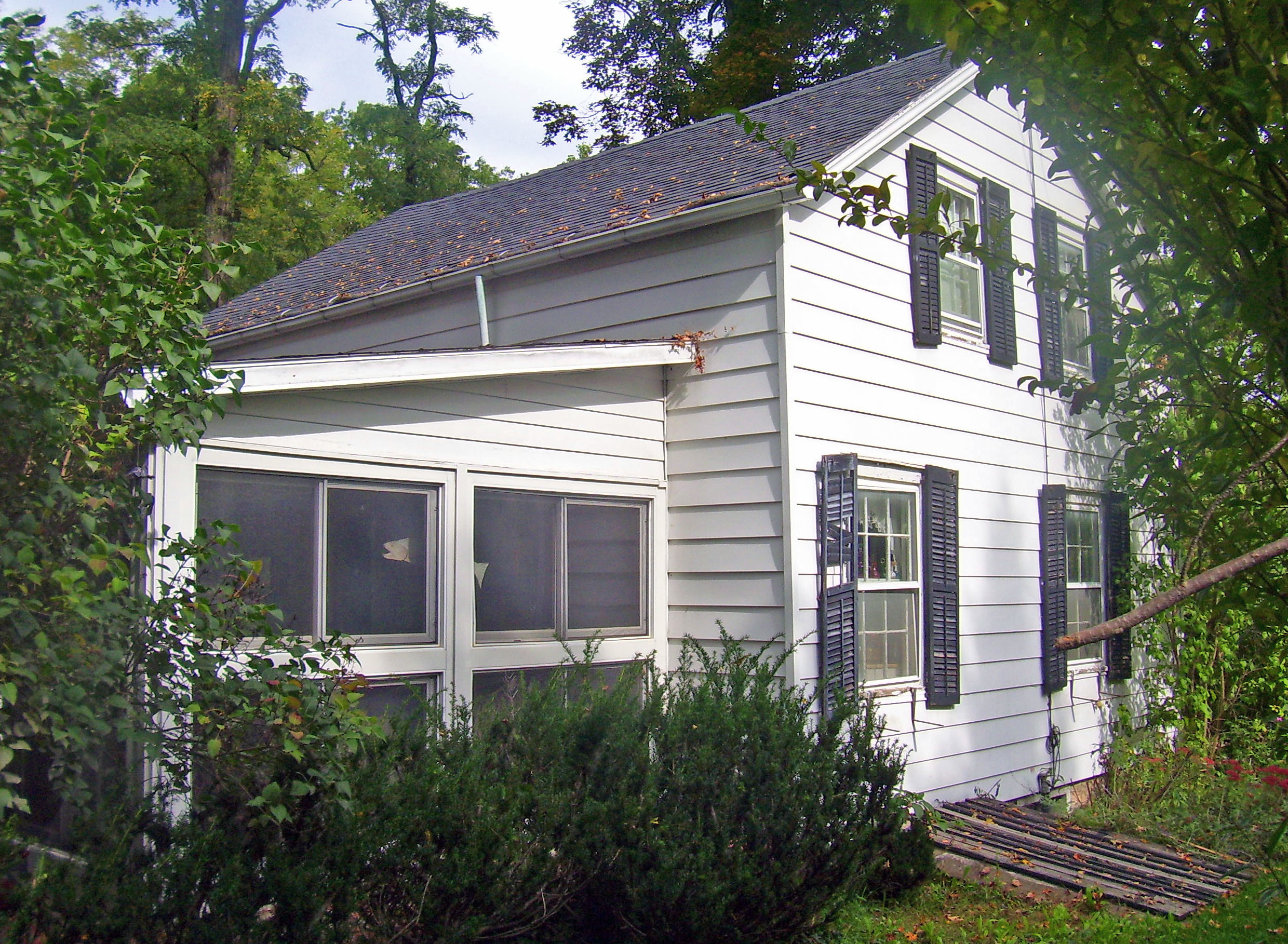
- South profile and west elevation of house, 2008

- Location within New York Location within the United States
- Location: High Falls, NY
- Nearest city: Kingston
- Coordinates: 41°49′25″N 74°7′51″W
- Area: less than one acre
- Built: 1848
- NRHP reference No.: 98001010
- Added to NRHP: August 06, 1998

The Lock Tender's House and Canal Store Ruin is located on Canal Road in High Falls, New York, United States. It is a complex along the former route of the Delaware and Hudson Canal built in the middle of the 19th century.

The Lock Tender's House is one of the few surviving such structures along the length of the canal in New York or Pennsylvania. The store ruins are also one of the few remnants of the canal's ancillary buildings. Both can be seen from a nearby public trail along the canal bed. In 1998 the property was listed on the National Register of Historic Places.

== Property ==
The house and ruin are located on a wooded half-acre lot on the north side of Canal 0.1 mile (150 m) west of Mohonk Road (Ulster County Route 6A), a short distance south of downtown High Falls. The property slopes down from the road slightly towards the dry bed of the former canal, a National Historic Landmark for its entire length. It is extensively landscaped, with mowed lawns, terraced gardens and 25 mature black locust trees.

Some canal facilities remain, including two snubbing posts used to tie up barges in the lock that are considered contributing resources to the National Register listing. The publicly owned Five Locks Walk runs along the other side of the canal, allowing a view of the property. West of the canal bed and walk the area remains wooded and undeveloped. There is another house, and the High Falls firehouse, a short distance down Canal on the same side; across it are woodlots buffering a field.

=== House ===
The house itself is set 15 feet (4.6 m) back from the road. It is a small two-story two-by-two-bay frame structure on a stone foundation with a gabled roof shingled in asphalt. Aluminum siding covers the original clapboard on the exterior. On the west (front) elevation is an enclosed porch with concrete deck. A screened shed-roofed porch is on the west side with a hip-roofed bay window on the east. On the south is a bulkhead entrance to the cellar with unpainted board-and-batten doors.

Inside the main entrance, a paired Dutch door with original hardware, is a large main room with a smaller kitchen and dining room. The main room has beaded chair rail and baseboard and windows with original camlocks. Two original paneled doors with thumb latches lead into the other rooms. All are finished with the original 7-to-9-inch (18 to 23 cm) tongue and groove pine flooring and wall and ceiling plaster. The dining room floor has a tin strip patch.

An original wooden stair along the east leads to the upstairs. It has a similar plan, with a large master bedroom complemented by two smaller chambers. As with the first floor, much of the trim is original, with pine flooring and plaster walls throughout and chair rail in the master bedroom. The bedroom doors have original hardware; antique locks were added to the bathroom and closet doors. The original chimney, cut off at the roof line, is also visible on this floor. A small wood hatch leads to the attic, where the sawn rafters of the roof have skip sheathing and no ridge pole.

From the first floor, the same stairs lead down to the basement. It has a concrete floor and single pane windows on the north and south. A mortise and tenon frame surrounds a board-and-batten door to the stone steps that lead to the outside bulkhead entrance.

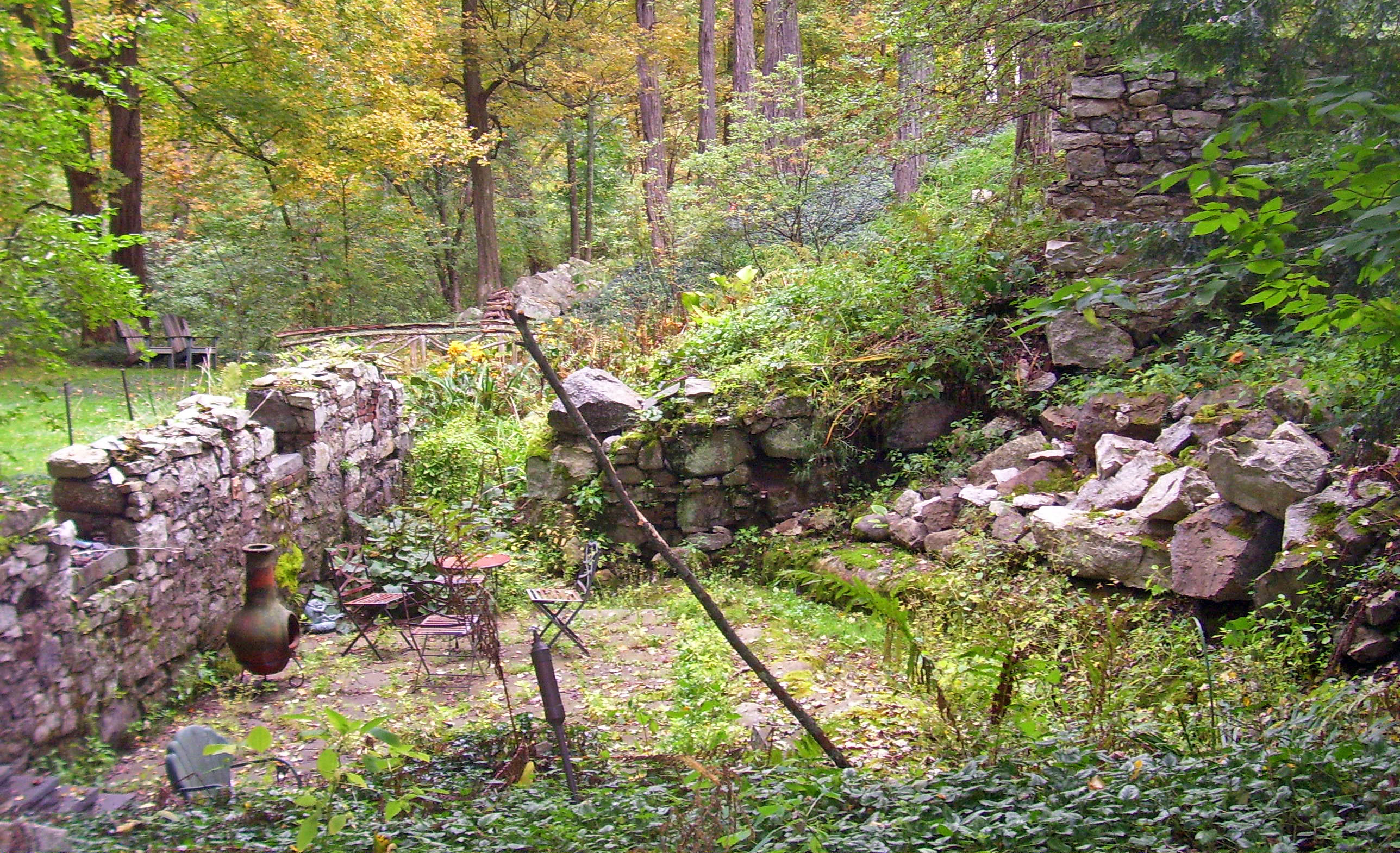
The canal store ruin, today used as a patio

=== Store ruin ===
The stone foundation for the canal-operated general store building is to the west of the house and downhill, at the northwest corner of the property. It is 33 by 40 feet (10 by 12 m), made of stone walls two feet (61 cm) thick. Two window openings face the canal, with bluestone sills still in place. There are remains of sand mold bricks and brick walls along two sides along with some of the original lintels in the debris. Directly across the canal bed is the stone foundation of the store's former warehouse.

The site has a partial brick floor. It is currently used by the owners as a freestanding patio, with a small set of furnishings.

== History ==
In 1828, the year of the canal's opening, local landowner Simeon DePuy (owner of the nearby stone house now used as a restaurant), granted the 93 acres (38 ha) including the grounds of the future house to his daughter Maria Dewitt. Twenty years later, she sold 21.5 of those acres (8.6 ha) to her sister, Sarah Robinson, and her husband Abraham, for $2,250 ($84,000 in contemporary dollars). As part of the same transaction, 5.3 acres (2.1 ha) were sold to the Delaware and Hudson Canal Company for an ongoing expansion of the canal to accommodate larger barges and compete more effectively with railroads, which had not existed when the canal was built to ship anthracite coal from the mines of Northeastern Pennsylvania to New York City via the Hudson River at what is now Kingston.

This expansion of capacity required an extensive rerouting at High Falls, taking the canal directly up the slope south of the hamlet. Six new locks, Nos. 15–20, would be necessary to take it up 70 vertical feet (21.3 m) in a quarter-mile (400 m). The small parcel was necessary to build and expand the canal. The company had an easement allowing unlimited access to the property during the construction, and also permitting it to dispose of debris and waste from that work on neighboring properties. A line of leftover scree from that time remains along the canal bed near the house and ruin today.

Once the expansion was finished, the land was deeded back to the Robinsons with the exception of the new canal alignment, its towpath (part of which is today the Five Locks Walk) and a half-acre meant to be used as housing for the lock tender. It first appears on the local tax rolls as a "lock house" in 1849, suggesting it was complete and occupied by then.

The lock tender's job was to take barges through the locks and maintain their water level. His salary, based on an 1880 census form, was $576 ($19,000 in contemporary dollars) Since the former could take a long time, and barges could come through as early as 5 a.m. and as late as 10 p.m., two years after the house was built a general store and warehouse were constructed on either side of the canal, allowing barge crews to stock up on provisions for the remainder of a journey that often took two weeks.

Sarah Robinson sold her property, which included the warehouse and store, to her sons in 1853. They in turn sold it to Jacob Hasbrouck two years later, and then in 1860 he sold it to Charles Hardenbergh, a farmer and merchant who lived in another nearby Canal Road house. He remained the owner and operator of the store until 1892.

At the end of the 19th century, the canal, by then a relic of an earlier, pre-industrial age, ceased operations. At that time Esther van Wagenen, an heiress of the Robinsons, bought the half-acre with the lock tender's cottage. Ten years later, her sister Mary inherited the house. She added the bay window to the dining room during the 1920s, and bequeathed the property upon her death in 1936 to another family member, Cynthia van Wagenen. She bought the store property in 1943, bringing the lot to its present size.

Cynthia van Wagenen installed modern forced-air heating in the house in the 1950s, but did not add modern plumbing. After her death in 1961, the house was used as a rental property by her estate for several years and then sold. Subsequent owners drilled a well and added indoor plumbing. One, an avid lock collector, added several period locks to the doors upstairs.

The house and ruin, still privately owned, have remained part of the historical attraction of the nearby Five Locks Walk, which follows the towpath. An estimated 4,000 people see it annually. It features on the walking tour of High Falls sponsored by the nearby Delaware and Hudson Canal Museum.

== See also ==
- National Register of Historic Places listings in Ulster County, New York
