= Delaware and Hudson Canal =

Former canal in New York and Pennsylvania, United States

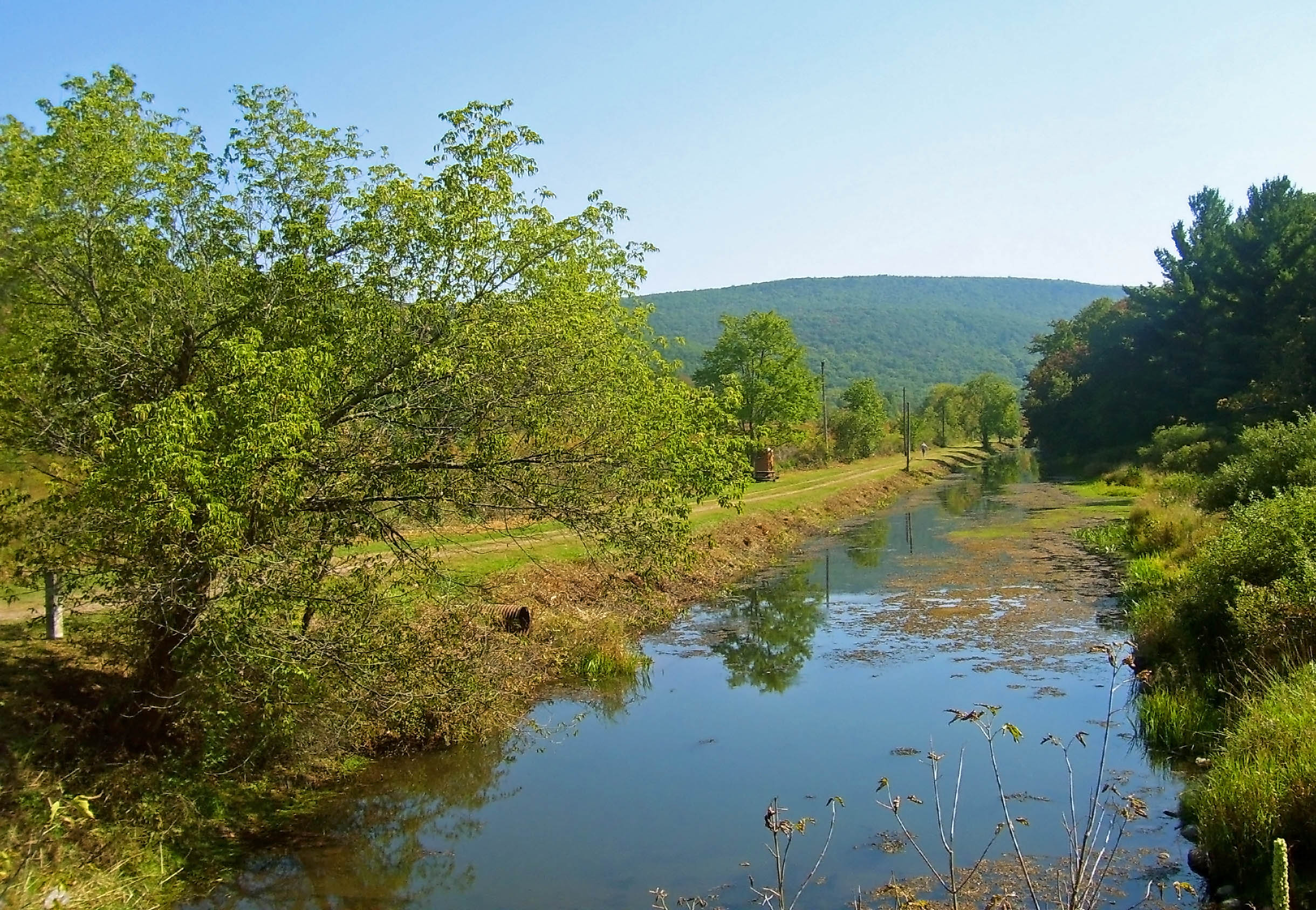
- A remaining section of the canal in Sullivan County, NY, used as a linear park
- Interactive map of Delaware and Hudson Canal

Specifications
- Length: 108 miles (174 km)
- Locks: 108
- Maximum height AMSL: 1,075 ft (328 m)
- Status: Closed, partially infilled
- Navigation authority
- Delaware and Hudson Canal
- U.S. National Register of Historic Places
- U.S. National Historic Landmark
- NRHP reference No.: 68000051

Significant dates
- Added to NRHP: November 24, 1968
- Designated NHL: November 24, 1968

History
- Original owner: Delaware and Hudson Canal Company
- Construction began: 1825
- Date of first use: 1828
- Date closed: 1902

Geography
- Start point: Honesdale, PA
- End point: Kingston, NY

The Delaware and Hudson Canal was the first venture of the Delaware and Hudson Canal Company, which would later build the Delaware and Hudson Railway. Between 1828 and 1899, the canal's barges carried anthracite coal from the mines of northeastern Pennsylvania to the Hudson River and then to market in New York City.

Construction of the canal involved some major feats of civil engineering, such as the construction of the Delaware and Hudson Gravity Railroad, and resulted in the development of some new technologies, particularly in rail transport. Its operation stimulated the city's growth and encouraged settlement in the sparsely populated region. Unlike many other canals of that era, the canal remained a profitable private operation for most of its existence.

The canal was declared a National Historic Landmark in 1968. The canal was abandoned during the early 20th century, and much of it was subsequently drained and filled. Some fragments remain in New York and Pennsylvania.

== History ==
=== Before the canal ===
During the early 19th century, Philadelphia businessman William Wurts often would leave his affairs for weeks at a time to explore the then-sparsely populated northeastern part of Pennsylvania. He began noticing, mapping, and researching blackish rock outcroppings, becoming the first explorer of the anthracite fields that have since become known as the Coal Region. He believed they could be a valuable energy source, and brought samples back to Philadelphia for testing.

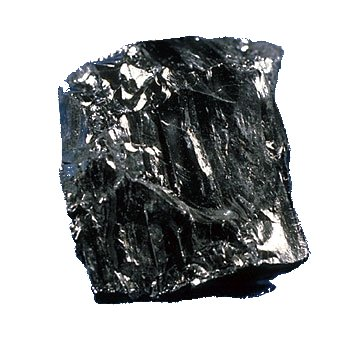
Anthracite coal

Eventually, he convinced his brothers Charles and Maurice to come along with him and see for themselves. Starting in 1812, they began buying and mining large tracts of inexpensive land. They were able to extract several tons of anthracite at a time, but lost most of what they tried to bring back to Philadelphia due to the treacherous waterways that were the main method of transportation in the interior. While the southern reaches of the Coal Region were already beginning to supply Philadelphia, they realized that the areas they had been exploring and mining were well-positioned to deliver coal to New York City, which had experienced an energy shortage after the War of 1812, when restrictions were placed on the import of British coal. Inspired by the new and successful Erie Canal, they conceptualized a canal of their own from Pennsylvania to New York, through the narrow valley between the Shawangunk Ridge and the Catskill Mountains, to the Hudson River near Kingston, a route followed by the Old Mine Road, America's first long-distance transportation route.

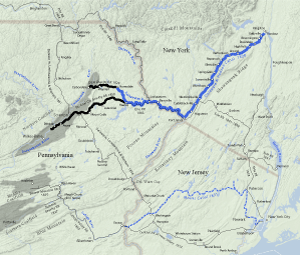
D&H Canal map, showing feeder railroads and competition, circa 1865

After several years of lobbying by the Wurtses, the Delaware and Hudson Canal Company was chartered by separate laws in the state of New York and commonwealth of Pennsylvania in 1823, allowing William Wurts and his brother Maurice to construct the Delaware and Hudson Canal. The New York law, passed April 23, 1823, incorporated "The President, Managers and Company of the Delaware and Hudson Canal Company", and the Pennsylvania law, passed March 13 of the same year, authorized the company "To Improve the Navigation of the Lackawaxen River". The company hired Benjamin Wright, who had engineered the Erie Canal, and his assistant John B. Jervis to survey and plan a route. A primary challenge was the 600-foot (180 m) elevation difference between the Delaware River at Lackawaxen and the Hudson at Rondout. Wright's initial estimated cost of $1.2 million was later revised to $1.6 million (in 1825 dollars).

To attract investment, the brothers arranged for a demonstration of anthracite at a Wall Street coffeehouse in January 1825. The reaction was enthusiastic, and the stock oversubscribed within hours.

=== Construction ===
Ground was first broken on July 13, 1825. After three years of labor by 2,500 men, the canal was opened to navigation in October 1828. It began at the Rondout Creek at an area known later as Creeklocks, between Rondout (at the creek's outlet to the Hudson River) and Rosendale. From there, it proceeded southwest alongside Rondout Creek in the direction upstream to Ellenville, continuing through the valley of the Sandburg Creek, Homowack Kill, Basha Kill and down the valley of the Neversink River to Port Jervis on the Delaware River. At that point, the canal ran northwest on the New York side of the Delaware River, crossing the river into Pennsylvania at Lackawaxen and running along the north bank of the Lackawaxen River to Honesdale.

To get the anthracite from the Wurts' mine in the Moosic Mountains near Carbondale to the canal at Honesdale, the canal company built the Delaware and Hudson Gravity Railroad. The Commonwealth of Pennsylvania authorized its construction on April 8, 1826. On August 8, 1829, the D&H's first locomotive, the Stourbridge Lion, made history as the first locomotive to run on rails in the United States.

=== Success and decline ===
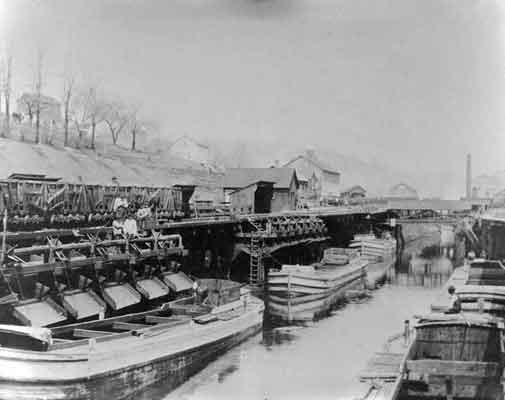
Barges awaiting coal loads in the basin at Honesdale

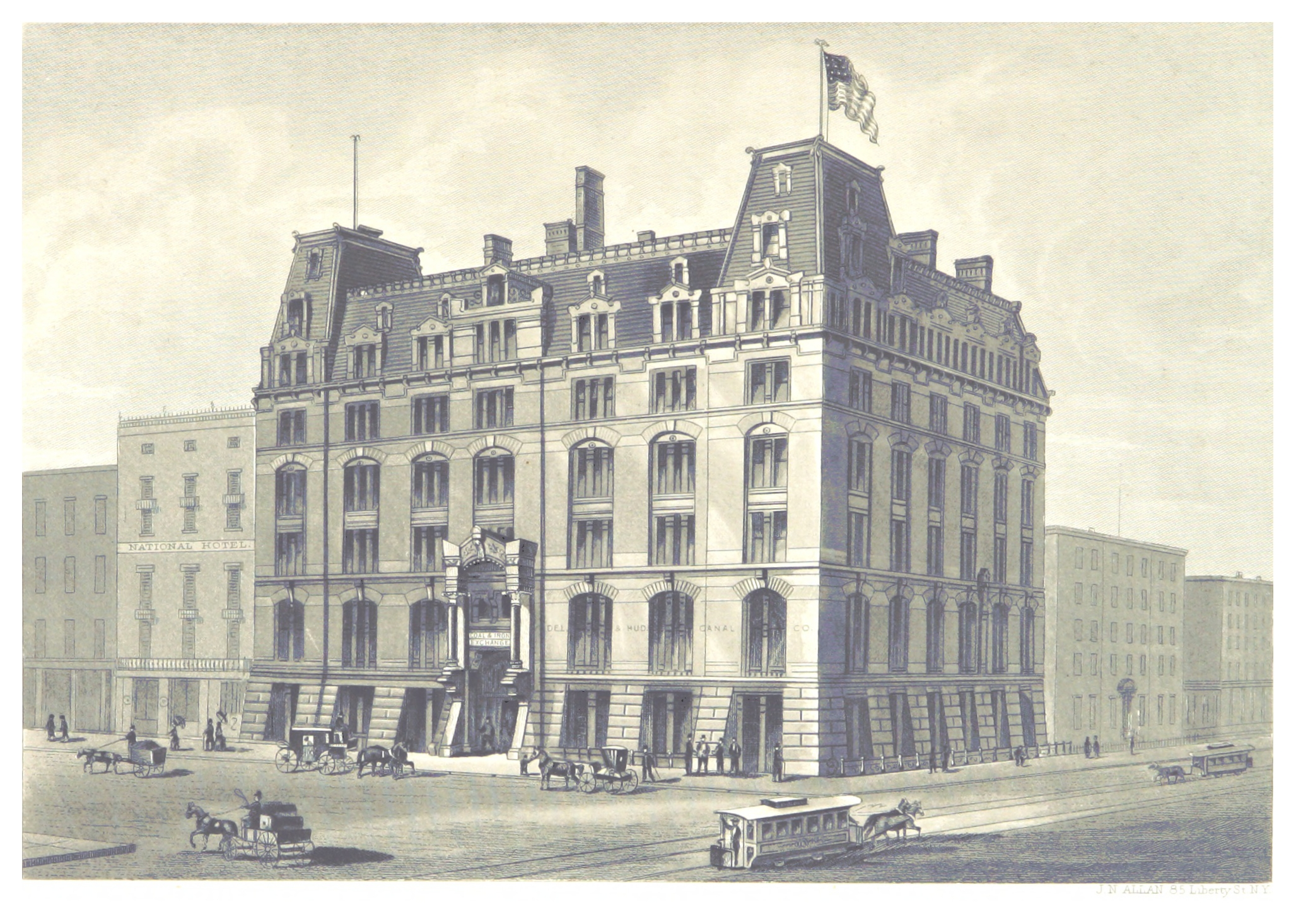
Delaware and Hudson Canal Company building as seen in 1876. It was on the southeast corner of Cortlandt and Church Streets in Manhattan. The building was commonly called "The Coal and Iron Exchange".

Business developed rapidly as the Wurtses had anticipated, and in 1832 the canal carried 90,000 tons (81,000 tonnes) of coal and three million board-feet (7,080 m³) of lumber. The company invested the profits in improving the canal, making it deeper so larger barges could be used.

In 1850, the Pennsylvania Coal Company constructed its own gravity railroad from the coal fields to the port at Hawley and the canal enjoyed increased traffic, carrying more than 300,000 tons of PCC coal in the first season. However, the relationship between the two companies deteriorated after the canal attempted to increase tolls with the argument that canal improvements had reduced costs for the PCC. The dispute was decided by court decision in 1863, but by that time the Erie Railroad constructed its extension to Hawley and the PCC transferred its shipments to the railroad.

The D&H was also developing railroads, a technology that was continuing to improve and supplant canal transportation at the time, to extend its access to other Northeastern markets. The D&H also extended its gravity railroad from Carbondale deeper into the coal fields and expanded its capacity. By the time Maurice Wurts died in 1854, the company was reporting profits of 10-24% annually and had completely paid its original debt to both states.

The completion of the Erie Railroad through the Delaware Valley in 1848 and its branch to Hawley in 1863 began to affect the canal's business adversely, although it continued to be successful through the 1870s and '80s. During that time canals began to be perceived as quaint relics of pre-industrial times and began yielding to railroads across the country. In 1898, the Delaware and Hudson finally joined them, carrying its last loads from Honesdale to Kingston, as railroads could now carry coal more directly to the city, across New Jersey rather than via Kingston. The next year the company eliminated the word "Canal" from its name, the states authorizing it to abandon the canal if it deemed it suitable and concentrate on its railroad interests, which it did.

=== Post-closure ===
After the end of the 1898 season, the company opened all the waste weirs and drained the canal. Catskill railroad magnate Samuel Coykendall purchased the canal the next summer, reportedly to benefit the Ramapo Water Company for use as a water supply resource However, that never happened. Instead, Coykendall used the northernmost section, from Rosendale to Rondout, to transport Rosendale cement and other general merchandise to the Hudson River until abandoning that business in 1904. The canal was never used again.

As the 20th century began, the company used some of the canal right-of-way for its expanding railroad operations; some of the rest was sold to various private companies, mainly other, smaller railroads. Some communities along the route also filled it in to expand their own neighborhoods, or for safety reasons as when a Port Jervis man supposedly drowned in it in 1900.

During the early 21st century residents of the town of Deerpark, north of Port Jervis, complained that the canal had been leaking water and causing flooding in the neighborhoods near Cuddebackville in recent years. Orange County, which maintains it in that area, met with town officials and local residents to discuss possible solutions.

=== Preservation as historic site ===
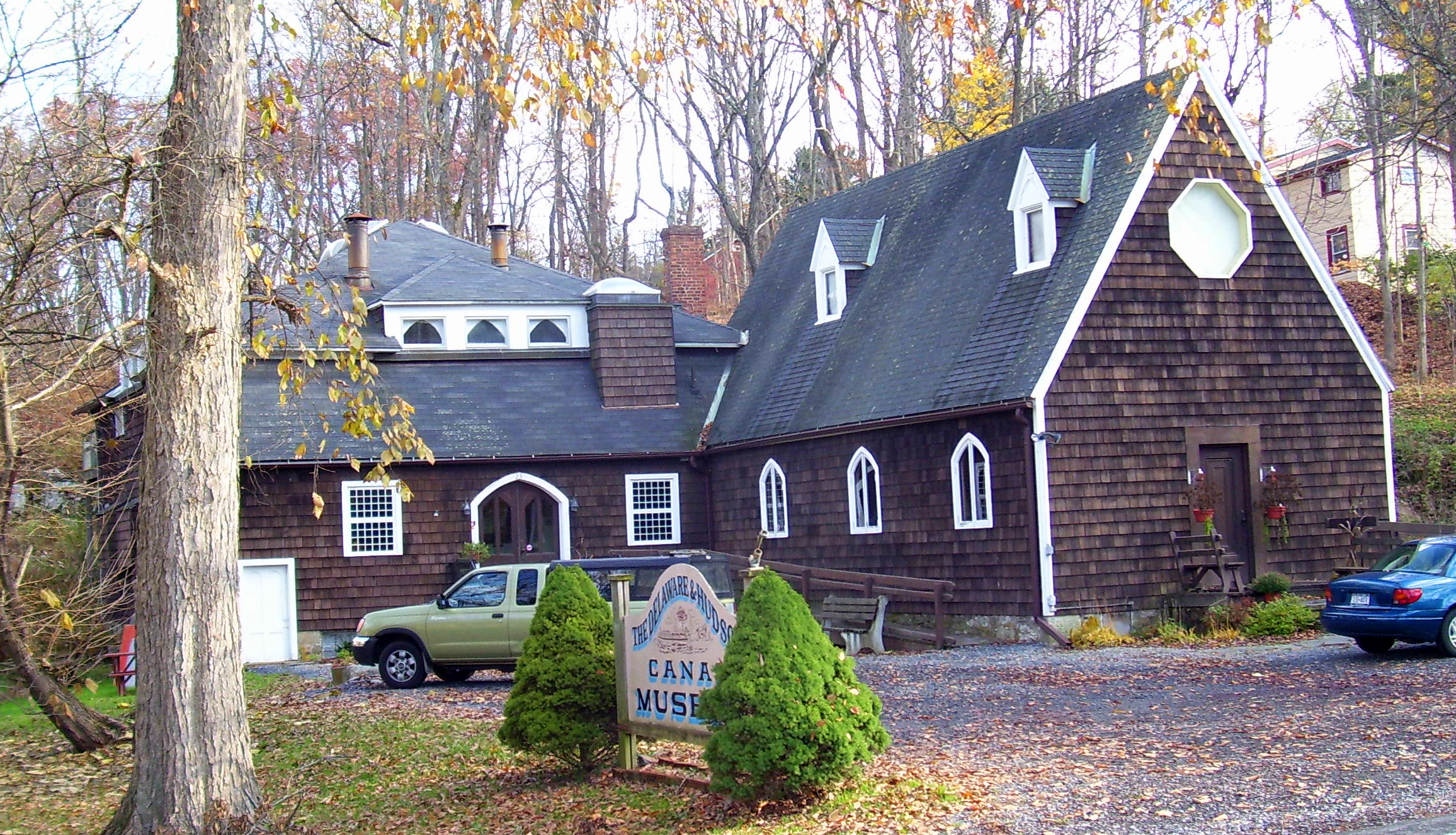
The Delaware and Hudson Canal Museum in High Falls, New York

Some of the ruins of the canal and its associated structures remain. The Delaware & Hudson Canal Historical Society was formed in 1967; its museum has an extensive education program and hosts hundreds of area students each season. The Neversink Valley Area Museum was formed in Orange County New York in 1968 and the National Park Service recognized the canal site in Orange County as a National Historic Landmark. In 1969, New York's Sullivan County bought a 4-acre (16,000 m^{2}) portion to develop as a park. Many other buildings and sites associated with the canal have been added to the National Register of Historic Places and state and local landmark lists.

== Canal ==
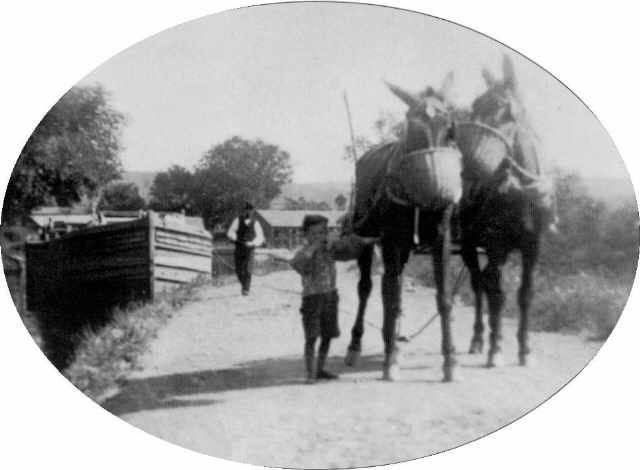
Child leading mules on the canal

The finished canal ran 108 miles (174 km), from Honesdale to Kingston (counting the tidewater portions of the Rondout where the canal joined the creek at Eddyville). Its 108 locks took it over elevation changes totaling 1,075 feet (328 m), more than the Erie Canal's 675 feet (206 m). The channel was four feet (120 cm) deep (eventually increased to six feet (1.8 m)) by 32 feet (9.8 m) wide. It was crossed by 137 bridges and had 26 dams, basins and reservoirs. Originally it crossed the four rivers along its course — the Lackawaxen, Delaware, Neversink and Rondout Creek — via slackwater dams. Aqueducts were built over the rivers to replace them by John Roebling in the 1840s, eliminating a few days from canal travel time and reducing accidents that were occurring at the Delaware crossing with loggers rafting their harvest downstream.

Barges were pulled by mules along the adjacent towpath, a power source employed even after the development of steam engines, since the bow wave from a faster steamboat would have damaged the channel. Children were often hired to lead the mules at first; in the canal's later years grown men were employed. They had to walk 15–20 miles (24–32 km) a day, pump out the barges and tend the animals. For this they were paid about $3 a month.

The canal was divided into three sections for operational purposes: the Lackawaxen, from Honesdale to the river Delaware; the Delaware, along the river from there to Port Jervis; and the Neversink, from Port Jervis to Rondout (now part of the city of Kingston) near the junction of Rondout Creek with the Hudson River. A voyage along its length took, initially, a week. It was closed on Sundays, and would suspend operations each winter when the canal froze or was likely to do so.

Its primary business was the transport of coal and lumber from the interior to the river Hudson, where it could be floated downstream to New York by river. There was little traffic to Pennsylvania other than empty barges. The company tried offering passenger service for a while, and Washington Irving, a friend of Hone's, made the trip during the 1840s, but it was ultimately ended as unprofitable.

== Legacy ==
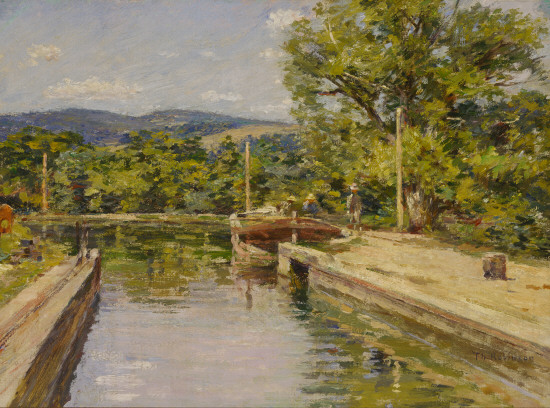
Canal Scene, one of a series of paintings of the Delaware and Hudson Canal at Port Ben that Theodore Robinson painted in 1893.

Besides its historical firsts, the canal's most significant effect was to help stimulate the growth of New York City along with the other anthracite canals. Fueled by the cheap and plentiful coal barged along the canal and the river Hudson, the city was able to develop and industrialize rapidly. The company's first president, Philip Hone, served a term as the city's mayor during the canal's construction. Later, John Roebling's experience building the canal served him well in designing the Brooklyn Bridge.

On the Pennsylvania end, the interior anthracite regions were able to grow and develop from the rough wilderness they had been when William Wurts traveled them and mapped the coal deposits. The viability of its anthracite encouraged selling to other markets as well, sustaining the region economically well into the 20th century.

Along its route, the canal created small communities at some of its stops. Some were named for canal executives. Honesdale was named for Philip Hone, the company's first president. The village of Peenpack, New York, renamed itself Port Jervis after the engineer soon after incorporating in 1853. Further north, the Wurtses are remembered by Wurtsboro, New York. A number of other New York communities with "port" in their name, such as Phillipsport, Port Orange, Port Benjamin and Port Jackson (now Accord) indicate their origins as canal towns. Summitville is named for its being the highest easterly point along the canal route.

As automobiles began to replace the transportation function of the railroads, which had once done the same to the canal, the general route of the canal was used as a highway route. Routes US 6 and PA 590 follow part of the route between Honesdale and Hawley, with 590 running along the towpath and now-dry bed as it continues east along the Lackawaxen River. The New York section of US 209 links the same communities in that state as the canal did, and intersects or is closely parallel to its remnants in several areas. Within towns, Canal Street follows the route in Port Jervis, as does Towpath Road in Ellenville and the Town of Wawarsing.

The canal resulted in improvements in other technologies as well. The Rosendale cement discovered while excavating the canal bed near that town in 1825 would not only provide the canal itself with a cheap building material but created an industry that sustained the region for some time.

== The canal now ==
After its designation as a National Historic Landmark, interest increased for preserving what remained of the canal during the late 1960s. The canal, its infrastructure and associated buildings survive in many areas along its length.

=== Pennsylvania ===
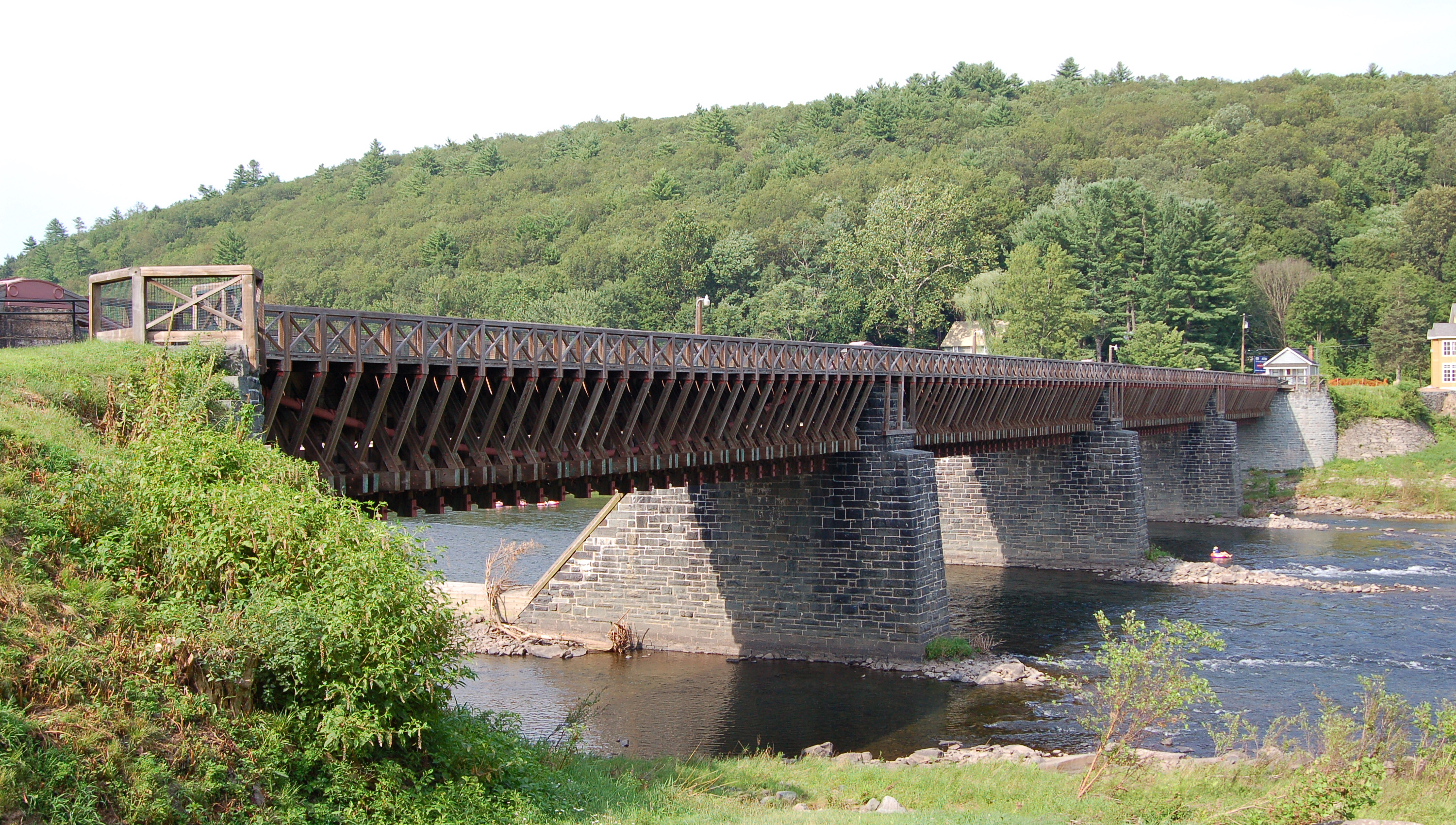
Roebling's Delaware Aqueduct, still in use

- Honesdale: The terminal basin site has a state historical marker, and traces of the gravity railroad route can still be seen. Some stretches of the bed are visible along Routes 6 and 590 as they approach town from the south.
- Lower Lackawaxen valley: Route 590 follows the bed and towpath in some areas, and Towpath Road follows the route in Pike County's Lackawaxen Township.
- Lackawaxen and Barryville, New York: Roebling's Delaware Aqueduct, the only one of the four on the canal still in use and a National Historic Civil Engineering Landmark as the oldest wire suspension bridge in the United States, was restored by the National Park Service and still carries automobiles over the Delaware River between the two states. Just north of the bridge, a former company office has been converted into a bed and breakfast.

=== New York ===
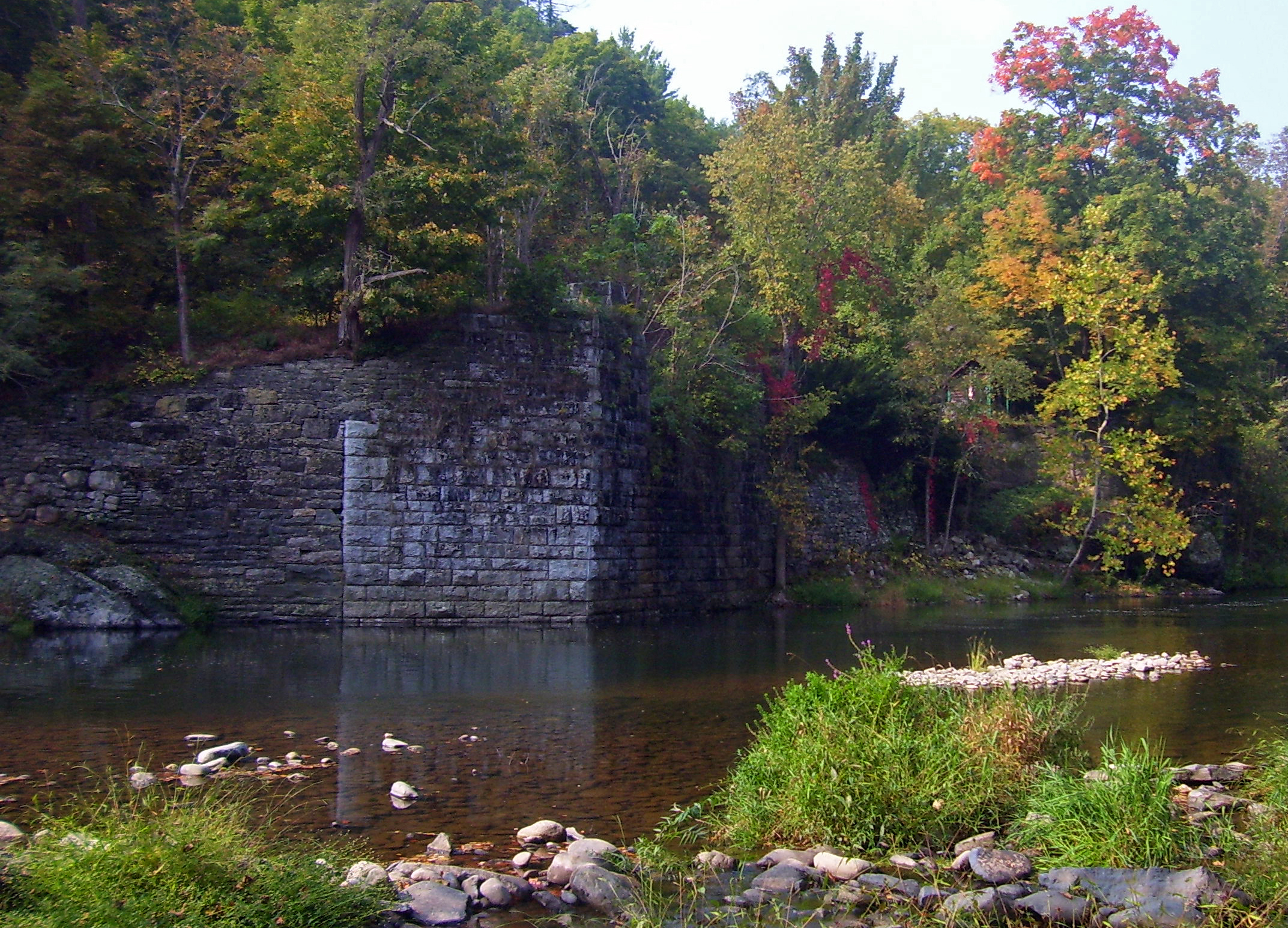
Aqueduct abutment on Neversink near Cuddebackville

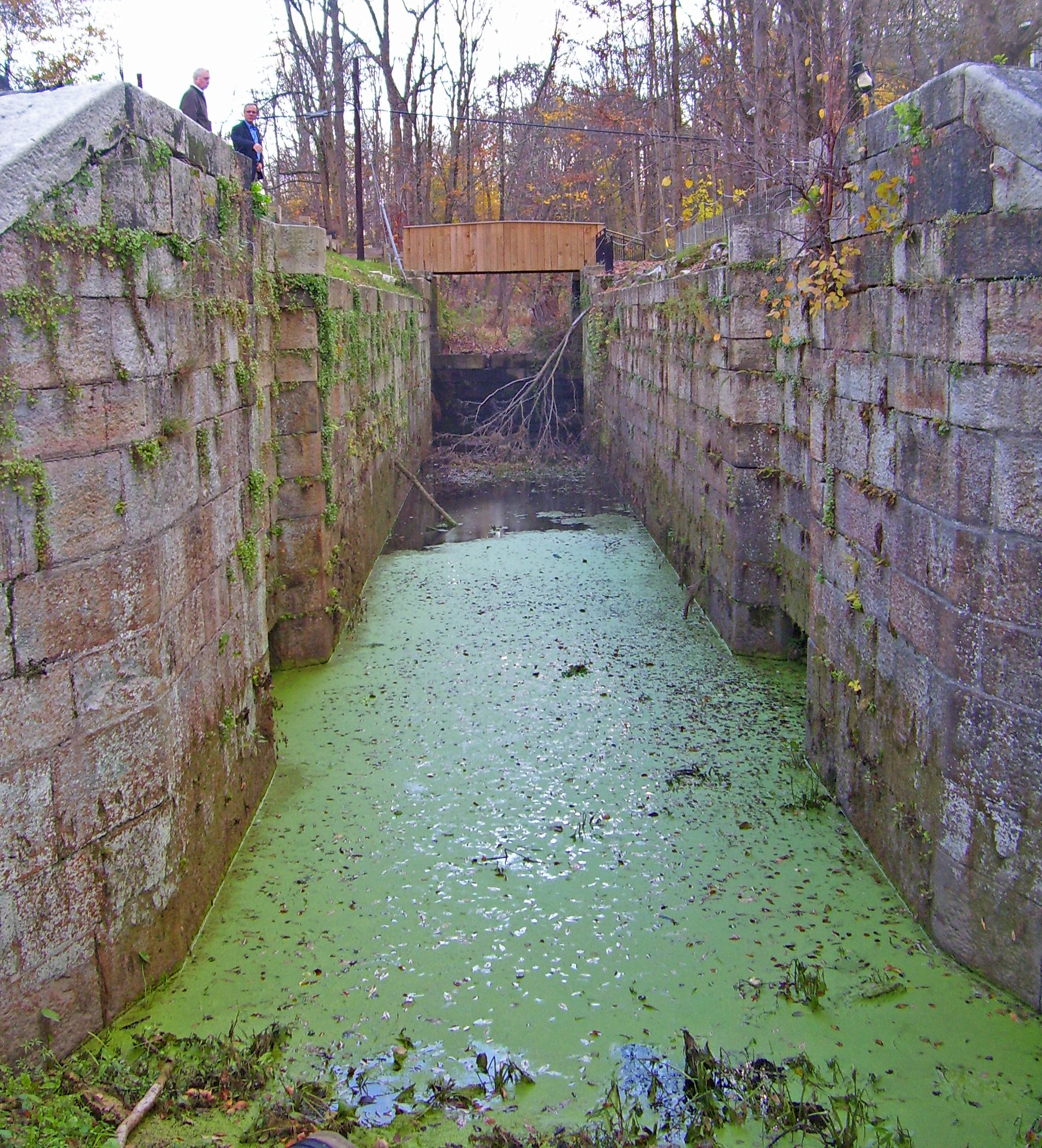
Lock No. 16 at High Falls

- Port Jervis: A portion of the old towpath near Park Avenue (NY 42/97) on the north end of the city has been paved and is used as a city park. Canal Street is the former bed, now filled. Fort Decker, the oldest building in the city, was used to house canal workers during construction.
- Cuddebackville: Orange County has developed a county park along the Neversink River, just south of Hamilton Bicentennial Elementary School off Route 209. The footings of Roebling's aqueduct still stand, and a portion of the bed and towpath persist in the adjacent woods. The Neversink Valley Museum, also located in the park, has some exhibits related to the canal.
- Sullivan County: maintains the largest remaining fragment of the canal, some of which is still wet, as the Delaware and Hudson Canal Linear Park. Hiking, cross-country skiing and jogging, bicycling and fishing are permitted along the 3.5-mile (5.6 km), 45-acre (18 ha) section near Summitville, north of Wurtsboro in the Town of Mamakating. Much of the land is beginning to return to its natural state due to the long years since the canal was abandoned. Some locks and other structures can be found from three different access points along US Route 209. The county park provides a seasonal interpretive facility at the northerly Bova Road access.
- Woodridge: Silver Lake Dam, some distance from the canal mainline, was built during the 1840s expansion to provide a reliable reservoir for the summit section of the canal.
- Ellenville: Towpath Road follows the old route from Route 209 south of the village to Canal Street (NY 52) within it, and a wet section of the bed remains just north of Canal Street in the woods adjacent to Berme Road just opposite the village's firehouse.
- Napanoch: A dry section of bed is located between Eastern Correctional Facility and the Rondout Creek, right next to the old Ontario and Western railroad station.
- High Falls: Several old locks are located here, near the site of the last of Roebling's aqueducts, as well as the canal museum. The downtown area was largely developed as a result of the canal.
- Rosendale The empty bed of the canal runs parallel to NY 213 between its crossing of the Rondout and Rosendale Village.
- Creeklocks: The northernmost lock still exists, as does the final section before the canal flowed into the Rondout Creek.
- Rondout: The former port of Rondout, the north end of the barges' route, has been recognized as the Rondout-West Strand Historic District and revitalized, still in use as a waterfront and a draw for visitors to the city. The area is now part of the city of Kingston.

== See also ==
- Morris Canal
- Delaware and Raritan Canal
- Delaware and Hudson Canal Gravity Railroad Shops
- List of canals in New York
- List of canals in the United States
- List of National Historic Landmarks in Pennsylvania
- List of National Historic Landmarks in New York
- National Register of Historic Places listings in Pike County, Pennsylvania
- National Register of Historic Places listings in Wayne County, Pennsylvania
- National Register of Historic Places listings in Orange County, New York
- National Register of Historic Places listings in Sullivan County, New York
- National Register of Historic Places listings in Ulster County, New York
