= Delaware and Hudson Canal Museum =

Museum in High Falls, New York, United States

Coordinates: 41°49′34″N 74°07′35″W

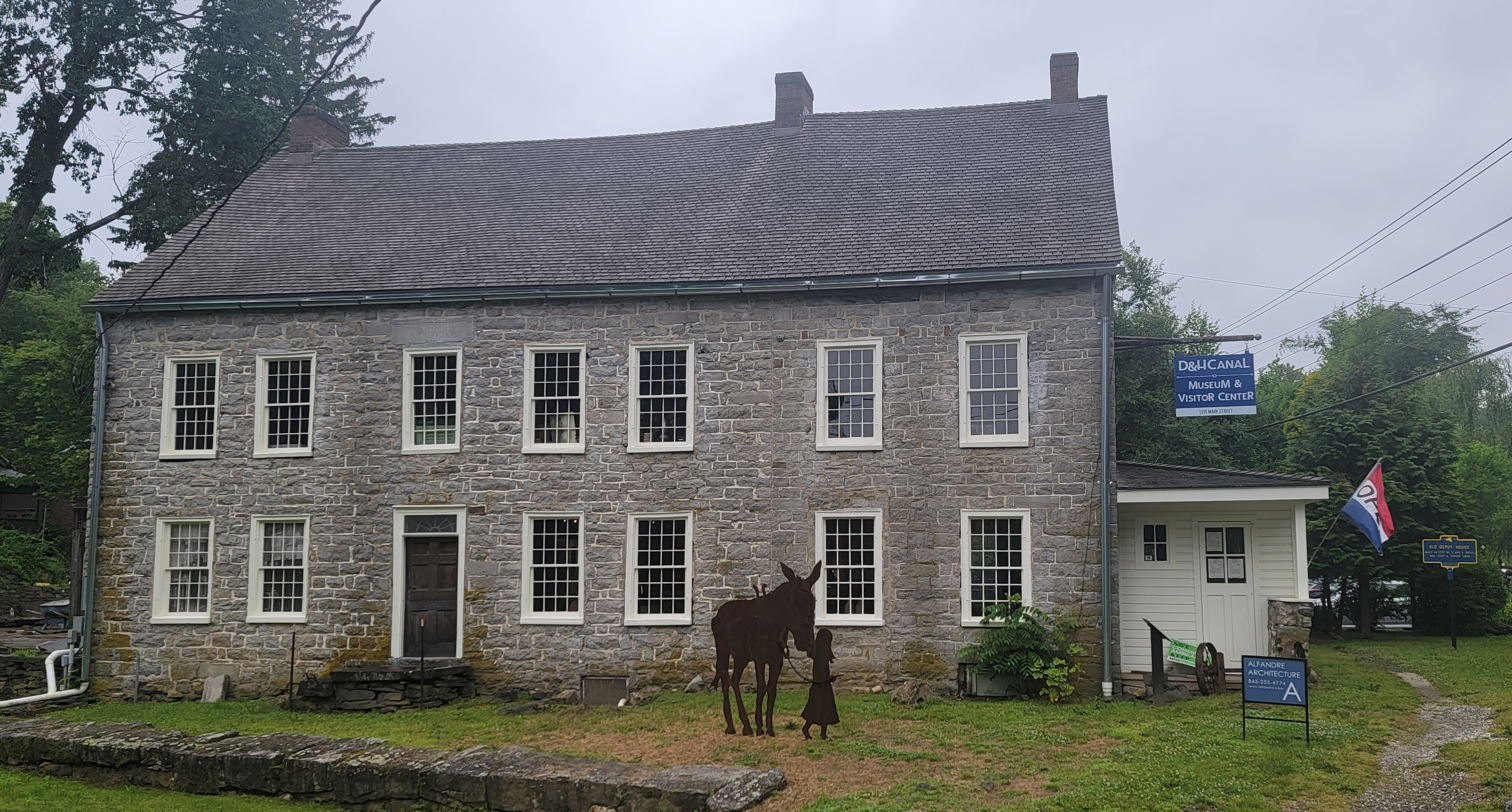
- The museum building
- Established: 1967
- Location: High Falls, NY, United States
- Type: Transport
- Website: Delaware and Hudson Canal Museum

The Delaware and Hudson Canal Museum is a museum in High Falls, New York, United States, specializing in the history and culture of the Delaware and Hudson Canal. It is located in the 1797 DePuy Tavern, D&H Canal Company Offices from 1850 to 1898. The building is a contributing property to the High Falls Historic District, listed on the National Register of Historic Places. The DePuy Tavern is also the site of the new Mid-Hudson Visitor Center, promoting over 100 attractions within a 35-mile radius of High Falls, NY. The museum's website, www.canalmuseum.org, links to their YouTube channel, D&H TV, with over 85 videos on this important American history, and has a map of all the publicly accessible extant D&H sites.

The museum includes approximately 4000 artifacts including maps, photographs, documents, models, paintings, and prints. It also maintains and operates a walking trail, the Five Locks Walk, which provides access to locks 16–20 of the former canal.

== See also ==
- List of maritime museums in the United States
