= Silver Lake (Woodridge, New York) =

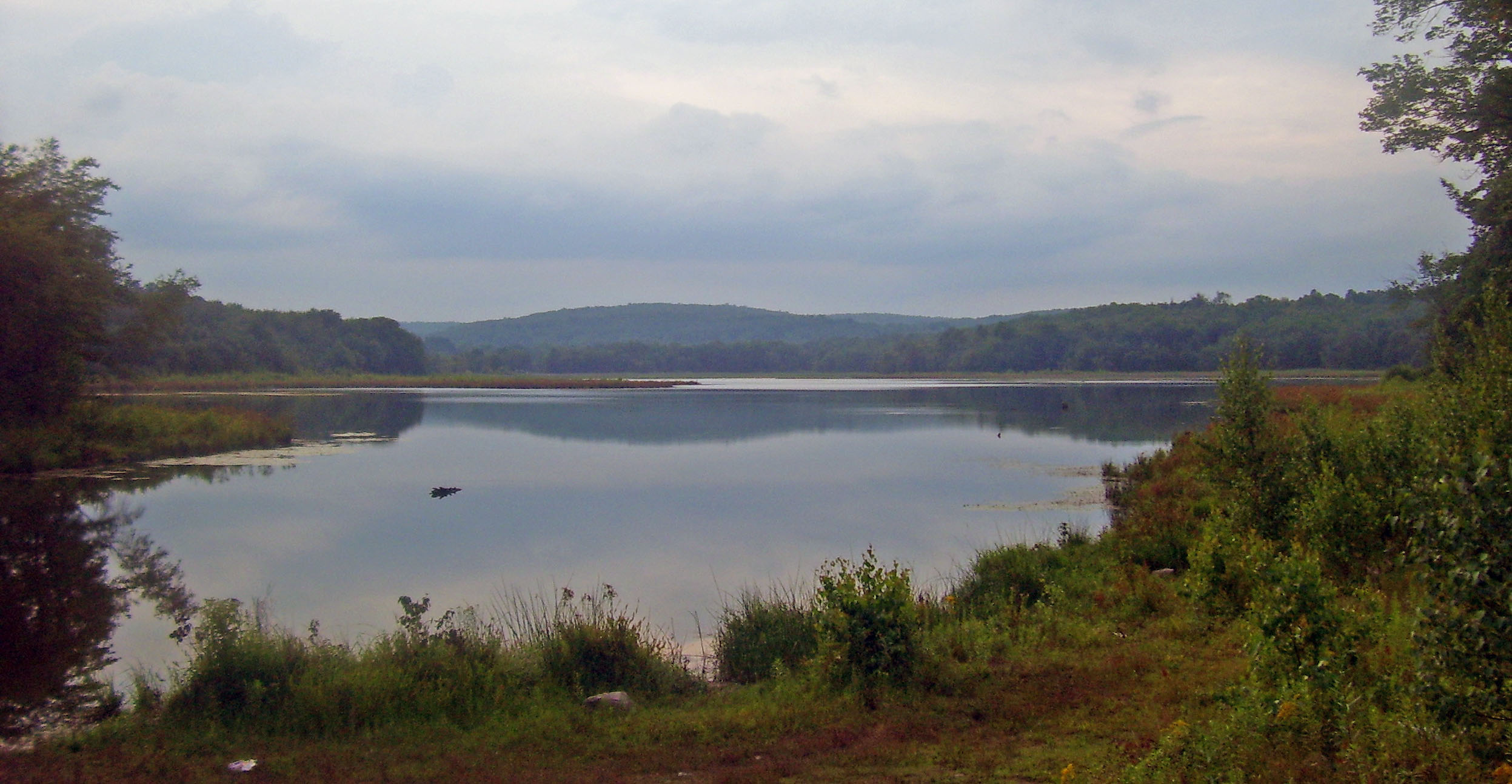
- View of lake from southeast end, near dam

- Location within New York Location within the United States
- Location: Sullivan County, New York
- Coordinates: 41°42′18″N 74°33′16″W
- Type: Artificial
- Primary inflows: Sandburg Creek
- Primary outflows: Sandburg Creek
- Basin countries: United States
- Max. length: 3,500 ft (1,100 m)
- Max. width: 1,000 ft (300 m)
- Surface area: 85 acres (34 ha)
- Surface elevation: 1,060 ft (320 m)
- Dam: Silver Lake Dam
- Settlements: Woodridge

Silver Lake, one of three by that name in Sullivan County, New York, United States, is located just southeast of the village of Woodridge. It was created in the 1840s when Sandburg Creek was dammed to provide reliable water for the "summit", or highest-elevation, section of the Delaware and Hudson Canal, between Wurtsboro and Napanoch. After the canal closed, the 85-acre (34 ha) lake that had been created, initially called Woods Lake, became an attraction for guests at the Jewish summer resort communities in that area of the Catskill Mountains.

The lake is irregularly shaped, along a northwest-southeasterly axis roughly two-thirds of a mile long, 85 acres (34 ha) in surface area when full. One bay on the south side is crossed by the former right-of-way of the New York, Ontario & Western Railway; a stone culvert underneath connects it with the main lake. The northwest end lies in the village of Woodridge, which has built a small park along the lake around a beach that established itself in the early resort days. Another beach developed at the opposite end, just north of the dam. There are some houses and businesses with lake frontage, but other than that its shores remain undeveloped.

In 1999, water undermined some sections of the original dam and caused a breach, draining the lake to merely one-quarter its size. The village sought and received state and federal grants to repair the dam and restore the lake, whose near-absence had hurt local business. However, the state Department of Environmental Conservation (DEC), the Conservation Commission's successor as regulator of dams, held up repairs while it considered whether to reclassify the dam as higher risk in case of failure, which could have raised the cost and forced a redesign. After eventually getting approval from DEC and putting the project out for bid, a redesign of the dam that preserved its historic character, the village suffered another setback when the lowest bid came back at $1.5 million, almost twice what the project had been budgeted for.

The village is in the process of building a wastewater treatment plant that will discharge into the lake along the south side just past its park. In 2006, the state Department of Environmental Conservation (DEC) had obtained a consent decree requiring that the village address the sewage spills that frequently occurred in heavy rains. It had been using a Town of Fallsburg plant some distance from the village, but that hadn't been enough.
