= Silver Lake Dam =

- U.S. National Register of Historic Places
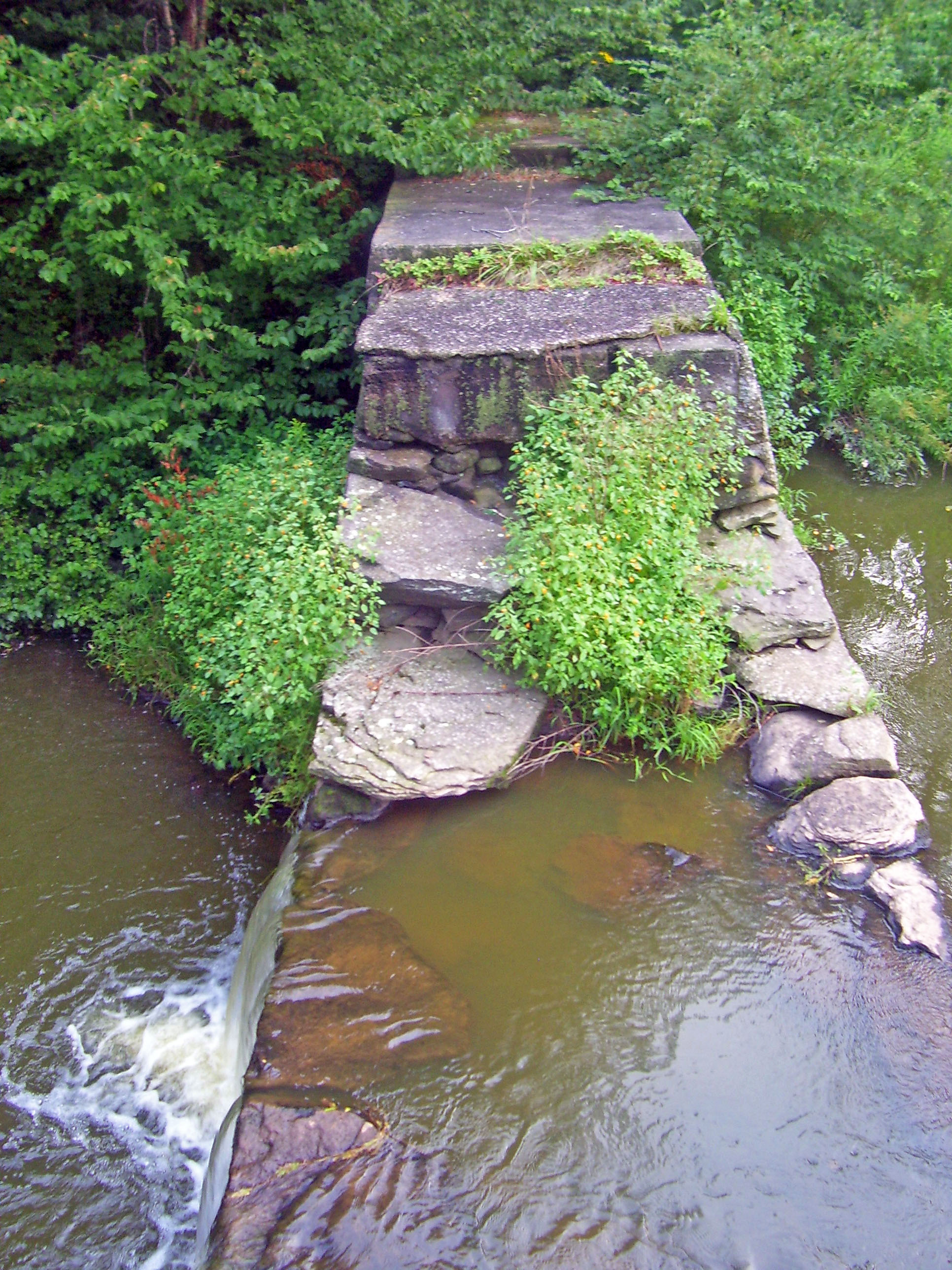
- Dam spillway from north, 2008
- Location: Woodridge / Fallsburg, NY
- Nearest city: Middletown
- Coordinates: 41°42′06″N 74°33′01″W
- Area: less than one acre
- Built: 1840s
- Architect: Rufus Lord, chief engineer
- NRHP reference No.: 00000585
- Added to NRHP: June 2, 2000

Silver Lake Dam is located off Silver Lake Road, just outside the village of Woodridge, New York, United States. It was built in the 1840s to regulate Sandburg Creek, which provided water to the summit of the Delaware and Hudson Canal 10 miles (16 km) to the southeast. In 2000 it was listed on the National Register of Historic Places.

The 85-acre (34 ha) body of water it created eventually became known as Silver Lake, an attraction for visitors to the many Jewish summer resorts in Woodridge and neighboring communities. In the early 21st century the village of Woodridge, which owns the dam, has been working to repair it due to a leak.

== Description ==
As built, the dam is a stone structure, with large mortared slabs encasing a dry rubble interior. It is 176 feet (54 m) long, 5 feet (1.5 m) wide along the top and rising 13 feet (4.0 m) above the water level on the downstream side. There was a centrally located spillway 11 feet (3.4 m) wide by 2 feet (50 cm) deep. Two 15-inch (38 cm) cast-iron waste pipes controlled by large gate valves in the top of the dam next to the spillway went through the bottom of the dam.

== History ==
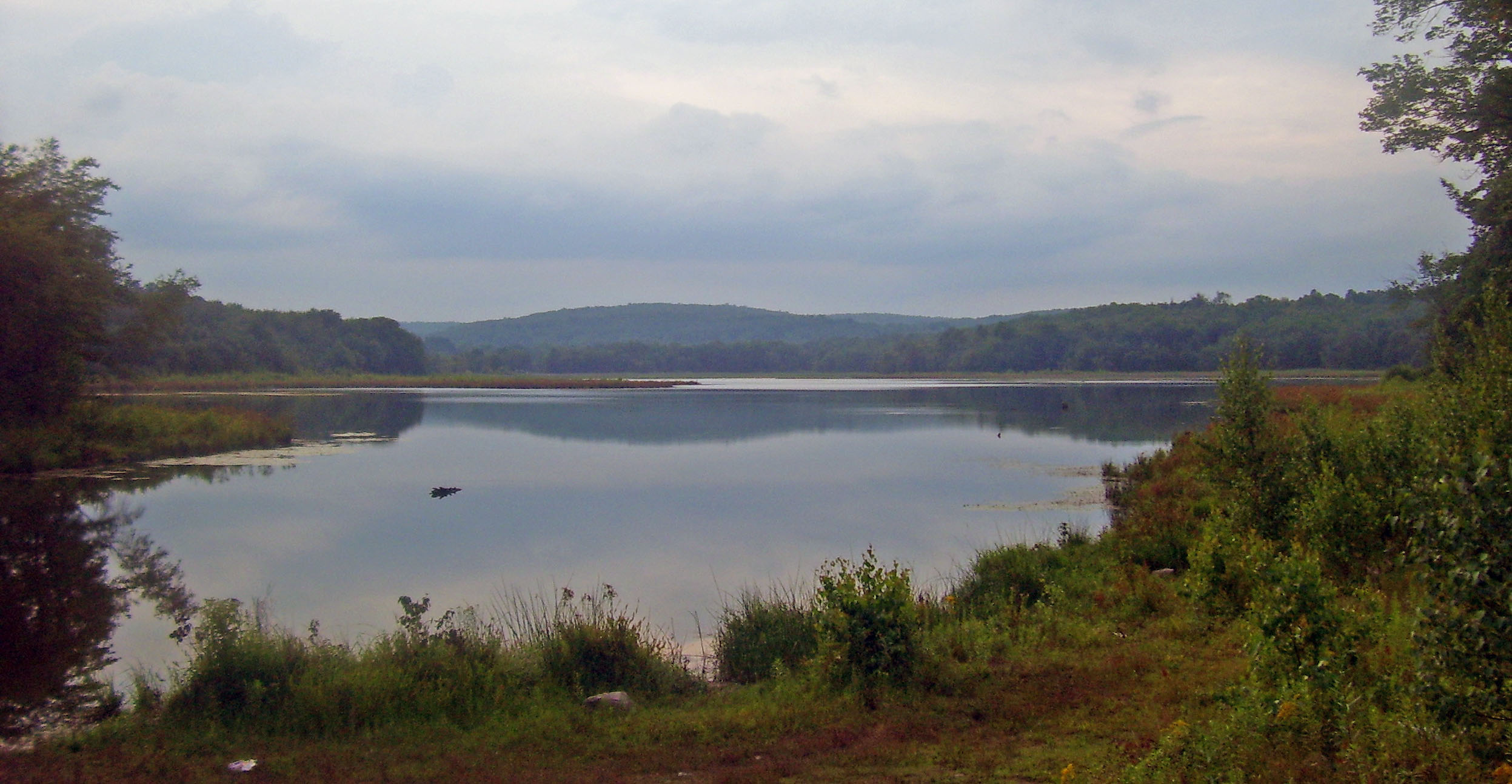
Silver Lake, Woodridge, New York, a lake in the Catskill Mountains

In the 1840s, improvements to the Delaware and Hudson Canal, which had been running through the town of Mamakating to the southeast for its first decade of operation, required a more reliable source of water for its crucial summit, or highest-elevation, section, between there and Napanoch. Sandburg Creek, which drains an area from around Woodridge down to near the canal's path at Wurtsboro before emptying into the Basha Kill, was identified as a creek which could be impounded to create a sufficient reservoir, and it was dammed at the appropriate spot, long before the area was developed and settled.

By 1895, as canal operations were winding down in the face of the displacement of that mode of transportation by railroads, which did not have to shut down in winter, records indicate the dam underwent major renovations and repair. The 1914 New York State Conservation Commission report that noted that also describes the dam as not markedly different from its original design or material.

At that time canal operations had ceased completely and the dam had become private property. The lake it created, referred to in the Conservation Commission report as Woods Lake, had become a major attraction for the new village of Woodridge and the Jewish summer resorts around it. Beaches developed at either end of the lake, and a few cottages were built along its shores.

In 1999, water undermined some sections of the original dam and caused a breach, draining the lake to merely one-quarter its size. The village sought and received state and federal grants to repair the dam and restore the lake, whose near-absence had hurt local business. However, the state Department of Environmental Conservation (DEC), the Conservation Commission's successor as regulator of dams, held up repairs while it considered whether to reclassify the dam as higher risk in case of failure, which could have raised the cost and forced a redesign. After eventually getting approval from DEC and putting the project out for bid, a redesign of the dam that preserved its historic character, the village suffered another setback when the lowest bid came back at $1.5 million, almost twice what the project had been budgeted for.
