= Ohave Shalom Synagogue (Woodridge, New York) =

Orthodox synagogue in Woodridge, New York

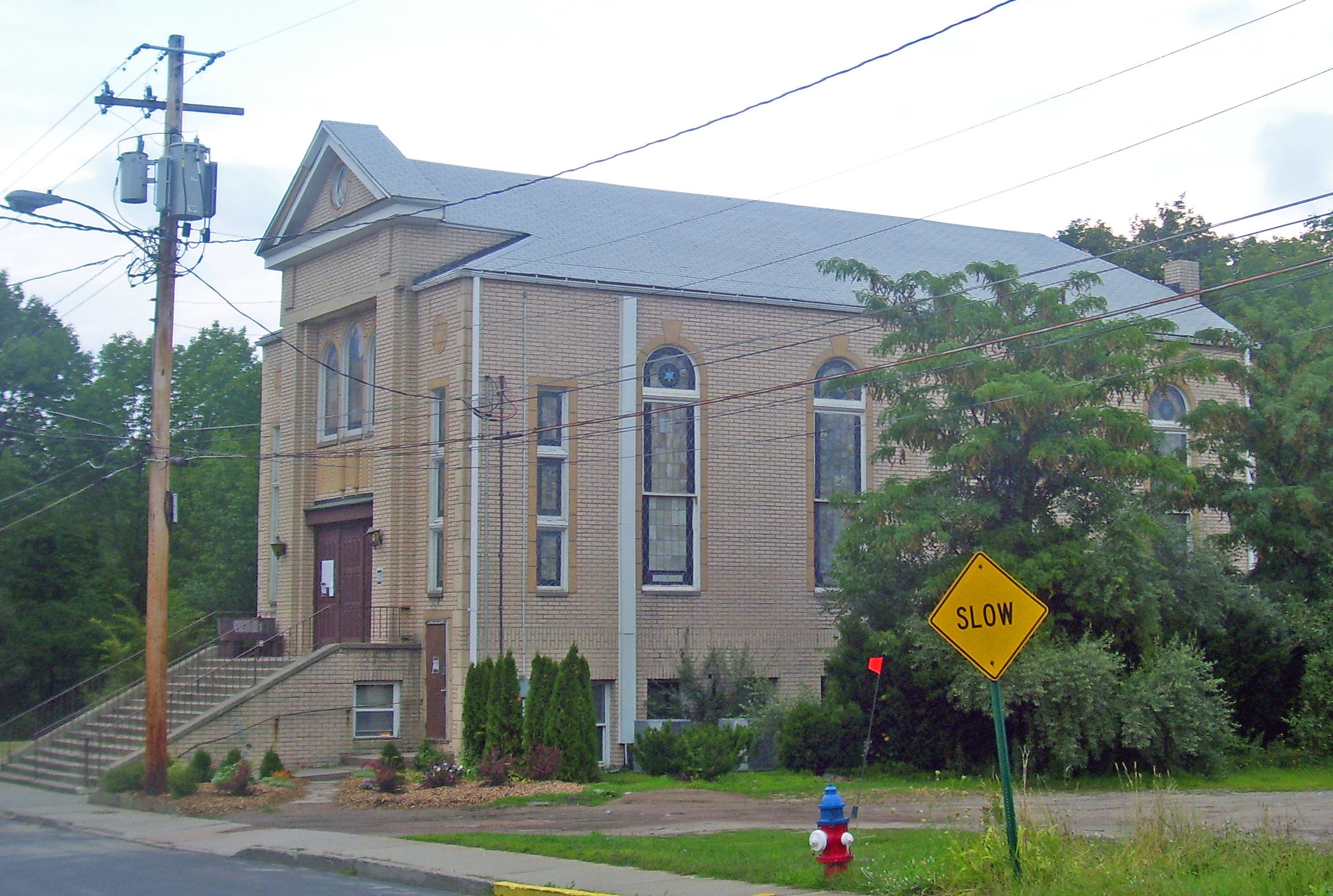
- South profile and west elevation, 2008

- Location in New York

Religion
- Affiliation: Orthodox Judaism
- Rite: Nusach Ashkenaz
- Ecclesiastical or organisational status: Synagogue
- Leadership: Rabbi Hillel Grossman
- Status: Active

Location
- Location: 14 Maurice Rose Street, Woodridge, New York 12789
- Country: United States
- Coordinates: 41°42′38″N 74°34′21″W

Architecture
- Architect: Abraham Okun
- Type: Synagogue
- Style: Various early 20th-century revivals
- Completed: 1930

Specifications
- Direction of façade: West
- Materials: Brick; concrete
- Ohave Shalom Synagogue
- U.S. National Register of Historic Places
- NRHP reference No.: 00001412
- Added to NRHP: November 22, 2000

Ohave Shalom Synagogue, also referred to as the Woodridge Shul, is an Orthodox Jewish synagogue, that practices in the Ashkenazi rite, located at 14 Maurice Rose Street in Woodridge, in the Catskills region of southeast New York, in the United States. The brick building was erected in 1930 by a splinter group from what was then the village's only synagogue, later absorbed into Ohave Shalom itself.

Its interior is decorated with paintings on religious themes. It was not the only synagogue in Sullivan County ever built with such decoration, but it is the only one where the paintings survive, although they are not as extensive as they were when the synagogue was built. The synagogue was listed on the National Register of Historic Places on November 22, 2000.

In 2020, the congregation launched an urgent appeal for funds to support the ongoing maintenance and restoration of the historical synagogue.

== Building ==
The synagogue is a five-by-three-bay one-story building on a raised basement. It is faced in decorative golden brick with quoins, banding and window trim. The front facade has a projecting extrance portico with pedimented gable and raking cornice. In the tympanum is a small round stained glass window.

The main entrance runs the length of the front facade. It consists of slightly recessed triple pairs of wooden doors beneath a tripartite window. The enframements resemble stone and the smaller windows have keystone lintels. Between the doors and windows, six decorative plaques frame a central scroll motif. Above the windows are Stars of David.

All but one of the side bays has a stained-glass window. The front bay on either elevation has a window like the end bays on the facade. The rear elevation has nearly full-height projecting bays with gable roof, each containing a stained-glass window like the ones along the sides. There is also a small shed-roofed addition that serves as the Torah ark.

The first floor is divided into a small lobby and the sanctuary, laid out in Orthodox tradition, with a central hexagonal bimah surrounded on three sides by wooden pews. A gallery that extends over the western third provides seating for women.

Both the ark platform and bimah are made of wood with turned posts and rounded tops. The ark is flanked with columns and topped with Lions of Judah holding the Ten Commandments. Above it the stained glass window has large sunbursts and Stars of David. Three decorative chandeliers hang from the barrel-vaulted ceiling.

The paintings are not as extensive as they originally were, but cover several locations. Wall panels depict holy places in Jerusalem, a continuous frieze depicts the signs of the zodiac, the gallery is backed with a landscape mural, and the one surviving ceiling image is the center medallion, a radiating fan shape with gold border.

== Aesthetics ==
Ohave Shalom combines features of traditional Eastern European synagogues and contemporary urban synagogue design. The former is reflected in the tripartite facade, meant to suggest the small corner towers of those synagogues. The latter is recalled by the large form and Renaissance Revival design.

== History ==
Jews had begun arriving in the area of what was then known as Centerville around 1900. They overcame early prejudice sufficiently for some to have been among the village's founding officers when it incorporated. Centerville's first synagogue, Anshei Centerville, was established in 1903.

Centerville was renamed Woodridge in 1917 in the hopes of attracting more summer visitors. By the 1930s, the village was primarily Jewish, and the center of that community within Sullivan County. A dispute among the congregants of Anshei Centerville over who would be the ritual slaughterer of animals led the founders of Ohave Shalom — mostly urbane and affluent — to buy the land and build the present building. Six years later, Anshei Centerville merged with its offshoot. Its home, a short distance away, was used as a daily worship house and school.

In the 1950s a more decorative brick veneer was added over the original painted concrete-block exterior. The original interior painting was in some cases, like the ceiling and reconfigured ark, painted over. In 1976 the original Anshei Centerville building was demolished, and a congregant named Max Cohen donated a house across the street from the synagogue to serve the functions it had. It has since been expanded to serve as a chapel and mikvah, and also stores some of the interior decor of Anshei Centerville. That building is not considered a contributing property to the NRHP listing since it is outside Ohave Shalom's period of significance.
