= High Falls Historic District =

Historic district in New York, United States

- U.S. National Register of Historic Places
- U.S. Historic district
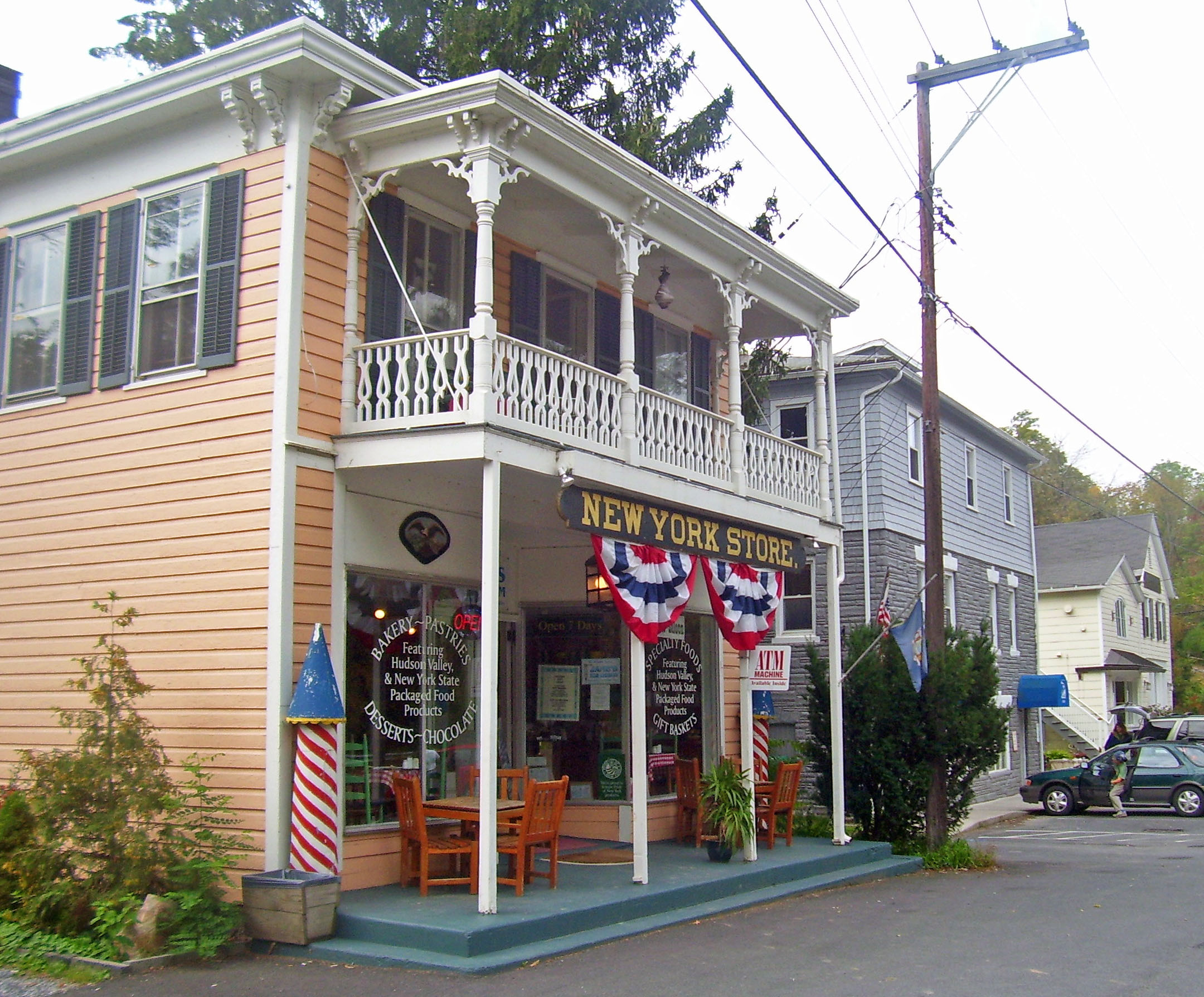
- Dales Store and other buildings on Main Street, 2008

- Location within New York Location within the United States
- Interactive map of High Falls Historic District
- Location: High Falls, NY
- Nearest city: Kingston
- Coordinates: 41°49′36″N 74°07′35″W
- Area: 21 acres (8 ha)
- Built: 1790–1940
- Architectural style: Various
- NRHP reference No.: 98001005
- Added to NRHP: August 6, 1998

The High Falls Historic District corresponds roughly to the downtown section of the hamlet of that name in Marbletown, New York, United States. It is a 21-acre (8.5 ha) area around the intersection of state highway NY 213, Main Street, Mohonk Road (Ulster County Route 6A0 and Bruceville Road just south of Rondout Creek.

Here the Delaware and Hudson Canal once crossed the creek on a large aqueduct, never rebuilt after it burned in the early 20th century. Several pieces of the canal's infrastructure, including some well-preserved locks and the canal's official National Historic Landmark plaque, are included in its 21 acres (8 ha). While the canal had the greatest effect on the small community, it has not been the only economic force acting on it over the years. It is considered a "distinctive example of mid-19th century semi-urban land use planning."

== Geography ==
The district is an irregularly shaped area centered on the junction of Bruceville, Mohonk and Route 213, mostly following lot lines. It follows Mohonk to an old church, then its boundary goes east to rear lot lines, then south to the town line at Route 213 with neighboring Rosendale.

It includes most properties along the south side of Route 213, and some along Bruceville almost to where it meets the creek. East of there it includes the former canal right-of-way, its empty bed extant, all the way down to the former aqueduct abutment. It goes no farther along 213 than the split between it and its former alignment, now Main Street. It includes the properties in the commercial area along the north side of Main Street and Firehouse Road and the canal as it goes uphill, with some of its locks, and then reaches its western extreme at a thin wedge along the canal's earlier route along the north side of Main.

Within these boundaries are 33 buildings, only four of which are considered non-contributing to the district's historic character. There are also five structures, all former canal locks. The buildings range from the late 18th century to the mid-20th, and the canal infrastructure was mostly built in the middle of the 19th. The entire area is developed except for the short stretch of canal north between 213 and the creek, which is wooded.

== History ==
High Falls takes its name from the nearby feature on the Rondout, where the creek cuts through a large rock formation and goes over a large waterfall. It was an attractive source of water power, and millers were drawn to it from colonial times. The first bridge to nearby Stone Ridge, on the main road through the valley between the Shawangunks and Catskills, was built during this time. The stone Simeon DePuy Tavern, now the home of the D&H Canal Historical Society, who opened their new Museum and Visitor Center in that structure in 2022, from 1797 (expanded in mid-19th century), reflects this era and retains much of its original fabric.

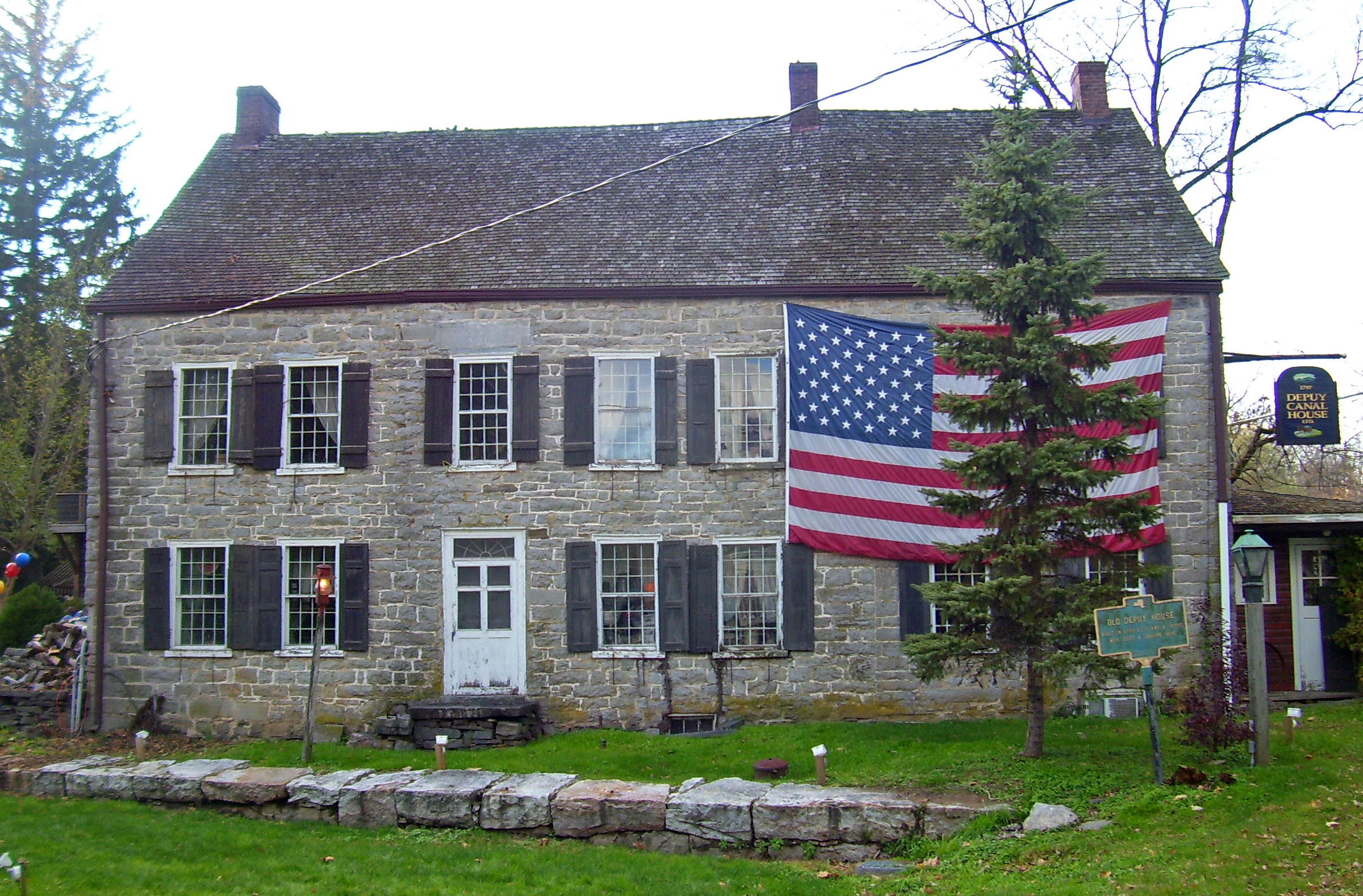
The Simeon DePuy Tavern

In the early 19th century, a cotton and woolen factory in the hamlet made it a center of local manufacturing, serving many of the farms in the surrounding area. This set the stage for the construction and opening of the canal in 1828. The D & H was built to transport anthracite coal from Northeastern Pennsylvania to New York City via Kingston, where it was transferred to ships plying the Hudson River.

High Falls would be important not only for its location at a key water crossing, spanned by a John A. Roebling aqueduct, and frequent layover on the canal, but for the natural cement discovered at nearby Rosendale during the canal's construction, which needed the millpower. As the canal remained in operation for the remainder of the century, it would transform the hamlet from an isolated rural community to a bustling, yet small, industrial town, especially after the canal was expanded in 1850 to handle bigger barges. In addition to the facilities built by the Delaware and Hudson Canal Company, such as a lock tender's house and general store, small stores and shops were built nearby to take advantage of the canal traffic. They and the hamlet's street and block layout still exist today, a testament to that period.

Development declined along with the canal's fortunes, and the district has changed little since the canal ceased operations in 1899, other than the state's relocation of the portion of Route 213 that goes through it in 1956. Its post-canal future began thirty years earlier. The road extending down from the Shawangunks had made High Falls a point of embarkation via carriage for canal or rail travelers destined for Mohonk Mountain House atop the ridge. This may have helped it establish itself as a vacation or weekend destination of its own, a reputation it still enjoys today. The nearby hills and fields and their mountain vistas are home to many second homes for residents of New York City and its downstate suburbs. The shops and stores are now boutiques and restaurants that cater to them on weekends and in summertime.

== Significant contributing properties ==
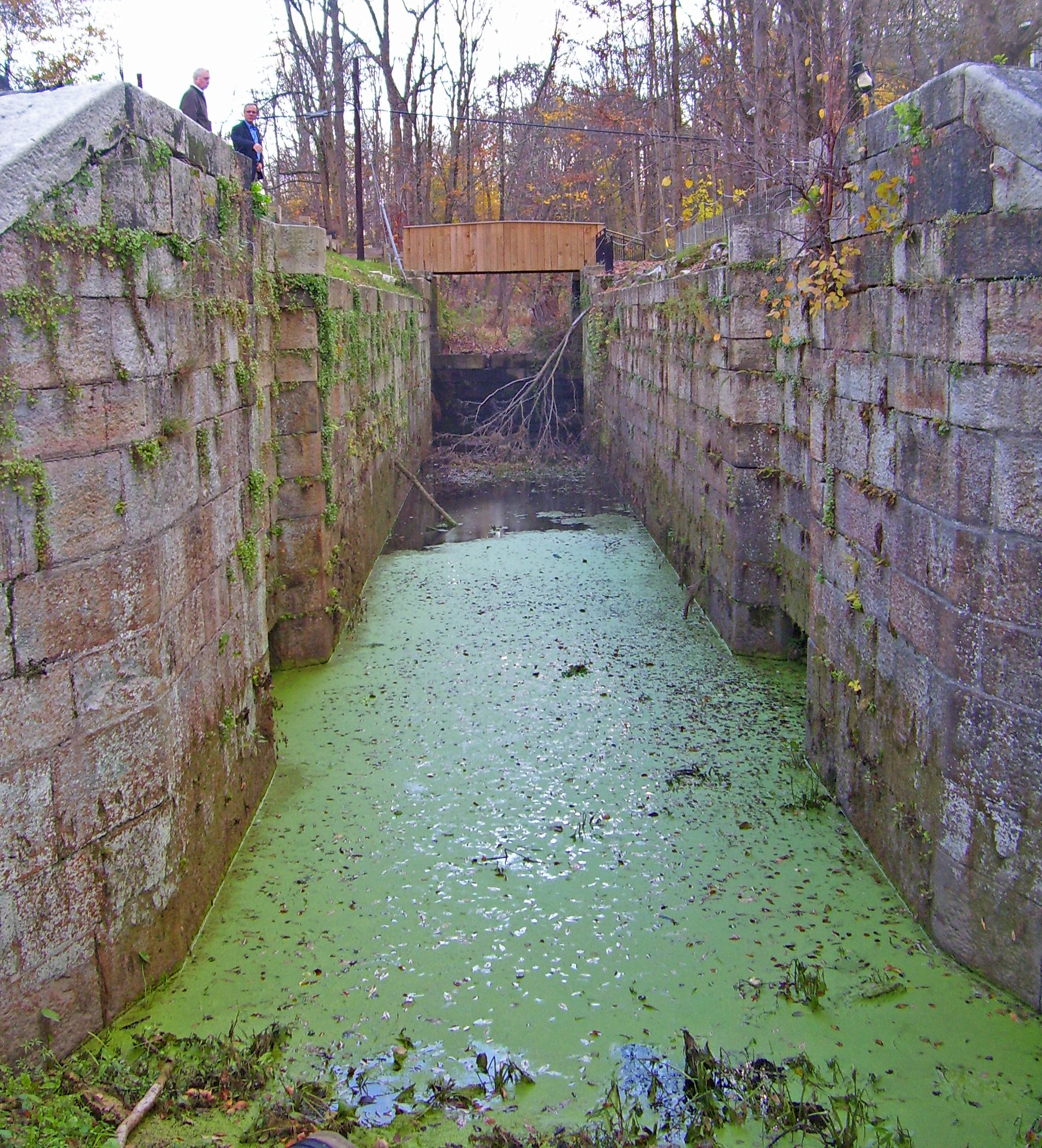
D& H Canal Lock No. 16

Three locks and two other structures from the canal are included in that property's National Historic Landmark designation. Several properties within the district are notable; none have yet been separately listed on the National Register.

- private residence, 23 Mohonk Road. Six years after its founding, the congregation built the St. John's Episcopal Memorial Chapel in the 1880s after a summer resident of the area donated the money.
- DePuy Tavern, 1315 Route 213. Home and tavern of early landowner built in 1797 and now one of the district's most recognizable landmarks. Home of the D&H Canal Historical Society. Will be the new D&H Canal Museum in 2022.
- DeGraff House, 1304 Route 213. This ornate brick Italianate home built in 1855 was later the home of a cement-works supervisor.
- Dutch Reformed Church Parsonage, 1300 Route 213. Greek Revival building dating to 1875. It is also now a restaurant.
- Hasbrouck Barn and Dwelling, 121–125 Main Street. This ornate Greek Revival residence, with stone wall, iron fence and carriage step, was built in the mid-19th century. Its English-style frame barn has been converted into a residence.
- I. Hasbrouck House and Store, 5-7 Second Street. This two-story frame building was constructed by the canal company as a feed store around 1850. Original storefronts remain on street level.
- High Falls Reformed Church, 4 Firehouse Road. An outgrowth of the congregation at nearby Alligerville put this two-story brick building up in 1867.
- J.B. Shaw House, 17 Mohonk Road. A brick house built in 1875 with some Greek Revival features. The property includes several outbuildings. Attached to the side is a building that housed the lock mechanism at nearby D&H Canal Lock 17 that predates it.
- I.H. Snyder Store, 1209 Route 213. Built around 1875, this two-story Italianate frame building with a hipped roof also has its original storefront.
- Temperance House, 1205 Route 213. The William Quick family operated this as the Cliff House from 1895–1949. A two-story open porch spans the five-bay facade
- Towpath House, 6-8 Second Street. After 1825 a structure was added onto this 1787 frame house, the oldest building in the district.

== See also ==
- National Register of Historic Places listings in Ulster County, New York
