= Woodridge, New York =

- Village
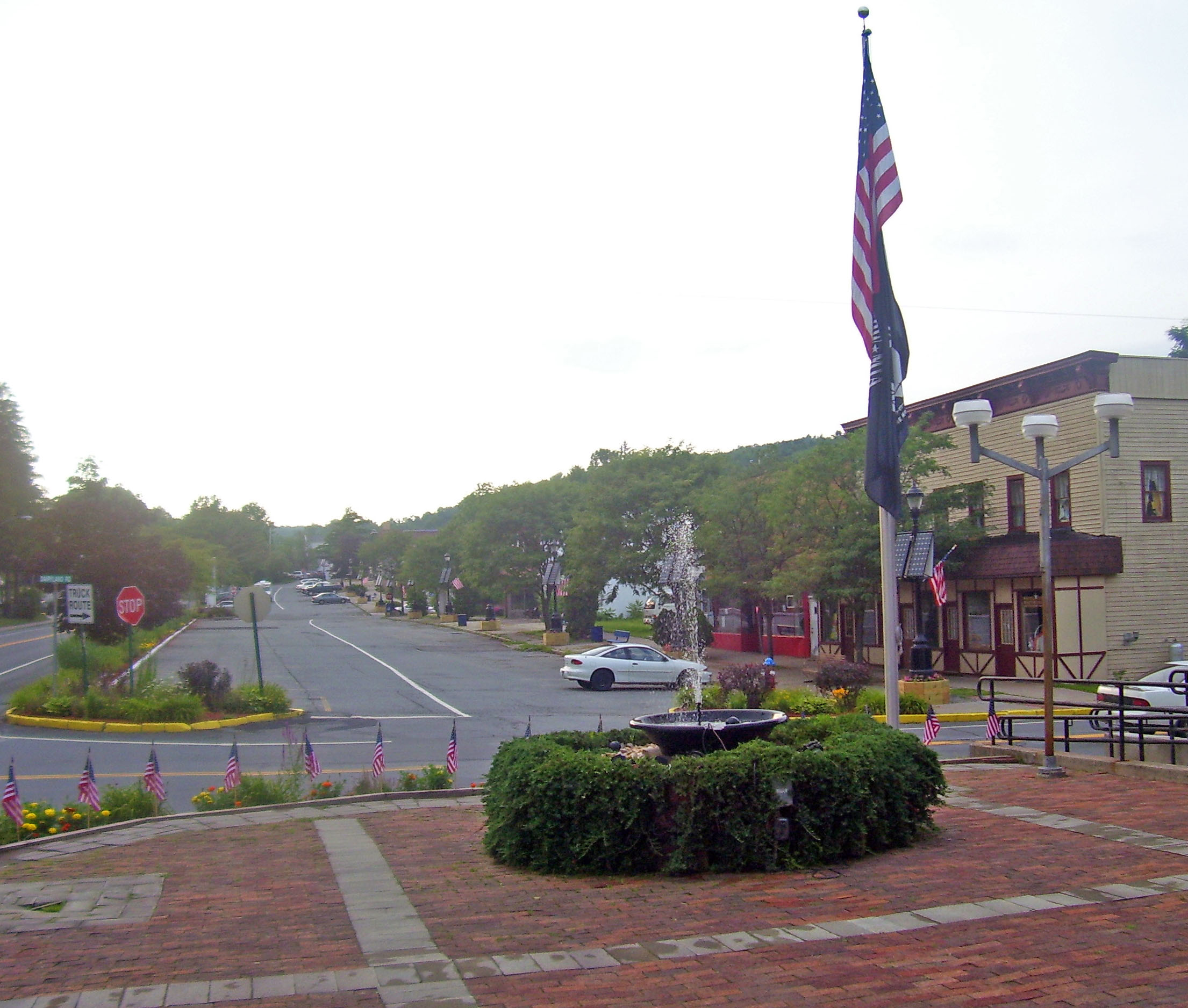
- Downtown Woodridge, from village hall plaza
- Etymology: Developed to make village more attractive for summer visitors
- Location of Woodridge in Sullivan County, New York

- Location of New York in the United States
- Coordinates: 41°42′34″N 74°34′17″W
- Country: United States
- State: New York
- County: Sullivan
- Founded: 1911, as Centerville

Government
  - Mayor: Joan Collins

Area
  - Total: 1.78 sq mi (4.60 km^{2})
  - Land: 1.68 sq mi (4.34 km^{2})
  - Water: 0.10 sq mi (0.26 km^{2})
- Elevation: 1,120 ft (340 m)
- Highest elevation (N boundary near NW corner): 1,420 ft (430 m)
- Lowest elevation: 1,060 ft (320 m)

Population (2020)
  - Total: 747
  - Density: 446.3/sq mi (172.31/km^{2})
- Time zone: UTC-5 (Eastern (EST))
  - Summer (DST): UTC-4 (EDT)
- ZIP Code: 12789
- Area code: 845
- FIPS code: 36-82953
- Website: https://www.woodridgeny.net/

Woodridge is a village in Sullivan County, New York, United States. The population was 747 at the 2020 census. The village is in the town of Fallsburg at the junction of county routes 53, 54, 58, and 158. The Woodridge ZIP Code is 12789.

== History ==
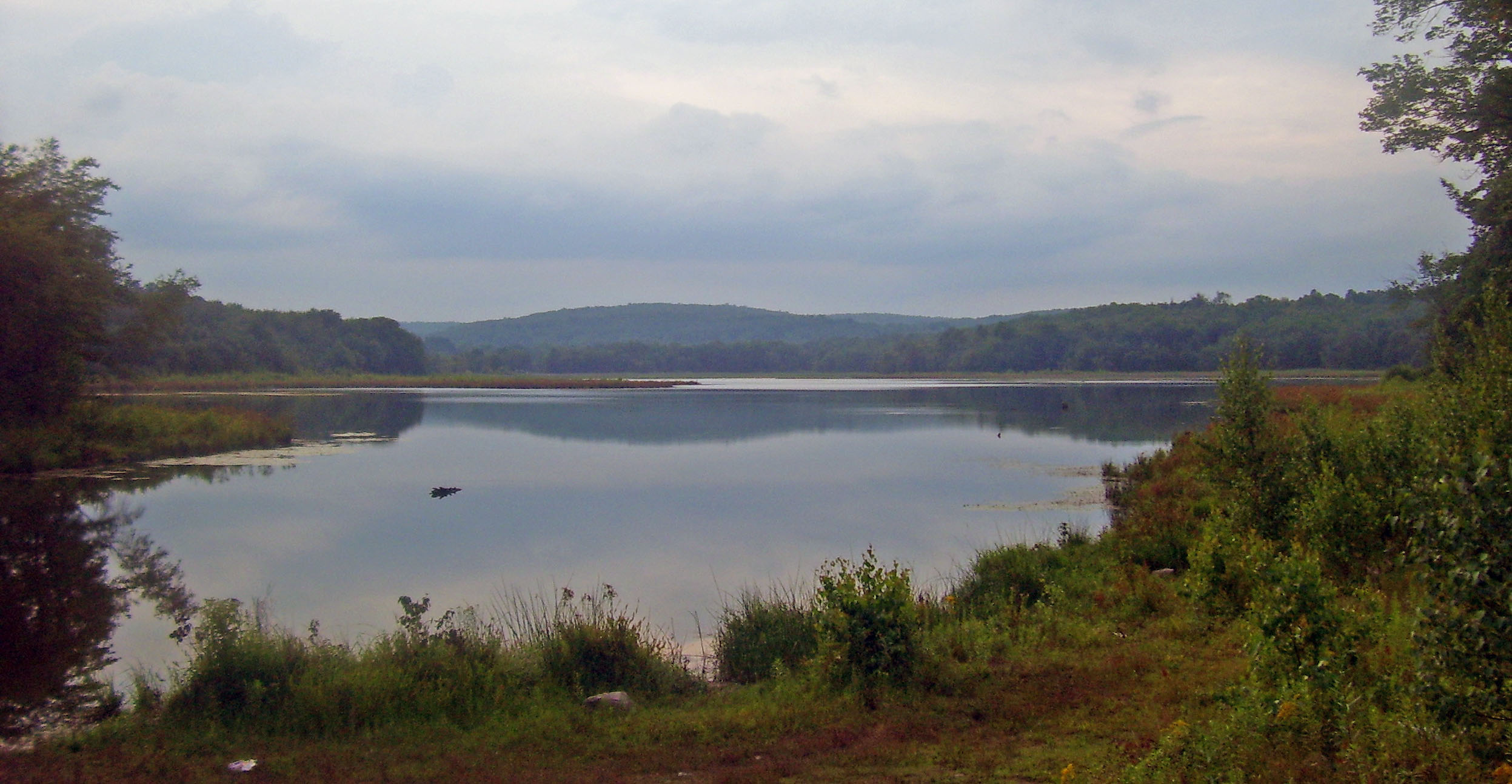
Silver Lake, Woodridge, New York, in the Catskill Mountains

The village was formerly called "Centreville". A history of the village, Centreville to Woodridge by Erna W. Elliott, was published by Exposition Press in 1976. Centreville was a station stop along the old New York, Ontario and Western Railway.

Woodridge is located in the Catskills Borscht Belt resort area. In its heyday it was home to numerous summer hotels, bungalow colonies, and boarding houses. Fallsburgh Central School's high school was in Woodridge. The last graduating class was in 1958. The new high school was built in Fallsburg.

During the 1950s, Woodridge had:

- 4 bars
- 3 hardware stores
- 2 dental offices
- 1 amusement business
- 6 gasoline stations
- 3 produce markets
- 2 bus lines
- 5 automobile repair shops
- 5 groceries
- 1 fish market
- 2 taxi services
- 2 dry cleaners
- 4 luncheonettes
- 2 drug stores
- 1 bank
- 1 movie theatre
- 3 clothing stores
- 1 liquor store
- 1 shoe store
- 1 steam laundry
- 2 barber shops
- 3 automobile dealerships
- 1 mattress manufacturer
- 3 butcher shops
- 2 medical doctor's offices
- 3 lumber yards

1- bakery- Mortmans

In addition, there were numerous trades and professionals, including painters, a plumber, electricians, masons, carpenters, auto body repair, CPAs, architects, lawyers, flooring contractors, sign painters and chicken dealers.

A small percentage of the permanent population is still Orthodox Jewish. There are two active synagogues in Woodridge:

- Ohave Shalom Synagogue was listed on the National Register of Historic Places in 2000.
- K'hal Yerim of Woodridge on 25 Highland Avenue was founded in 1985 by the Grand Rabbi Yitzchok Lebovits.

Silver Lake Dam was listed on the National Register of Historic Places in 2000.

=== Notable former hotels in Woodridge ===
- Olympic Hotel
- Avon Lodge
- Glory Hotel
- Hotel Israel (Fischel Kleinberg's)
- Lake House
- Vegetarian Hotel (Konviser family)
- The Biltmore
- Sunny Oaks
- The Claremore Country Club
- Sunny Acres Dude Ranch
- The Rosemond
- The Alamac Country Club
- Rubinstein's Hotel
- Saperstein's Bungalow's
- Hotel Weingerson
- Shein's Hotel
- Wagon Wheel

== Government ==
- Village Mayor David Schlesinger (David Schlesinger was appointed mayor after the death of Mayor Joan Collins on October 19, 2025)
- Village Trustees – Yoranda Sanabria, Yitzchok Wertzberger, Ceila Avadyaev and Carl Lomnitz
- Judges – David Maho, Bart Rasnick (Acting)
- Village Clerk – Gloria Sanders
- Village Treasurer – Valerie Brown
- Village Attorney – Jeffrey Kaplan
- Health Officer – Mayer Rosenberg
- Registrar of Vital Statistics – Gloria Sanders
- Deputy Registrars of Vital Statistics – Valerie Brown
- Emergency/Disaster Liaison – Thomas Decker
- Community Liaison – David Schlesinger
- Village Engineer – William Illing
- Village Planner – Tom Shepstone
- Building Inspector – Jim Gerrard
- Building & Zoning Advisor – Todd Maurizzio

== Geography ==
Woodridge is located at 41°42′29″N 74°34′11″W (41.708062, -74.569809). Woodridge is bordered by the Hamlet of Fallsburg or Old Falls, the Hamlet of Mountaindale, and the Hamlet of Glen Wild.

According to the United States Census Bureau, the village has a total area of 1.6 square miles (4.1 km^{2}), of which 1.5 square miles (3.9 km^{2}) is land and 0.1 square miles (0.26 km^{2}) (6.10%) is water.

== Demographics ==
Historical population
Census	Pop.	Note	%±
1920	944		—
1930	774		−18.0%
1940	854		10.3%
1950	951		11.4%
1960	1,034		8.7%
1970	1,071		3.6%
1980	809		−24.5%
1990	783		−3.2%
2000	902		15.2%
2010	847		−6.1%
2020	747		−11.8%
U.S. Decennial Census

As of the census of 2000, there were 902 people, 351 households, and 228 families residing in the village. The population density was 583.9 inhabitants per square mile (225.4/km^{2}). There were 473 housing units at an average density of 306.2 per square mile (118.2/km^{2}). The racial makeup of the village was 72.84% White, 12.42% African American, 0.22% Native American, 1.00% Asian, 0.22% Pacific Islander, 8.98% from other races, and 4.32% from two or more races. Hispanic or Latino of any race were 23.61% of the population.

There were 351 households, out of which 33.3% had children under the age of 18 living with them, 41.0% were married couples living together, 16.2% had a female householder with no husband present, and 35.0% were non-families. 30.8% of all households were made up of individuals, and 15.1% had someone living alone who was 65 years of age or older. The average household size was 2.50 and the average family size was 3.10.

In the village, the population was spread out, with 27.3% under the age of 18, 7.1% from 18 to 24, 25.3% from 25 to 44, 22.4% from 45 to 64, and 18.0% who were 65 years of age or older. The median age was 39 years. For every 100 females, there were 89.9 males. For every 100 females age 18 and over, there were 86.9 males.

The median income for a household in the village was $23,750, and the median income for a family was $29,167. Males had a median income of $30,357 versus $25,694 for females. The per capita income for the village was $14,993. About 25.4% of families and 31.1% of the population were below the poverty line, including 40.9% of those under age 18 and 24.4% of those age 65 or over.
