= High Falls, New York =

- CDP
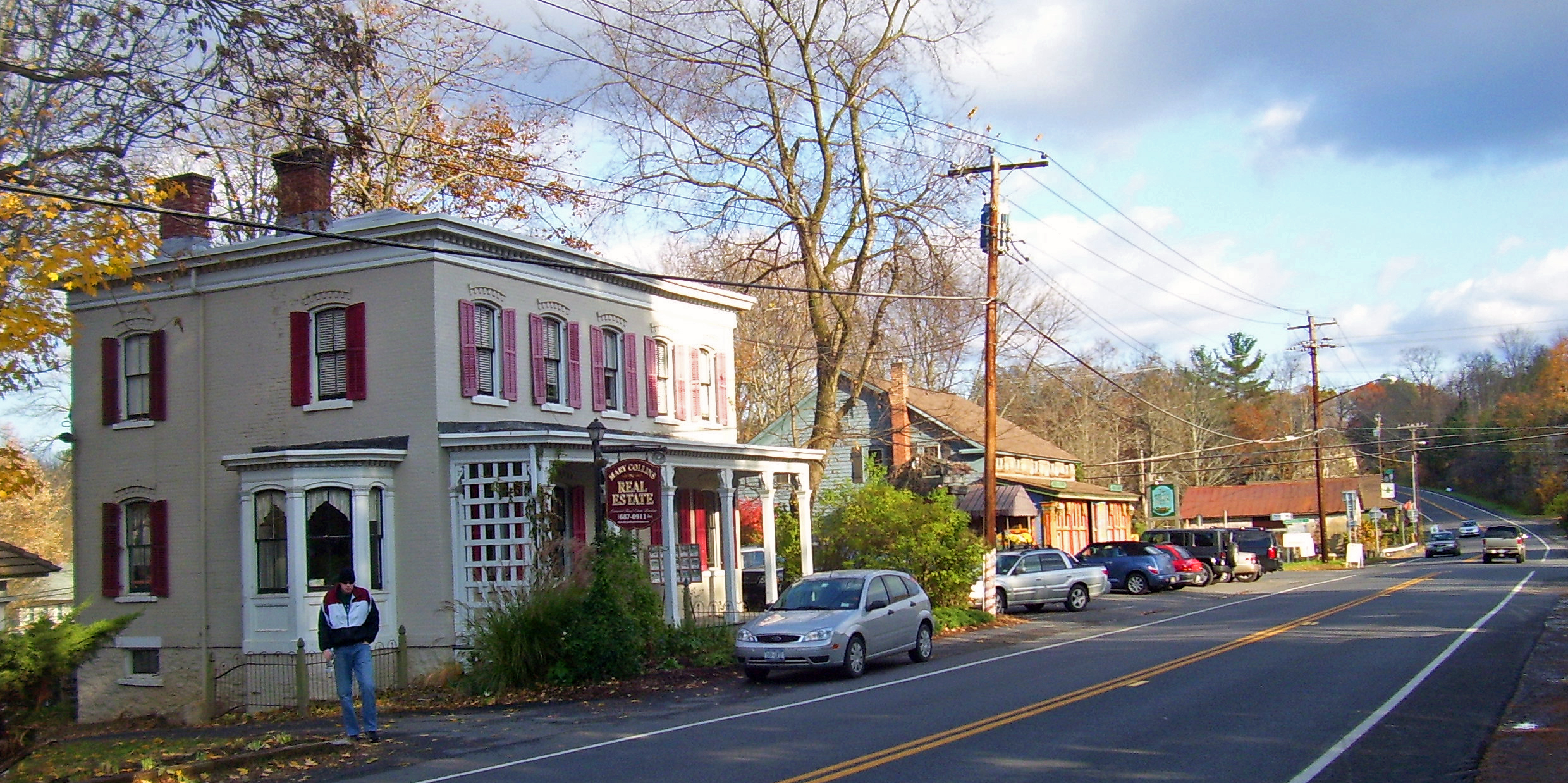
- Buildings in the High Falls Historic District

- Location in Ulster County and the state of New York.
- Coordinates: 41°49′37″N 74°7′20″W
- Country: United States
- State: New York
- County: Ulster

Area
  - Total: 1.69 sq mi (4.38 km^{2})
  - Land: 1.69 sq mi (4.38 km^{2})
  - Water: 0 sq mi (0.00 km^{2})
- Elevation: 161 ft (49 m)

Population (2020)
  - Total: 700
  - Density: 414.3/sq mi (159.97/km^{2})
- Time zone: UTC−5 (EST)
  - Summer (DST): UTC−4 (EDT)
- ZIP Code: 12440
- Area code: 845
- FIPS code: 36-34451
- GNIS feature ID: 0952733

High Falls is a hamlet (and census-designated place) in Ulster County, New York, United States. The population was 700 at the 2020 census.

Portions of High Falls are located in the towns of Marbletown and Rosendale.

== History ==
The High Falls Historic District and Lock Tender's House and Canal Store Ruin are listed on the National Register of Historic Places.

High Falls takes its name from the nearby feature on Rondout Creek, where the creek cuts through a large rock formation and goes over a large waterfall. It was an attractive source of water power, and millers were drawn to it from colonial times. The first bridge to nearby Stone Ridge, on the main road through the valley between the Shawangunks and Catskills, was built during this time. The stone Jacob DePuy House, from 1797 (expanded in mid-19th century), reflects this era and retains much of its original fabric.

A large stone house with a large American flag draped across its upper right story behind an evergreen tree. In front of it is a blue and gold historical marker on the Jacob DePuy house. In the early 19th century, a cotton and woolen factory in the hamlet made it a center of local manufacturing, serving many of the farms in the surrounding area. This set the stage for the construction and opening of the canal in 1828. The D & H was built to transport anthracite coal from Northeastern Pennsylvania to New York City via Kingston, where it was transferred to ships plying the Hudson River.

High Falls would be important not only for its location at a key water crossing, spanned by a John A. Roebling aqueduct, and frequent layover on the canal, but for the natural cement discovered at nearby Rosendale during the canal's construction, which needed the millpower. As the canal remained in operation for the remainder of the century, it would transform the hamlet from an isolated rural community to a bustling, yet small, industrial town, especially after the canal was expanded in 1850 to handle bigger barges. In addition to the facilities built by the Delaware and Hudson Canal Company, such as a lock tender's house and general store, small stores and shops were built nearby to take advantage of the canal traffic. They and the hamlet's street and block layout still exist today, a testament to that period.

Development declined along with the canal's fortunes, and the district has changed little since the canal ceased operations in 1899, other than the state's relocation of the portion of New York Route 213 that goes through it in 1956. Its post-canal future began thirty years earlier. The road extending down from the Shawangunks had made High Falls a point of embarkation via carriage for canal or rail travelers destined for Mohonk Mountain House atop the ridge. This may have helped it establish itself as a vacation or weekend destination of its own, a reputation it still enjoys today. The nearby hills and fields and their mountain vistas are home to many second homes for residents of New York City and its downstate suburbs. The shops and stores are now boutiques and restaurants that cater to them on weekends and in summertime.

== Geography ==
High Falls is located at 41°49′37″N 74°7′20″W (41.826892, -74.122151).

According to the United States Census Bureau, the CDP has a total area of 1.2 square miles (3.1 km^{2}), all land.

== Demographics ==
Historical population
Census	Pop.	Note	%±
2000	627		—
2010	627		0.0%
2020	700		11.6%
U.S. Decennial Census

At the 2000 census there were 627 people, 271 households, and 169 families in the CDP. The population density was 524.4 inhabitants per square mile (202.5/km^{2}). There were 301 housing units at an average density of 251.7 per square mile (97.2/km^{2}). The racial makeup of the CDP was 94.90% White, 2.71% African American, 0.32% Asian, 0.96% from other races, and 1.12% from two or more races. Hispanic or Latino of any race were 3.83%.

Of the 271 households 26.6% had children under the age of 18 living with them, 48.3% were married couples living together, 10.7% had a female householder with no husband present, and 37.3% were non-families. 33.6% of households were one person and 10.7% were one person aged 65 or older. The average household size was 2.31 and the average family size was 2.98.

The age distribution was 22.5% under the age of 18, 5.9% from 18 to 24, 27.1% from 25 to 44, 30.9% from 45 to 64, and 13.6% 65 or older. The median age was 43 years. For every 100 females, there were 90.0 males. For every 100 females age 18 and over, there were 84.8 males.

The median household income was $35,735 and the median family income was $52,895. Males had a median income of $31,339 versus $27,500 for females. The per capita income for the CDP was $18,781. About 12.1% of families and 8.4% of the population were below the poverty line, including 11.0% of those under age 18 and 7.7% of those age 65 or over.

== Education ==
The CDP is in Rondout Valley Central School District.

== Popular culture ==
The 1987 Teenage Mutant Ninja Turtles TV series season 4 episode "Unidentified Flying Leonardo" is set in High Falls.

Part of the 1961 movie Splendor in the Grass starring Natalie Wood and Warren Beatty was filmed at the waterfalls in the hamlet.

Brennan Lee Mulligan, gamemaster of popular online TTRPG show Dimension 20, spent the majority of his childhood in this town.
