= West Strand Historic District =

National historic district at Kingston, Ulster County, New York

- U.S. National Register of Historic Places
- U.S. Historic district
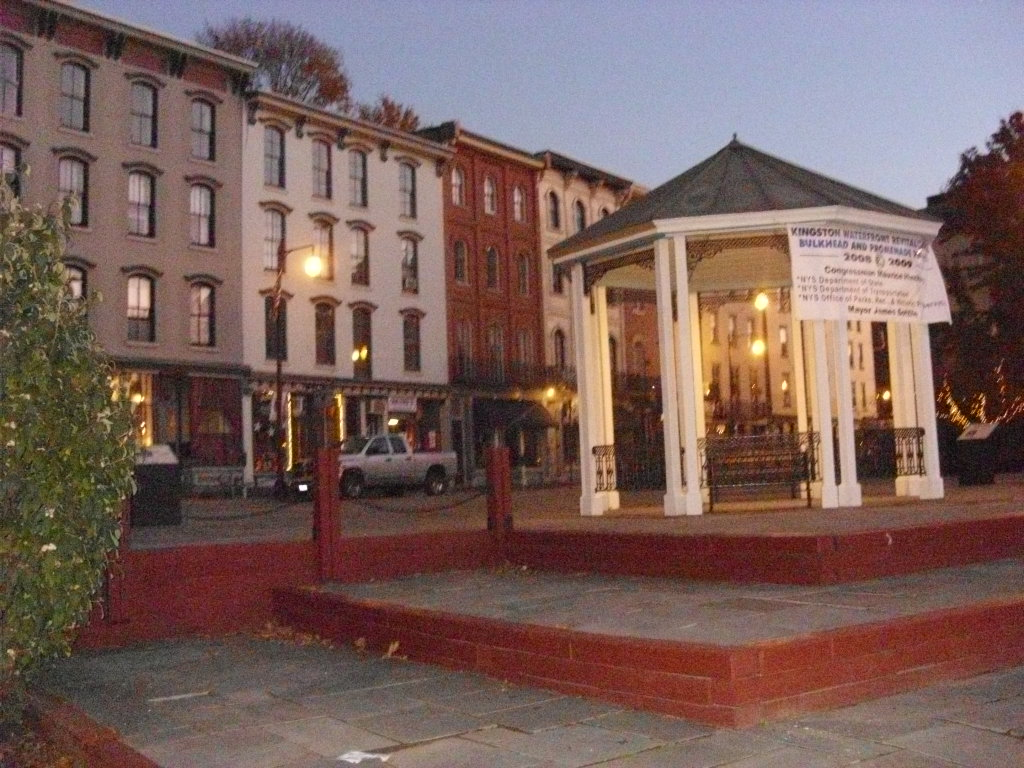
- Mariner's Harbor - Kingston, New York

- Location within New York Location within the United States
- Location: West Strand and Broadway, Kingston, New York
- Coordinates: 41°55′4″N 73°59′1″W
- Area: 2 acres (0.81 ha)
- Architect: Multiple
- NRHP reference No.: 74001314
- Added to NRHP: June 28, 1974

West Strand Historic District is a national historic district located at Kingston in Ulster County, New York. The district includes nine contributing buildings. It comprises a grouping of 19th century commercial buildings. They are four story buildings generally constructed of brick with storefronts on the first floor.

It was listed on the National Register of Historic Places in 1974. It is located adjacent to the Rondout-West Strand Historic District, listed on the National Register of Historic Places in 1979.
