= Wallkill Valley Rail Trail =

Rail trail in New York, United States

Coordinates: 41°44′11″N 74°05′50″W

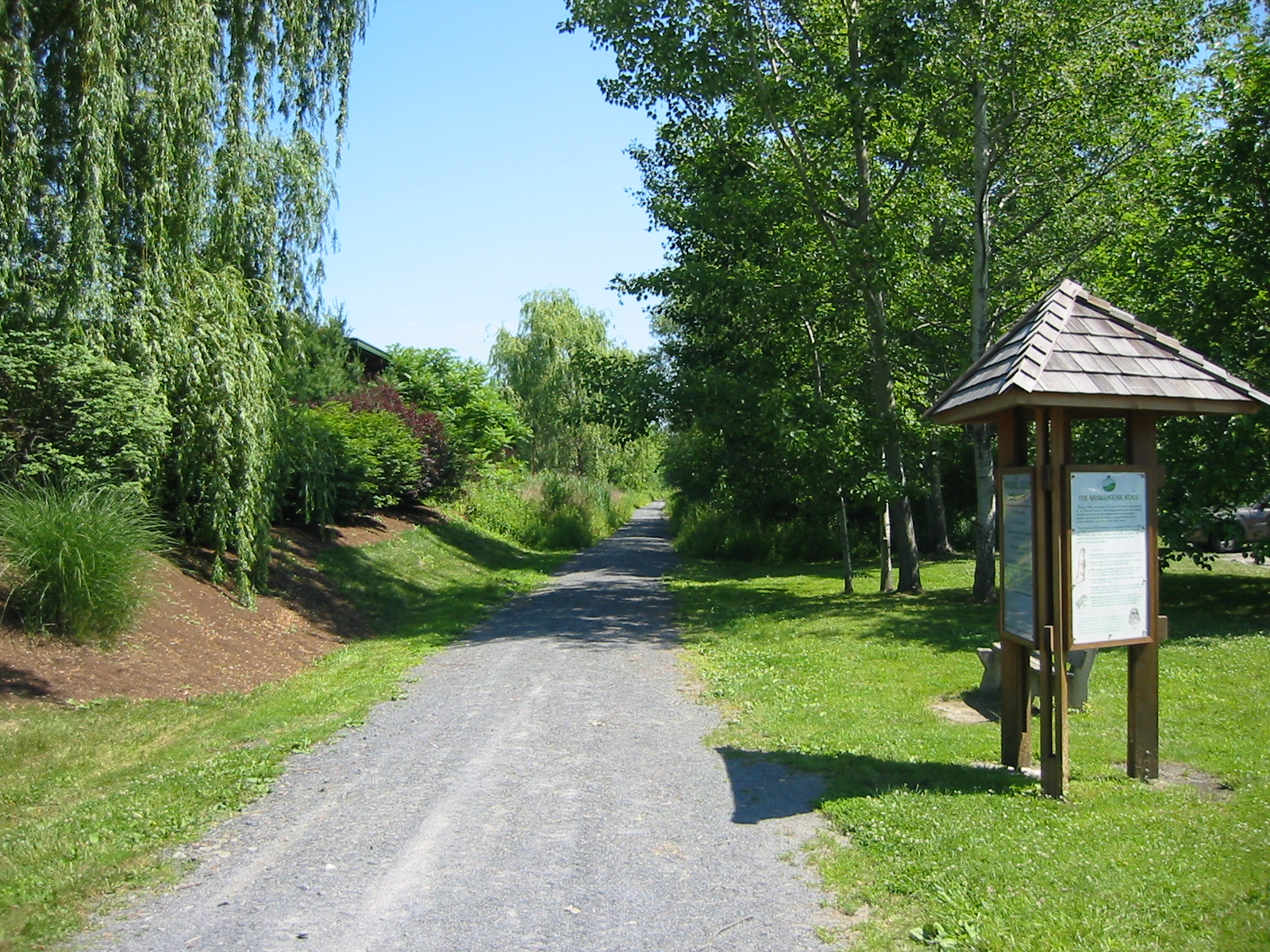
- The trail in Gardiner where it crosses Route 44/55
- Length: 23.7 miles (38.1 km)
- Location: Ulster County, New York
- Designation: National Recreation Trail, 2007
- Trailheads: Gardiner; New Paltz; Rosendale; Kingston
- Use: Hiking, jogging, bike riding, horseback riding, and cross-country skiing
- Sights: Shawangunk Ridge; Rondout Creek; Wallkill River; Rosendale trestle
- Website: Wallkill Valley Land Trust

The Wallkill Valley Rail Trail is a 23.7-mile (38.1 km) rail trail and linear park that runs along the former Wallkill Valley Railroad rail corridor in Ulster County, New York, United States. It stretches from Gardiner through New Paltz, Rosendale and Ulster to the Kingston city line, just south of a demolished, concrete Conrail railroad bridge that was located on a team-track siding several blocks south of the also-demolished Kingston New York Central Railroad passenger station. The trail is separated from the Walden–Wallkill Rail Trail by two state prisons in Shawangunk, though there have been plans to bypass these facilities and to connect the Wallkill Valley Rail Trail with other regional rail-trails. The northern section of the trail forms part of the Empire State Trail.

Plans to create the rail trail began as early as 1983, when New Paltz considered uses for the then-defunct Wallkill Valley rail corridor; the railroad had ceased regular traffic in 1977 and, by 1983, had begun to remove its tracks. In 1991, a local land trust, the Wallkill Valley Land Trust, purchased the 12-mile (19 km) section of the former rail corridor between New Paltz and Gardiner, and conveyed the New Paltz section to the town and village of New Paltz with permanent land protection agreements, held by the Wallkill Valley Land Trust. The trail was formally opened between New Paltz and Gardiner in 1993, though Gardiner did not purchase its section from the Wallkill Valley Land Trust until 2007: again, with a land protection agreement placed on it. The length of the trail was effectively doubled by an Ulster County unpaid-tax foreclosure land seizure, in 2009. The Wallkill Valley Land Trust, in partnership with Open Space Institute, acquired the additional property from Ulster County and began several capital campaigns to open-up public access. The extension included the Rosendale trestle, a 940-foot (290 m) bridge across Rondout Creek. There are several other bridges that carry the trail, though none are as long.

The trail serves hikers, joggers, bikers, horseback riders and cross-country skiers. It passes through several historic districts, such as Huguenot Street in New Paltz, and the Binnewater Historic District and Snyder Estate in Rosendale. The trail also traverses U.S. Route 44 (concurrent with State Route 55), and state routes 299 and 213. Several natural features are visible from clear points along the trail, such as the Shawangunk Ridge to the west and the Plattekill Creek between New Paltz and Gardiner. The trail passes through dense vegetation, and is frequented by many types of animals and overwintering birds.

== History ==
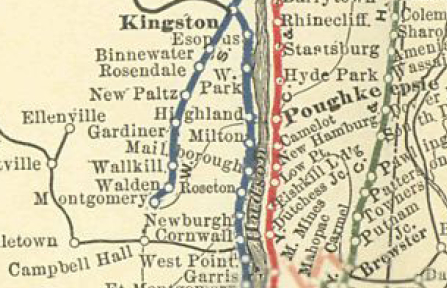
The original Wallkill Valley rail line, stretching from Montgomery to Kingston

Stretching 33 miles (53 km) from Montgomery to Kingston, the Wallkill Valley Railroad operated from 1866 until its last regular freight run on December 31, 1977. During the 1980s, its owner, Conrail, began to salvage the former corridor's steel rails and sell-off sections of the rail bed. State law mandated that, in such sales, offers must be made first to the state; then to the involved counties and municipalities. The state bought a 1.4-mile (2.3 km) portion of rail bed between Shawangunk and Gardiner in November 1985, for the construction of the Shawangunk Correctional Facility in the hamlet of Wallkill.

While Montgomery and Shawangunk purchased their sections of the railroad – 2.0 and 2.3 miles (3.2 and 3.7 km), respectively – in 1985, eventually creating the 3.22-mile (5.18 km) Walden–Wallkill Rail Trail, the towns of New Paltz, Gardiner and Rosendale initially declined to purchase their sections of the rail line. The town of Shawangunk has been evaluating plans to bypass the state prison to connect the Walden–Wallkill and Wallkill Valley trails since 2004, and such a connection was listed as a project in a 2008 county-wide transportation plan. The latest proposal involves diverting the trail along Birch Road. The Wallkill Valley Rail Trail was the seventeenth rail trail created in New York state, and became a National Recreation Trail in 2007.

=== New Paltz and Gardiner ===
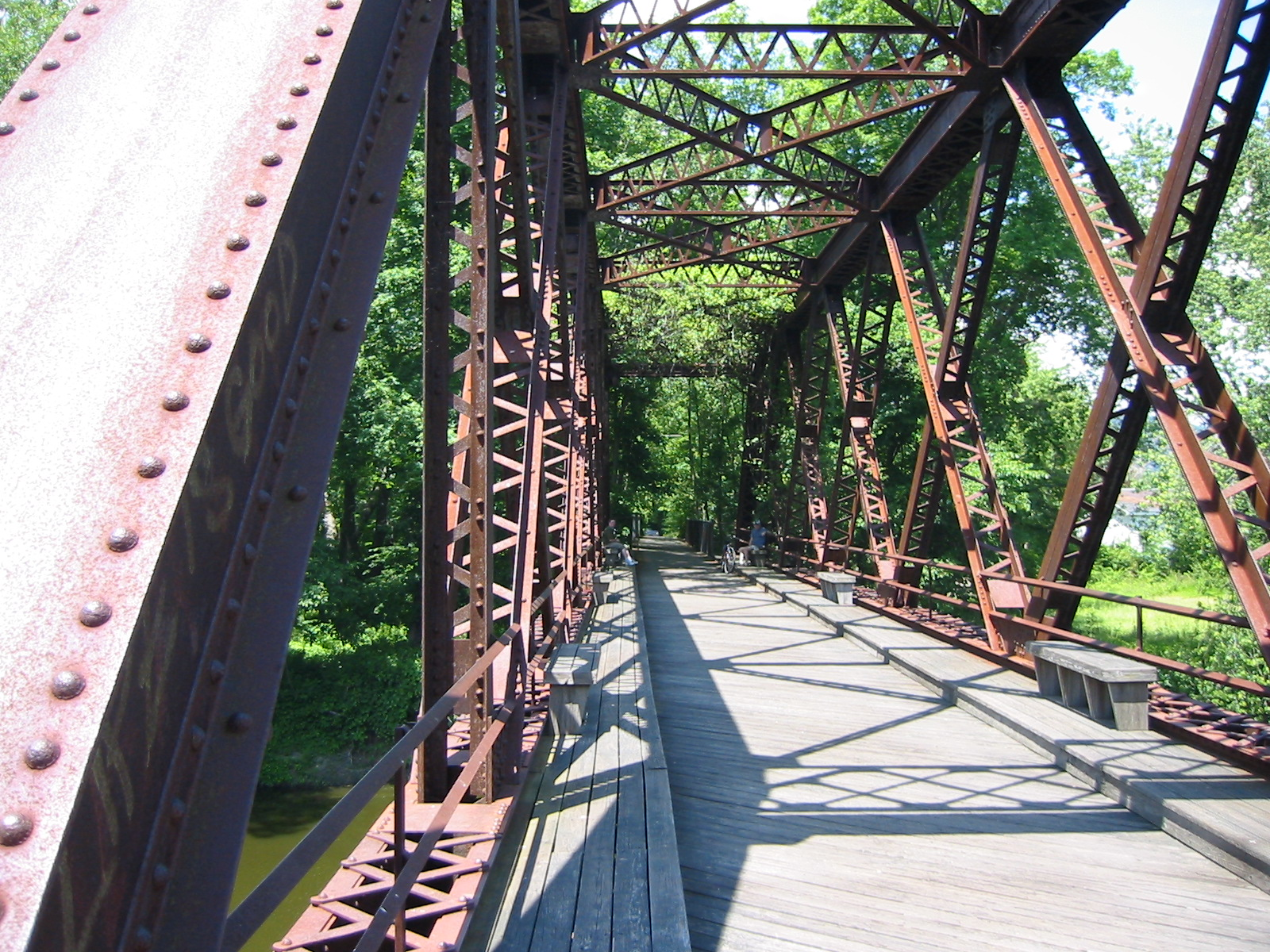
The Springtown Truss Bridge that carries the trail over the Wallkill River. A key scene from the 2018 movie "A Quiet Place" was filmed here.

Converting the former corridor to a rail trail was first considered in a 1983 environmental report commissioned by the town of New Paltz. The study considered repurposing the corridor as a road for cars, but determined that the right-of-way, "lend[ing] itself to multiple and simultaneous 'people-oriented' transit", was "ideally suited for use as a trail for hiking, strolling, running, cycling and cross-country skiing". In 1988, New Paltz invited a local non-profit, the Wallkill Valley Land Trust, to acquire the portion of the rail line between New Paltz and Gardiner. The Wallkill Valley Land Trust in turn requested assistance from The Trust for Public Land, and the purchase was completed on January 18, 1991.

While the town and village of New Paltz immediately purchased their sections from the Wallkill Valley Land Trust, with conservation easements on them – roughly 4 and 3 miles (6.4 and 4.8 km), respectively – Gardiner did not purchase its 6-mile (9.7 km) section until much later; again, at that time, the Wallkill Valley Land Trust stewards held the conservation easements. Portions of the New Paltz–Gardiner section were informally open since June, 1991, but the formal opening ceremony of the full 12.2-mile (19.6 km) trail between New Paltz and Gardiner took place on October 9, 1993.

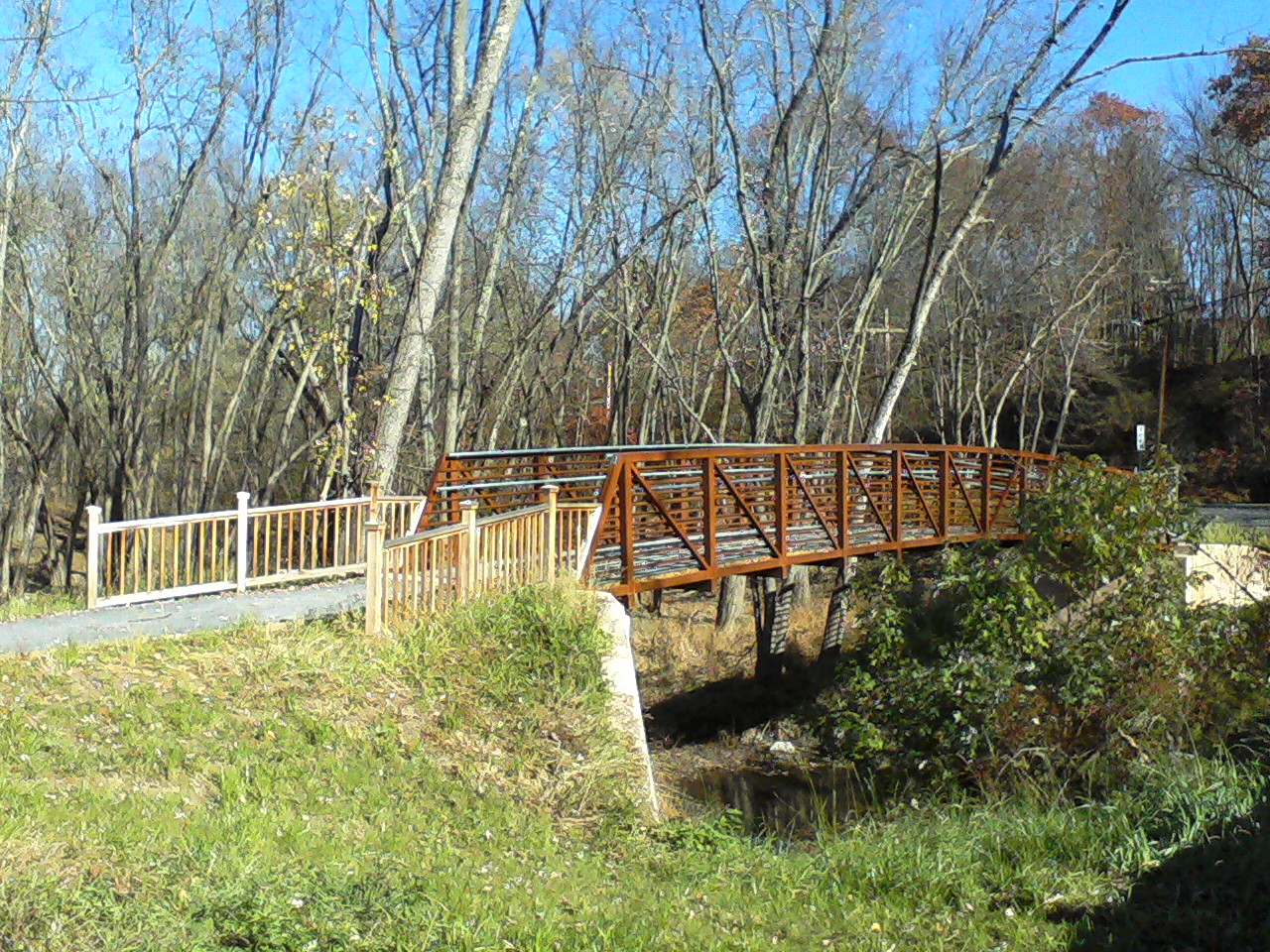
A footbridge connecting the parking area of the Sojourner Truth park with the trail

The Gardiner section was in such a state of disrepair in 2004 that the Wallkill Valley Land Trust almost closed it. Gardiner received a $100,000 grant from the New York State Office of Parks, Recreation and Historic Preservation in December 2006, and the purchase was completed in 2007. The state provided an additional $5,000 to maintain the trail.

Purchasing the section allowed Gardiner to fix the drainage problems that had deteriorated the surface of the trail and to ban the use of motor vehicles. Though the section was worth $307,300, the Wallkill Valley Land Trust sold it to Gardiner for $70,000.

In 2009 and 2010, the Tea Party movement held protests along the Gardiner section of the trail. In November 2009, New Paltz received grants from the Greenway Conservancy, a state organization, to fund several rail trail–related projects. This included $17,750 to create a link between the New Paltz section of the trail and the Hudson Valley Rail Trail in nearby Lloyd, which was in turn being extended eastward to the Poughkeepsie Bridge; the connection with the bridge was completed in October 2010. The Wallkill Valley Railroad had considered such a connection after the bridge opened in 1889, but never built one. The grants also included $7,000 to create 400 feet (120 m) of ADA-accessible trail, to connect the parking area of a local park, named after Sojourner Truth, with the rail trail. The town had intended to connect the parking area with the trail since the late 1990s, but concerns over traffic, as well as state requirements, had added to the time and cost of the path; it was completed by June, 2010. The connections are part of a county-wide plan to create a bicycle path along NY 299, to link regional rail trails.

=== Rosendale ===
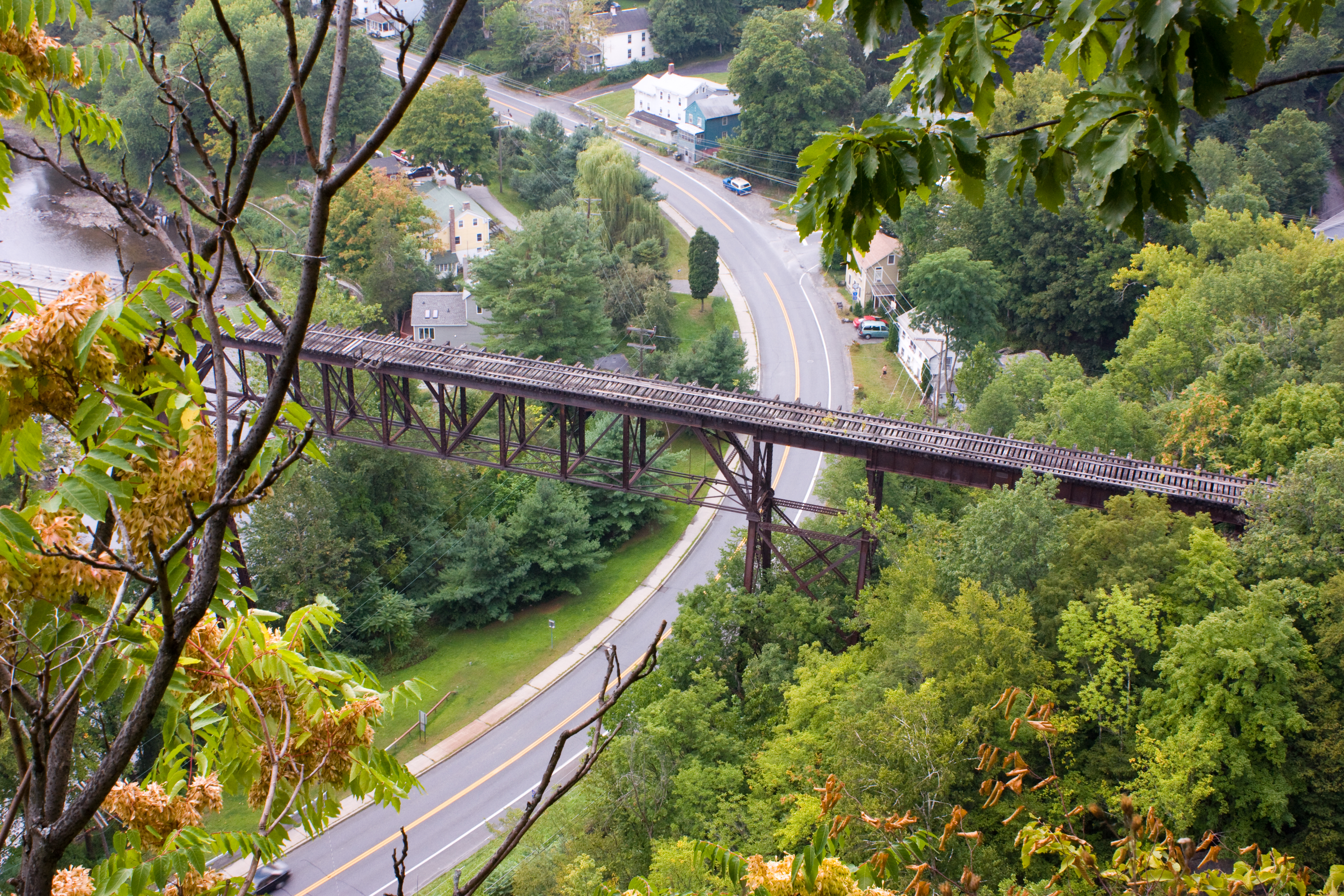
The northern half of the Rosendale trestle in 2008, without decking or guard rails

The Rosendale portion of the rail bed runs 11.5 miles (18.5 km) from Rosendale through Ulster to Kingston and contains the 940-foot-long (290 m) Rosendale trestle. The trestle rises 150 feet (46 m) above Rondout Creek and State Route 213, and also spans the former Delaware and Hudson Canal. At the time of its construction it was the highest span bridge in the United States.

Conrail sold the Rosendale section, including the bridge, in 1986 to a private area businessman, John E. Rahl, for one dollar. Rahl maintained that the purchase granted him the right to "restore rail service on the whole Wallkill line", and to joint ownership of Conrail. Between 1989 and 1991, Rahl installed planking and guard rails on the southern half of the bridge, which was then opened to the public. He intended to allow bungee jumping off the bridge, and did so until a January, 1992 court order held that it violated zoning laws. Douglas Hase, an entrepreneur who had run both bungee jumping and hot air ballooning companies, tried unsuccessfully in 2003 and 2004 to get a variance for such a venture.

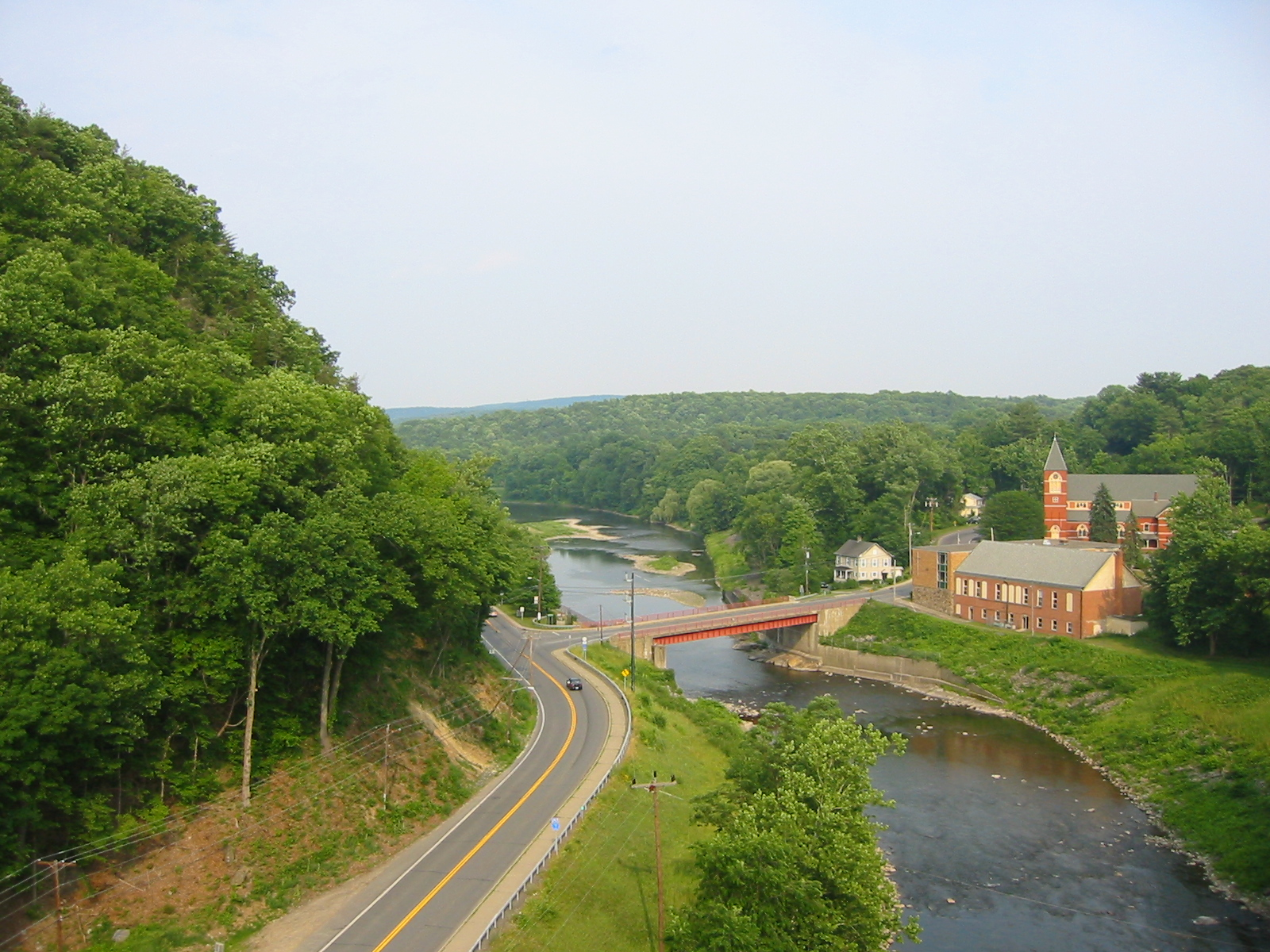
View of the Rondout Creek and State Route 213 from the Rosendale trestle

After Rahl failed to pay $13,716 in property taxes over a period of three years, Ulster County foreclosed on the 63.34-acre (25.63 ha) property on April 15, 2009. The Wallkill Valley Land Trust and Open Space Institute placed a bid on the land parcels comprising the Rosendale section on April 22, 2009, and agreed to pay all outstanding taxes before receiving full ownership on July 8, 2009, with the intention of adding it to the Wallkill Valley Rail Trail. Following an engineering survey, the bridge was closed to the public in June 2009, for repairs. Renovations were completed in 2013, allowing for the bridge to be opened to the public.

Canopy Development, a green development company from Northampton, Massachusetts, owns a portion of the former rail bed in Rosendale. It has agreed to establish a right-of-way, rerouting the trail to allow public access. Another obstruction between Rosendale and Ulster is a private swimming pool, which will be bypassed. The Mohonk Preserve and Open Space Conservancy were given a $20,000 state grant in March 2011, to maintain the portion of the trail by Kingston. By the end of summer, 2013, the last outstanding trail segment along the Rosendale-Kingston extension was opened to the public, completing the entire 23.7-mile rail trail.

A regional business association has proposed a link between the trail, in Rosendale, and a series of regional rail trails. The proposal would create a 35-mile (56 km) network of rail trails across the towns of Marbletown, Rochester, and Wawarsing. Several involved towns have been working toward accomplishing such a connection.

== Route ==
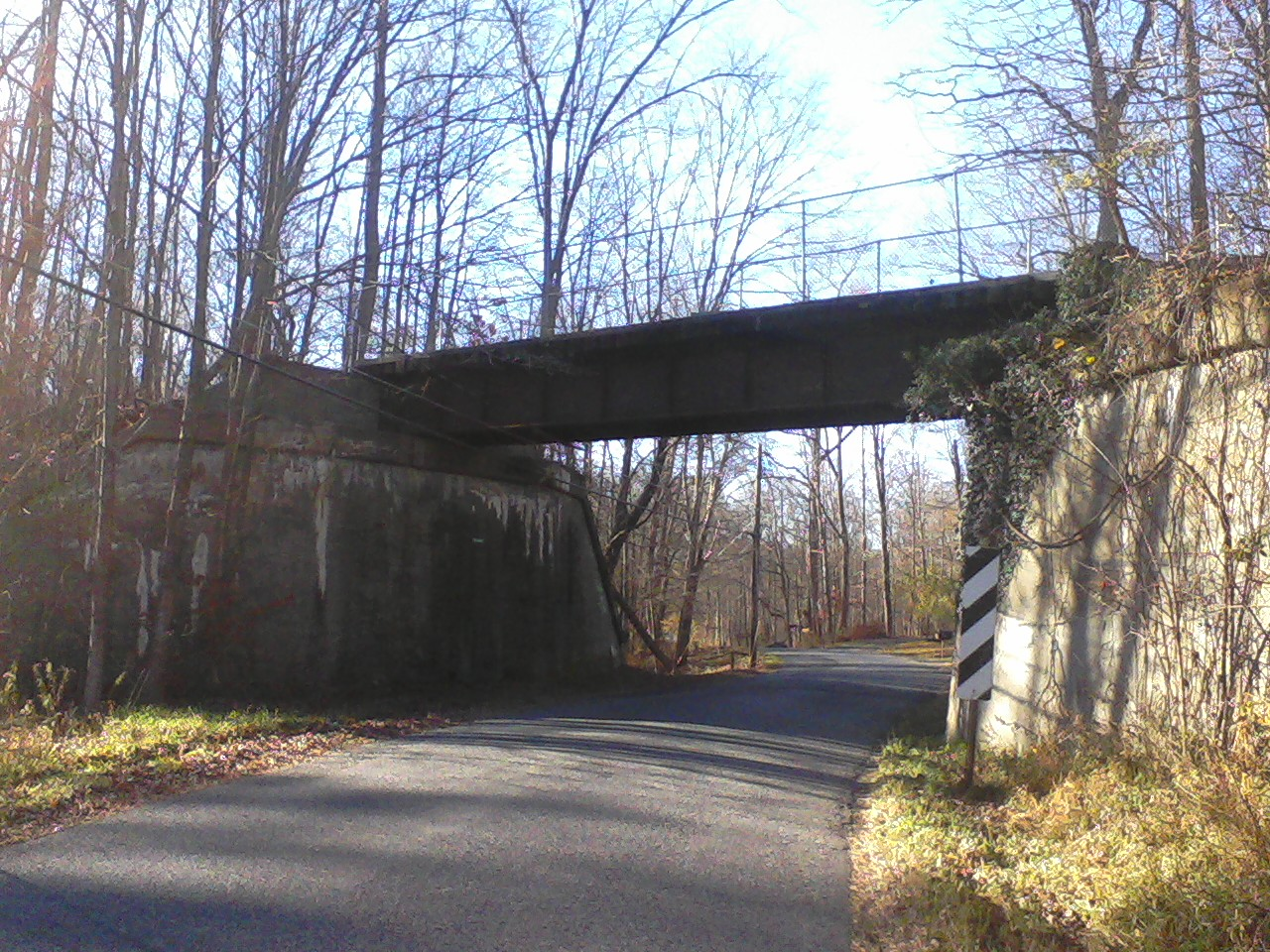
An overpass carrying the trail over Forest Glen Road in Gardiner

The trail begins at Denniston Road, in the southern part of the town of Gardiner. Movement farther south is impossible, because the corridor south of Denniston Road is fenced off by barbed wire. After roughly 1 1/2 miles (2.4 km), it crosses Sand Hill Road before approaching the hamlet of Gardiner at the 2 1/2-mile (4.0 km) mark. Once in the hamlet, the trail intersects U.S. Route 44 (concurrent with State Route 55).

Located within the hamlet are a defunct, former dairy creamery and the site of the former Gardiner railroad station. Built in 1881 and opened the following year, the creamery was one of the dairies that transported its products to New York City by way of the Wallkill Valley Railroad. It was originally the property of the Borden family, but closed in the 1920s, and has since been renovated as an apartment complex. The former Gardiner railroad station ceased operations when the rail line closed. It became a sporting goods store by 1981, a video store by the early 1990s, and an antique store by 1995. The station burned down on October 10, 2002.

The trail crosses Phillies Bridge Road 1 mile (1.6 km) north of the hamlet, with an overpass carrying the trail over Forest Glen Road 3/4 mile (1.2 km) farther. The road overlies the Catskill Aqueduct and Delaware Aqueduct. Originally supported by trestles and a stone foundation, the overpass was rebuilt in 1910 during the construction of the Catskill Aqueduct. The reconstruction removed the trestles and added a concrete foundation. Though a local legend holds that the bridge was originally built in response to the death of a prominent woman at the Forest Glen railroad crossing, it is more likely that it was built to maintain the rail line at a consistent grade. A little over 1/10 mile (0.16 km) from the bridge is the site of the former Forest Glen station. The trail crosses Bridge Creek Road and Old Ford Road about 1/4 and 1 mile (0.40 and 1.61 km) from the Forest Glen bridge, respectively, before entering the town of New Paltz.

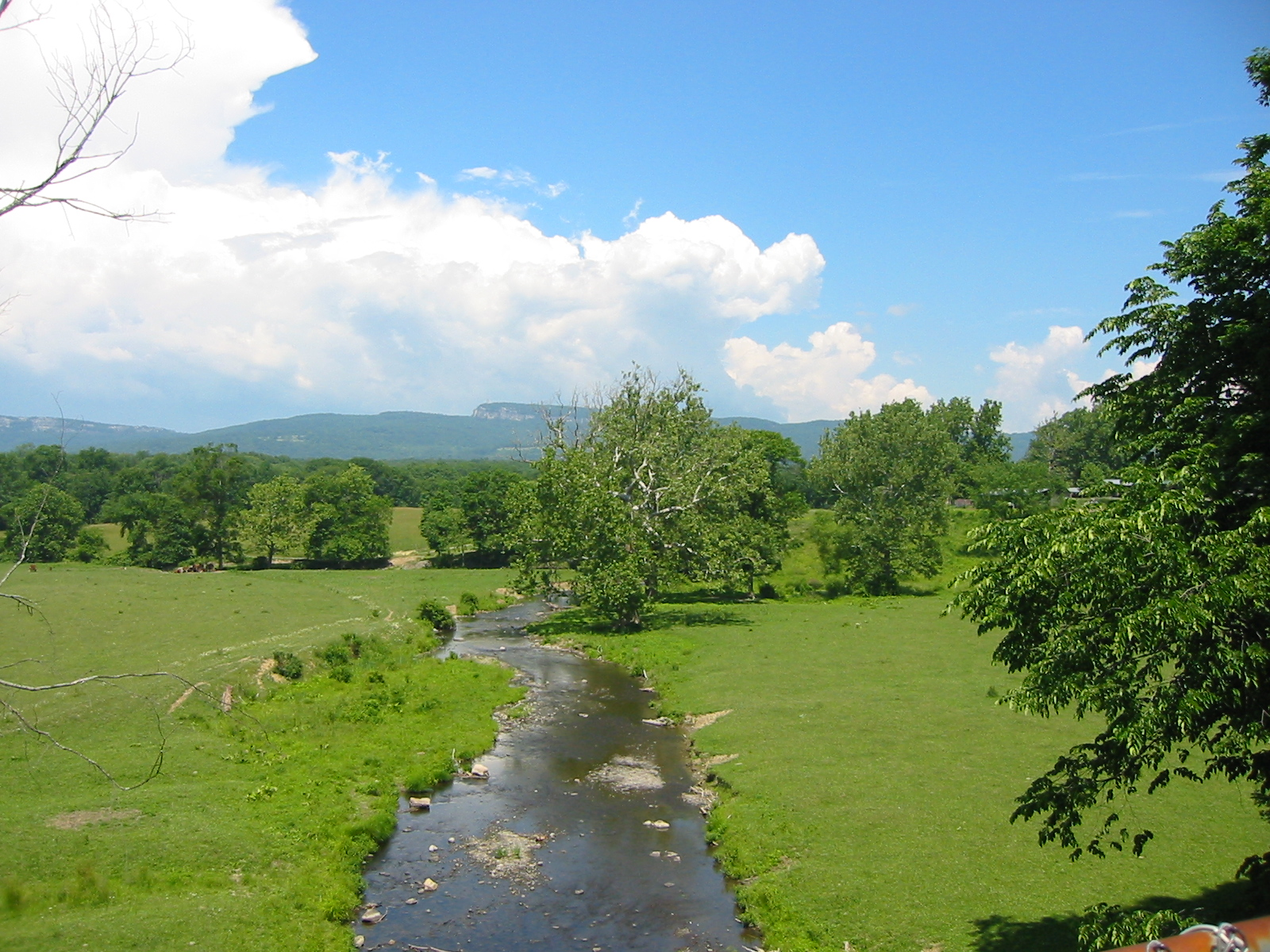
View of the Plattekill Creek and Shawangunk Ridge from the Plattekill Creek bridge

Shortly after entering New Paltz, the trail crosses a bridge over Plattekill Creek. The masonry for the bridge was completed by late June 1870, and trestle work was done by July. Originally made of wood, the bridge was accidentally set on fire in 1880 by ashes or sparks from a passing train. This prompted the railroad to coat its rail ties with tin while replacing its wooden bridges with ones made of stone. The bridge's original abutments were made of Shawangunk conglomerate. It was rebuilt in 1912, and crosses the Plattekill Creek at a height of 35 feet (11 m). The Shawangunk Ridge is visible from the bridge.

Plains Road is shortly after the bridge, and the trail continues for 3/10 mile (0.48 km) before crossing Cedar Lane. It crosses Plains Road again after another 1 1/5 miles (1.9 km), reaching the Sojourner Truth park in the village of New Paltz. The trail is connected to the park via a small footbridge constructed in 2010 by the Alexandria, Minnesota–based construction company Contech. It has a weight limit of 5 short tons (4.5 t) and is able to withstand earthquakes.

At the edge of the park, the trail crosses Water Street and enters the Water Street Market, a "restored area of boutiques, galleries, and cafés". It then crosses State Route 299 and passes La Stazione, the former railroad station. The refurbished depot had been originally built in 1870, rebuilt after a 1907 fire, and sold to private interests in 1959. The building was in a state of disrepair by the early 1980s, but renovated in 1988 and converted to an Italian restaurant in 1999. Over the next 1/2 mile (0.80 km), the trail passes North Front Street, Broadhead Avenue, and Mulberry Street. After another 1/2 mile (0.80 km) the trail traverses Huguenot Street, a historic district containing colonial-era stone houses. Some of the houses date to the late 1600s.

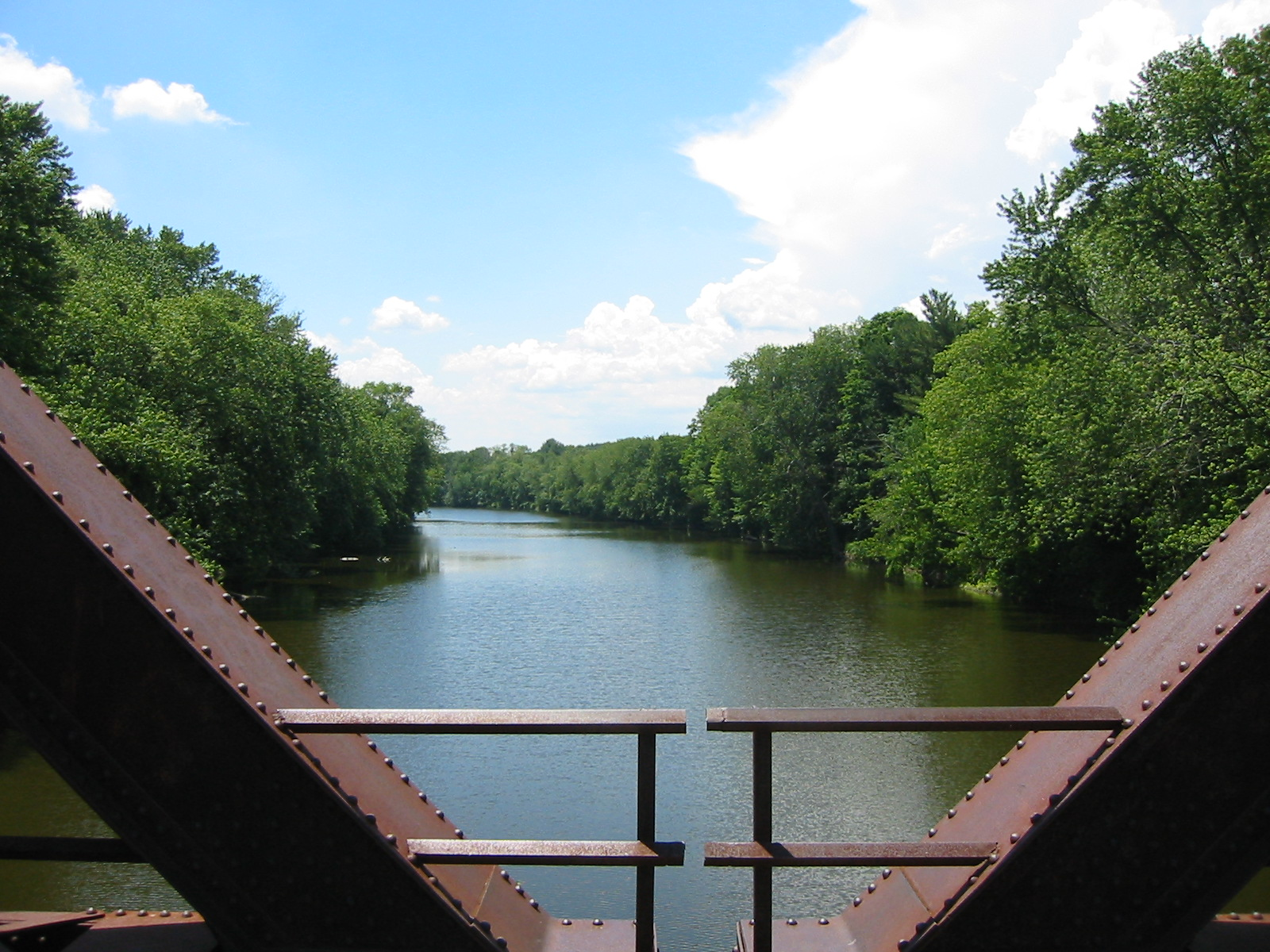
View of the Wallkill River from the Springtown bridge

About 1 mile (1.6 km) from Huguenot Street, the trail reaches the 413-foot (126 m) Springtown bridge spanning the Wallkill River. The bridge was originally made of wood and completed by the middle of December 1870, but was rebuilt between 1880 and 1881, using iron, by Clarke, Reeves & Co. It was rated by the superintendent of the Wallkill Valley Railroad to be safe for rail traffic as fast as 40 miles per hour (64 km/h). The bridge's decking and benches were put in place in 1993 by volunteers and members of the nearby Hutterite community in the hamlet of Rifton. The design of the bridge's railings was influenced by equestrians to better accommodate horses. Immediately after the bridge is Springtown Road.

The trail continues west of the Wallkill River. Roughly 1 1/2 miles (2.4 km) from the Springtown bridge, the trail crosses Cragswood Road. Another 3/10 mile (0.48 km) farther, it reaches the New Paltz–Rosendale boundary line, continuing another 3 miles (4.8 km) on formerly private property to Mountain Road in the hamlet of Rosendale. Restorations to the Rosendale trestle were completed, and the bridge was opened to the public in June, 2013. This added 11 1/2 miles (18.5 km) over the Rondout Creek to Kingston, crossing Interstate 87 and terminating by State Route 32. The extension passes through the town of Ulster and includes four small bridges between Rosendale and Kingston.

== Recreation ==
The road between the former railroad station and Water Street Market was the first site of a new town crosswalk system that opened on March 29, 2008. Under the new system, pedestrians can use flags placed in roadside containers to signal traffic. The trail connects with the Sojourner Truth park, which has had access to the Wallkill River for kayaking and canoeing since April 27, 2003. The Minnewaska Preserve and Mohonk Preserve, featuring 60 miles (97 km) of combined walkways, can be reached through New Paltz.

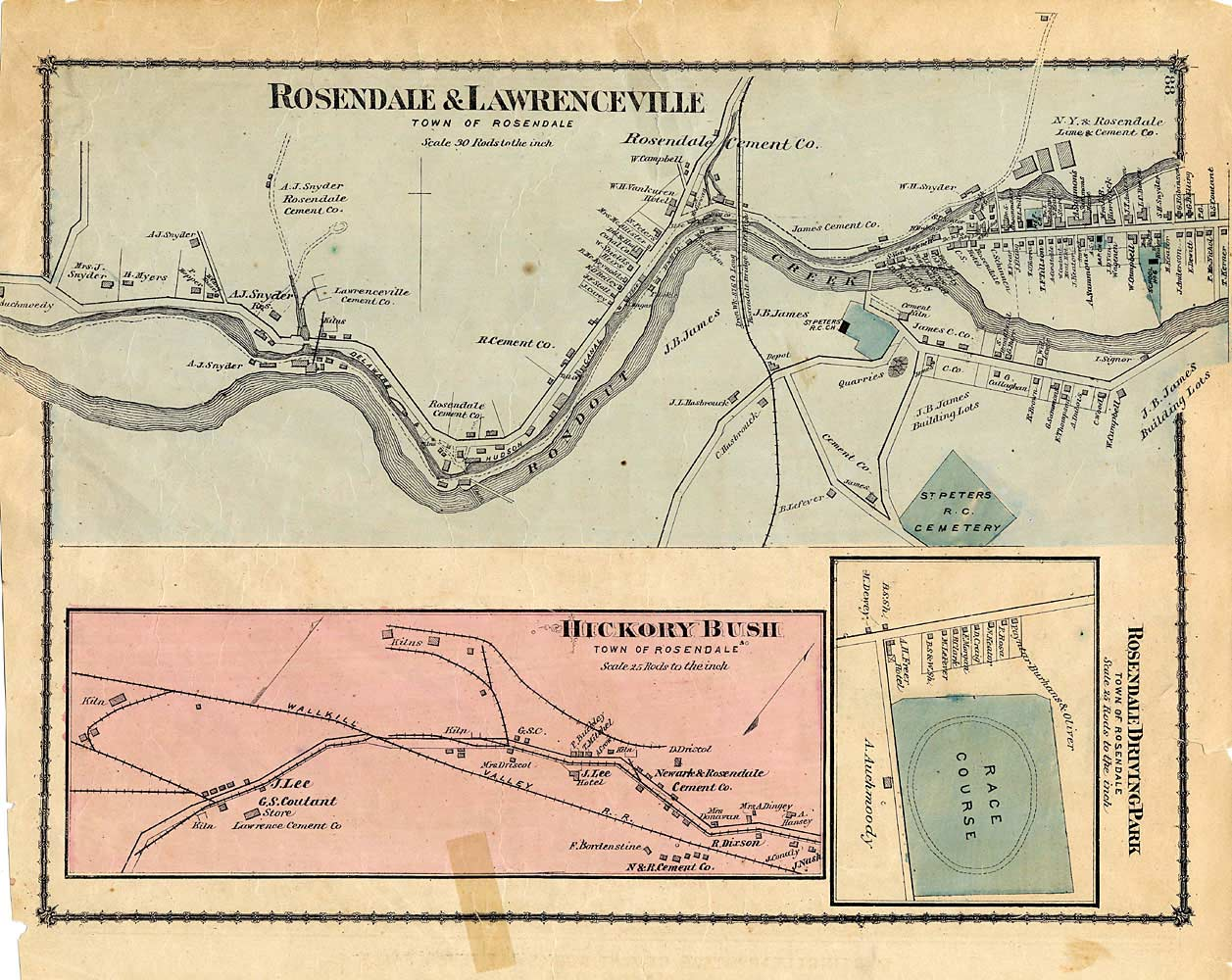
An 1875 map showing the Wallkill rail line passing through Rosendale's cement district

The trail connects to the Binnewater Historic District in Rosendale. The district was the location of several local quarries which opened throughout the region after the 1825 discovery of rocks capable of producing Rosendale cement in the nearby hamlet of High Falls. At its peak, the district was producing 4,000,000 barrels a year and employed 5,000 people.

Though the Binnewater rail station was once part of the historic district, it was located too close to Binnewater Road and was hit repeatedly by trucks until it fell apart in May 1989. The station was subsequently demolished by the county highway department. Another historic district, the Snyder Estate, runs along the Rosendale section. The Snyder Estate is a former mining site once used by all four major regional cement producers. The Rosendale trestle has been the site of numerous picnics, barbecues, and at least one wedding. One person has tried bungee jumping off the bridge without a restraining cord.

Several shale outcrops are visible along the trail, with views of the Shawangunk Ridge to the west; the skytop tower of the Mohonk Mountain House is visible on one of the cliffs. Parking for the trail is provided at a municipal lot on Farmers Turnpike in Gardiner. In New Paltz, there are parking lots at the Sojourner Truth park, off Springtown Road, at the Huguenot Historical Society, and at a Board of Cooperative Educational Services (BOCES) conference center. The trail runs parallel to state routes 208 and 32; there are two park and rides on Route 32, a 63-spot lot in New Paltz, and a 58-spot lot in Rosendale. There are two bicycle shops along the trail in both Gardiner and New Paltz.

== Surface ==
The surface of the Rail Trail is mostly gravel, while road crossings are paved. Mountain bikes are recommended to traverse to trail by cycle, as the trail is fairly rough. Cars are not allowed on the trail. In the winter, you can do cross-country skiing on the trail.

== Flora and fauna ==
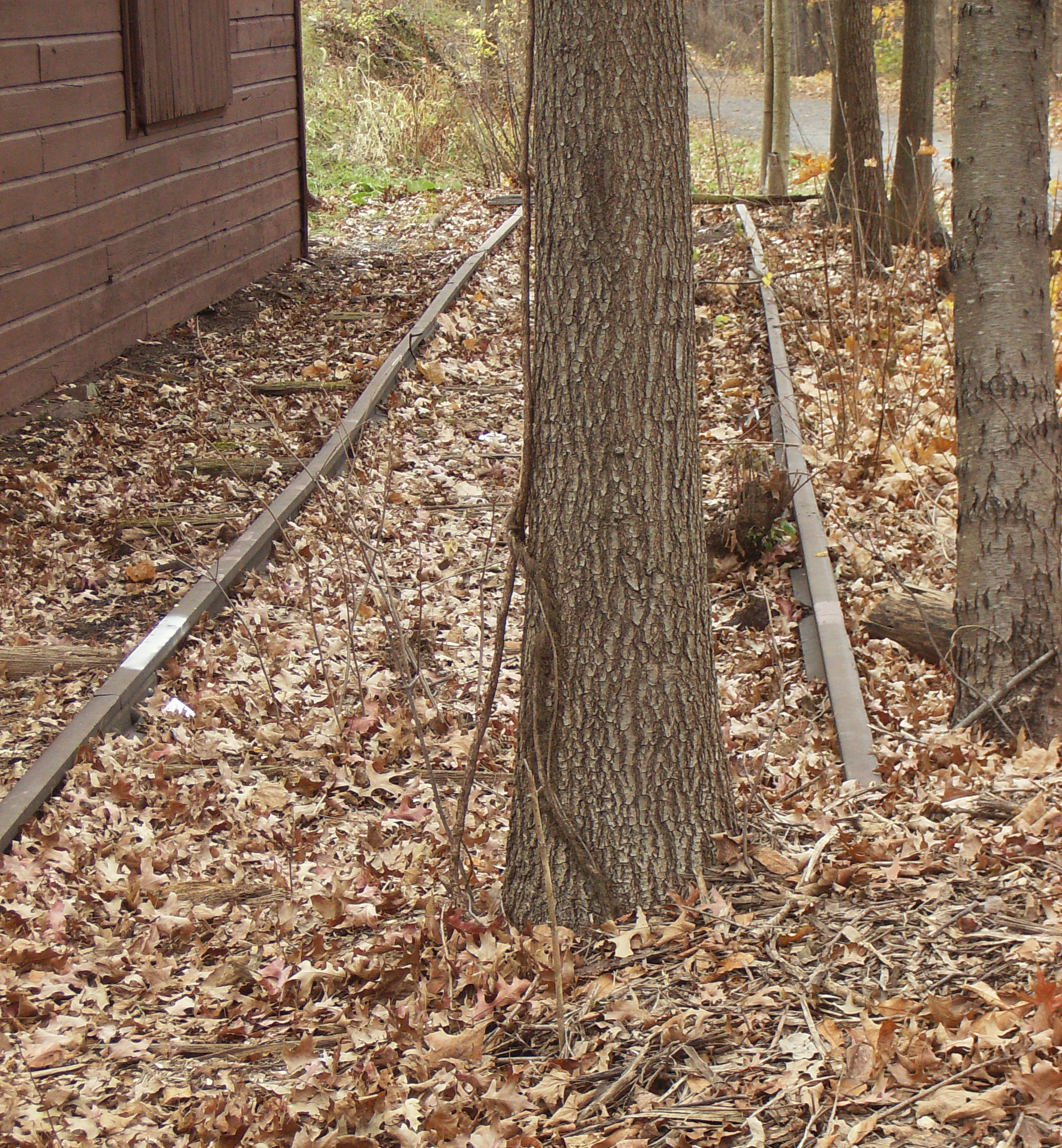
A tree growing between the rails of a siding at the Sojourner Truth park in the village of New Paltz

Flora along the northern end of the trail includes sumac (Rhus) and honeysuckle (Lonicera) shrubs, American elm (Ulmus americana), bigtooth aspen (Populus grandidentata) and quaking aspen (Populus tremuloides). As the trail approaches Gardiner to the south, there are occurrences of sugar maple (Acer saccharum), American beech (Fagus grandifolia), tulip-tree (Liriodendron tulipifera) and black birch (Betula lenta). Other trees common on the trail include red maple (Acer rubrum), shagbark hickory (Carya ovata), northern pin oak (Quercus ellipsoidalis), eastern red cedar (Juniperus virginiana), white ash (Fraxinus americana) and eastern white pine (Pinus strobus).

Many animals pass through the trail unobserved, leaving behind tracks. This includes bears, deer, coyotes, dogs, bobcats, cats, skunks and rabbits. Several bird species overwinter in the region and can be observed from the trail, such as the mourning dove (Zenaida macroura), blue jay (Cyanocitta cristata), bluebird (Sialia), cardinal (Cardinalis cardinalis), starling (Sturnus vulgaris), downy woodpecker (Picoides pubescens), American goldfinch (Spinus tristis), tufted titmouse (Baeolophus bicolor), black-capped chickadee (Poecile atricapillus), sparrow (Passer) and purple finch (Carpodacus purpureus).

== In popular culture ==
The Springtown Truss Bridge was used as a location for key scenes in the John Krasinski horror film A Quiet Place, as well as its sequel.

== See also ==
- Walden–Wallkill Rail Trail – the southern continuation of the former rail corridor

== Bibliography ==
- Chazin, Daniel D. (2001). New York Walk Book: A Companion to the New Jersey Walk Book (7th ed.). Mahwah, NJ: New York – New Jersey Trail Conference. ISBN 1-880775-30-1.
- Genero, Peter P. (2005). Thank Rosendale: New York – The Empire State. Fort Pierce, FL: Genero Inc. ISBN 0-9759419-1-7.
- Mabee, Carleton (1995). Listen to the Whistle: An Anecdotal History of the Wallkill Valley Railroad. Fleishmanns, NY: Purple Mountain Press. ISBN 0-935796-69-X.
- Mabee, Carleton (2003). Gardiner and Lake Minnewaska. Mount Pleasant, SC: Arcadia Publishing. ISBN 0-7385-1185-4.
- Penna, Craig Della; Sexton, Tom (2002). The Official Rails-to-Trails Conservancy Guidebook. Guilford, CT: Globe Pequot Press. ISBN 978-0-7627-0450-7.
- Perls, Jeffrey (2003). Shawangunks Trail Companion: A Complete Guide to Hiking, Mountain Biking, Cross-Country Skiing, and More Only 90 Miles from New York City. Woodstock, VT: Countryman Press. ISBN 978-0-88150-563-4.
