= Walden–Wallkill Rail Trail =

Rail trail in New York, US

Coordinates: 41°33′45″N 74°11′03″W

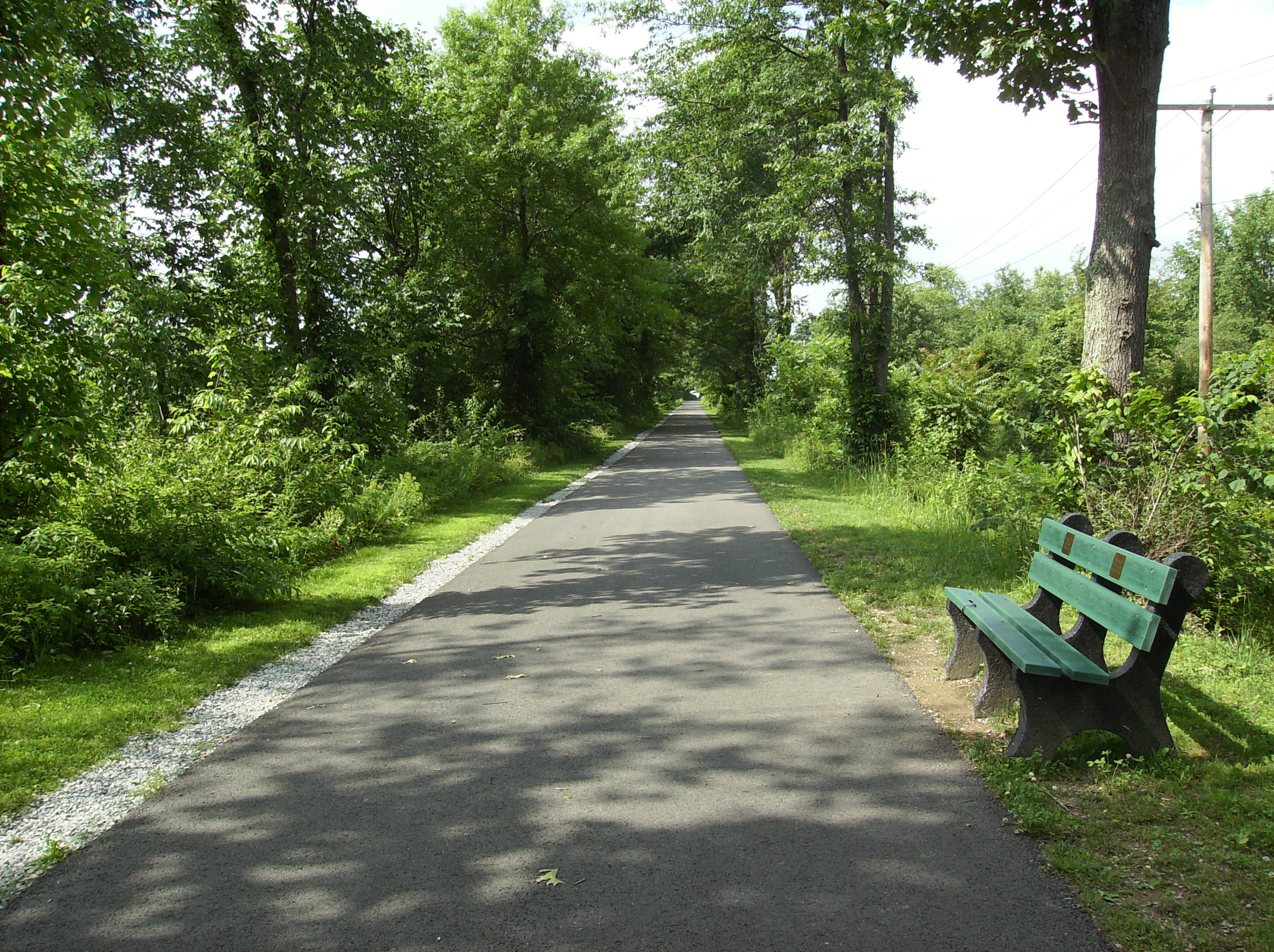
- Section of the trail in Shawangunk, New York
- Length: 3.22 mi (5.18 km)
- Location: Orange County, New York; Ulster County, New York
- Trailheads: Walden; Wallkill
- Use: Walking; jogging; bicycling; dog walking
- Sights: Shawangunk Ridge; Wooster Grove Park; Borden Estate
- Hazards: Paved section may be unsuitable for horseback riders

The Walden–Wallkill Rail Trail, also known as the Jesse McHugh Rail Trail, is a 3.22-mile (5.18 km) rail trail between the village of Walden and the neighboring hamlet of Wallkill. The two communities are located in Orange County and Ulster County, respectively, in upstate New York.

The trail, like the Wallkill Valley Rail Trail to the north, is part of the former Wallkill Valley Railroad's rail corridor. The railway was the first to operate in Ulster County and transported goods and people. Passenger service ended in 1937 due to declining customers, and the opening of the New York State Thruway and decreased freight traffic caused the line to close in 1957. The land was purchased by the towns of Montgomery and Shawangunk in 1985 and converted to a public trail. The portion of the trail in Shawangunk was formally opened in 1993 and named after former town supervisor Jesse McHugh. Plans to pave the trail between Walden and Wallkill were first discussed in 2001, and the route was finally paved between 2008 and 2009. The trail includes an unofficial, unimproved section to the north of Wallkill, and is bounded by New York State Route 52 and NY 208.

== History ==
=== Rise and decline of the railroad ===
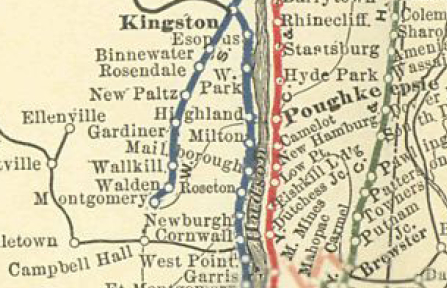
The original Wallkill Valley rail line (left), stretching from Montgomery to Kingston

Stretching 33 miles (53 km) from Montgomery to Kingston, the Wallkill Valley Railroad began operation in 1866, the first railroad to operate in Ulster County. Construction from Montgomery began in 1868, and the line was open to Wallkill that same year.

The railroad allowed inventor Gail Borden to distribute his dairy products more widely; Borden patented the process for creating condensed milk in 1854 and the Borden family subsequently owned a series of milk companies in the area. By 1870, newspaper editors had attributed the rapid development and increasing land prices in Walden and its surrounding area to the railroad.

Ridership decreased more than 90% between 1893 and 1931, dropping to just one person per day by the time passenger service ceased in 1937. The line remained open to freight traffic. After the opening of the New York State Thruway and the closure of other rail lines, the Wallkill's stations were closed in 1957. The last regular freight run through the line was on December 31, 1977. In the 1980s, Conrail, then the owner of the Wallkill Valley line, attempted to sell the former rail corridor. The towns of Montgomery and Shawangunk – in Orange County and Ulster County, respectively – purchased their sections of the rail line to allow "development of a commercial corridor [as well as] utility easements and access" to a local reservoir.

=== Development of the corridor ===
The Montgomery section consisted of 2 miles (3.2 km) from the village of Walden to the town line with Shawangunk, and the Shawangunk section ran 2.3 miles (3.7 km) north from the town line to Birch Road. The purchases were completed in August and October 1985, respectively. In November of that year, the New York State Department of Correctional Services bought 1.4 miles (2.3 km) of the former corridor in Shawangunk's hamlet of Wallkill, near the Wallkill Correctional Facility. This portion extends from Birch Road to the town line with Gardiner. The Shawangunk Correctional Facility was built at that location. South of Walden, the corridor remains an active rail line operated by the Norfolk Southern Railway.

North of the prisons, the former corridor continues as the separate Wallkill Valley Rail Trail. Rail trail enthusiasts have been trying to find a way to combine the two rail trails since the 1990s, and in 2004 the town of Shawangunk commissioned an open space study that identified possible ways to accomplish such a connection. A 2008 Ulster County transportation plan included projects to connect the trails, and the town of Shawangunk considered plans to connect the trails by diverting the corridor along Birch Road. The original route of the corridor is 40 feet (12 m) within the prisons' perimeter fence, extending for half a mile within the prison grounds.

The portion of the former corridor running through the center of Wallkill was converted to a road, Railroad Avenue. The southern part of the route, running from Wallkill to the Montgomery–Shawangunk town line, was officially opened as the Jesse McHugh Rail Trail on June 5, 1993. Jesse McHugh was a former Shawangunk town supervisor. The northern portion of the Shawangunk section, which stretches to the border of the prison grounds, is maintained by the town but not officially part of the trail.

=== Maintaining the rail trail ===
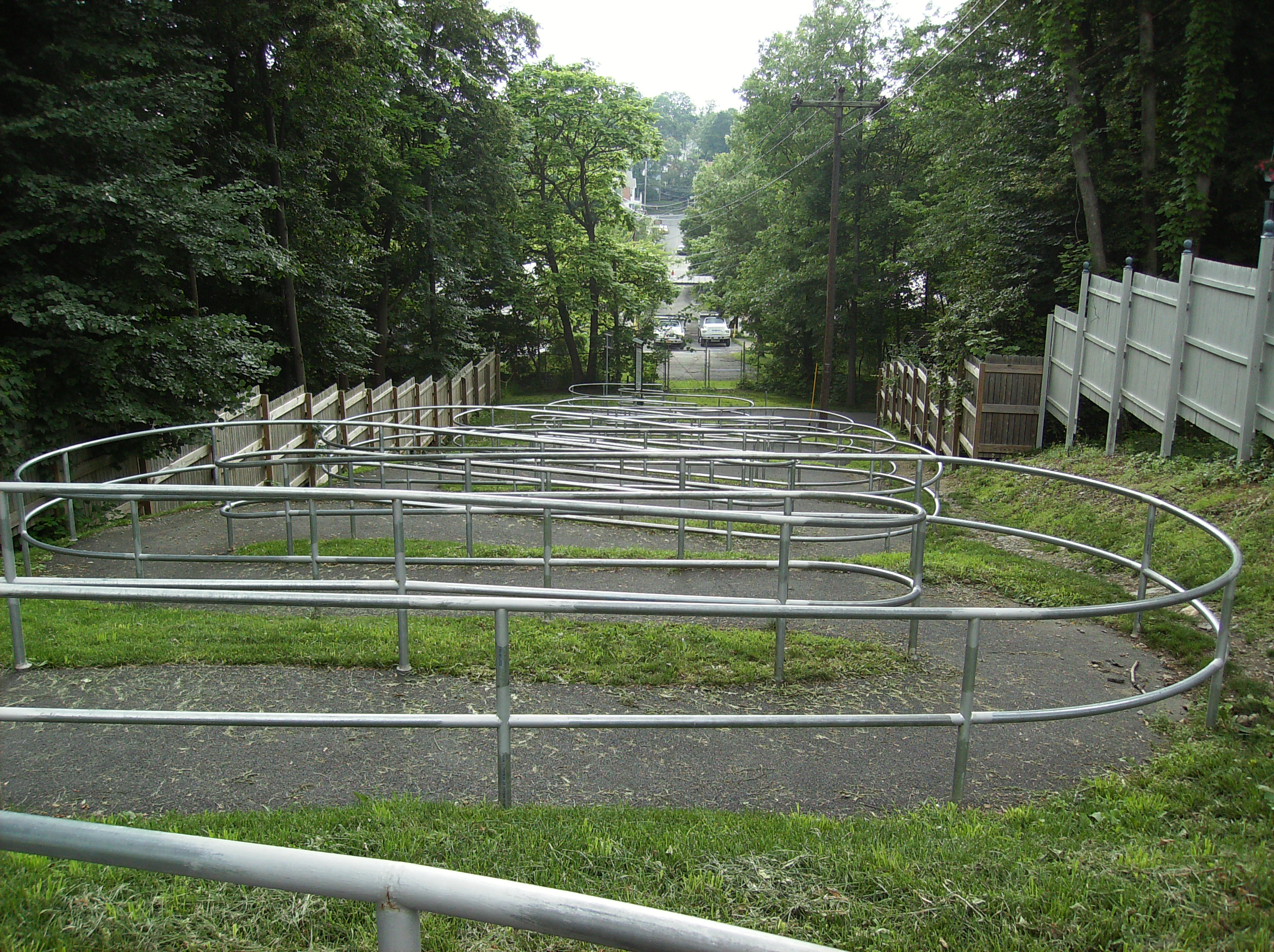
The winding, handicapped-accessible path from the street to the trailhead in the village of Walden

In 2001, Shawangunk, Montgomery and Walden began applying for over $600,000 in TEA-21 grants to create a paved, accessible trail between Walden and Wallkill compliant with the Americans with Disabilities Act of 1990. The total cost of paving the trail was expected to be $750,000, though it eventually ballooned to $1.5 million. The decision to pave the trail was vehemently opposed by horseback riders who felt it would endanger them, and protested at several public meetings by the Mid-Hudson Horse Trails Association. The decision was also opposed by nearby homeowners who believed an increase in trail use would threaten their privacy.

In October 2003, Walden, Shawangunk and Montgomery acquired the $600,000 grant needed to begin paving the trail. Two months later, Bob and Doris Kimball, a couple in Montgomery, donated 20 acres (8.1 ha) of their land to create a park by the trail near Lake Osiris Road. The park is expected to be developed once funds are available to do so. Nearly $200,000 in funding to complete pavement of the trail was lost when the outgoing 109th Congress did not approve a 2006 budget bill. In February 2008, Congressman Maurice Hinchey announced the appropriation of $351,000 to complete the project. Construction began on September 22, 2008, and the paved 3.22-mile (5.18 km) trail opened on May 2, 2009. Flooding from hurricanes in 2011 caused a cave-in along the Montgomery section of the trail. The storms eroded much of the ground beneath the trail, causing the ground to sink. In 2012 the cost of fully repairing the trail was estimated to be $214,000.

Emergency trail repairs in Walden were performed in 2014; Montgomery and Shawangunk are each responsible for maintenance of the trail within their respective towns. The trail was expected to receive a sealcoating in spring 2022.

Plans to connect the Walden–Wallkill Rail Trail with the Wallkill Valley Rail were deprioritized for decades due to complications involving the prisons. At one point there was an active farm on the prison grounds, where inmates would work and walk the grounds unimpeded. Since that time, the Wallkill facility has had its security increased; an extra fence has been put up, increasing the likelihood of connecting the trails through the property.

== Route ==
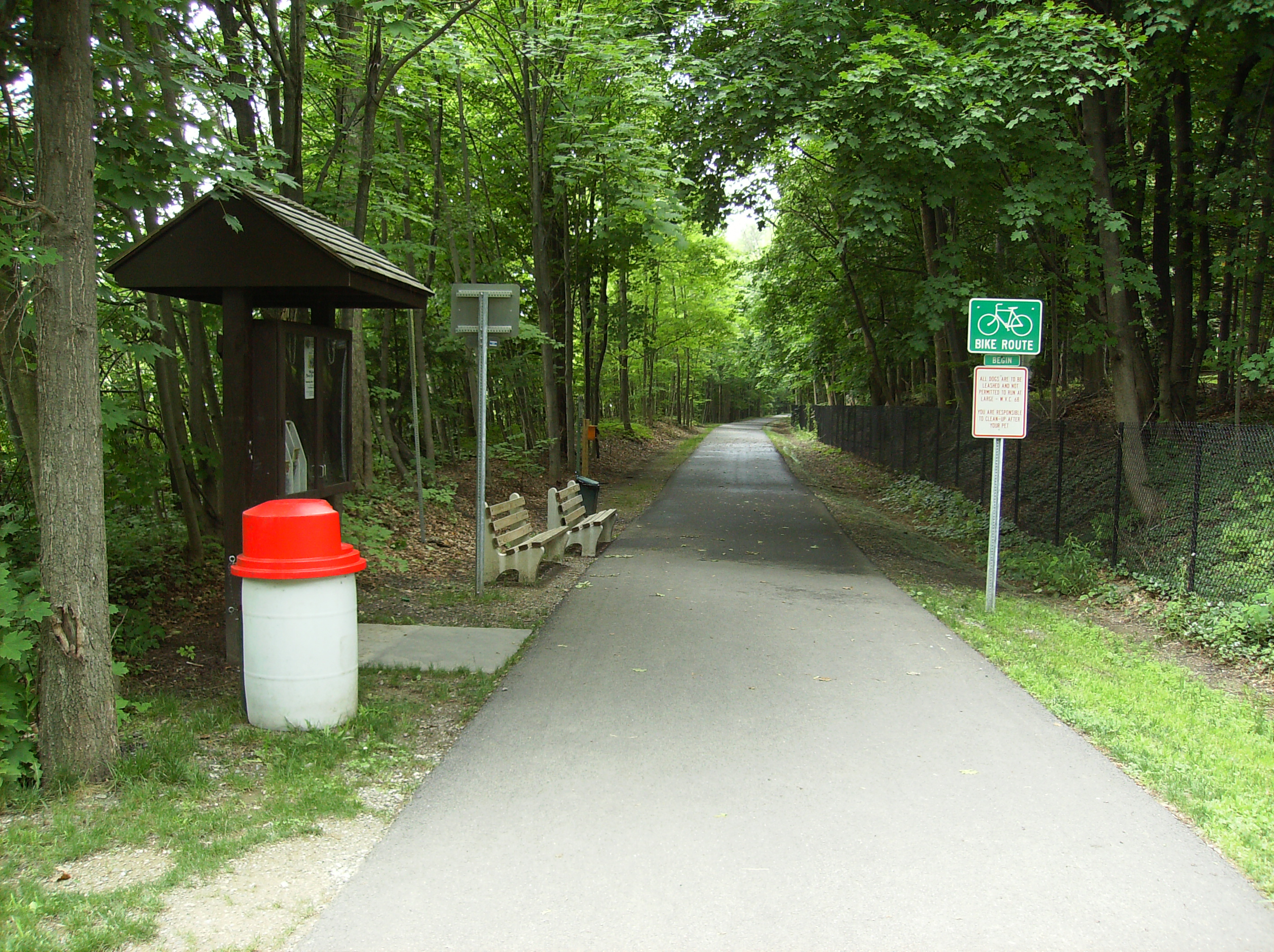
The trailhead in the village of Walden

The trail begins at the 9.4-acre (3.8 ha) Wooster Grove Park in the village of Walden, near NY 52. There is a visitor center for rail trail users at the park. The park also contains Walden's former train station, which has since been renovated as a recreational facility.

The trail continues 1 mile (1.6 km) north from the trailhead before reaching Lake Osiris Road, continuing another 1 1/4 miles (2.0 km) to the Montgomery–Shawangunk town line. Once in Shawangunk, the trail passes by the Borden Estate, a mansion built in 1906 by the granddaughter of Gail Borden. The trail borders the estate on the east.

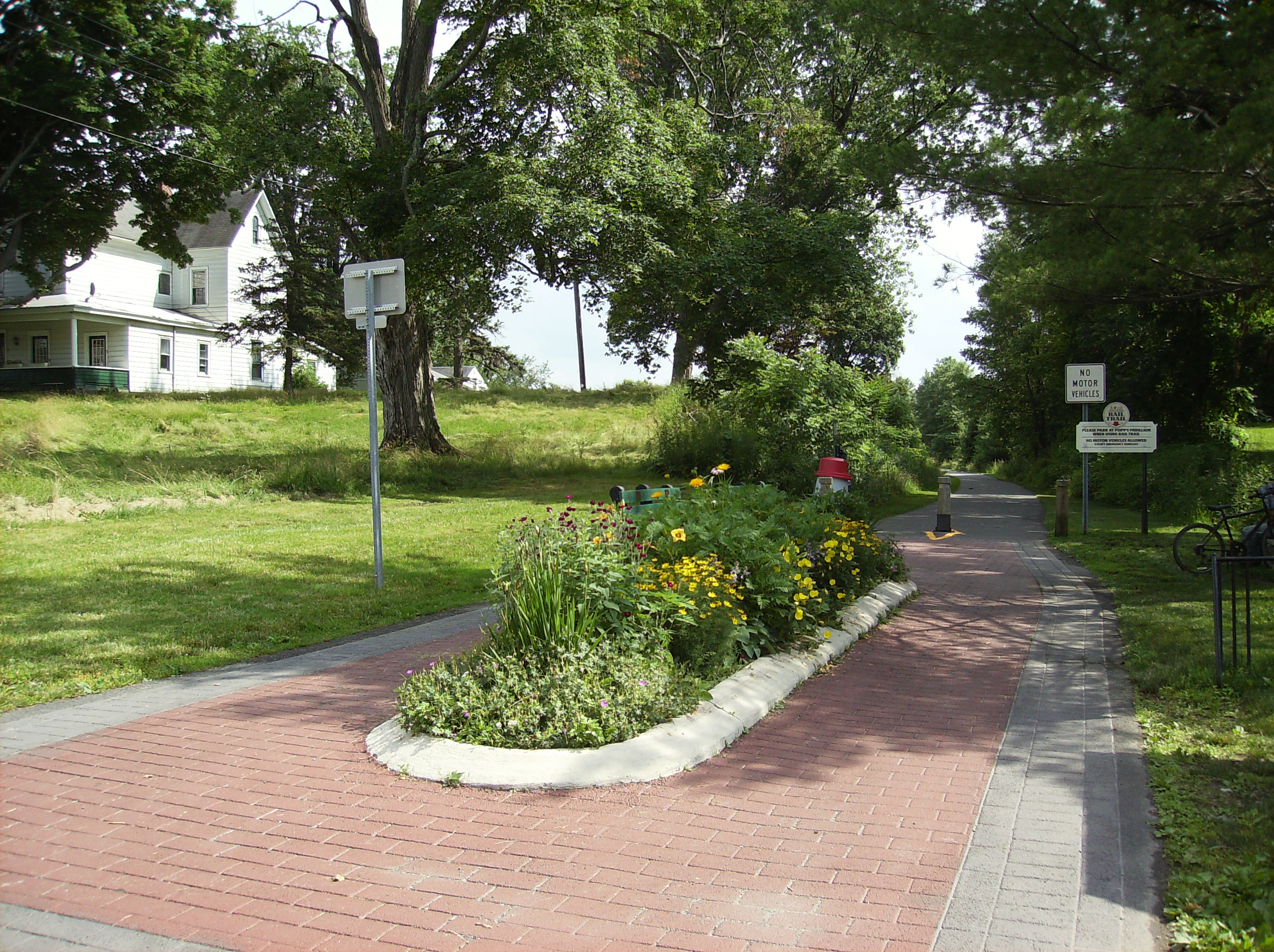
The trailhead in the hamlet of Wallkill

About 3/4 mile (1.2 km) from the town line, the trail reaches its Wallkill trailhead bordering NY 208, directly across the street from the Shawangunk police station. The paved section between Walden and Wallkill is flat, with only a 3% grade. A portion of the former corridor in central Wallkill has since been converted to a road.

An unimproved northern section in Wallkill extends 1 1/2 miles (2.4 km) from the intersection of Railroad Avenue and C. E. Penny Drive to Birch Road. Birch Road marks the border between the former corridor and two state prisons. This section passes through unmarked private hunting grounds. While the total length of the trail is officially only about 3 miles (4.8 km), the inclusion of the northern section increases its length to about 4 1/2 miles (7.2 km). The trail is used for walking, jogging, bicycling and dog walking.

== Bibliography ==
- Mabee, Carleton (1995). Listen to the Whistle: An Anecdotal History of the Wallkill Valley Railroad. Fleishmanns, NY: Purple Mountain Press. ISBN 0-935796-69-X.
- Perls, Jeffrey (2003). Shawangunks Trail Companion: A Complete Guide to Hiking, Mountain Biking, Cross-Country Skiing, and More Only 90 Miles from New York City. Woodstock, VT: Countryman Press. ISBN 978-0-88150-563-4.
