= Rosendale Trestle =

Railroad truss bridge in New York, U.S.

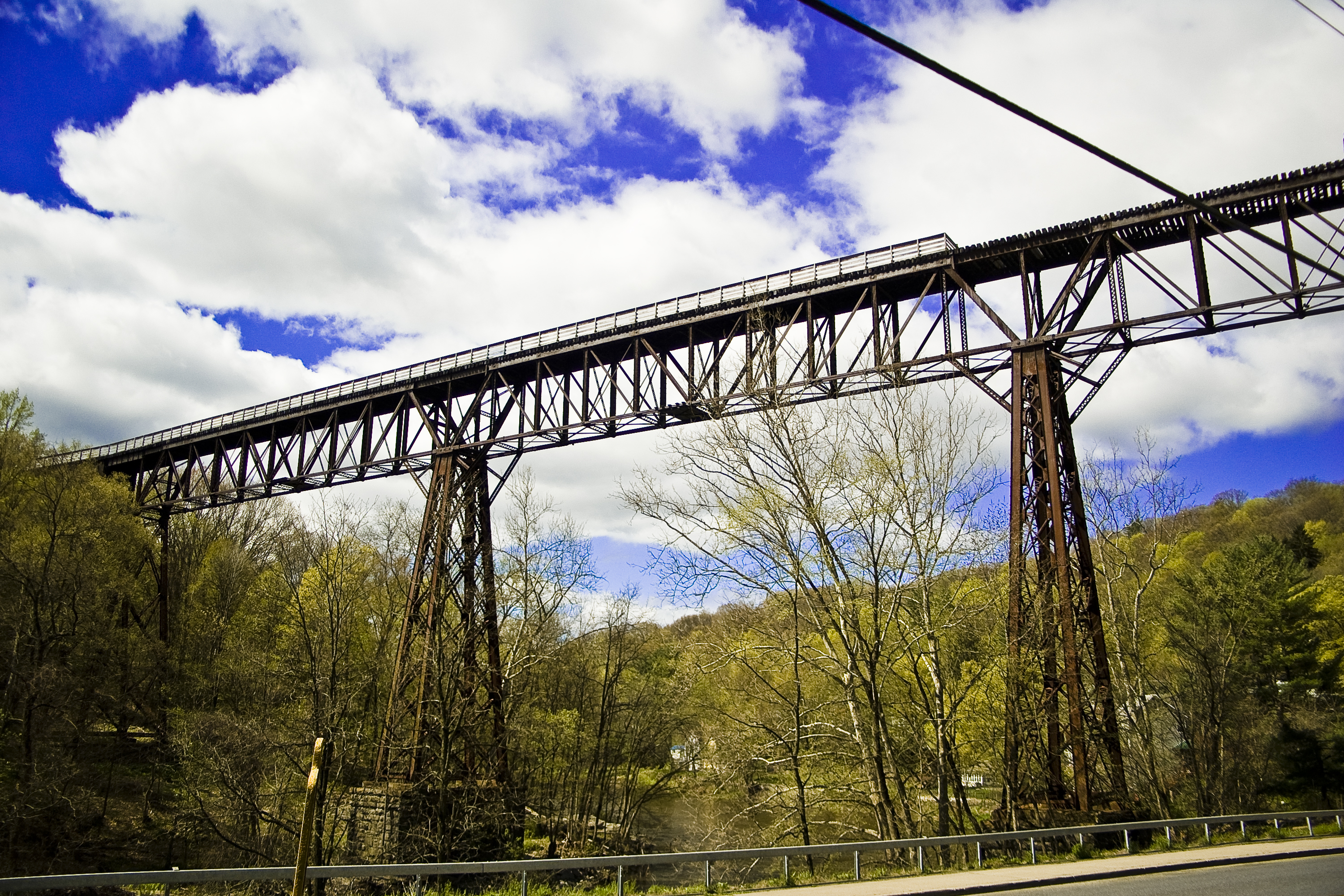
- The trestle in April 2011
- Coordinates: 41°50′36″N 74°05′18″W
- Carries: Wallkill Valley Rail Trail, formerly Wallkill Valley Railroad
- Crosses: Rondout Creek; New York State Route 213; Formerly the Delaware and Hudson Canal
- Locale: Rosendale, New York, United States

Characteristics
- Design: Post truss
- Material: Steel
- Total length: 940 feet (290 m)
- Width: 6 ft (1,829 mm) (broad gauge)
- No. of spans: 9
- Clearance below: 150 feet (46 m) above the water

History
- Constructed by: A. L. Dolby & Company; Waston Manufacturing Company; King Bridge Company
- Fabrication by: Carnegie Steel Company
- Construction start: 1870
- Construction end: 1872
- Inaugurated: April 6, 1872

Location
- Interactive map of Rosendale Trestle

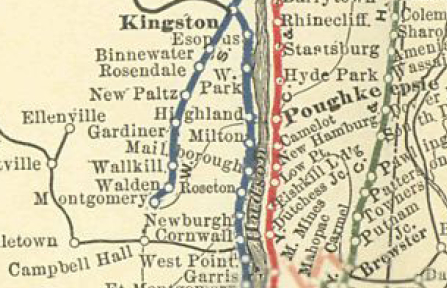
The original Wallkill Valley rail line, stretching from Montgomery to Kingston

The Rosendale Trestle is a 940-foot (290-meter) continuous truss bridge and former railroad trestle in Rosendale Village, a hamlet in the town of Rosendale in Ulster County, New York. Originally constructed by the Wallkill Valley Railroad to continue its rail line from New Paltz to Kingston, the bridge rises 150 ft (46 m) above Rondout Creek, spanning both Route 213 and the former Delaware and Hudson Canal. Construction on the trestle began in late 1870, and continued until early 1872. When it opened to rail traffic on April 6, 1872, the Rosendale trestle was the highest span bridge in the United States.

The trestle was rebuilt in 1895 by the King Bridge Company to address public concerns regarding its stability, and it has been repeatedly reinforced throughout its existence. Concern over the sturdiness of the trestle has persisted since its opening, and was a major reason Conrail closed the Wallkill Valley rail line in 1977. After the rail line's closure, Conrail sold the bridge in 1986 for one dollar to John E. Rahl, a private area businessman, who tried unsuccessfully to operate the trestle as a bungee jumping platform in the 1990s. A similar attempt was made the following decade. The trestle was seized by the county in 2009 for tax nonpayment, and renovated as a pedestrian walkway for the Wallkill Valley Rail Trail. The deck and railings now continue all the way across the trestle, and access is from a parking lot about 1/4 mile (400 meters) north on Binnewater Road. It opened to the public with a celebration on June 29, 2013.

== History ==
=== Construction ===
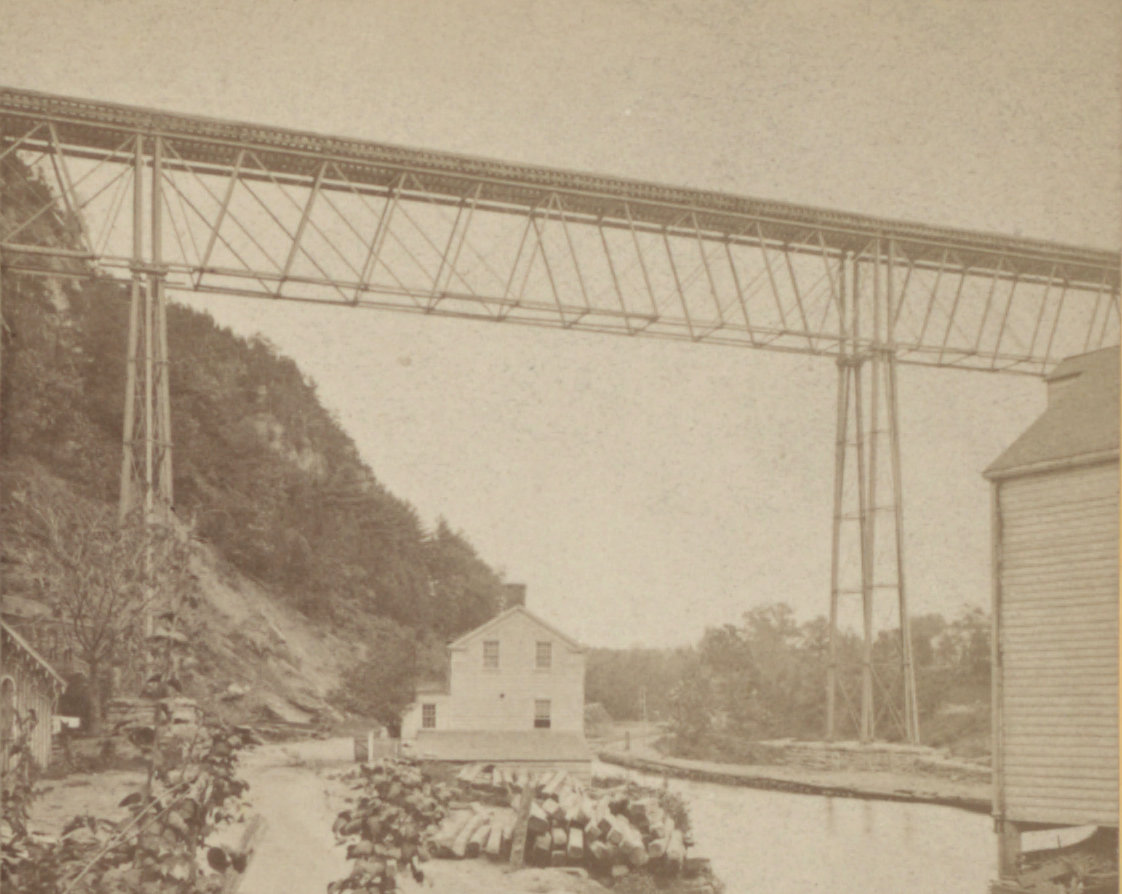
The railroad bridge as it was originally built, prior to its 1895 reconstruction

In 1870, the Wallkill Valley Railroad operated trains between Montgomery and New Paltz, New York, and began building a 413-foot (126 m) bridge south of Rosendale, at Springtown Road, to cross the Wallkill River. The Springtown bridge was completed by 1871, and the rail line was opened north to the town of Rosendale. Rosendale issued $92,800 in bonds on May 13, 1869, to finance its portion of the railroad.

Though the trestle was difficult to build, and viewed as weak by modern standards, it was remarkable for its time, and can be considered the "most awesome part" of the Wallkill Valley rail line. Construction on the bridge's abutments began in August, 1870 by A. L. Dolby & Company, but work on the superstructure by the Waston Manufacturing Company did not begin until the following year due to problems with quicksand during the excavation. Sections of the superstructure were built in Paterson, New Jersey. The bridge originally had seven wrought-iron spans and two shorter wooden spans; the longer spans were each 105 feet (32 m) in length. The bridge cost $250,000 to build, and followed a Post truss design. Roughly 1,000 short tons (910 t) of iron and 420,000 board feet (990 m^{3}) of timber went into its construction. At the time of its completion in January, 1872, it had the highest span of any bridge in the United States. Due to its height, it could "scarcely be crossed for the first time without something like a feeling of terror". The bridge allowed the rail line to continue north to Kingston.

=== Active rail service ===
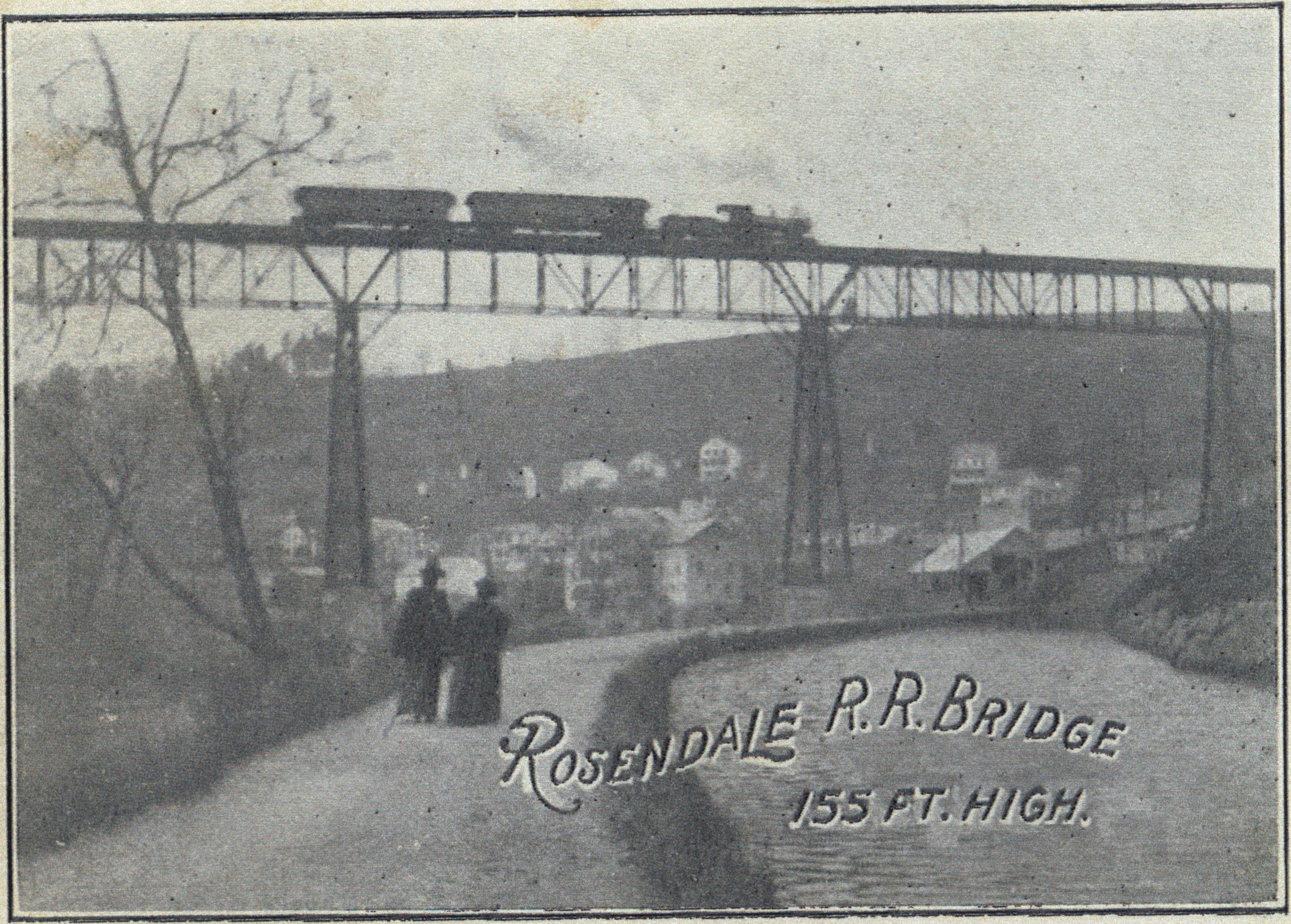
A depiction of two women walking under the trestle, in the area known as "Dead Man's Stretch"

The bridge was opened on April 6, 1872, in a ceremony attended by 5,000 people, including prominent men from across Ulster, Orange, and Dutchess counties. One of the spectators was James S. McEntee, Esq., an engineer who had worked on the Delaware and Hudson Canal in 1825. He was the only person to have seen both "the passage of the first loaded boat through the canal and the first train over the bridge which spans it". A 4-4-0 locomotive with five boxcars and two passenger cars made the inaugural run. Many spectators doubted the strength of the bridge, and believed that the trestle would collapse under the weight of the train. The bridge appeared unaffected by the strain, and an increasing number of people rode over the bridge during the second and third runs.

A. L. Dolby & Company was contracted to complete the rail line between the bridge and Kingston. The track reached the Kingston Railroad Station in November 1872. By this time, Ulster and Delaware Railroad trains were running regularly to and from Kingston. (Note: Sources say that trains were running to and from Kingston by October 1872, but that the rail line was not completed to Kingston until that November.)

By 1885, the bridge supports were reinforced and the track was converted from broad gauge to standard gauge. In 1888, the Wallkill Valley Railroad received a permit from the town of Rosendale to "construct and maintain abutments to support [the] trestle" as long as such work did not interfere with traffic along the underlying highway (present-day NY 213). That same year, the Delaware and Hudson Canal allowed the railroad to temporarily use some of its property by the Rondout Creek to place bents for bridge repairs. The waterway beneath the trestle could be quite treacherous; so many people drowned that the area became known as "Dead Man's Stretch". There have been reports of ghostly "apparitions" in the area, particularly of a white dog.

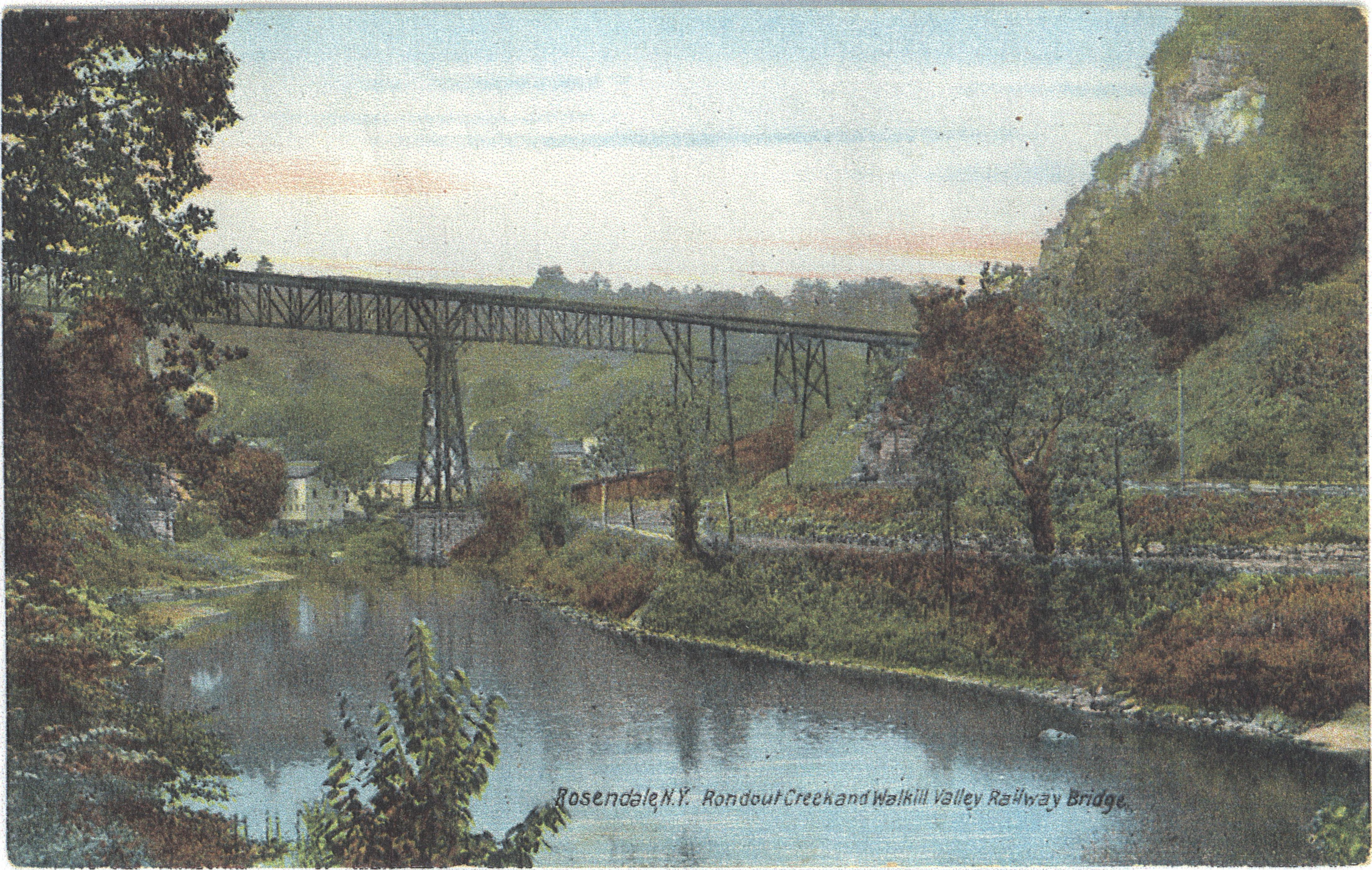
The trestle, spanning the former Delaware and Hudson Canal, as well as Rondout Creek

The bridge was rebuilt by the King Bridge Company between 1895 and 1896, remaining in use most of the time; the trestle is the only railroad bridge featured in the King Bridge Company catalogs of the 1880s and 1890s that remains standing. The renovation converted the bridge's structure from iron and wood to steel to allay public concerns about its strength; the height of the bridge evoked collapses such as the Tay Bridge disaster. The steel was provided by the Carnegie Steel Company. The renovation raised the bridge's piers by 8 feet (2.4 m) and made the bridge straighter; the original design had a curve on its southern end. One of the northern spans was completed by February, 1896, and the entire reconstruction was finished by June. The layout of the spans was unchanged from the original 1872 design. Following its reconstruction, the bridge was unaffected by the shock of a large cave-in at a nearby Rosendale cement quarry on December 26, 1899, though it was shaken by a nearby boiler explosion that occurred days before the collapse.

From the time of its reconstruction to its eventual closure, passengers continued to have concerns over the trestle. The "speed, weight, and positioning of rolling stock on the bridge" was monitored, and it was repeatedly reinforced to "carry the ever heavier loads of modern railroading". In the 1940s, steam engines carrying heavy loads over the bridge caused the catwalk on the west side of the bridge to shake. By 1975, the rail line had deteriorated to the point where federal regulations allowed only 8-mile-per-hour (13 km/h) traffic over the trestle, though engineers were instructed to go no faster than 5 miles per hour (8.0 km/h). The sturdiness of the bridge, specifically the stability of its piers, was a deciding factor when Conrail (then-owner of the Wallkill Valley rail line) closed its Wallkill Valley Branch on December 31, 1977.

=== Modern use ===
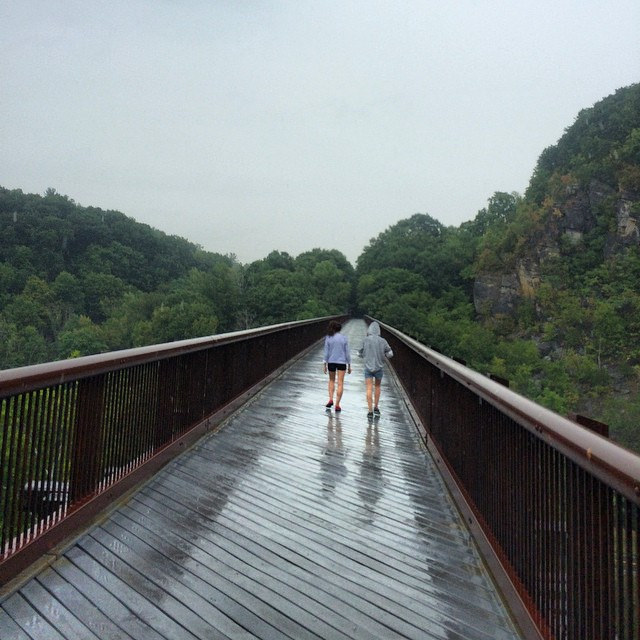
Hikers on the re-opened trestle

Conrail had begun taking bids on the trestle as early as 1983. An initial offer was made to the town of Rosendale, which refused: unwilling to accept the liability. Conrail sold the bridge, along with 11.5 miles (18.5 km) of the Wallkill Valley rail corridor, in 1986 to a private businessman, John E. Rahl, for one dollar. Rahl took title of the trestle and corridor on July 11, 1986. Included in Rahl's purchase was a train station in Rosendale's hamlet of Binnewater; the station was a part of the Binnewater Historic District. A Rosendale homeowner association had tried to purchase the properties before Rahl, also for one dollar, but Conrail declined their offer.

Rahl, born around 1948 in Washingtonville, was a construction worker and auto mechanic. He lived near the trestle, in a "converted warehouse, whose support beams had once formed the scaffolding for the trestle crews". Rahl's reason for buying the rail line was originally to open a "dining car restaurant" along the corridor, and to establish a tourist railroad from Kingston to the trestle. He claimed the purchase granted him the right to "restore rail service on the whole Wallkill line", and also joint ownership of Conrail: an incredible assertion which did not prevail. Plans to restore service subsequently "didn't pan out". Within one year of the purchase, Rahl sold 11 acres (4.5 ha) of the property to a housing developer. On May 16, 1989, a storm caused such severe damage to the Binnewater station that part of it broke-off and fell into the road; the building was subsequently demolished by the town of Rosendale's highway department.

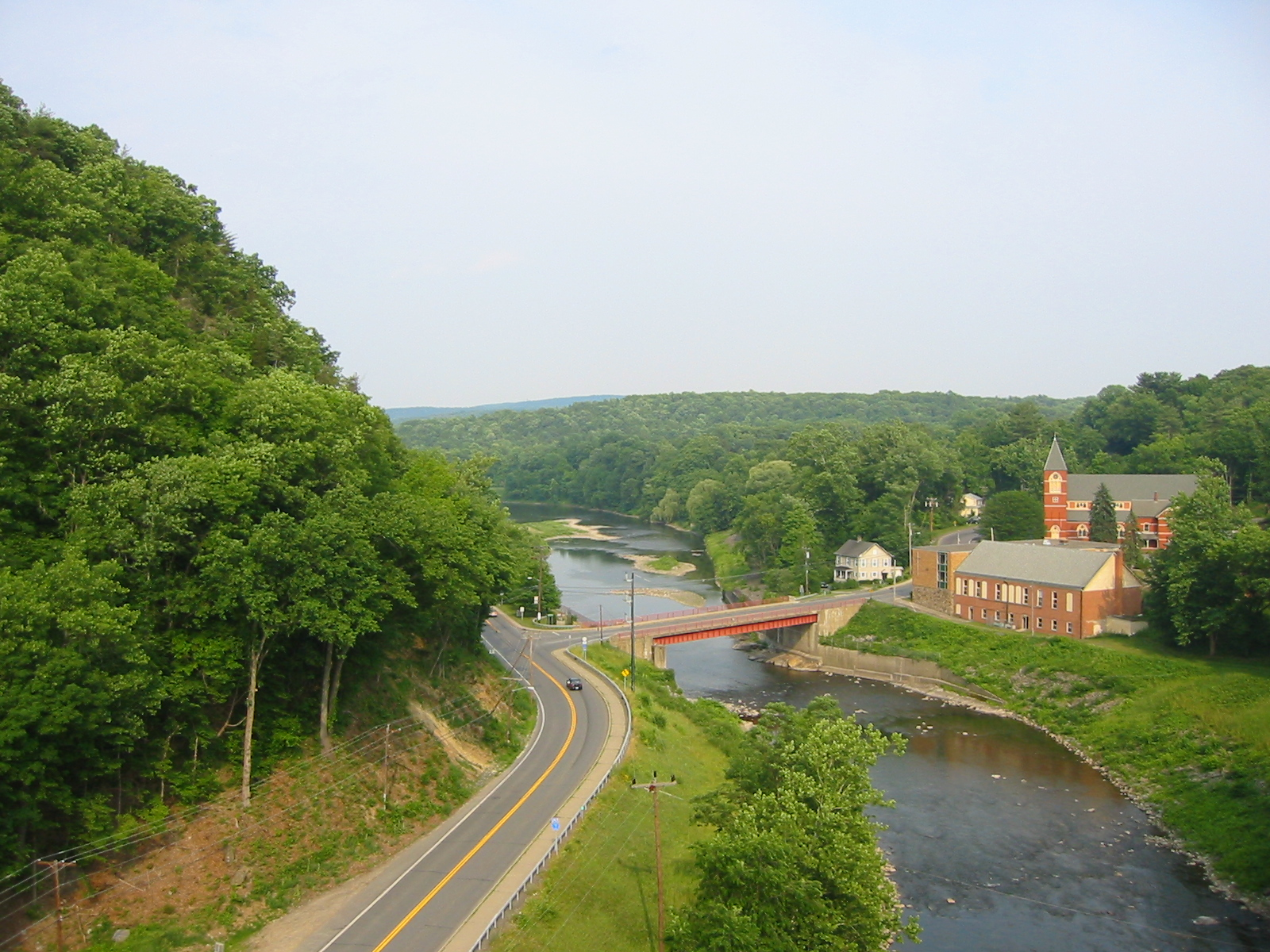
View from the trestle of Joppenbergh Mountain (left), NY 213 (center), and Rondout Creek (right)

Between 1989 and 1991, Rahl installed planking and guard rails on the southern half of the bridge, which was then opened to the public. He allowed bungee jumping off the bridge until a January, 1992 court order held that it violated zoning laws. One person tried to execute a bungee jump off the bridge without a restraining cord. The bridge was slightly damaged by a fire in mid-1999, but it was repaired by September of that year.

Douglas Hase, an entrepreneur who had run bungee-jumping and hot air ballooning companies, tried unsuccessfully in 2003 and 2004 to get a variance for another bungee-jumping venture. During a public hearing about Hase's proposal, a county legislator began screaming to simulate the sound neighbours would hear repetitively when people jumped off the bridge.

After Rahl failed to pay $13,716 in property taxes over a period of three years, Ulster County foreclosed on the entire 63.34-acre (25.63 ha) property on April 15, 2009. The Wallkill Valley Land Trust and Open Space Conservancy offered to purchase the property, and the county authorized the sale in July 2009. The sale was completed in late August, 2009. The Land Trust agreed to pay all outstanding taxes before receiving full ownership and adding it to the Wallkill Valley Rail Trail. Ownership of the trestle was then transferred to the Wallkill Valley Rail Trail Association.

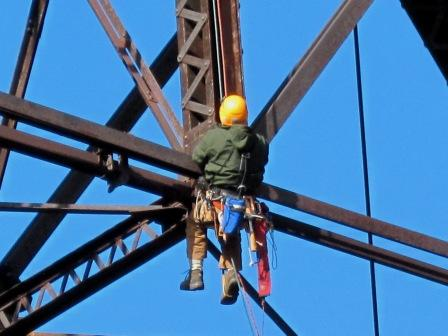
An engineer from Bergmann Associates surveying the trestle in late 2010

Following an engineering survey by Bergmann Associates, of Albany, NY – the same firm that inspected the Poughkeepsie Bridge prior to its conversion to a walkway – the bridge was closed to the public in June 2010, for repairs. Renovations were originally expected to cost $750,000, and begin in early 2011 with a 12-month completion time. The New York State Office of Parks, Recreation and Historic Preservation granted $150,000 toward the renovation. By November 2010, an additional $300,000 had been raised from private donors and other sources. By the end of 2010, over 10 1/2 short tons (9.5 t) of ties were removed from the Rosendale section of the rail trail.

The surface of the walkway was rebuilt with a wood-plastic composite by a volunteer force. On February 17, 2011, a Bergmann Associates employee used the trestle as a case study in a seminar on adaptive reuse of defunct railroad bridges. By late March, 2011, the estimated cost of renovating the trestle had risen to $1.1 million, and the expected time to completion had increased to two years.

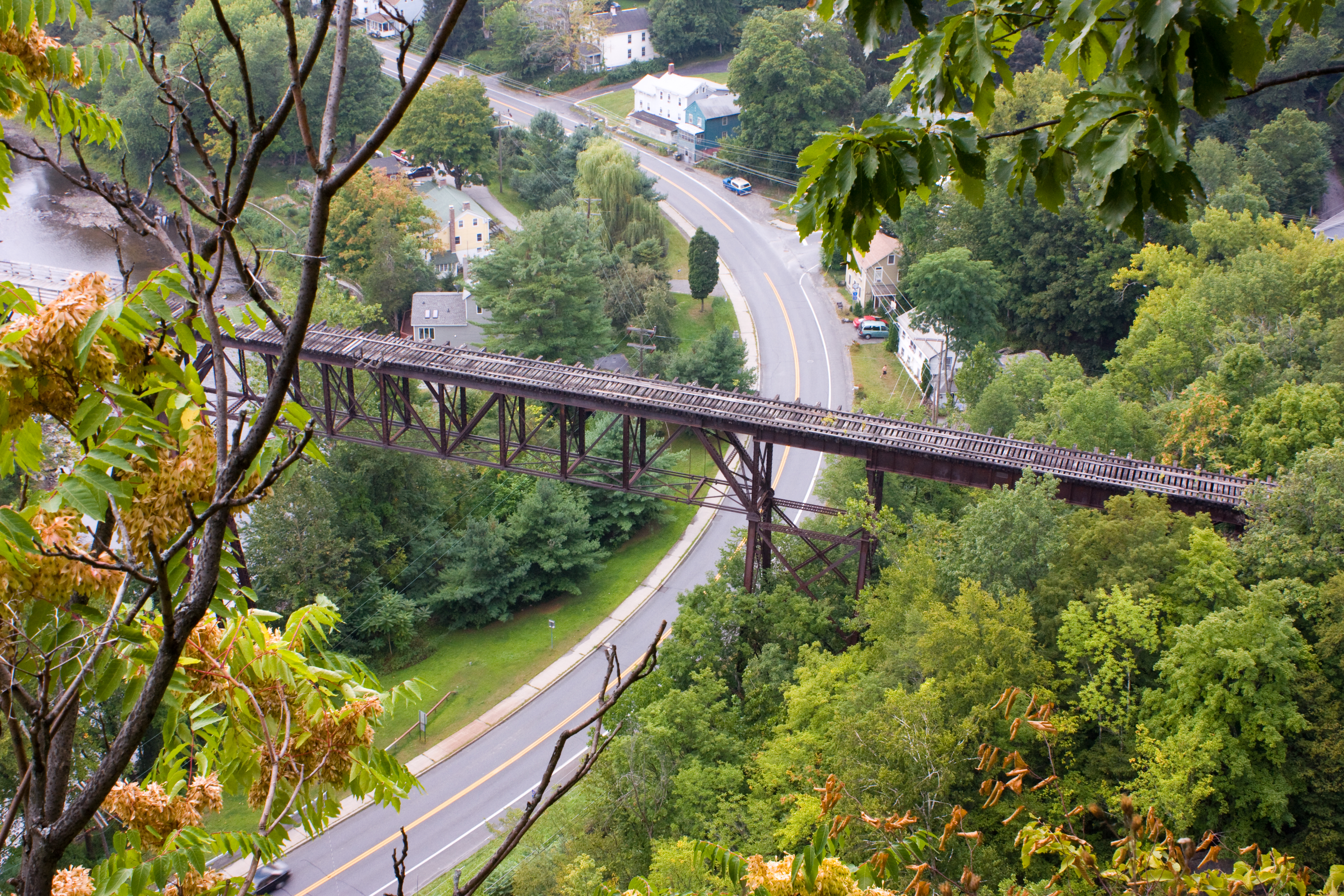
The northern half of the trestle in 2008, without decking or guard rails

A campaign to raise $500,000 for the renovation began on March 27, 2011; by June 30, about $50,000 had been raised. Two 2009 lawsuits brought by John E. Rahl against the New York Telephone Company over alleged fees due to him for a fiber optic line crossing the trestle were dismissed by two lower courts (in Vermont and New York). On November 18, 2011, the US Court of Appeals for the Second Circuit dismissed Rahl's appeal. Following July 2011, a lawsuit brought by John E. Rahl over the ownership of the trestle was also dismissed by the Second Circuit U.S. Court of Appeals. Rahl had claimed that he retained ownership of the property because only the state, and not the county, had the right to seize the trestle, which was "forever railroad under 19th century eminent domain legal doctrines – long forgotten by modern jurisprudence". The trestle has been the site of numerous picnics, barbecues and at least one wedding.

In late June 2012, contractors began welding new railings to the trestle and conducting other preparatory work for opening the walkway. An event at nearby Willow Kiln Park was held on June 29, 2013, to celebrate the grand-opening of the trestle to the public. The trestle was fully re-opened to the public for the first time since the rail line closed, and a 24-mile-long (39 km) segment of the Wallkill Valley Rail Trail from Gardiner to Kingston was opened.

== See also ==
- List of crossings of Rondout Creek

== Bibliography ==
- Best, Gerald M. (1972). The Ulster And Delaware: Railroad Through The Catskills (5th ed.). San Marino, CA: Golden West Books. ISBN 978-0-87095-041-4.
- Chazin, Daniel D. (2001). New York Walk Book: A Companion to the New Jersey Walk Book (7th ed.). Mahwah, NJ: New York–New Jersey Trail Conference. ISBN 978-1-880775-30-1.
- Genero, Peter P. (2005). Thank Rosendale: New York – The Empire State. Fort Pierce, FL: Genero Inc. ISBN 978-0-9759419-1-1.
- Gilchrist, Ann (1976). Footsteps Across Cement: A History of the Township of Rosendale, New York. Woodstock, NY: Lith Art. OCLC 2597851.
- Mabee, Carleton (1995). Listen to the Whistle: An Anecdotal History of the Wallkill Valley Railroad. Fleishmanns, NY: Purple Mountain Press. ISBN 978-0-935796-69-8.
- Penna, Craig Della; Sexton, Tom (2002). The Official Rails-to-Trails Conservancy Guidebook. Guilford, CT: Globe Pequot Press. ISBN 978-0-7627-0450-7.
- Sylvester, Nathaniel Bartlett (1880). History of Ulster County, New York, with Illustrations and Biographical Sketches of its Prominent Men and Pioneers: Part Second: History of the Towns of Ulster County. Philadelphia, PA: Everts & Peck. OCLC 2385957.
