= Snyder Estate Natural Cement Historic District =

Historic district in New York, United States

- Snyder Estate Natural Cement; Historic District
- U.S. National Register of Historic Places
- U.S. Historic district
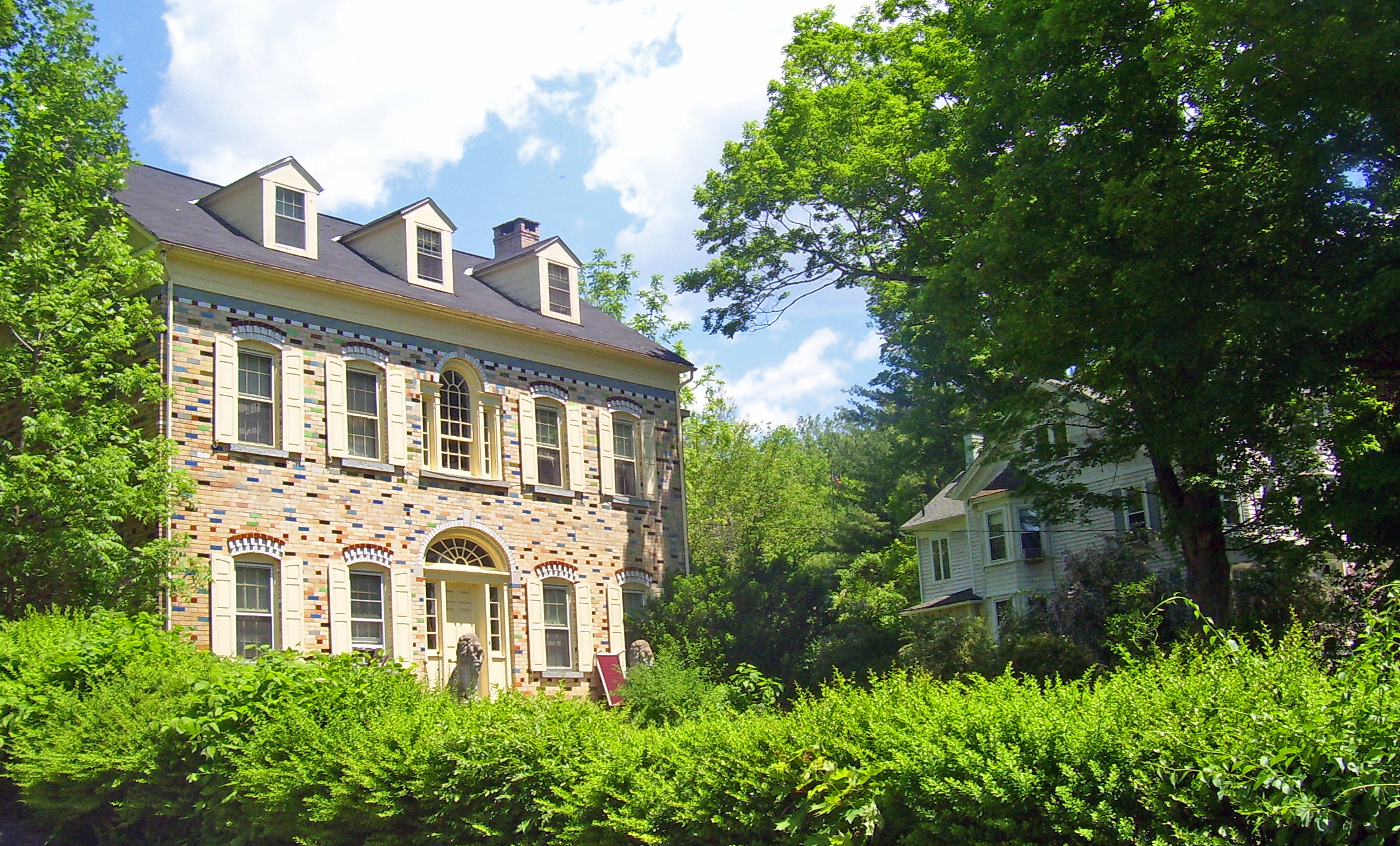
- Houses of Andrew (left) and Charles Snyder along Route 213, 2008

- Location within New York Location within the United States
- Location: Rosendale, NY
- Nearest city: Kingston
- Coordinates: 41°50′50″N 74°05′52″W
- Area: 275 acres (111 ha)
- Built: 1825-1958
- Architectural style: Federal
- NRHP reference No.: 92000695
- Added to NRHP: 1992

The Snyder Estate Natural Cement Historic District is located in the Town of Rosendale, New York, United States. It is a 275-acre (111 ha) tract roughly bounded by Rondout Creek, Binnewater and Cottekill roads and Sawdust Avenue. NY 213 runs through the lower portion of the district, paralleling the dry bed of the Delaware and Hudson Canal.

Within the district's bounds are 122 contributing properties representing what remains of five plants that produced Rosendale cement, and the homes and dependencies of the Snyder family, who originally owned the land. They range in age from the bed of the canal, where the cement was discovered in 1825 during construction, to some of the last factories built before production was ended in 1970. Included are not just homes, barns, and factories but mines, reservoirs, and a rail siding. After an aborted attempt to secure National Historic Landmark District status in 1978, the district was added to the National Register of Historic Places in 1992.

== Geography ==
The district is shaped like a letter "r", solidly bounded by the roads and creek on three of its sides, but with its eastern boundary mostly following old roads between Route 213, Binnewater road and Sawdust avenue. Physically, it is dominated by two large hills, foothills of the Shawangunk Ridge to the south, which rise to over 300 feet (91 m) in elevation, more than 200 feet (61 m) above the creek's waters to the south.

Between them in a narrow valley sit the remains of one of the largest cement plants in it. An old Wallkill Valley Railroad siding runs from there to the northeast corner near where it once joined the main line at today's Binnewater Historic District. Old mines and quarries are tunneled into the sides of both hills.

The property is mostly wooded save for the developed areas. Some of the areas along the road are old fields, today meadows.

== History ==
Natural cement production began almost immediately after its discovery inside district bounds by James McEntee, an engineer on the D&H canal construction project in 1825. Production peaked by the end of the 19th century at about 4,000,000 barrels per year. Demand for natural cement fell during the 20th century due to competitive pressure from Portland cement. The final cement company closed its operations in 1970 after a valiant attempt to survive mounted by A. J. Snyder.

=== 19th century ===
The Snyder family owned and farmed the property since 1755. In 1809, Christopher and Deborah Snyder commissioned for their newlywed son, Jacob Lowe Snyder, a house with an accompanying gristmill on the creek. Known today as the Century House, it is the oldest extant building in the district whose age is precisely known.

In 1825, Jacob ceded a portion of his land to John B. Jervis of the Delaware and Hudson Canal Company so that a canal could be built across the property. As a condition of building the canal, Jacob required the company to build him a slip so he could ship his produce to market, and a bridge to reach his mill. Crews excavating the area a short while later found large deposits of dolostone containing an ideal amount of clay minerals that, once pulverized and mixed, could be turned into natural cement without additives.

The company set up production facilities almost immediately, as similar cement was used to construct the Erie Canal. The presence of dolomite meant the canal could be built using this new cement and guaranteed another customer beside the anthracite coal miners the canal was built to serve. In 1830, Snyder leased the southeastern corner of his property to Watson Lawrence. Lawrence had already built a cement plant on adjacent land. Other mines and cement plants opened up in the 32-square-mile (83 km^{2}) area along the Rondout as well, creating a vibrant local industry.

Snyder reinvested much of the Lawrence Cement Company's profits in improving its technical quality. He courted buyers for large, high-profile government projects like New York City's Croton Aqueduct and the Brooklyn Navy Yard docks. This helped create a reputation for quality that unwittingly resulted "Rosendale cement" becoming a generic term for any natural cement, regardless of where it was produced. The popularity ultimately strained the company's finances to the point of failure; the company closed in 1858.

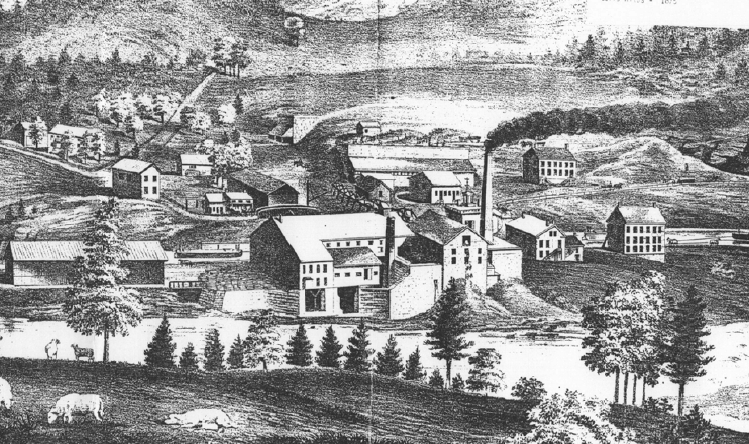
The Lawrenceville Cement plant, ca. 1875

Lawrence retained control of the new Lawrenceville Cement Company, but was ousted after three years when William Beach took over. Beach expanded the production facilities, in time for the rise in demand that occurred as the Gilded Age saw a rapid increase in demand after the lull caused by the Civil War. Beach died in 1881; control soon passed to his son William N. Beach II.

The younger Beach took advantage of the recently constructed Wallkill Valley Railroad and its connections to the New York Central network as a way to get product to market, building a siding to the plant. In keeping with a general national trend, this began a shift away from the canal that had spawned the cement works, and within two decades the canal would carry its last loads.

=== 20th century ===
As the century ended, the natural-cement industry dominated the market. The Snyder family was proud that their cement had been used in the Brooklyn Bridge, an icon of the era. Beach built another new plant in the northeast corner of the property to handle demand. But the development of the cheaper Portland cement during that period eventually toppled the Rosendale variety, whose market share dropped 90% in the first decade of the 20th century. Local industrial magnate Samuel Coykendall eventually tried to salvage the Rosendale industry through mergers, combining all the local companies save the ones on the Snyder property into one. The Consolidated Rosendale Cement Company was no more successful than any of its component companies had been, and was in receivership by 1918.

In 1911 an Ulster County court had forced the sale of the Snyder company from William Snyder to 21-year-old Andrew J. Snyder II after a disagreement over the sharing of profits. The younger Snyder dismantled one of the larger plants and built a smaller one in its place. He was able to continue production on a reduced scale through the 1920s, and later in that decade attracted the interest of an investor from Cleveland named Kling, who leased a portion of the property from Snyder and started the Interstate Cement Company.

The Great Depression soon put an end to that venture, and by 1935 it had become the Century Cement Manufacturing Co., wholly owned by Snyder. He was able to keep the company going through the later 1930s when he allowed mushroom growers to set up shop in the abandoned Beach Mine. Eventually, that would produce five tons (4.5 tonnes) per day before it stopped in 1960.

At the same time he also took advantage of a discovery that Portland cement could be made even more quickly and last longer when combined with natural cement in an 80:20 ratio. This blend was particularly suited to highways, then being built at a great pace everywhere due to the combination of New Deal public works projects and increasing automobile use. By the start of World War II production was again on the increase.

It fell during the war years but rebounded afterward to even higher levels as highway construction picked up again with the development of the Interstate Highway System. In 1954 Rosendale cement was used for the nearby sections of the New York State Thruway. However, it would be the last major public project in which it was used.

Snyder had been exploring the possibilities of making Portland cement as well. Geologists found that there were significant reserves in the Hudson Valley of the type of limestone needed, so in 1958 the company bought a plant from the Swiss company Van Roll. Three years later it was built next to the existing facilities and began turning out cement. Around the same time, chemists developed an additive to Portland cement which eliminated the need for the Rosendale mix, and cut costs even further.

Snyder and the company's technical team tried to keep up with the changes, but they were as old as he was and had trouble getting the formula right. The market for the natural cement the property still produced was almost negligible, and in 1970 Snyder finally halted production almost a century and a half after Rosendale cement had first been discovered on the bed of the long-abandoned canal. He himself died five years later

== Preservation ==
Recognizing its historic importance not just to the region but the country as a whole, two staffers at the American Association for State and Local History prepared an application to have the district designated a National Historic Landmark in 1978 that was never completed. The Century House Historical Society (CHHS) acquired the 19 acres (7.7 ha) around the eponymous 1809 building where Jacob Lowe Snyder lived at the time of the canal's construction. It was chartered provisionally in 1992 and fully in 2000. It runs the property as a museum devoted to both the house and the American natural cement industry.

In the plant's last years, one of the few markets it had left was the restoration of historic buildings that had originally used it or similar materials. The factory's closure left those builders without any source of authentic material. In 2004 Edison Coatings, Inc., of Plainville, Connecticut, trademarked the brand Rosendale Natural Cement Products and began offering an authentic, historically accurate replacement.

== Significant contributing properties ==
Several of the many contributing resources to the district are notable in their own right. None have yet been separately listed on the Register, save the sections of canal bed, a National Historic Landmark.

The Century House Historical Society(CHHS) operates the site as a museum that is open to the public on Sunday afternoons in the summer season. The museum is also known as the "Century House Historical Society Museum" and the "Snyder Estate Museum".

=== Century House ===
Jacob Lowe Snyder's 1809 frame house, renovated in the 1940s, is the core of the CHHS property and the oldest building in the district.

The house features the Cement Industry Museum, with artifacts and photographs from the Rosendale cement industry. Rosendale Natural Cement was used in the building of many historic buildings and structures, including the Brooklyn Bridge, the pedestal of the Statue of Liberty, the wings of the U.S. Capitol, the Washington Monument, Grand Central Terminal, the Croton Aqueduct, the Empire State Building (foundation) and dams and many other public works projects. There is also a display of horse-drawn carriages and sleighs.

=== Andrew J. Snyder I House ===
Known also as the Ceramic Brick House. Originally built in 1887 as a Second Empire-style mansion complete with mansard roof, in 1950 the windows and roof were converted to a more standard gable with dormers. It was also refaced in polychrome glazed brick imported from Leeds. This drastic exterior redesign did not cost the house its historic status as its original framing and interior layout remain intact.

=== Canal infrastructure ===
In addition to the canal bed, other aspects of the canal remain within the district. There is a waste weir next to it, and just west of Binnewater Road is a reservoir that was used to keep the canal full during dry stretches. The slip that the company built for Snyder is also intact, and is possibly the only remaining slip from the original construction along the entire length of the former canal.

=== Widow Jane Mine ===
Widow Jane Mine, a drift mine into one of the hillsides, is the oldest cement mine on the property. It was constructed using the room and pillar technique, where pillars of dolomite have been left to support the overlying rock. The largest of the mines, it has been likened to an underground pillared room. The deep mining operations are mostly flooded with groundwater, but the room and pillar entrance is available for visitors. Frequent events taking advantage of the unique acoustics are hosted in the summer.
