= Wallkill Valley Railroad =

Railroad in New York State (1866–1977)

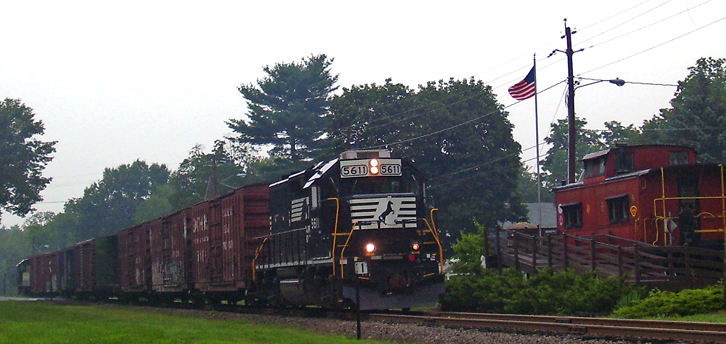
- A Norfolk Southern freight train near the southern end of the former Wallkill Valley Railroad in Campbell Hall in 2006.

Overview
- Locale: upstate New York, United States
- Dates of operation: 1866–1977
- Successor: Conrail

Technical
- Track gauge: 4 ft 8 1/2 in (1,435 mm)

The Wallkill Valley Railroad is a defunct railroad which once operated in Ulster and Orange counties in upstate New York. Its corridor was from Kingston in the north to Montgomery in the south, with a leased extension to Campbell Hall. It crossed both the Wallkill River and Rondout Creek.

The railroad was founded in 1866 and ceased regular service in 1977. It was owned by a number of companies, including the West Shore and New York Central railroads, as well as Conrail. After its closure, portions of the rail bed were purchased by municipalities along the corridor and converted to rail trails.

== History ==
=== Wallkill Valley Railroad ===
The Wallkill Valley Railway was founded in 1866, and was constructed to match the Erie Railroad's six-foot gauge so that it would be easier to transport goods from one railroad to the other. It was operated by the Erie for the next ten years after its construction. It came to New Paltz in 1870, and bridged Rondout Creek and the Delaware and Hudson Canal in 1872. That year, steamboat Captain Thomas Cornell became president of the railroad, though people thought that he bought the railroad just for his own sake. He completed it to Kingston, but left his post soon thereafter. Newspaper articles suggested that it was a financial scandal, and the Wallkill Valley went bankrupt.

However, Cornell purchased it again in 1877, with the name being amended to the Wallkill Valley Railroad. He learned later, with the help of his son-in-law Samuel Decker Coykendall, that the West Shore Railroad was chartering a route to New York City and that the new route would pass through Kingston on the way. Cornell responded by chartering an extension for the Wallkill Valley right into West Shore-chartered land. What this meant to the West Shore was that it could have a new branch. The West Shore purchased the line at a price of almost $1,000,000 in 1881.

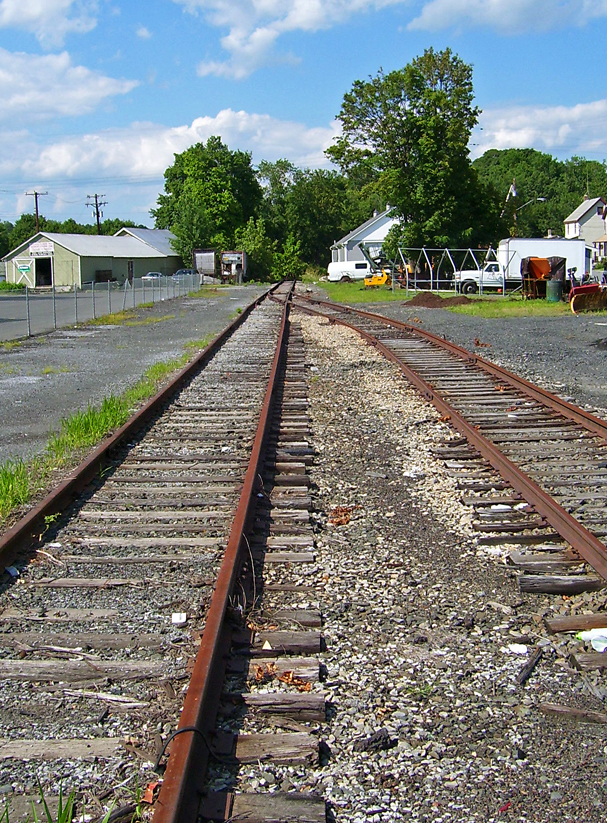
The northern end of the remaining Wallkill Valley Railroad tracks, in Walden

=== New York Central ===
The line soon became the rural Wallkill Valley Branch of the West Shore Railroad, although the locals whose profits were wiped out during the previous bankruptcy did not agree with this. An occasional scheme was hatched to extend it to the Pennsylvania coal mines to bring more money to the railroad, though it was never successful. The New York Central then bought the West Shore Railroad in 1884 when passenger service was slowly declining, as with other rural branches. The southern terminus of the railroad was at Montgomery. The service from Montgomery to Campbell Hall was the beginning of the Erie Railroad's route from Montgomery to Erie's mainline at Goshen. Passenger service was completely abandoned in 1937.

After the abandonment of passenger service some of the former Ulster and Delaware locomotives were sent to operate on the Wallkill Valley Branch, since they were light enough to cross the Wallkill Valley's Rosendale Bridge. Those locomotives were all gone by 1949 and the branch was entirely dieselized, together with the NYC's Catskill Mountain Branch.

=== Conrail ===
Conrail almost entirely abandoned the branch, though it was considered briefly as a new route to Allentown, Pennsylvania, via Kingston, Campbell Hall and the Lehigh and Hudson River Railway. It was discovered in 1977 that the piers supporting the Rosendale Viaduct had shifted, and that repairs were not worth the money to keep the line open. The physical plant was formally abandoned in 1982, and the infrastructure was torn out and sold for scrap, except for the Rosendale trestle; a little spur from Walden to Campbell Hall and a team track in Kingston. The process of dismantling the railroad took from 1983 to 1984.

=== Norfolk Southern Railway and remaining facilities ===
The remaining spur from DeGroodt's Paving in downtown Walden to the Campbell Hall Metro-North station is used for freight service by Norfolk Southern. The station in New Paltz remains along the trail, though the station in Gardiner burned down in 2002. Walden station was moved to a village park, and remains intact. The Middletown and New Jersey Railroad currently provides freight service on the line.

== Rail trails ==
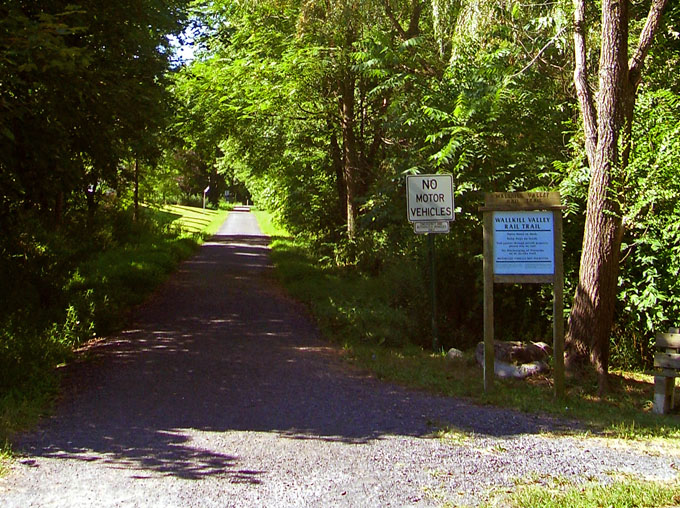
The Wallkill Valley Rail Trail in New Paltz

Portions of the line in both Ulster and Orange Counties have been converted into rail trails, described here from north to south. Note that north of River Road in Rosendale, the Wallkill Valley Railroad actually runs in the Rondout Valley.

The Wallkill Valley Rail Trail runs 12.2 miles (19.6 km) from Gardiner through New Paltz to Rosendale. The addition of an 11.5-mile (18.5 km) section in 2009 extended it farther north to Kingston.

The Walden–Wallkill Rail Trail has been paved and runs from NY 208 in Wallkill south to Walden, NY, in Orange County. Parking availability is limited to street parking. The section of the rail bed north of Rte 208 to Birch Road is owned by the Town of Shawangunk but is unimproved. The 1.4 mile section from Birch Road north to Denniston road (southern terminus of the Wallkill Valley Rail Trail) is owned by the New York State Department of Corrections where the Shawangunk Correctional Facility and Wallkill Correctional Facility are located. This section is closed to the public.

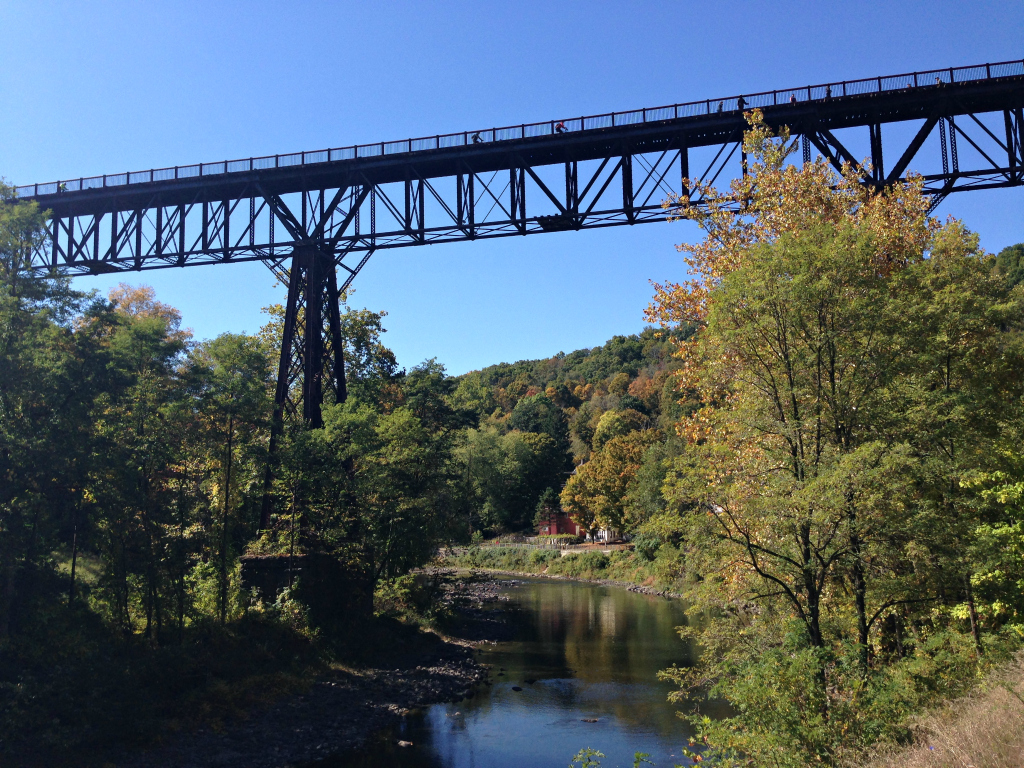
Rosendale Trestle Wallkill Valley Rail Trail

== Stations ==
- Kingston Union Station
- Binnewater
- Rosendale
- New Paltz
- Gardiner
- Wallkill
- Walden
- Montgomery (Connection with Erie Railroad)
- Campbell Hall
- Goshen
