= Shawangunk Correctional Facility =

Maximum-security state prison for male prisoners, located in New York, US

Coordinates: 41°38′06″N 74°09′50″W

- Interactive map of Shawangunk Correctional Facility
- Location: 200 Quick Road Wallkill, New York
- Status: Operational
- Security class: Maximum
- Capacity: 558
- Opened: 1983
- Managed by: New York State Department of Corrections and Community Supervision

Shawangunk Correctional Facility is a maximum security prison for males located in the Town of Shawangunk, Ulster County, New York in the United States. The facility lies just outside the Ulster County hamlet of Wallkill.

== History ==
The prison was constructed in 1983 to expand the maximum-security capabilities of the state prison system and is located near the existing Wallkill Correctional Facility, a medium security prison. The co-location was designed so that services by both facilities could be shared, thus reducing the costs of each prison.

The new prison opened in 1985 and was fully operational by 1986. Participation in vocational programs at Shawangunk was the highest of any prison, as reported by the Correctional Association of New York. In addition to college courses and library access, Shawangunk offers four vocational courses: carpentry, computer operator, general business and print shop.

== Notable inmates ==
- David Berkowitz, serial killer better known as "Son of Sam", who murdered 6 people and injured 11 others in New York City between 1975 and 1977. Serving a life sentence, he has been denied parole multiple times.
- Santino Boderick, member of GS9, sentenced in 2017 to 117.5-130 years after being convicted of gang-related violence, including attempted murder, that took place in Brooklyn, New York between January 2013 and December 2014.
- Robert Chambers, who pled guilty to the manslaughter of Jennifer Levin and served a sentence of 15 years; after release he was convicted of drug crimes, for which he eventually received a new sentence of 19 years. Chambers was released from the facility in July 2023.
- Larry Davis, tried for the attempted murder of a police officer and acquitted by pleading self-defense; later convicted in an unrelated murder of a drug dealer and sentenced to 25 years-to-life; died in prison in a stabbing by a fellow inmate.
- David Gilbert, member of the radical Weather Underground Organization; sentenced in 1983 to 75 years-to-life (later commuted to 40-to-life) on three counts of felony murder in the 1981 Brinks robbery. Paroled, 2021.
- Craig Godineaux, co-perpetrator of the Wendy's massacre; sentenced to life in prison without parole.
