= Binnewater Historic District =

Historic district in New York, United States

- U.S. National Register of Historic Places
- U.S. Historic district
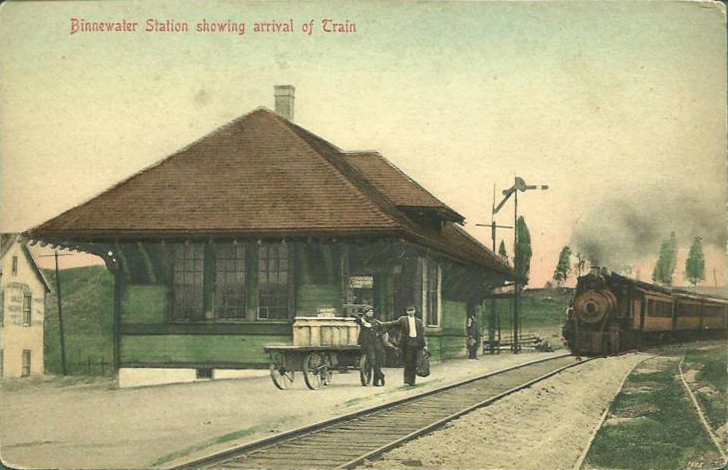
- The Binnewater railroad station, once part of the historic district

- Location within New York Location within the United States
- Location: Sawdust Ave., Breezy Hill and Binnewater Rds., Rosendale, New York
- Coordinates: 41°51′27″N 74°5′10″W
- Area: 6.7 acres (2.7 ha)
- Built: 1872
- NRHP reference No.: 82001272
- Added to NRHP: November 4, 1982

The Binnewater Historic District is a national historic district located at Rosendale in Ulster County, New York, United States. The district originally included nine contributing buildings built during the late 19th and early 20th centuries. They were all frame structures and included a railroad depot, a privy, a general store that was also a post office, a livery stable, two houses, a wagon shed, and two barns. The general store served as an unofficial railroad depot for the Wallkill Valley Railroad from 1875 until 1883, when the railroad constructed the actual station. The station was located too close to Binnewater Road, and was hit repeatedly by trucks. In May 1989, a large piece of the building broke off and fell into the street. The structure was subsequently demolished.

The district was listed on the National Register of Historic Places in 1982.

Binnewater is known for its many lakes, including Williams Lake, Twin Lakes, and Fourth Lake. Williams Lake used to house Williams Lake Resort. This Resort included a hotel, a restaurant that was open to hotel guests and the public, and a private beach club membership.

== Bibliography ==
- Mabee, Carleton (1995). Listen to the Whistle: An Anecdotal History of the Wallkill Valley Railroad. Fleishmanns, NY: Purple Mountain Press. ISBN 0-935796-69-X.
