= Esopus =

Esopus may refer to:

In New York

- Esopus, New York, a town in Ulster County
  - Esopus (village), in the town of Esopus
- Esopus Creek, a tributary of the Hudson River
- Esopus Meadows Lighthouse, a lighthouse on the Hudson River near Esopus, New York
- Esopus Wars, two localized conflicts between Dutch settlers and the Esopus tribe of Lenape native people during the latter half of the 17th century
- Esopus (magazine), a nonprofit arts publication based in New York
- Esopus people, a tribe of Lenape native people
- Esopus Spitzenburg, a type of apple

Other

- Esopus (crab), a genus of crabs in the family Epialtidae
- A medieval spelling of Aesop
