= Ulster County Area Transit =

Bus transport operator in Ulster County, New York,

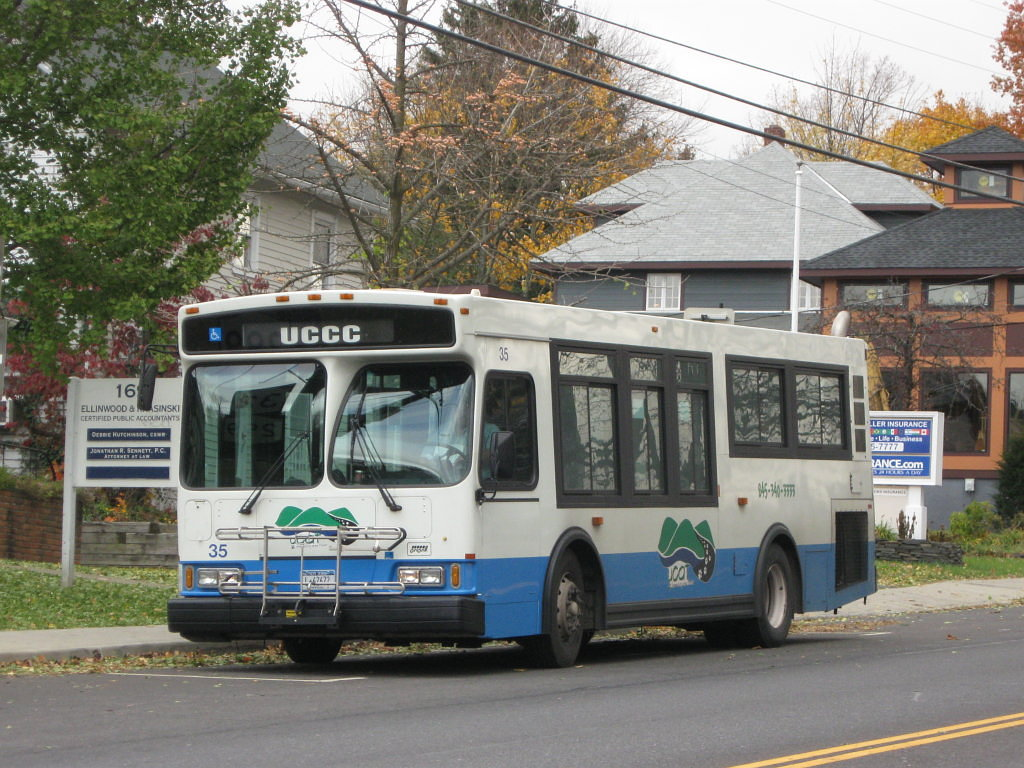
- UCAT #35 lays over in New Paltz.
- Headquarters: 1 Danny Circle; Kingston, NY 12401
- Locale: Ulster County, New York
- Service area: Ulster County, New York
- Service type: Fixed-route, deviated fixed-route, commuter
- Hubs: 3 (New Paltz, UCCC, and Kingston)
- Fleet: 30
- Daily ridership: 1224 (weekday); 219 (Saturday); 52 (Sunday)
- Fuel type: Diesel; Diesel-electric hybrid (most newer buses); Gasoline (cutaways)
- Chief executive: Toni Roser
- Website: Ulster County Area Transit

Ulster County Area Transit (UCAT) is the county-owned operator of bus transportation in Ulster County, New York, providing fixed-route, deviated-fixed route, and commuter transit.

== Service area ==
UCAT provides service primarily in the corridors of the major state and U.S. highways traversing Ulster County, servicing primarily the U.S. Route 209, Route 28, Route 32, U.S. Route 9W and Route 299 corridors. Service is also provided out of the county to Poughkeepsie and Newburgh for connections with Metro-North Railroad at Poughkeepsie, and Short Line Bus in Newburgh and Ellenville. Within Ulster County, connections are available to Trailways of New York inter-city and commuter services to both New York City and Albany.

== Routes ==
All routes except the Nature Bus are operated by UCAT. The two Nature Bus routes are operated by Ulster County.

=== Route list ===
Route	Termini		via	Notes
Belleayre Express	Kingston; Kingston Plaza	Pine Hill; Belleayre Mountain	NY-28	Seasonal express bus from Kingston to Belleayre Mountain, runs December to April. Operates weekends only.
Blue	Kingston Development Court	Kingston; Delaware Av & North St	Broadway	Ex-Kingston Citibus route, circulator through Kingston. Operates Mon-Sat.
CL	Kingston; Development Court	New Paltz; SUNY New Paltz	NY-213, NY-32, SUNY Ulster	Routing on each trip varies. Operates Mon-Fri.
E	Kingston; Development Court	Ellenville; Liberty Sq	US-209, SUNY Ulster	Operates Mon-Sat.
KS	Kingston; Development Court	Saugerties; Price Chopper	US-9W, Hudson Valley Mall	Operates Mon-Sat.
KPL	Kingston; Development Court	Poughkeepsie; Metro-North Station	US-9W, Mid-Hudson Bridge	Operates Mon-Sun. Sunday service combined with the UPL.
UPL	New Paltz; NY-32 & DuBois Dr	Poughkeepsie; Metro-North Station	NY-299, Mid-Hudson Bridge	Two trips per day continue to Rosendale and Kingston. Operates Mon-Sun. Sunday service combined with the KPL.
Mall Loop	Loop through Hudson Valley Mall		Hudson Valley Mall	Operates Mon-Fri.
NPL	Loop through New Paltz		Main St, SUNY New Paltz	Operates midday on Tuesdays and Saturdays.
Port Ewen Loop	Kingston; Development Court	Port Ewen Birches Apartments	Broadway, US-9W	Operates midday on Tuesdays and Thursdays.
X	Kingston; Development Court	Newburgh; Newburgh Mall	NY-32	Operates Mon-Fri. The last trip of the day ends in New Paltz. Some trips also serve Wallkill.
Yellow	Kingston; Kingston Plaza	Kingston Kingston Inn & Forest Hill Dr	Broadway	Ex-Kingston Citibus route, circulator through Kingston. Operates Mon-Sat.
Z	Kingston; Kingston Plaza	Pine Hill; Belleayre Mountain	NY-28, Woodstock	Some trips short-turn in Woodstock. Operates Mon-Sat.
Nature Bus - Ridge Route	New Paltz; Exit 18 Park & Ride	Ellenville; Liberty Sq	US-44, Minnewaska State Park, US-209	Operated by Ulster County, operates April to September, every other Saturday.
Nature Bus - River Route	Kingston; Kingston Plaza	Highland; Walkway Over the Hudson	US-9W	Operated by Ulster County, operates April to September, every other Saturday.

=== Former routes ===
Route	Terminals		Via	Fare zones	Notes
E1	Ellenville; Liberty Square	Spring Glen; Old Route 209 and Spring Glen Road	Route 209	Zone 1: Ellenville village; Zone 2: Wawarsing (excluding Ellenville)	All trips continued to/from Route E.; Discontinued on April 1, 2013.
F	Woodstock; NY Route 212 and Rock City Road	Saugerties; Post Office	Route 212	Zone 1: Woodstock; Zone 2: Saugerties	All trips continued to/from Route S.; Discontinued on April 1, 2013.
G	Kingston; Hannaford	Marlboro; St. Mary's Church	Albany Avenue; Broadway; Route 9W	Zone 1: Kingston; Zone 2: Ulster; Zone 3: Esopus; Zone 4: Lloyd; Zone 5: Marlboro	AM trip services Broadway going to Marlboro.; PM trip services Broadway returning to Kingston.; Connections to the Poughkeepsie Metro North Train Station; Renamed Route KPL on October 1, 2015.
H	New Paltz; Trailways terminal	Highland; Bridgeview Plaza	Route 299; New Paltz Road; Route 9W	Zone 1: New Paltz (village and town); Zone 2: Lloyd	Renamed Route UPL on April 1, 2013.
M	Ulster mall circulator		Route 9W; Private mall drives	None	50¢ fare.; Renamed Route MALL on April 1, 2013.
N	SUNY Ulster	Rosendale; Route 32 park-ride	Route 213; Lucas Avenue	Zone 1: Marbletown; Zone 2: Rosendale	Extended to New Paltz and renamed Route CL on April 1, 2013.
T	Kingston Kingston Plaza	Kingston Kingston Inn & Forest Hill Dr	NY-28	None	Discontinued on September 15, 2025, absorbed into the Yellow Route.
New Paltz loop	New Paltz; BOCES		Chestnut Street; Henry DuBois Drive (some trips); SUNY New Paltz	None	Renamed Route NPL on April 1, 2013.

== See also ==
- Trailways of New York, the major private carrier in Ulster County along Routes 28 and 32
