= Esopus (hamlet) =

Esopus, New York
- Hamlet
- Location within New York Location within the United States
- Coordinates: 41.827731°N 73.964994°W
- Country: United States
- State: New York
- County: Ulster
- Time zone: UTC-5 (Eastern (EST))
  - Summer (DST): UTC-4 (EDT)
- ZIP code: 12429
- Area code(s): 845, 329
- GNIS feature ID: 949706

Esopus is a hamlet located in the town of Esopus, in Ulster County, New York. It is located south of Ulster Park on route 9W. Esopus is within the Kingston metro area. The name Esopus comes from the name of the Native American tribe who lived in the area.

== History ==
It was in 1609 when English sailor sailing for the Dutch Henry Hudson sailed up the Hudson River up to Albany. In 1651, what is now the City of Kingston was settled. From September, 1659 to September, 1663; a series of conflicts, known as the Esopus Wars, were fought between the Dutch and the Esopus tribe.

During that time, the tribe sold large tracts of land to French Huguenot refugees in New Paltz. Now, descendants of the Esopus live in Shawano County, Wisconsin. In 1811, the Town of Esopus was established after "separating" from Kingston.

In 1838, Robert Livingston Pell moved into the area and established a farm just north of Esopus. He was one of the first farmers to grow apples and export them to Europe. Also on his farm, they had orchards, vineyards, and ten artificial lakes used for breeding fish. In June 1904 the Redemptorist Fathers purchased 235 acres from the Robert Livingston Pell estate for a House of Studies. In 1907, the large, 444 foot long stone building was finished. It had 220 rooms. The Mount Academy is a high school established in 2012 by the Bruderhof Communities on the site of the former Mount St. Alphonsus, a Redemptorists seminary.

In 2011, the entire Town of Esopus celebrated 200 years since establishment.

== Geography ==
Esopus is located on the west bank of the Hudson River between Kingston and Poughkeepsie. To the north of the hamlet is Ulster Park, to the west are the Marlboro Mountains with the Shaupeneak Ridge Cooperative Recreation Area, and to the south is the hamlet of West Park. Esopus is a basic hamlet and only has 5 streets: 9W runs north-south through the hamlet, Main Street, which used to be the original Broadway/9W until a new section of 9W was built splitting off from Main Street, later to meet again about 1/2 mile down the road, Black Creek Road, Parker Avenue, which connects 9W to Main Street, and Old Post Road, which heads west from Esopus across the Marlboro Mountains. Black Creek empties into the Hudson River in Esopus.

== Demographics ==
As of the 2010 census, 237 people live within the hamlet.

== Special Places/Points of Interests ==
- The Country Store - a deli located on Route 9W
- Frank's Steakhouse - a steakhouse next to the Country Store
- Sacred Heart Church - a small, 19th Century Catholic Church located on Route 9W. Mass is held every Sunday at 8 and 10 and Saturday nights at 5:30
- Esopus Fire House - the largest firehouse in the Town. Department was established in the early 1900s.
