= Marlboro Mountain =

Mountain in New York, United States

- Location within New York Location within the United States

Highest point
- Elevation: 1,115 feet (340 m)
- Coordinates: 41°40′44″N 74°00′44″W

Geography
- Location: Marlboro, New York, U.S.
- Topo map: USGS Clintondale

Marlboro Mountain is a mountain which is the peak of the Marlboro Mountains. Located in the state of New York west of Poughkeepsie. Illinois Mountain is located north of Marlboro Mountain.
