= Joe Langworth =

American dancer (born 1966)

Joe Langworth (born July 19, 1966) is an American theater director, choreographer, casting director, singer and dancer.

== Career ==
From 1990 – 2005, Langworth appeared in a number of major Broadway musicals, including the closing company of the original production of A Chorus Line, the Tony Award-winning production of Ragtime with Audra McDonald, Marin Mazzie and Brian Stokes Mitchell, and the 2001 revival of Stephen Sondheim's Follies. He was also assistant dance captain of the national tour of the Tony Award-winning musical Thoroughly Modern Millie. During that time, he also performed in Las Vegas with Ann-Margret and on European tours of West Side Story.

In 2006, Langworth left performing to join the New York-based casting agency, Bernard Telsey Casting, Inc. During this time, the Telsey agency supplied casts for Broadway productions like Rent, The Color Purple, Wicked, Legally Blonde and The Drowsy Chaperone. In a February 26, 2006 article in the New York Times entitled "Far From the Spotlight, the True Powers of Broadway," Jesse McKinley named it one of the premier casting agencies in New York. At Telsey, Langworth was responsible for casting Broadway musicals, most notably the first Broadway revival of South Pacific opening at the Lincoln Center Theater in April 2008 and starring Kelli O'Hara, Paulo Szot, Danny Burstein and Loretta Ables Sayre. Langworth also served as associate choreographer for this production which was awarded seven Tony Awards in 2008 and as dance captain for the national touring company.

In 2009 – 2010, he was associate director to Sheryl Kaller on the off-Broadway and Broadway productions of Geoffrey Nauffts' play Next Fall. The play was nominated for Best Director and Best Play in the 2010 Tony Awards. In 2012, Langworth directed the cabaret performances of Broadway couple Jenny Powers and Matt Cavenaugh, as well as the cabaret debut of Laura Osnes at the Cafe Carlyle in New York City. In the New York Times, Stephen Holden said Langworth's direction "had the fit of a carefully tailored gown for a star stepping onto the red carpet for the first time."

In 2013, Langworth directed Paulo Szot's solo concert at the Spoleto festival in Italy and at the nightclub 54 Below.

He has also directed well-received revivals of South Pacific, West Side Story and Carousel at Musical Theatre West. Broadway World called his production of Rodgers and Hammerstein's Carousel "quintessential." For his work on West Side Story, Langworth received the SAGE Award for Best Direction in 2016 from the LA theater critics. In addition, Langworth directed the regional premiere of Companion Piece by playwright Kevin Armento in the inaugural season of Denizen Theater in New Paltz, New York. Broadway World opined "The success of this production also is attributable to the uniformly excellent cast, tightly directed by Joe Langworth."

In September 2022 at the Chain Theater in New York City, Langworth debuted with collaborator Steve Marzullo an original musical entitled Fixing Frankie. The plot is alleged to be semi-autobiographical: it covers fifty years of the life of a gay Italian-American, notably though the AIDS epidemic. Langworth contributed the lyrics, book and direction of the musical. The cast included George Psomas, Laura Pavles, Robert Montano, Felicia Finley, Andrea Bianchi, Steve Scionti and Miguel Jarquin-Moreland. The musical made its off-Broadway debut in 2025.

== Broadway appearances ==
- Next Fall as associate director (Original, Drama)
- South Pacific as associate choreographer (Revival, Musical)
- On the Twentieth Century (Revival, Special, Musical, Comedy)
- Ragtime (Original, Musical, Drama)
- Follies (Revival, Musical, Drama)
- A Chorus Line (Original, Musical, Drama)

== Personal life ==
Langworth grew up in Port Chester, NY, attended Port Chester High School and graduated from the State University of New York at Geneseo, where he studied communications. He returned to his alma mater to be an associate professor of Dance. Langworth also taught at the State University of New York at New Paltz where he choreographed productions of The Producers and Rent (musical), and directed 25th Annual Putnam County Spelling Bee and Oklahoma (musical).

His husband is James Matthew Jones, a leading global public health expert who served as communications and policy director to Senator John Kerry (D-MA) and as executive vice president of The Vaccine Fund, a multibillion-dollar charity founded by the Bill & Melinda Gates Foundation. They married in October 2016 in West Park, Town of Esopus, New York.
