= Esopus, New York =

- Town
- Town of Esopus
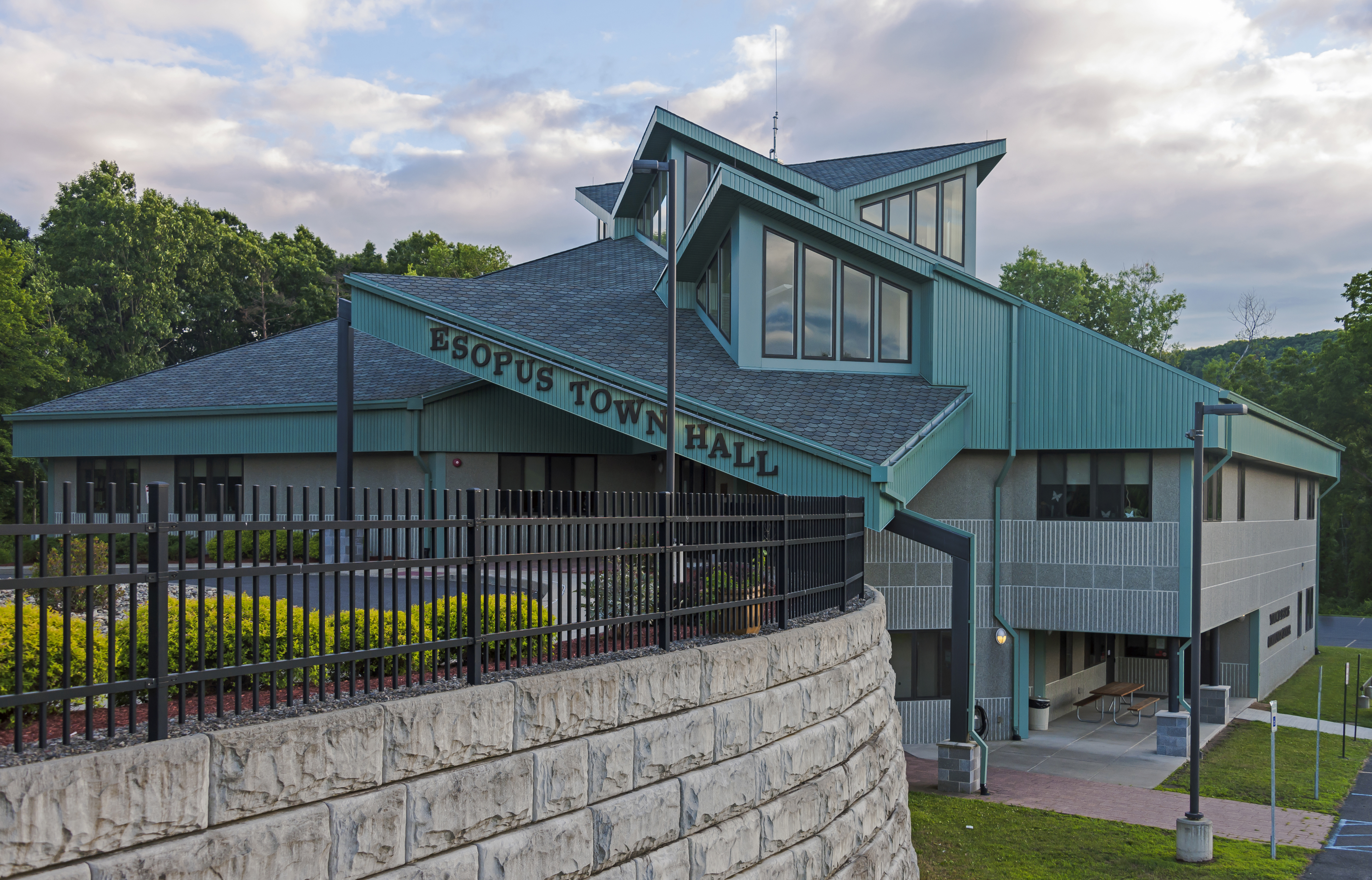
- Esopus Town Hall

- Location in Ulster County and the state of New York.

- Location within the state of New York Esopus, New York (the United States)
- Coordinates: 41°51′21″N 73°59′31″W
- Country: United States
- State: New York
- County: Ulster

Area
  - Total: 41.94 sq mi (108.62 km^{2})
  - Land: 37.31 sq mi (96.64 km^{2})
  - Water: 4.63 sq mi (11.99 km^{2}) 11.08%
- Elevation: 650 ft (198 m)

Population (2020)
  - Total: 9,548
  - Density: 256/sq mi (98.8/km^{2})
- Time zone: UTC-5 (Eastern (EST))
  - Summer (DST): UTC-4 (EDT)
- ZIP code: 12429
- Area code: 845
- FIPS code: 36-24691
- GNIS feature ID: 0978944
- Website: Town website

The Esopus Meadows Lighthouse

Esopus (/ˌɛˈsoʊpəs/ eh-SOHP-əs) is a town in Ulster County, New York, United States. The population was 9,548 at the 2020 census. The town was named after the local indigenous tribe and previously thought to mean "small river" in English. However, in the Lenape language, the word translates to "Wellspring of Creation". The Esopus people were one of the Lenape (Delaware) bands, belonging to a people who ranged from western Connecticut through lower New York, western Long Island, and parts of New Jersey and Pennsylvania along the Delaware River. The town is on the west bank of the Hudson River south of the city of Kingston. Its center is in Port Ewen. US Route 9W passes along the eastern side of the town.

== History ==
The town was founded in 1811 from territory taken from Kingston, New York, which also was called "Esopus" at one time. It was officially formed on April 5, 1811. In 1818, a part of it was set off to Kingston, and a portion of Hurley was annexed. On April 12, 1842, a portion of New Paltz was annexed, making up what is mostly present-day Esopus.

The first known European to settle in the area was a trapper by the name of Christoffel "Kit" Davits, who bartered with the Esopus people, a branch of the Lenape. Around 1652 or 1653 many settlers moved south from the Manor of Rensselaerswyck where they had worked the patroon's land.

During the American Revolution, a colonial prison was established there in the fall of 1777 to house overcrowding of a prison ship anchored offshore. The British army attacked this settlement in the same year and burned it to the ground.

The Cumming-Parker House, Esopus Meadows Lighthouse, Col. Oliver Hazard Payne Estate, Poppletown Farmhouse, and Reformed Protestant Dutch Church of Klyne Esopus Holy Cross Monastery are listed on the National Register of Historic Places. Other noteworthy structures in Esopus include the Mount Academy.

== United Nations ==
In 1946, Esopus was under consideration for the United Nations headquarters. The community was not alone: no fewer than 248 towns in New York State were among the possible locations, along with cities in other parts of the United States and in nearly every European country. On January 9, 1946, a photo appeared in the Kingston Daily Freeman, with a caption reading, "The local UNO Committee mapping a tentative itinerary for the Sub-Committee of the United Nations Organization (UNO) was impressed with the view shown above from Camp Chi-Wan-Da on the River road between Port Ewen and Ulster Park."

Many local property owners organized to oppose the proposed UN headquarters, however, fearing eminent domain. Ultimately, a donation of more than eight million dollars by John D. Rockefeller Jr. for 16 acres of land in Manhattan provided the UN with its current headquarters in 1948.

== Geography ==
According to the United States Census Bureau, the town has a total area of 41.9 square miles (109 km^{2}), of which 37.2 square miles (96 km^{2}) is land and 4.6 square miles (12 km^{2}) (11.08%) is water.

The eastern town line, marked by the Hudson River, is the border of Dutchess County. The Rondout Creek marks the northern town line, while the Wallkill River defines the western border.

The lowest point in the town is the shore of the Hudson River, which is at sea level. The highest point is the summit of Hussey Hill, at 906 feet (276 m). Hussey Hill is part of the Marlboro Mountains, which run roughly north to south through the central and eastern sections of Esopus.

Esopus also has three lakes: Esopus Lake and Mirror Lake, which are in Ulster Park, and Louisa Pond, which is located to the west of the hamlet of Esopus. Louisa Pond is located in Shaupeneak Ridge Cooperative Recreation Area.

== Government ==
The town's government is made up of a supervisor, four council members, two justices, a highway superintendent, a clerk, and a tax collector. Since 1811, three women have served as supervisor.

Town Supervisor: Danielle Freer (R) Town Council: Evelyn Clarke (D) Town Council: Jared Geuss (R) Town Council: Kathy Quick (D) Town Council: Laura Robinson (D)

== Demographics ==
Historical population
Census	Pop.	Note	%±
1820	1,513		—
1830	1,770		17.0%
1840	1,939		9.5%
1850	2,900		49.6%
1860	4,734		63.2%
1870	4,557		−3.7%
1880	4,736		3.9%
1890	4,659		−1.6%
1900	4,907		5.3%
1910	4,732		−3.6%
1920	3,913		−17.3%
1930	4,167		6.5%
1940	4,220		1.3%
1950	4,738		12.3%
1960	6,597		39.2%
1970	6,974		5.7%
1980	7,605		9.0%
1990	8,860		16.5%
2000	9,331		5.3%
2010	9,041		−3.1%
2020	9,548		5.6%
U.S. Decennial Census

=== 2000 census ===
As of the 2000 census there were 9,331 people, 3,439 households and 2,235 families residing in the town. The population density was 250.5 inhabitants per square mile (96.7/km^{2}). There were 3,724 housing units at an average density of 100 per square mile (38.6/km^{2}. The racial makeup of the town was 94.57% white; 2.18% African American; .24% Native American; .94% Asian; .49% from other races; and 1.59% from two or more races. Hispanic or Latino of any race were 1.91% of the population.

There were 3,439 households, out of which 29.5% had children under the age of 18 living with them; 51.7% were married couples living together; 8.8% had a female householder with no husband present; and 35% were non-families. 27.6% of all households were made up of individuals, and 8.6% had someone living alone who was 65 years of age or older. The average household size was 2.45 and the average family size was 3.01.

The population in town was spread out, with 25.4% under the age of 18; 6.9% from 18 to 24; 29.3% from 25 to 44; 25.9% from 45 to 64; and 12.6% who were 65 years of age or older. The median age was 39 years. For every 100 females, there were 93.7 males. For every 100 females age 18 and over, there were 91.0 males.

The median income for a household in the town was $46,915, and the median income for a family was $55,442. Males had a median income of $38,016 versus $31,010 for females. The per capita income for the town was $21,174.

=== 2010 census ===
As of the 2010 census, the population was 9,041. The racial makeup was 89.1% white, 5% African American, .4% Native American and 1.4% Asian. Hispanic or Latino people were 5.4% of the population.

=== 2020 census ===
As of the 2020 census, the population was 9,548. The racial makeup of the town was 84.50% White, 4.58% Black or African American, 0.07% Native American, 1.19% Asian, 2.40% from other races, and 7.26% from two or more races. Hispanic or Latino of any race were 6.32% of the population.

== Emergency services ==
The town has five fire districts: Connelly, Esopus, Rifton, St. Remy, and Port Ewen. Emergency medical services are provided by a volunteer ambulance corps.

== Transportation ==
The main thoroughfare, north-south, is U.S. 9W.

Into the early 1950s, the New York Central was running three trains a day six days a week through the town, with stops, heading north: West Park, Esopus, Ulster Park and Port Ewen, from Weehawken, New Jersey to either Kingston or Albany. Since 1958, this line has been freight only.

== Hamlets in Esopus ==
- Connelly – a hamlet in the northeastern part of the town and suburb of Kingston. It is on the south bank of Rondout Creek.
- Dashville – a hamlet south of Rifton.
- Esopus – a hamlet by the Hudson River and located on Route 9W.
- New Salem – a hamlet at the northern town line by Rondout Creek.
- Port Ewen – a hamlet and census designated place in the northeastern part of the town; it is considered a suburb of Kingston.
- Rifton – a hamlet and census designated place in the western part of the town, on Route 213.
- St. Remy – a hamlet south of New Salem.
- Sleightsburgh – a hamlet at the northeastern corner of the town and suburb of Kingston. The community is at the mouth of Rondout Creek.
- Ulster Park – a hamlet north of Esopus hamlet on Route 9W.
- Union Center – a hamlet west of Ulster Park.
- West Park – a hamlet south of Esopus hamlet on Route 9W.

== Notable people ==
- John Jacob Astor III
- Harry Payne Bingham
- Smith Brothers
- John Burroughs
- Major Gen. Daniel Butterfield
- Saint Frances Xavier Cabrini
- Joel Coen
- Peter Dinklage
- James Matthew Jones
- Joe Langworth
- Luann de Lesseps
- Frances McDormand
- Kelli O'Hara
- Alton Brooks Parker
- Floyd Patterson
- Colonel Oliver Hazard Payne
- George W. Pratt
- Sebastian Roche
- Blair Ross
- Nathaniel B. Terpeny (1809–1884), member of the New York State Assembly
- Sojourner Truth

== See also ==
- Esopus Wars
- Esopus Spitzenburg
