= Wallkill =

Wallkill may refer to the following in the U.S. state of New York:

- Wallkill, Orange County, New York, a town
- Wallkill, Ulster County, New York, a hamlet and census-designated place
- Wallkill Correctional Facility, in Ulster County
- Wallkill River, a tributary of the Hudson River
- Wallkill Valley, part of the Hudson Valley
