= Franny Reese State Park =

State park in New York, United States

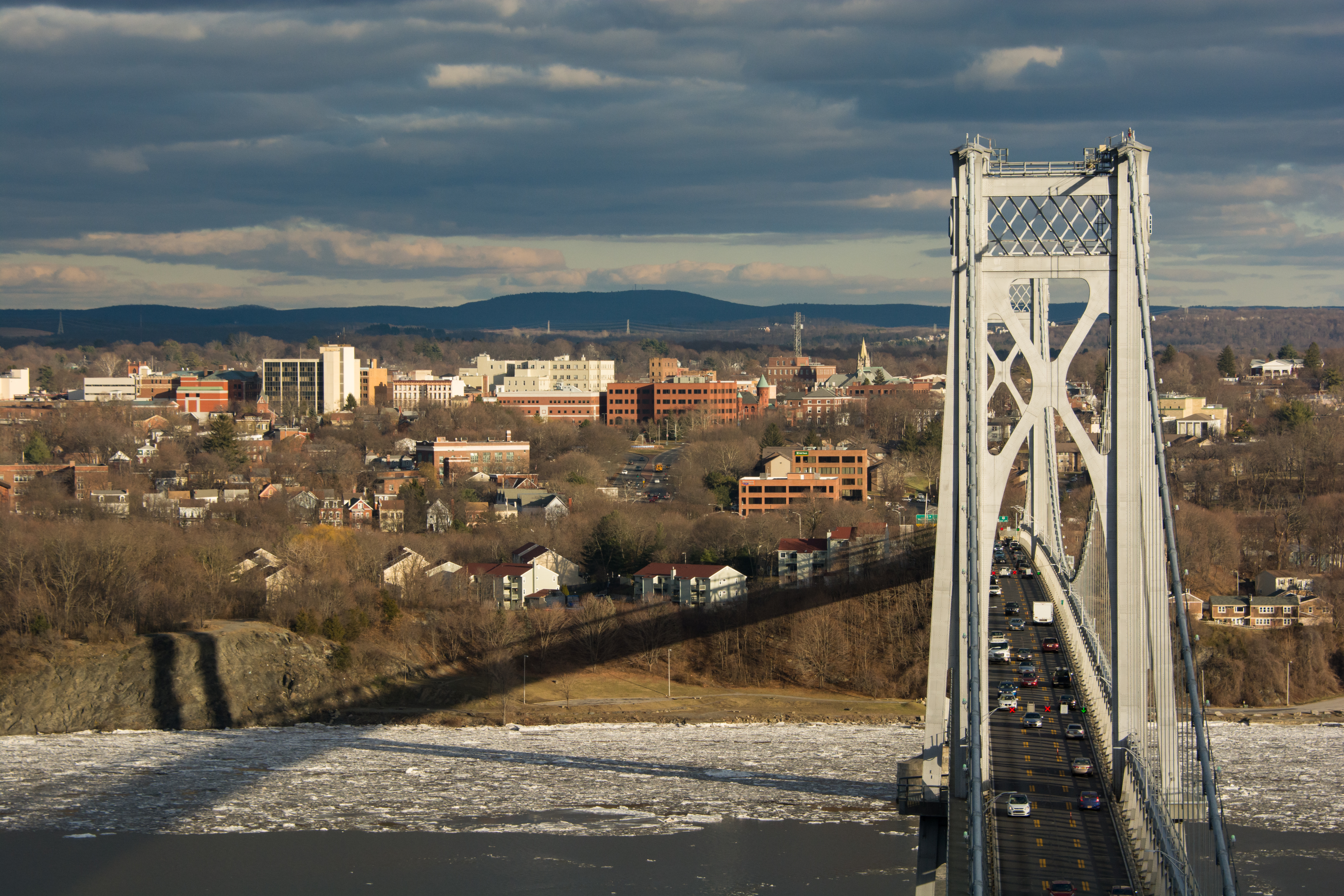
- View of Poughkeepsie from a scenic overlook in the park

- Location within New York
- Type: State park
- Location: Haviland Road; Highland, New York
- Nearest city: Poughkeepsie, New York
- Coordinates: 41°42′15″N 73°57′24″W
- Area: 251 acres (1.02 km^{2})
- Created: 2009
- Operator: Scenic Hudson; Palisades Interstate Park Commission; New York State Office of Parks, Recreation and Historic Preservation
- Open: All year
- Website: Franny Reese State Park

Franny Reese State Park is a 251-acre (1.02 km^{2}) state park located in the Town of Lloyd in Ulster County, New York. The park is managed by Scenic Hudson and is part of the Palisades Interstate Park system.

== History ==
The land comprising Franny Reese State Park was once an estate known as "Cedar Glen", built in the mid-19th century by painless dentistry pioneer Charles H. Roberts. After Roberts' death, the estate fell into disrepair as his heirs fought over ownership of the property.

The property was purchased in 2003 by Scenic Hudson, a not-for-profit environmental organization that aims to conserve land along the Hudson River between Albany and New York City. It opened as a state park in 2009, shortly after the land's ownership was transferred to the New York State Office of Parks, Recreation and Historic Preservation, although Scenic Hudson continues to manage the property.

The park is named for environmentalist Frances "Franny" Reese (1917-2003), who worked to conserve lands in the Hudson River region.

== Park description ==
Franny Reese State Park's main feature is its 2.5 miles (4.0 km) of hiking trails along old carriage roads that may also be used for snowshoeing and cross-country skiing in the winter. The trails offer views of the Hudson River, the nearby Mid-Hudson Bridge, the Walkway over the Hudson, and the City of Poughkeepsie across the river. Ruins of the 19th century mansion are also visible within the park.

== See also ==
- List of New York state parks
