= New York State Route 299 =

State highway in Ulster County, New York, US

New York State Route 299
- Map of Ulster County in eastern New York with NY 299 highlighted in red

Route information
- Maintained by NYSDOT, Ulster County and the village of New Paltz
- Length: 12.39 mi (19.94 km)
- Existed: 1930–present

Major junctions
- West end: US 44 / NY 55 in Gardiner
- NY 32 / NY 208 in New Paltz village I-87 / New York Thruway in New Paltz town
- East end: US 9W in Highland

Location
- Country: United States
- State: New York
- Counties: Ulster

Highway system
- New York Highways; Interstate; US; State; Reference; Parkways
| ← NY 298 | → NY 300 |

New York State Route 299 (NY 299) is a short but important state route entirely within Ulster County, New York, in the United States. Centered on its interchange with the New York State Thruway outside New Paltz, it provides access from that road to the popular recreational attractions of the Shawangunk Ridge to the west and Poughkeepsie to the east. Only the eastern section is a state highway; from Shawangunk to New Paltz, it is owned and maintained by Ulster County.

== Route description ==
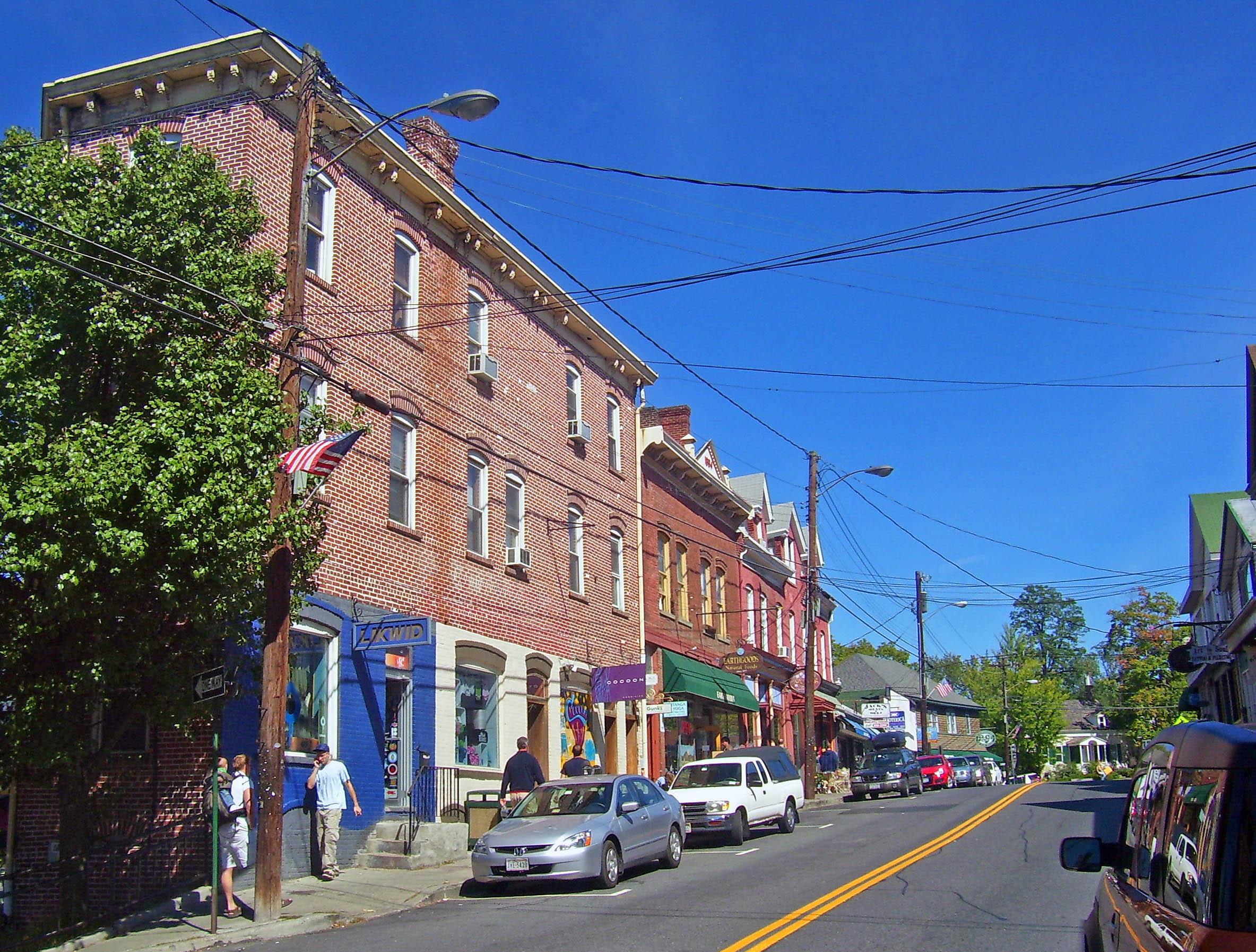
NY 299 through downtown New Paltz

NY 299 begins at an intersection with US 44/NY 55 just south of Lake Minnewaska in the town of Gardiner. NY 299 winds northeast through the deep woods of Gardiner, paralleling US 44 and NY 55 as it climbs through the Shawangunk Mountains. Passing well to the south of the hairpin turn on US 44 and NY 55, NY 299 bends eastward under control of Ulster County, with the County Route 8 (CR 8) designation. Near Hasbrouck Road, the dense woods recede and NY 299 crosses east through fields through Gardiner. Soon crossing into the town of New Paltz, NY 299 runs along the flood plain of the Wallkill River.

NY 299 and CR 8 make a dart to the northeast near a dirt extension of Jacobs Lane, straightening east again at Mohonk Private Road. At the junction with CR 7 (Libertyville Road), CR 8 ends and NY 299 and CR 7 continue east until crossing the river into the village of New Paltz. In the village, NY 299 proceeds northeast as Main Street, reaching a junction with NY 32 (North Chestnut Street) and the northern terminus of NY 208 (South Chestnut Street). NY 299 and NY 32 become concurrent through the village, crossing through the commercial center of the village on Main Street. The routes bend eastward at North Front Street, crossing through a residential/commercial section of the village. At the junction with Manheim Boulevard, NY 32 turns off to the south while NY 299 continues eastward along Main Street. After leaving downtown New Paltz, the route re-enters the town of New Paltz, crossing into exit 18 of the New York State Thruway (I-87). Continuing east along Main Street, NY 299 continues through the town of New Paltz, crossing the northern terminus of CR 22A (South Ohioville Road). Paralleling a former alignment of itself, NY 299 crosses through the hamlet of Ohioville and enters the town of Lloyd. In Lloyd, NY 299 remains a two-lane commercial road, crossing a junction with CR 22 (South Street / South Elting Corners Road).

Bypassing the hamlet of Elting Corners to the south, NY 299 becomes a residential road through the town of Lloyd, passing north of a mobile home park. Crossing a junction with CR 12 (New Paltz Road), the route bends northward and begins a parallel with CR 15 (South Riverside Road). CR 15 soon merges into NY 299, which continues east past a junction with another piece of CR 15 (North Riverside Road). Paralleling each other once again, NY 299 turns southeastward, continuing past residences in the town of Lloyd before reaching a junction with US 9W. This junction marks the eastern terminus of NY 299, just north barely within town of Highland.

== History ==
NY 299 was assigned as part of the 1930 renumbering of state highways in New York to the portion of its modern alignment east of New Paltz. It was extended westward to its current western terminus in Gardiner in the early 1950s.

== Major intersections ==
The entire route is in Ulster County.

| Location | mi | km | Destinations | Notes |
|---|---|---|---|---|
| Gardiner | 0.00 | 0.00 | US 44 / NY 55 – Gardiner, Kerhonkson | Western terminus |
| Town of New Paltz | 4.87 | 7.84 | CR 7 south (Libertyville Road) – Bruynswick School No. 8, Ulster County Fair | Western end of CR 7 concurrency |
| Town of New Paltz | 5.65 | 9.09 | CR 7 north (Springtown Road) – Lake Mohonk | Eastern end of CR 7 concurrency |
| Village of New Paltz | 5.97 | 9.61 | NY 32 north (North Chestnut Street) / NY 208 south (South Chestnut street) – Rosendale, Wallkill | Western end of NY 32 concurrency; northern terminus of NY 208 |
| Village of New Paltz | 6.48 | 10.43 | NY 32 south (Manheim Boulevard) – Newburgh, State University of New York at New Paltz | Eastern end of NY 32 concurrency |
| Town of New Paltz | 7.23 | 11.64 | I-87 / New York Thruway – Albany, New York City | Exit 18 on I-87 / Thruway |
| Lloyd | 9.60 | 15.45 | CR 12 east (New Paltz Road) – Highland | Western terminus of CR 12 |
| Lloyd | 12.39 | 19.94 | US 9W – Kingston, Poughkeepsie, Mid-Hudson Bridge | Eastern terminus; hamlet of Highland |
1.000 mi = 1.609 km; 1.000 km = 0.621 mi: Concurrency terminus; Electronic toll collection

== See also ==
- List of county routes in Ulster County, New York
