= Cumming-Parker House =

Historic house in New York, United States

- U.S. National Register of Historic Places
- Location within New York Location within the United States
- Nearest city: 50 Appletree Road, Esopus, New York
- Coordinates: 41°49′58.61″N 73°57′31.25″W
- Area: 5.9 acres (2.4 ha)
- Built: ca. 1836
- NRHP reference No.: 10000014
- Added to NRHP: February 12, 2010

Cumming-Parker House is a historic estate located at Esopus in Ulster County, New York. It is a two-story, wood-frame house. It was built about 1836 and enlarged about 1875. It features a gallery along all four sides. Also on the property are a boat house, two-seat privy, summer house, and the remains of a large ice house.

It was listed on the National Register of Historic Places in 2010.
