= Counterpart International =

US non-profit organization

Counterpart International is a non-profit organization based in Washington, D.C. Counterpart partners with local organizations to build inclusive, sustainable communities in which people thrive. Since its founding in 1965, Counterpart has established programs and activities in more than 65 countries on six continents.

== History ==
The organization was established in 1965 as the Foundation of the People of the South Pacific (FSP) by an Australian Marist missionary priest, Father Stanley Hosie, and actress Betty Bryant Silverstein. They focused on supporting communities in the remote and often-overlooked islands of the South Pacific. In 1968, the organization began receiving funding from the United States Agency for International Development (USAID). During the 1970s, FSP obtained more grants to expand its staff and to transition its field offices into indigenous, independent NGOs that were locally staffed. FSP improved on the model of international aid by providing institutions in the South Pacific with skills to rebuild infrastructure, develop sustainable solutions to poverty, and facilitate economic growth. In 1992, (USAID) tapped the organization to "go global" and help determine a role for U.S. non-governmental organizations (NGOs) in the former Soviet Union. At this time, the organization's name was changed to Counterpart International to better reflect an expanded mission.

== Programs and goals ==
Counterpart International currently has programs in governance and civil society, resilient food systems, women's empowerment, and climate resiliency. Gender equity and social inclusion have been guiding principles at Counterpart since its founding. The organization's programs bring marginalized groups into civic life, supporting their ability to influence decisions that affect their lives..

== Board of directors ==
Counterpart has a headquarters in Washington DC. The organization is overseen by a board of directors who are responsible for the legal and fiduciary operations of the organization. The current board of directors consists of:

- Board Chair: James Matthew Jones
- Board Vice Chair: Pauline Devinger
- Jose Guillermo Castillo, CEO, Corporación Castillo Hermanos; President, 2020 Foundation
- Lois Bruu, Vice President, Humanitarian & Development team, MasterCard
- Dr. Renata Vargas Amaral, Under Minister for International Affairs and Development, Ministry of Planning and Budget of Brazil
- Rashid Sesay, Ambassador Extraordinary and Plenipotentiary of Sierra Leone to the United Arab Emirates, India, and Bangladesh
- David Burton, Director of Finance and Accounting, Bezos Earth Fund
- Manlio Carrelli, CEO, CB Insights
- Dr. Joe Leonard, Assistant Vice President of External Affairs, Howard University
- Tiffany Russo, Senior Managing General Counsel, Verizon
- Trona Balkissoon, chief financial officer, Nestlé Professional Solutions
- Chris Gilson, Millennium Challenge Corporation (retired)
- Fiona McRaith, director of the Climate Pledge, Global Optimism
- Sarah Saucedo, head of privacy, Corient

== Accomplishments ==
In 1991, President George Bush awarded FSP co-founder Betty Silverstein with the U.S. Presidential End Hunger Award for Individual Achievement. First Lady Hillary Clinton also commended Silverstein at Counterpart's 500th humanitarian Airlift at Andrews Air Force Base in Virginia in early 1998.

In May 2009, Counterpart was granted a Leader with Associates (LWA) Cooperative Agreement with USAID, who expressed confidence in Counterpart to implement the "Global Civil Society Strengthening" (GCSS) program that builds the capacity of civil society organizations around the world. Counterpart held the LWA for eight years, and received $350 million in awards through the agreement.
