= Reformed Protestant Dutch Church of Klyne Esopus =

Historic church in New York, United States

- U.S. National Register of Historic Places
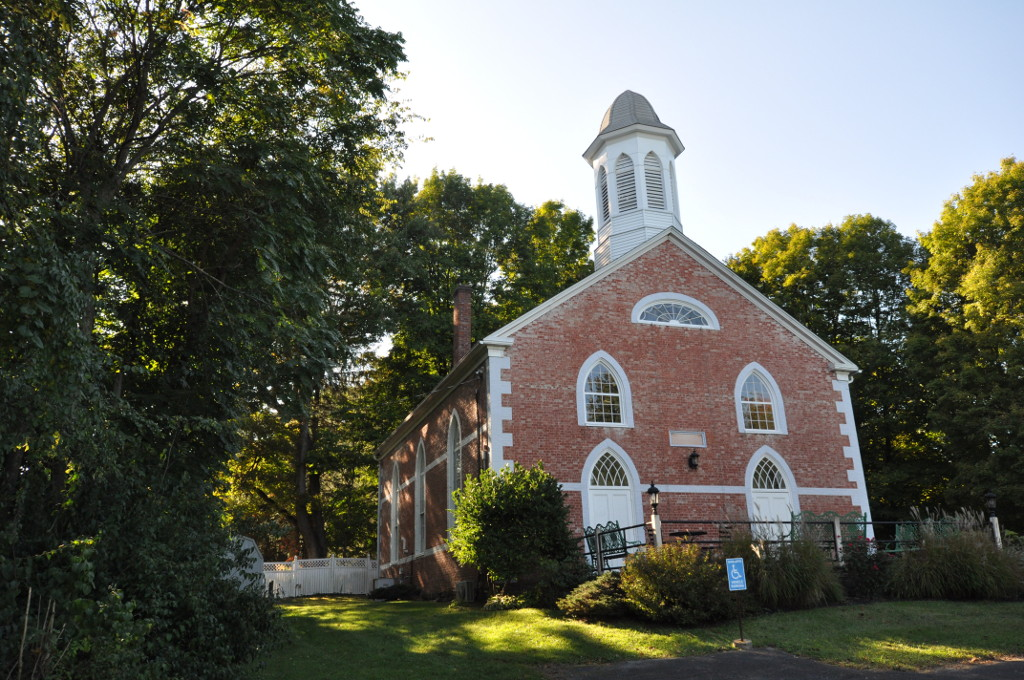

- Location within New York Location within the United States
- Location: 764 US 9W, Esopus, New York
- Coordinates: 41°51′13.72″N 73°58′9.58″W
- NRHP reference No.: 02001321
- Added to NRHP: November 15, 2002

Reformed Protestant Dutch Church of Klyne Esopus, now known as Klyne Esopus Historical Society Museum, is a historic Dutch Reformed church building at 764 US 9W in Esopus, Ulster County, New York.

The church building was constructed in 1827. In 1965 the Ulster Park Reformed Church closed the church after 138 years of operation. In the late 1960s, local preservationists thwarted efforts to raze to the building, and it became a museum of the Klyne Esopus Historical Society.

The church was added to the National Register of Historic Places in 2002.
