= Hemlock Ridge Multiple Use Area =

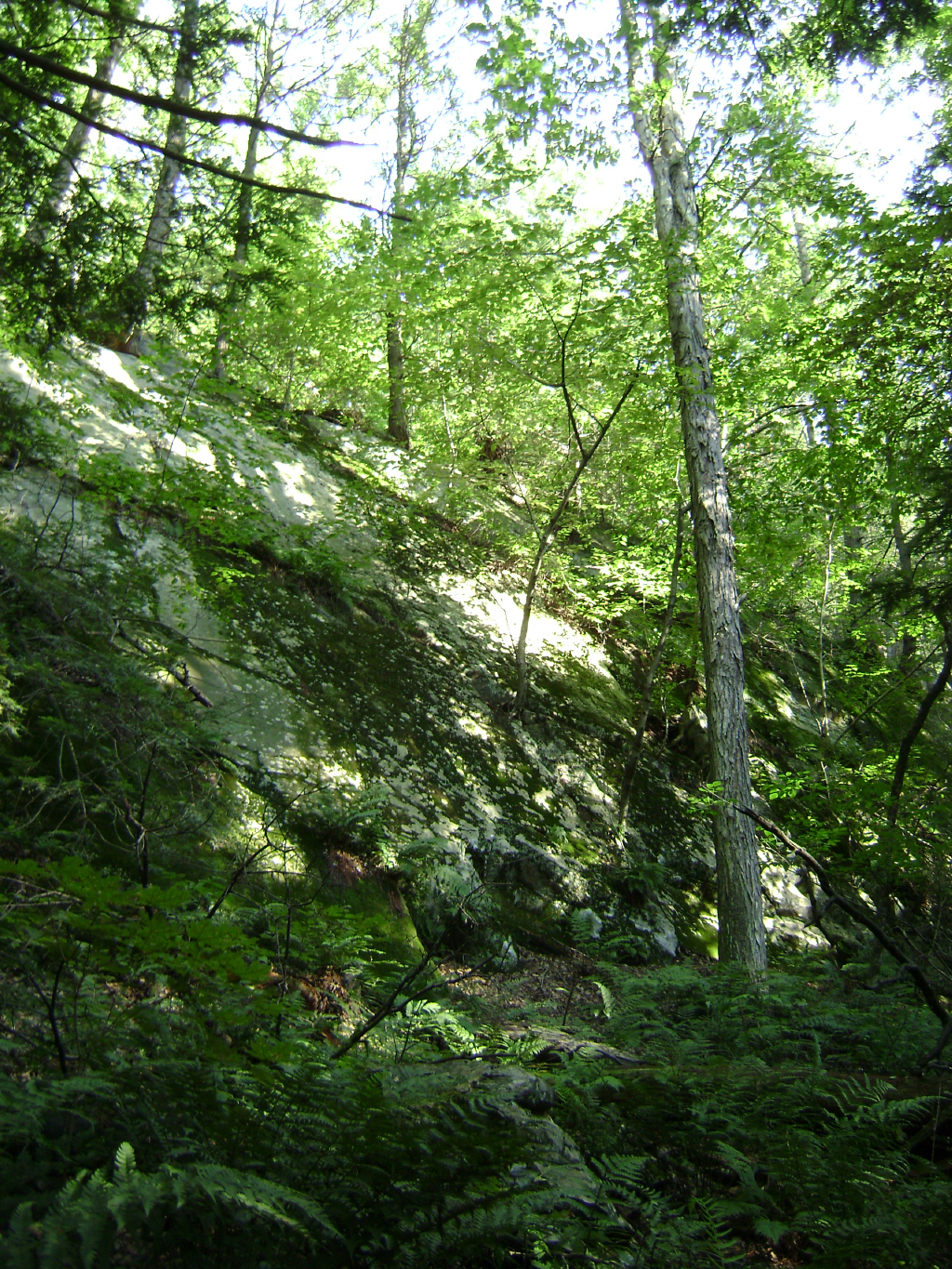
- Quartzite cliff in Hemlock Ridge Multiple Use Area
- Interactive map of Hemlock Ridge Multiple Use Area
- Type: State forest
- Location: Plattekill, New York, USA
- Coordinates: 41°37′52″N 74°02′07″W
- Area: 80 acres (32 ha)
- Operator: New York State Department of Environmental Conservation
- Open: All year

Hemlock Ridge Multiple Use Area is an 80-acre (32 ha) state forest in New York, USA. It is located in the town of Plattekill in southern Ulster County. The forest covers a hilly area on the western flank of Marlboro Mountain, the namesake ridge of the Marlboro Mountains range.

Designated as a multiple use area under New York's forest management scheme, Hemlock Ridge offers a variety of outdoor activities, including hiking, fishing, hunting, cross country skiing, and possibly camping (with permission). These uses are in addition to conservation efforts such as protection of sensitive environments.

Trails in Hemlock Ridge are un-blazed former logging roads and hunting paths. These trails cross terrain consisting of sandstone/quartzite ridges separated by short stretches of sometimes boggy valleys. True to the forest's name, Eastern Hemlock (Tsuga canadensis) is relatively abundant, particularly along the slopes of the ridges. As of 2008, 28 acres (11 ha) of land had been added to the forest's original 52 acres (21 ha), the new acquisition including a wetland area.

Access to the Hemlock Ridge Multiple Use Area is possible from a parking lot adjacent to Lewis Road, a short distance from the Milton Turnpike (Ulster County Route 10).

== See also ==
Recreational/historical areas in the Marlboro Mountains:

- Hudson Valley Rail Trail
- John Burroughs Nature Sanctuary at Slabsides
- Shaupeneak Ridge Cooperative Recreation Area
