= Next Fall =

Play written by Geoffrey Nauffts

- Original language: English
- Written by: Geoffrey Nauffts
- Characters: Adam; Luke; Holly; Brandon; Arlene; Butch
- Subject: Religion, homosexuality, coping and loss
- Genre: Drama

Premiere
- Date: February 16, 2010
- Place: Peter Jay Sharp Theater; New York City
- Official website

Next Fall is a play written by Geoffrey Nauffts. The play is about two gay men in a committed relationship with a twist, with one, Luke, being devoutly religious and the other, Adam, an atheist. The play revolves around their five-year relationship and how they make it work despite their differences. However, when an accident changes everything, Adam must turn to Luke's family for support and answers. The play, directed by Sheryl Kaller with associate director Joe Langworth, opened off-Broadway in 2009 before transferring to the Helen Hayes Theater in February, 2010.

== Production history ==
Next Fall, produced by Naked Angels, began performances Off-Broadway at the Peter Jay Sharp Theatre on May 26, 2009 and opened to positive reviews June 3, 2009. The sold-out production, which was to close June 21, 2009, resulted in three extensions through Aug. 8, 2009. The cast for the off-Broadway production included Patrick Breen as Adam, Patrick Heusinger as Luke, Maddie Corman as Holly, Sean Dugan as Brandon, Connie Ray as Arlene, and Cotter Smith as Butch.

The off-Broadway production transferred to the Helen Hayes Theatre on Broadway. Previews began February 16, 2010 and the play officially opened on March 11, 2010. The entire off-Broadway cast replicated their roles on Broadway as did director Sheryl Kaller and associate director Joe Langworth.

Ben Brantley gave a rave in The New York Times, and called the play an "artful, thoughtful and very moving story".

Among its positive reviews, the show was named "the little play that could" by New York theater critic David Cote. It closed on July 4, 2010, after 26 previews and 132 regular performances.

The UK premiere of Next Fall was produced by James Quaife Productions staged at the Southwark Playhouse from 24 September until 25 October 2014. The cast featured Charlie Condou, Nancy Crane, Ben Cura, Martin Delaney, Mitchell Mullen and Sirine Saba. The play was directed by Luke Sheppard with design by David Woodhead, Lighting design by Howard Hudson, Sound design by David Gregory and casting by Sophie Parrott.

The Australian premiere of Next Fall was at the Seymour Centre in Sydney in October 2016. The production ran for 4 weeks (19 performances) and was produced by Boyslikeme Productions. The cast included Cormac Costello as Butch, Mark Dessaix as Brandon, Alex Ewan as Luke, Victoria Greiner as Holly, Mary Anne Halpin as Arlene and Darrin Redgate as Adam. It was Directed by Andy Leonard, Designed by Irma Calibrese with Lighting Design by Steve Furzey. Melbourne and Adelaide seasons followed with local casts but with Darrin Redgate still at the helm.

The Greek premiere of Next Fall was at the En Athinais theatre in Athens in October 2024, under the title "Krata me" ("Hold me"). The cast included Manolis Emmanouel as Adam, Dimitris Liakopoulos as Luke, Andria Rapti as Holly, Jinny Papadopoulou as Arlene, Dimitris Karaviotis as Butch and Alkis Bakogiannis as Brandon.

== Synopsis ==
Luke believes in God. Adam believes in everything else. "Next Fall" portrays the ups and downs of this unlikely couple’s five-year relationship with sharp humor and unflinching honesty. And when an accident changes everything, Adam must turn to Luke’s family and friends for support... and answers. "Next Fall" offers a picture of modern romance, asking questions about commitment, love, and faith.

== Original Broadway cast ==
- Patrick Breen as Adam
- Patrick Heusinger as Luke
- Maddie Corman as Holly
- Sean Dugan as Brandon
- Connie Ray as Arlene
- Cotter Smith as Butch.

== Awards and nominations ==
2010 Drama Desk Awards

- Outstanding Play (nominated)
- Outstanding Featured Actor in a Play – Sean Dugan (nominated)

2010 Tony Awards

- Best Play (nominated)
- Best Direction of a Play – Sheryl Kaller (nominated)

2010 Outer Critics Circle Awards

- Outstanding New Broadway Play (nominated)
- John Gassner Award – Geoffrey Nauffts (winner)

=== 2013 BroadwayWorld Regional Awards ===
- Best Actor in a Play – Josh Rhett Noble
- Best Actress in a Play – Elizabeth Casalini
- Best Direction of a Play – Jennifer Jones
