= Brown–Ellis House =

Historic house in New York, United States

- U.S. National Register of Historic Places
- Location within New York Location within the United States
- Location: 382 Crescent Ave., Highland, New York
- Coordinates: 41°42′12″N 74°02′33″W
- Area: 2.83 acres (1.15 ha)
- Built: c. 1800, c. 1835, c. 1910
- Architectural style: Greek Revival, Colonial Revival
- NRHP reference No.: 14000316
- Added to NRHP: June 17, 2014

Brown–Ellis House, also known as the Amos Brown House and Baker House, is a historic home located at Highland, Ulster County, New York. The house was originally built about 1800, and expanded and renovated in the Greek Revival style about 1835. It consists of a 1 1/2-story main block with a wing. It is of timber-frame construction and has gable roofs on both sections. A full width Colonial Revival style front porch was added about 1910.

It was listed on the National Register of Historic Places in 2014.
