= James Matthew Jones =

American lobbyist (born 1961)

James Matthew "Jim" Jones (born 3 April 1961 in Nyack, NY, US) is an American economist and global public health expert.

Jones is the oft-quoted former communications director for U.S. Senator John Kerry. He began his career as a staff assistant at the Democratic National Committee's Campaign 88. At the forefront of many of the gay rights debates in the U.S. Congress during the 1990s, Jones became known as an advocate of the rights of people living with AIDS as well as gay and lesbian Americans. He also advised Senator Patty Murray on AIDS, trade, budget and financial policy during her freshman term in the United States Senate from 1993 to 1995.

In 2000, he was tapped by the Bill & Melinda Gates Foundation to helm the operations of their largest grantee, the Vaccine Fund, the financing arm of the Global Alliance for Vaccines and Immunization. This multibillion-dollar charity has as it mission to immunize every child in the 75 poorest countries of the world.

In 2002, Jones was a judge at the Miss America pageant in Atlantic City, New Jersey along with Donna Axum, Evan Dobelle and Jose Feghali.

In 2017, in recognition of his service to global public health, he was inducted to Oxford University’s Chancellor’s Court of Benefactors by the University's Chancellor Chris Patten, Lord Patten of Barnes in a ceremony at Divinity School, Oxford.

In retirement, he serves on the boards of Counterpart International, the Cherie Blair Foundation for Women, WEConnect International and Concordia.

== Personal life ==
Jones was born in Nyack, New York and graduated from Georgetown University in 1983 with a degree in international relations. He also studied at LMU Munich under the auspices of the Fulbright program and has graduate degrees from the University of Oxford where he concentrated his studies on development and international economic policy.

His husband is Broadway performer, choreographer, and director Joe Langworth. They married in October 2016 in West Park, Town of Esopus, New York.
