= Josh Rhett Noble =

American actor (born 1980)

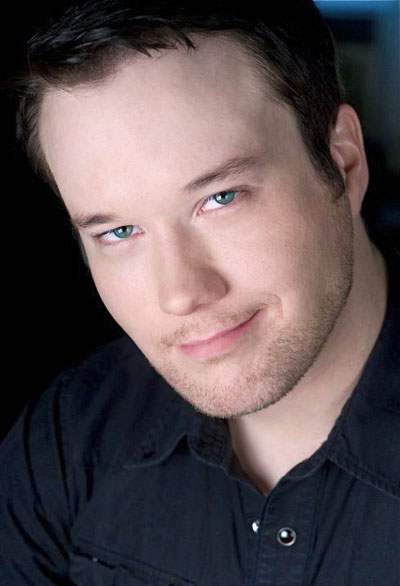
- Born: September 6, 1980 (age 46); Atlanta, Georgia, U.S.
- Website: Official website

Josh Rhett Noble (born September 6, 1980) is an American stage, television, film and voice actor. Noble is known for his role as Gaston in Disney's Beauty and the Beast in theaters across the country, various guest star roles in television including stints in Law & Order: SVU, The Wonder Years and TIME: The Kalief Browder Story and for providing voice and motion capture for the Rockstar produced video game Red Dead Redemption 2. He is the recipient of the 2011 BroadwayWorld Award for Best Actor in a Musical for his portrayal of Matthew in Altar Boyz as well as the 2013 BroadwayWorld Award for Best Actor in a Play for his portrayal of Adam in Next Fall.

== Biography ==
=== Early life ===
Noble was born at Crawford Long Hospital in Atlanta, Georgia. The son of the late Janet Brown Noble and the late Lamar Noble, Josh grew up in the small town of Tallapoosa, Georgia along with his older brother, Jason. As a 6-year-old performer, he graduated from entertaining his family and friends to the stage with the community’s production of Down by the Creek Bank.

Noble attended Haralson County High School, where he continued to perform locally and abroad, and was awarded the Lisa Bowlin Abney Performing Arts Memorial Award for Excellence in the Arts. Graduating Salutatorian, an honor graduate, and voted "Most Intellectual", Noble studied musical theatre and film at the University of Miami.

=== Career ===
Noble's theatre career has spanned over 70 professional productions in theaters across the U.S.

Noble won acclaim for his work as Gaston in Disney's Beauty and the Beast beginning in 2004, and while in the Cleveland, Ohio, production of the show, he was called the "show-stealer" and "phenomenal".

Noble has also starred as Matthew in the Atlanta, Georgia, and Cleveland, Ohio, premiers of Altar Boyz, for which he also received critical acclaim. For the Atlanta production, Noble was hailed as the leader of the "marvelous" cast. In Cleveland, Noble was called "spot on", and the "singing standout" of the show. In 2010, Noble reprised the role of Matthew in Cleveland, Ohio at the Hanna Theatre in Playhouse Square where he was awarded the 2011 BroadwayWorld Award for Best Actor in a Musical.

In addition to his work in Beauty and the Beast and Altar Boyz, Noble has performed in multiple regional premieres, including his Award Winning performance in Next Fall (Adam) and the Florida regional premiere of 9 to 5 (Franklin Hart, Jr.). Other notable performances include shows such as Company (Bobby), Forever Plaid (Sparky/Smudge), Camelot (Lancelot), Godspell (Judas), The Sound of Music (Captain von Trapp), The Pajama Game (Sid), The Fantasticks (Matt), Jekyll & Hyde (Stride/Utterson), Little Shop of Horrors (Audrey II Voice), Guys and Dolls (Sky), The Music Man (Harold), Grease (Kenickie) and Lend Me a Tenor (Max). Noble was also seen in the world premiere of the play OSWALD, based on the interrogation of suspected presidential assassin Lee Harvey Oswald, which played at the Richmond Shepard Theatre in New York City.

Noble was recently seen in David Henrie's directorial film debut, This Is the Year, produced by Selena Gomez, the new Bruce Willis film, Wrong Place, the new Fox TV series Monarch, the new comedy Finding Happy on Bounce, The Wonder Years on abc and a recurring cop role on Found on nbc. You can see him in part one and two of the film adaptation of the late Eric Jerome Dickey's Friends and Lovers on Lifetime.

== Filmography ==
=== Film ===
Year	Title	Role	Notes
2016	Trouble	Miller	3 Stump Circle Films
2017	A Dose of Therapy	Steve	Noble Endeavors
2018	Guided by Voices	Vivian's Spirit Guide	Tribblevision Pictures
2019	In Between	Joel	Noble Endeavors
2020	This Is the Year	Jared	David Henrie, director/ Selena Gomez, producer
2022	Wrong Place	Officer Richter	EFO Films
2023	Free	Gillium	Triumphant Pictures
2025	Friends and Lovers	Officer	Lifetime
2026	At Least You're Alive	Dr. Lindsey	TriGen Films

=== Video games ===
Year	Title	Role	Notes
2018	Red Dead Redemption 2	Lemoyne Raiders Gang, The Local Pedestrian Population	Rockstar Games

=== Television ===
Year	Title	Role	Notes
2015	Mysteries at the Castle	Prince John	Episode: Book Thief, Bigamist Duchess, Patent-ly Absurd
2015	The Haunting Of	Singing Man	Episode: Audrina Patridge
2015	Momsters: When Moms Go Bad	Patrick	Episode: A Helping Hand
2015	A Crime to Remember	Matt (Sketch Artist)	Episode: Last Night Stand
2016	Shadow of Doubt	Steven (Drinking buddy)	Episode: The Wrong Man
2016	I'd Kill for You	Detective Jeffrey Yeager	Episode: Killing Me Softly
2016	Evil Lives Here	Keith Johnson	Episode: The Prophet
2016	Unraveled	Tom (Hotel manager)	Episode: Driven to Perfection
2017	TIME: The Kalief Browder Story	Public Defender	Series Regular
2018	Law & Order: Special Victims Unit	Bobby Johnson	Episode: Service (Season 19, Episode 18)
2018	How to Do Everything	Will	Episode: What Will It Take?
2022	Monarch	Persistent Reporter	Episode: Stop at Nothing (Series Premiere)
2022	Finding Happy	HR Rep	Episode: Finding a Chance
2023	The Wonder Years	Jim Fleming	Episode: Blockbusting
2025	Found	Cop (recurring)	Episodes: Missing While Misunderstood, Missing While Grieving
