= Betty Bryant =

Australian actress

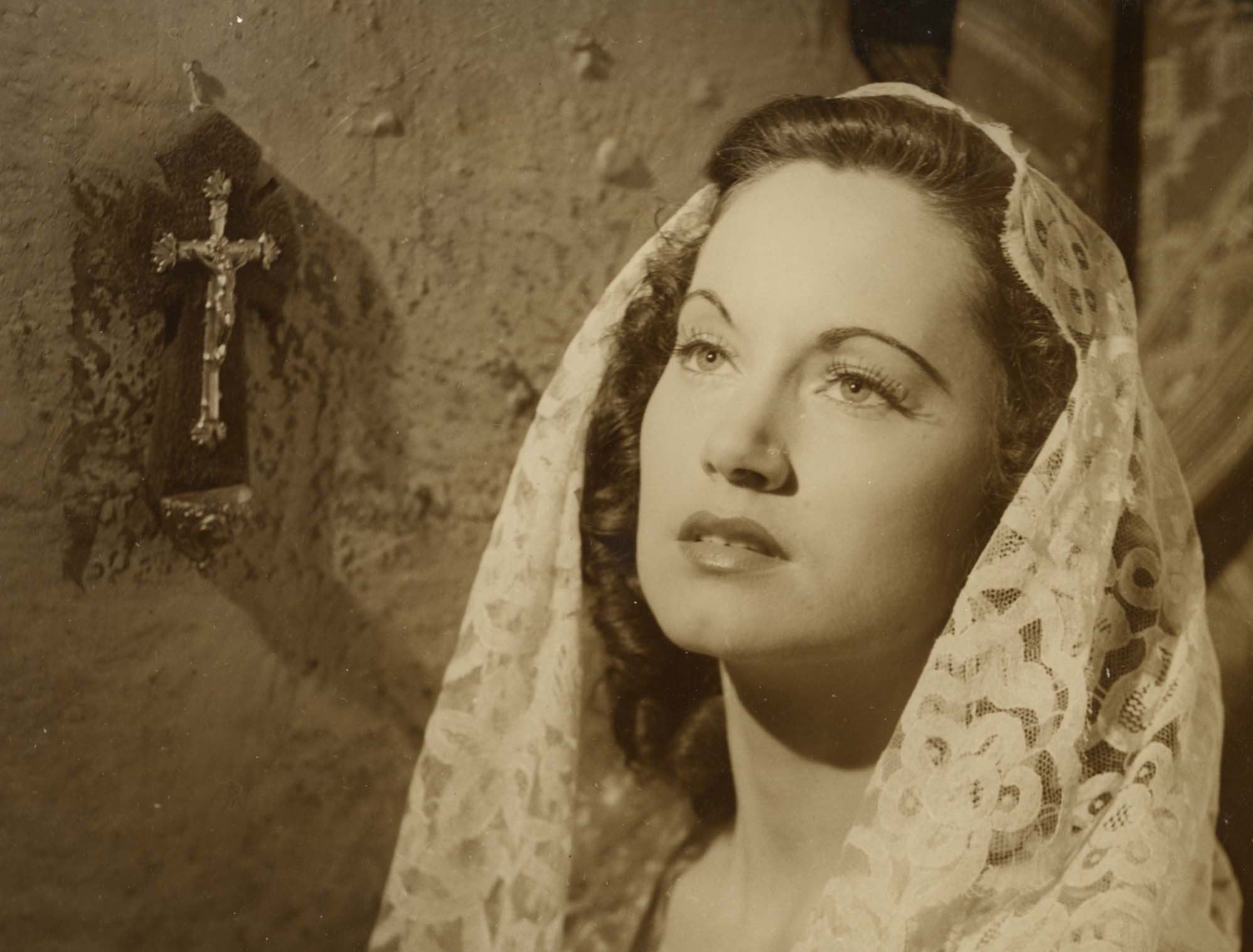
- Betty Bryant, still from the film 40,000 Horsemen, 1940
- Born: Elizabeth Bryant; 27 June 1920; Bristol, England
- Died: 3 October 2005 (aged 85); Seattle, Washington, U.S.
- Other names: Elizabeth Bryant Silverstein
- Occupation: Actress
- Spouse: Maurice Silverstein (m. 1941; died 1999)

Elizabeth Bryant Silverstein (née Bryant; 27 June 1920 – 3 October 2005), better known as Betty Bryant, was a British-born Australian actress known for playing the lead character in Forty Thousand Horsemen.

== Early life ==
Bryant was born on 27 June 1920 in Bristol, South West England. When she was age four, her father died. With her mother, a professional singer, she emigrated to Melbourne, Australia. In 1932, the family relocated to Sydney after Bryant's mother remarried. As a teenager, Bryant was featured on the local radio show The Youth Show.

== Career ==
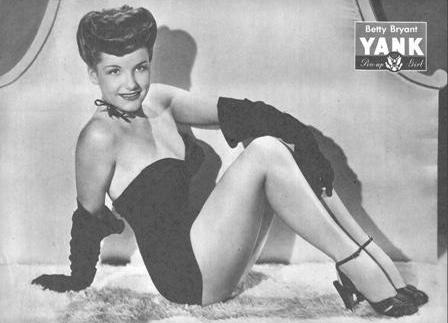
Pin-up photo of Bryant for Yank, the Army Weekly in 1944

Bryant began her career as an actress playing minor characters in film as The Broken Melody (1938) and Gone to the Dogs (1939). Her film breakthrough came when she played the lead character in Forty Thousand Horsemen (1940), which was the "first Australian film to win international success". Reportedly discovered by screenwriter Elsie Blake-Wilkins, she was described by the film's director Charles Chauvel as "the most important film personality discovered in Australia since Errol Flynn". Filmink called her "very winning."

In June 1941, while in Singapore promoting Forty Thousand Horsemen, Bryant fell in love with Metro-Goldwyn-Mayer sales manager Maurice "Red" Silverstein (died 1999), and they got married a few days later in Sydney; the couple would go on to have three children. She became pregnant with her first child in 1942 and had to withdraw from her role as Carol Beldon (later played by Teresa Wright) in Mrs. Miniver. Bryant was initially chosen to play the female lead in Jungle Captive (1945). However, due to a combination of factors, including her inability to find a babysitter for her then two-year-old son, her disengaged attitude, and her falling sick during production, Bryant was ultimately replaced by Amelita Ward.

== Later years ==
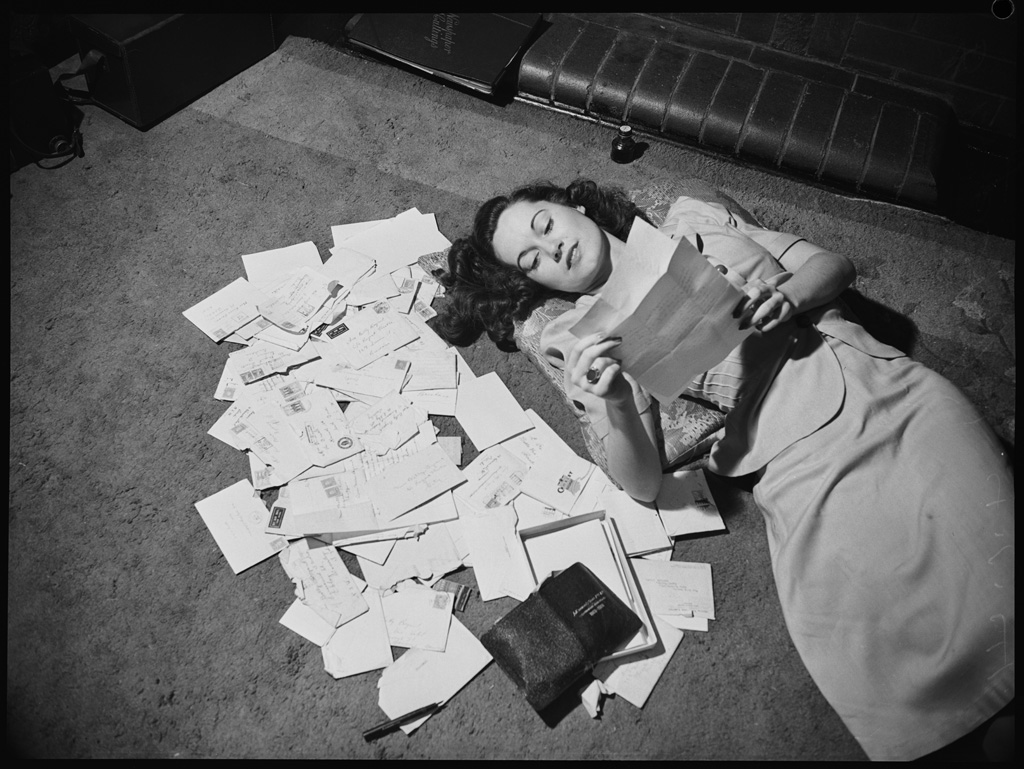
Bryant reading letters from fans in 1941

In her later years, Bryant spent her time campaigning for humanitarian aid. She founded the Foundation for the Peoples of the South Pacific (FSP), now called Counterpart International, together with her husband and Australian Marist priest Stan Hosie in 1966; at the time of her death, the organisation had some sixty branches worldwide. Bryant and Hosie were awarded the Humanitarian Service Award by Hillary Rodham Clinton in 2000. Bryant died on 3 October 2005 in Seattle, Washington, aged 85.
