= Martin Cregier =

Captain Marten Cregier

Burgomaster of New Amsterdam
- In office 1653–1655
- In office 1659–1660
- In office 1663–1664

Alternate Burgomaster
- In office 1660–1661

Personal details
- Born: 1617
- Died: after 1681 (aged around 63–64)
- Spouse: Lysbeth Jans
- Occupation: Tavern keeper, Fur trader, Military officer

Captain Marten Kregier or Cregier (1617–after 1681) most likely originated from Borcken in the Holy Roman Empire and was an early settler of New Amsterdam. He was a prominent citizen of the settlement and served three terms as Burgomaster. Kregier led several successful attacks against the Munsee during the Esopus Wars. Kregier's house and lot stood on Broadway just north of Battery Park and his daughter married Christoffel Hooglant.

In 1643 Kregier built the first public building on Broadway in New York City, a tavern located at present-day 9-11 Broadway. It was later known as Atlantic Gardens and survived until 1860. New York merchants met in the same building in 1765 and signed resolutions to import no more goods from England until the Stamp Act was repealed.

In 1648, Kregier was one of four men appointed as the city's first fire wardens.

Kregier finally settled in Niskayuna, New York on the banks of the Mohawk. His year of death is unknown. Some literature lists 1712 or 1713, but that is likely to be his son, Marten Kregier junior.

== Publications ==
- Krieger, Martin (1663). Journal of the Second Esopus War (PDF). Hudson River Valley Institute. Archived from the original (PDF) on 2011-08-11.
