= Shaupeneak Ridge Cooperative Recreation Area =

Park in New York, US

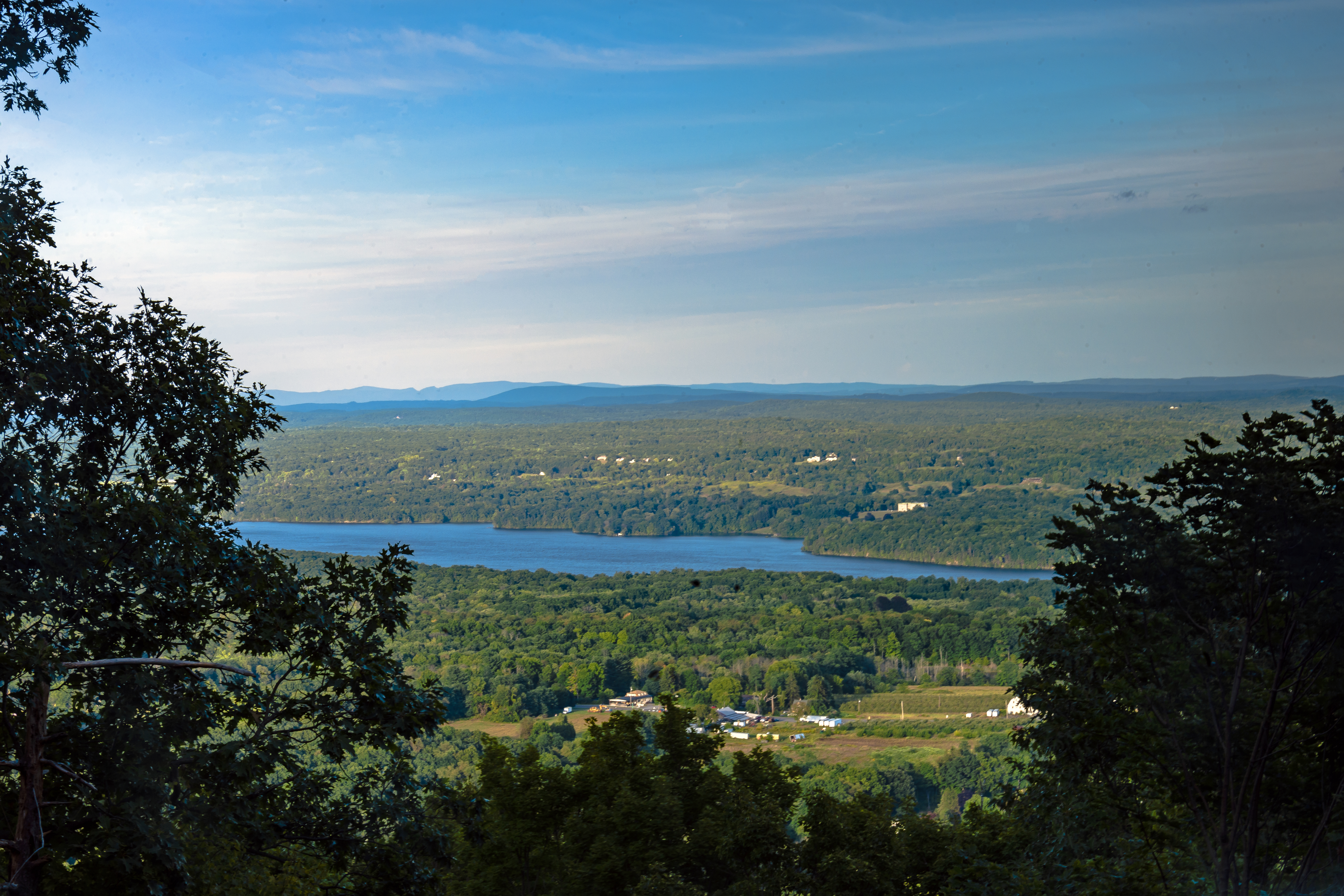
- View of the Hudson River from Shaupeneak Mountain
- Interactive map of Shaupeneak Ridge Cooperative Recreation Area
- Type: Recreation area
- Location: Esopus, New York, United States
- Coordinates: 41°50′14″N 73°59′40″W
- Area: 790 acres (320 ha)
- Created: 1994
- Operator: Scenic Hudson/New York State Department of Environmental Conservation
- Open: All year
- Parking: Two parking areas

Shaupeneak Ridge Cooperative Recreation Area is a 790-acre (320 ha) recreational and protected area in the U.S. state of New York. It is located in the town of Esopus in eastern Ulster County. Shaupeneak Ridge Cooperative Recreation Area (CRA) covers part of the ridge-top, slope, and base of Shaupeneak Mountain, an 892-foot (272 m) high ridge of the Marlboro Mountains, which stretch from Newburgh, New York to Kingston, New York.

Shaupeneak Ridge CRA is owned by the Scenic Hudson Land Trust, a private entity seeking to preserve lands of historic, ecological, and aesthetic significance in the Hudson Valley. However, the property is dually administered by Scenic Hudson and the New York State Department of Environmental Conservation due to an agreement made possible by the New York Fish & Wildlife Management Act (FWMA). By New York State standards, Shaupeneak Ridge CRA is managed similar to a multiple use area, although with somewhat more restrictive use rules. Outdoor activities offered include hiking, fishing, hunting, and cross country skiing.

Trails in Shaupeneak Ridge CRA are well blazed, leading across numerous environs from the meadows at the base of the mountain to rocky overlooks along the ridgeline. Parts of the property lie within what is known as the Shaupeneak Ridge Biologically Important Area, an area recognized by the state of New York for its biodiversity. The lower sections of the Shaupeneak Ridge CRA lie just west of the Esopus/Lloyd Scenic Area of Statewide Significance, with the higher sections having a view across the Scenic Area towards the Hudson River and beyond.

Access to Shaupeneak Ridge Cooperative Recreation Area is possible from a parking lot at the base of Shaupeneak Mountain off of Old Post Road (Ulster County Route 16). An additional parking area is located at the top of the mountain, along Popletown Road.

== See also ==
Nearby recreational/historical areas in the Marlboro Mountains:

- John Burroughs Nature Sanctuary at Slabsides
- Hudson Valley Rail Trail
- Hemlock Ridge Multiple Use Area
