= Highland, Ulster County, New York =

Highland
- Census-designated place
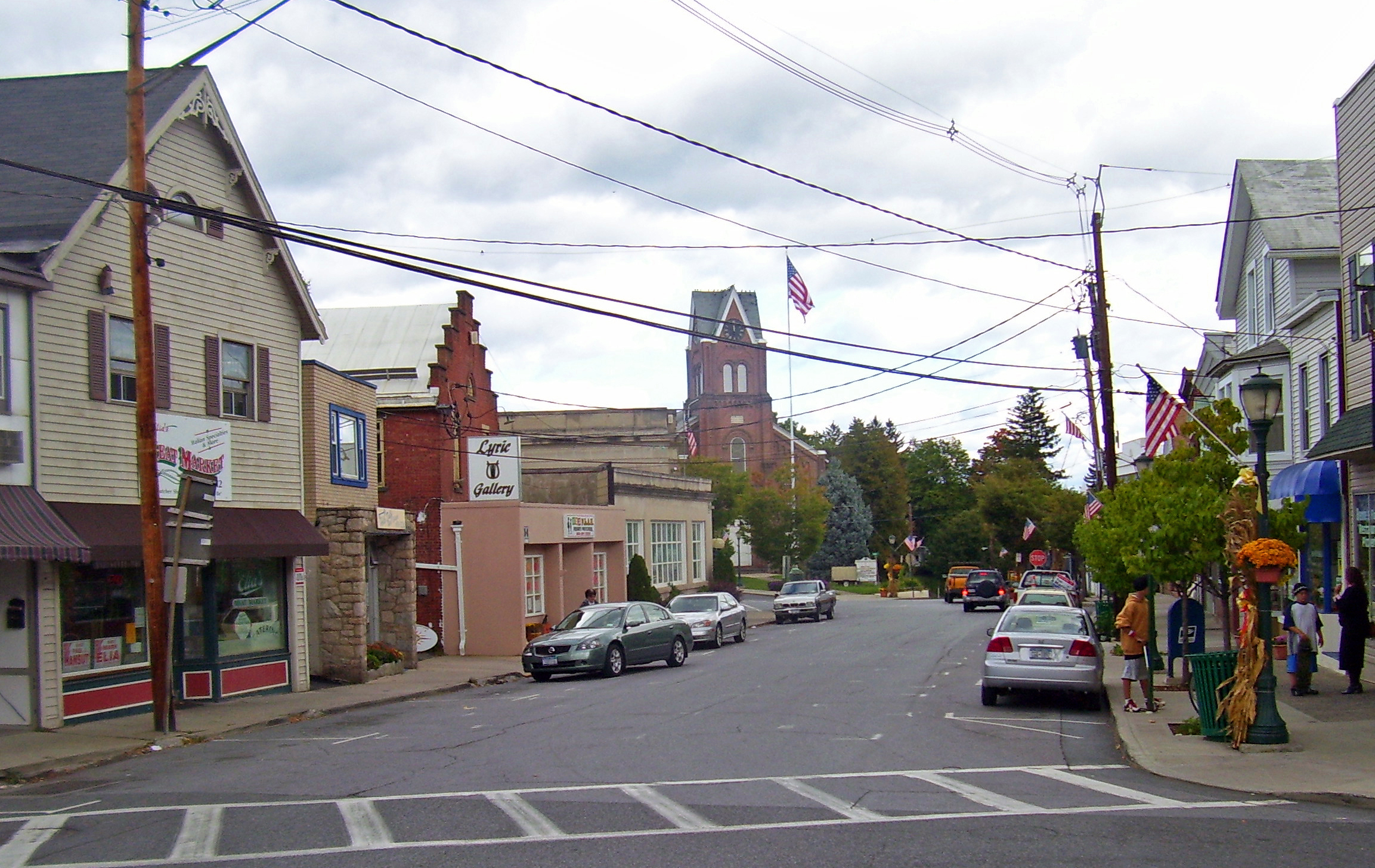
- Downtown Highland

- Location in Ulster County and the state of New York.
- Coordinates: 41°43′6″N 73°57′49″W
- Country: United States
- State: New York
- County: Ulster

Area
  - Total: 5.41 sq mi (14.00 km^{2})
  - Land: 4.70 sq mi (12.17 km^{2})
  - Water: 0.71 sq mi (1.83 km^{2})

Population (2020)
  - Total: 6,385
  - Density: 1,358.8/sq mi (524.65/km^{2})
- Time zone: UTC-5 (EST)
  - Summer (DST): UTC-4 (EDT)
- ZIP codes: 12528
- FIPS code: 36-34484
- GNIS feature ID: 952773

Highland /ˈhaɪˌlænd/ is a hamlet (and census-designated place) in Ulster County, New York, United States. The population was 6,385 at the 2020 census. It is part of the New York City Combined Statistical area.

Highland is a community in the town of Lloyd, on U.S. Route 9W. Routes 44 and 55 run through it as well. It is across the western end of the Mid-Hudson Bridge across from Poughkeepsie.

Highland is at the western end of the Walkway over the Hudson. From there, the Hudson Valley Rail Trail extends westward through the Town of Lloyd on to New Paltz, forming part of the Empire State Trail.

Highland also contains Franny Reese State Park and Highland Landing Park.

== History ==
The Brown–Ellis House and Anthony Yelverton House are listed on the National Register of Historic Places.

== Geography ==
The community is on the west bank of the Hudson River. Illinois Mountain bounds it on the west.

Highland is located at 41°43′6″N 73°57′49″W (41.718357, -73.963590).

According to the United States Census Bureau, the CDP has a total area of 5.1 square miles (13 km^{2}), of which 4.7 square miles (12 km^{2}) is land and 0.3 square miles (0.78 km^{2}) (6.90%) is water.

== Demographics ==
Historical population
Census	Pop.	Note	%±
2000	5,060		—
2010	5,647		11.6%
2020	6,385		13.1%
U.S. Decennial Census

=== 2010 census ===
As of the 2010 census, the population was 5,647. The racial makeup of the town was 84.40% White, 6.94% Black or African American, 0.28% Native American, 3.98% Asian, 0.02% Pacific Islander, 1.84% from other races, and 2.53% from two or more races. Hispanic or Latino of any race were 7.84% of the population.

=== 2020 census ===
As of the 2020 census, the population was 6,385. The racial makeup of the town was 75.60% White, 7.97% Black or African American, 0.27% Native American, 3.73% Asian, 0.06% Pacific Islander, 5.04% from other races, and 7.33% from two or more races. Hispanic or Latino of any race were 11.54% of the population.
