= Esopus Spitzenburg =

Type of apple

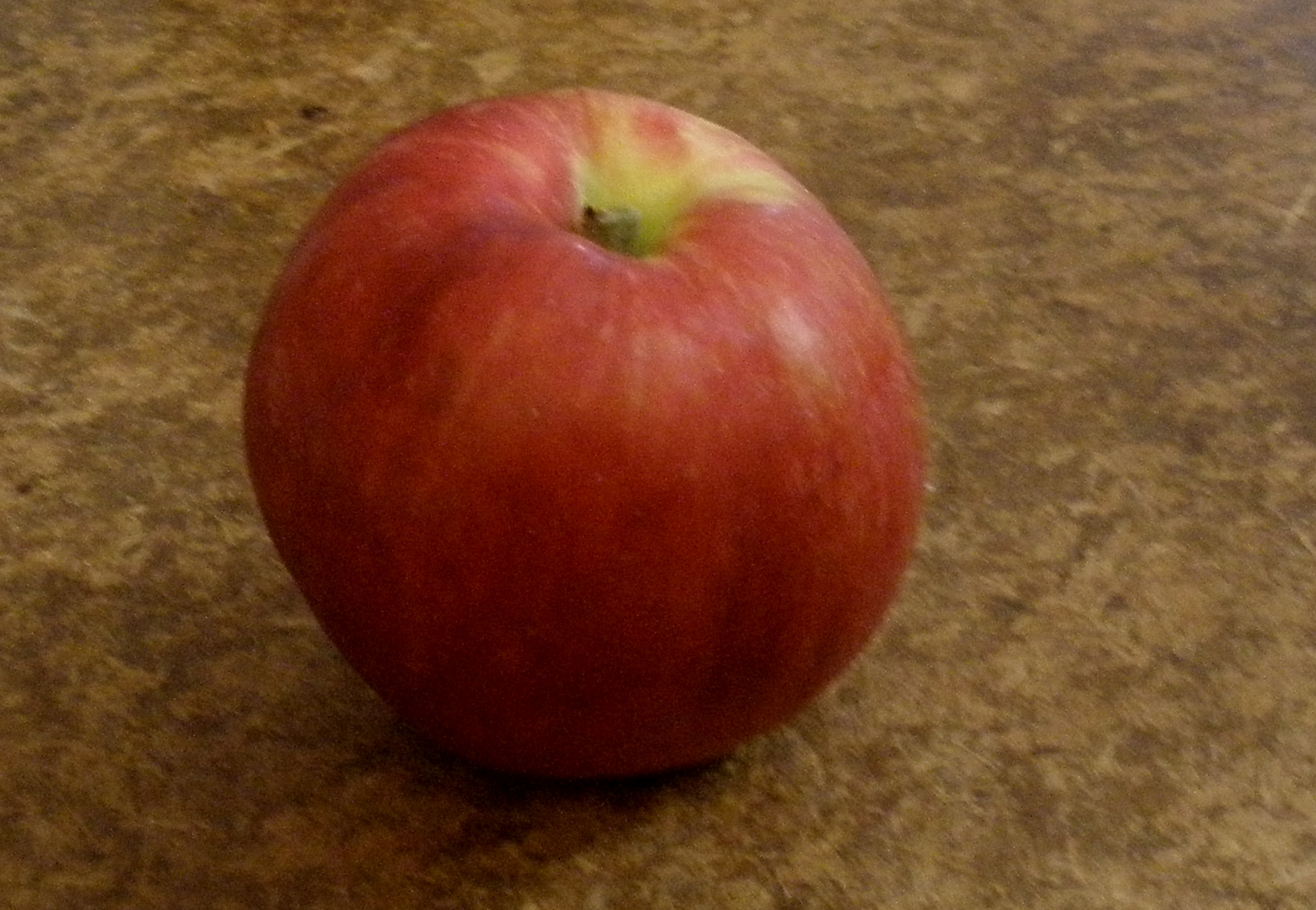
- Species: Malus domestica
- Hybrid parentage: Chance seedling
- Cultivar: Esopus Spitzenburg; Aesopus Spitzenburgh
- Origin: (United States) Esopus, New York, late 18th century

Esopus Spitzenburg or Aesopus Spitzenburgh is a variety of apple. It was discovered early in the 18th century near Esopus, New York and is reputed to have been a favorite apple of Thomas Jefferson, who planted several of the trees at Monticello. While grown and sold commercially in the 19th century and early 20th century, was largely supplanted by other apple varieties for commerce by the mid-20th century. In the 21st century, it is grown largely in heritage orchards that intentionally preserve less common plant varieties.

In 1922, Ulysses Hedrick described Esopus Spitzenburg (sometimes simply called "Spitzenberg") as "one of the leading American apples ... [A]bout the best to eat out of hand, and very good for all culinary purposes as well." In particular, it is a good apple for baking pies and is also valued as a cider apple.

It is fairly large, oblong and has yellow ground color and red overcolor. Flesh yellow firm crisp, juicy. Typical size according to Warder width 73 mm, height 75 mm, according to Downing width 77 mm, height 68 mm. Stalk three-fourths of an inch, slender, inserted in a wide cavity. Calyx small, and closed set in a shallow basin. Like many late-season apples, it improves with a few weeks of cool storage, which brings it to its full, rich flavor. Hedrick praised this apple as attractive and keeping well in cold storage, but added that it was imperfect in that the trees lack vigor and are vulnerable to apple scab. Its young shoots are rather slender, of a dark color. It is distinguished not only by this, but the form of its fruit, and its superior productiveness from the Flushing Spitzenberg.

This cultivar is suitable for hardiness zones 4–7 and should be grown in full sun. However, the trees grow unevenly and sometimes the upper branches shade out the lower ones, which can be frustrating to the orcharder. It also has a biennial bearing tendency, and is susceptible to any available apple disease. This cultivar is a direct lineal descendant of Reinette Franche. Esopus Spitzenburg also gave rise to the cultivar Jonathan, which was used in the breeding of a great many apples.

Herman Melville mentioned this apple in "Bartleby, the Scrivener".

Times to pick, eat and store (Climate of the United States, 1917)
	When to pick	When ripe enough to eat	Latest cold storage limit
Northern states	Oct. 4-23	Nov. 15-25	April 1
Southern states	Sept. 13 - Oct. 3	Oct. 25 - Nov. 15	Feb. 15

== See also ==
- Crimson Gold (apple)
