= Wallkill Valley =

Coordinates: 41°26′N 74°21′W

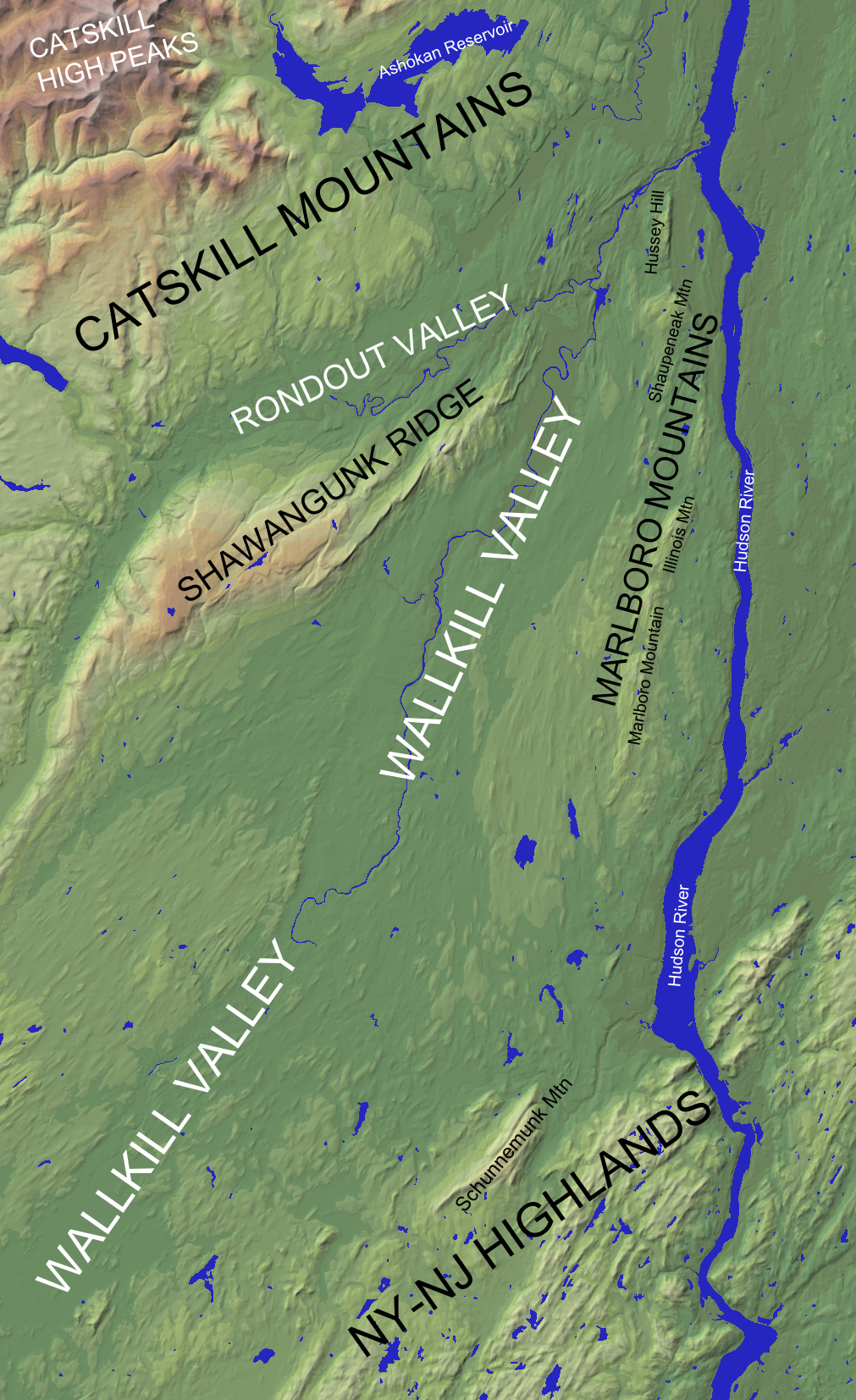
Shaded relief map of the northern Wallkill Valley region

The Wallkill Valley is a broad valley extending through southeastern New York and northwestern New Jersey. It is composed of rolling hills, plains, and swamps (including the Black Dirt Region) surrounding the Wallkill River. The valley is a subdivision of the larger Hudson Valley, bound to the west by the Shawangunk Ridge/Kittatinny Mountains and to the east by the Marlboro Mountains and New York–New Jersey Highlands. The northern Wallkill Valley is sometimes associated with the greater Catskills region, although it is geographically separated from the Catskill Mountains by the Shawangunk Ridge and Rondout Valley. In a broader sense, the Wallkill Valley is part of the Ridge-and-Valley physiographic province of the Appalachian Mountains, while the Catskills further to the north and west are part of the Appalachian Plateau.

== Preservation ==
Since 1987, The Wallkill Valley Land Trust has pursued the goal of preserving open space in the Wallkill Valley region. Projects have included the Wallkill Valley Rail Trail.

== See also ==
- Wallkill Valley Railroad
- Wallkill Valley Rail Trail
