= Sheryl Kaller =

21st century director

Sheryl Kaller is an American theatre director. She is known for her work on the 2010 Broadway play Next Fall, where she was nominated for a Tony Award.

== Early life and education ==
Kaller described her upbringing as a "conservative middle-class Long Island community." She studied theater at Emerson College.

== Career ==
In 2010, Kaller directed Geoffrey Naufft's play Next Fall, which earned her a Tony nomination for Best Director. 2013 saw her directing Roundabout Theatre Company's Underground production of Too Much Too Much Too Many by Meghan Kennedy. In 2014, she directed the Broadway production of Mothers and Sons, a play written by Terrence McNally. She directed Deaf West's production of Our Town at the Pasadena Playhouse in 2017. In 2020, she directed the world premiere of Bliss at Seattle's Fifth Avenue Theatre. In 2024, she directed The White Chip, an off-Broadway autobiographical comedy by Sean Daniels.

Kaller directed the world premiere of musical adaptation of A Walk on the Moon at the Geary Theatre in San Francisco in 2018. In 2026, it was announced that she will direct the off-Broadway production.

Kaller co-founded Two Island Productions, a theatre company based in New York and Bermuda focused on producing original plays. She was also the artistic director of the company.

== Personal life ==
Kaller has a husband, Scott, and two daughters.
