= Lloyd, New York =

- Town
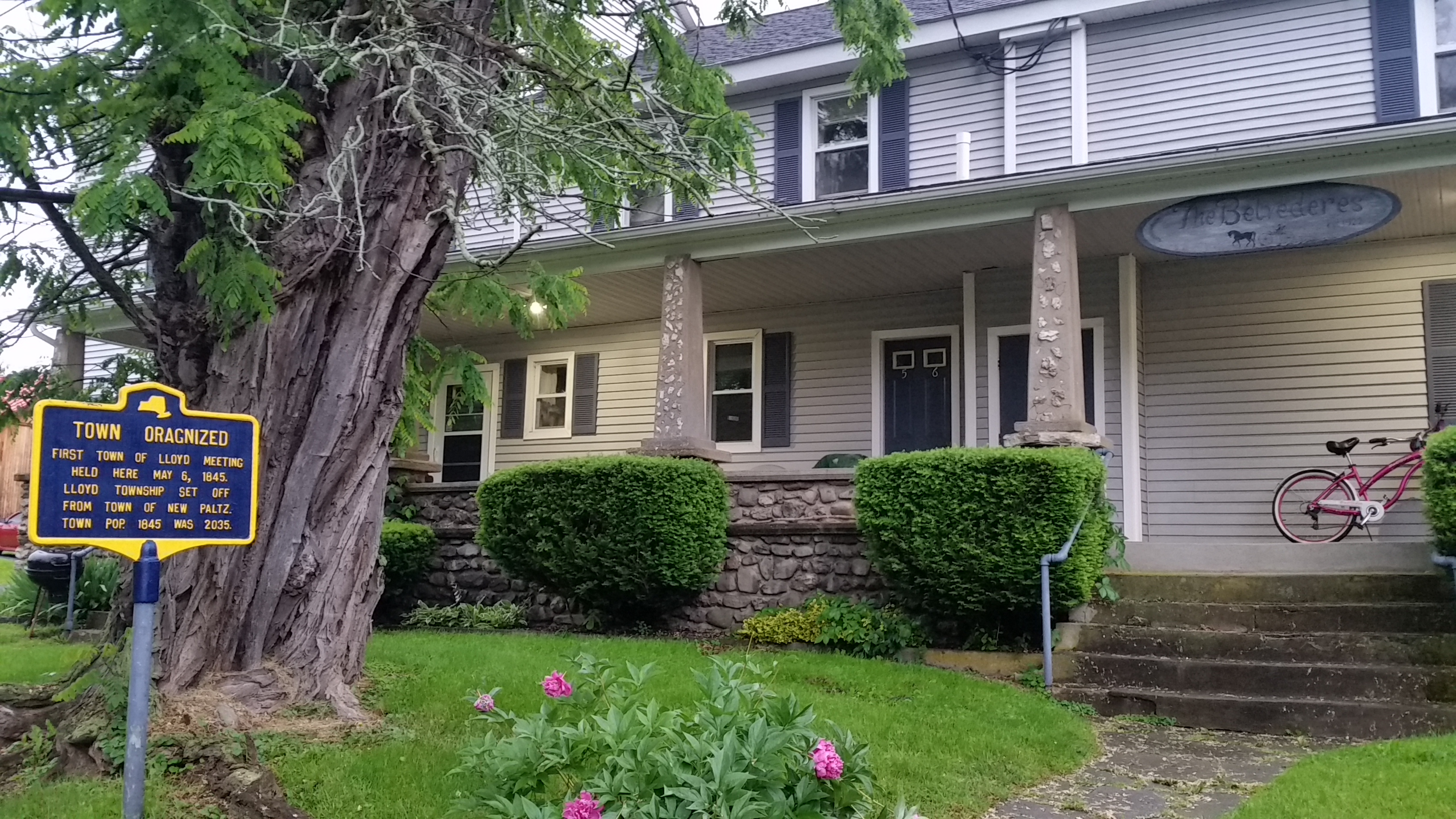
- Historical marker at the site of the town's first meeting in 1845

- Location in Ulster County and the state of New York.
- Coordinates: 41°42′49″N 73°59′47″W
- Country: United States
- State: New York
- County: Ulster

Area
  - Total: 33.29 sq mi (86.21 km^{2})
  - Land: 31.27 sq mi (80.98 km^{2})
  - Water: 2.02 sq mi (5.23 km^{2})
- Elevation: 315 ft (96 m)

Population (2020)
  - Total: 11,133
  - Density: 922.1/sq mi (356.03/km^{2})
- Time zone: UTC-5 (EST)
  - Summer (DST): UTC-4 (EDT)
- ZIP code: 12528
- Area code: 845
- FIPS code: 36-42994
- GNIS feature ID: 0979162
- Website: https://www.townoflloyd.gov/

Lloyd is a town in Ulster County, New York, United States. The population was 11,133 at the 2020 census. It is part of the New York City combined statistical area.

The town of Lloyd is located in the eastern part of Ulster County. U.S. Route 9W runs north and south in the eastern part of the town. The concurrent U.S. Route 44 and NY 55 pass through the southeastern corner of the town. NY 299 also runs east–west across town. Lloyd is on the opposite side of the Hudson River from Poughkeepsie, New York, to which it is linked by the Mid-Hudson Bridge and the Walkway over the Hudson.

== History ==
The town of Lloyd was formed from the town of New Paltz, New York. It was created by an act of the New York State Legislature on April 15, 1845; the first town meeting was held three weeks later, on May 6. The first town officials were selected, including town supervisor Reuben Deyo, justices of the peace Silas Saxton, John B. Howell, and John L. Deyo, with Hasbrouck Lefevre as town clerk.

== Geography ==
According to the United States Census Bureau, the town has a total area of 33.4 square miles (87 km^{2}), of which 31.7 square miles (82 km^{2}) is land and 1.6 square miles (4.1 km^{2}) (4.91%) is water.

The eastern town line is marked by the Hudson River. Black Creek (formerly known as the Swarte Kill) marks the western border of the town, dividing Lloyd from New Paltz.

The lowest point in the town is the shore of the Hudson River, which is at sea level. The highest point is the summit of Illinois Mountain, at 1,125 feet (343 m). Illinois Mountain is part of the Marlboro Mountains, which bisect the town from north to south.

== Demographics ==
Historical population
Census	Pop.	Note	%±
1850	2,035		—
1860	2,499		22.8%
1870	2,658		6.4%
1880	2,713		2.1%
1890	2,516		−7.3%
1900	2,608		3.7%
1910	2,803		7.5%
1920	3,079		9.8%
1930	3,709		20.5%
1940	3,795		2.3%
1950	4,503		18.7%
1960	5,842		29.7%
1970	7,032		20.4%
1980	7,875		12.0%
1990	9,231		17.2%
2000	9,941		7.7%
2010	10,863		9.3%
2020	11,133		2.5%
U.S. Decennial Census

As of the census of 2000, there were 9,941 people, 3,626 households, and 2,429 families residing in the town. The population density was 313.3 inhabitants per square mile (121.0/km^{2}). There were 3,818 housing units at an average density of 120.3 per square mile (46.4/km^{2}). The racial makeup of the town was 90.29% White, 5.22% African American, 0.16% Native American, 1.22% Asian, 0.01% Pacific Islander, 1.30% from other races, and 1.80% from two or more races. Hispanic or Latino people of any race were 5.07% of the population.

There were 3,626 households, out of which 33.0% had children under the age of 18 living with them, 52.6% were married couples living together, 10.8% had a female householder with no husband present, and 33.0% were non-families. 25.0% of all households were made up of individuals, and 7.4% had someone living alone who was 65 years of age or older. The average household size was 2.54 and the average family size was 3.09.

In the town, the population was spread out, with 25.7% under the age of 18, 7.3% from 18 to 24, 30.0% from 25 to 44, 22.5% from 45 to 64, and 14.6% who were 65 years of age or older. The median age was 38 years. For every 100 females, there were 93.3 males. For every 100 females age 18 and over, there were 86.0 males.

The median income for a household in the town was $52,686, and the median income for a family was $61,584. Males had a median income of $40,774 versus $30,286 for females. The per capita income for the town was $22,299. About 5.1% of families and 7.3% of the population were below the poverty line, including 7.7% of those under age 18 and 10.2% of those age 65 or over.

As of the 2010 census, there were 10,863 people in the town. The racial makeup was 86.1% White, 6.4 African American, 0.2% Native American, 2.9% Asian, 0.0% Pacific Islander. Hispanic or Latino people of any race were 7.3%.

== Government ==
The town's government is made up of a supervisor, four council members, two justices, a highway superintendent, a clerk, and a tax collector.

== Communities and locations in Lloyd ==
- Centerville – a hamlet formerly located near the intersection of Pancake Hollow Rd and New Paltz Rd
- Chodikee Lake – small lake near the northern town line, off the former Camp Stutts Rd.
- Clintondale Station – a hamlet in the southwestern part of the town on what is now Station Rd.
- Elting Corners – hamlet west of Highland on Route 299
- Franny Reese State Park – park adjacent to the Hudson River
- Highland – hamlet in the southeastern part of the town on Route 9W, formerly an incorporated village
- Highland Landing – locale southeast of Highland, by the Hudson River
- Illinois Mountain, highest point in town and location of water reservoirs and outdoor recreation
- Oakes – locale in the southeastern part of the town

== Bibliography ==
- Sylvester, Nathaniel Bartlett (1880). History of Ulster County, New York, with Illustrations and Biographical Sketches of its Prominent Men and Pioneers: Part Second: History of the Towns of Ulster County. Philadelphia, PA: Everts & Peck. OCLC 2385957.
