= Ulster Park, New York =

- Hamlet
- Location within New York Location within the United States
- Coordinates: 41°51′21″N 73°58′37″W
- Country: United States
- State: New York
- County: Ulster
- Elevation: 157 ft (48 m)

Population
  - Total: 4,035
- Time zone: UTC-5 (Eastern (EST))
  - Summer (DST): UTC-4 (EDT)
- ZIP code: 12487
- Area code: 845
- GNIS feature ID: 968115

Ulster Park is a hamlet in Ulster County, New York, United States. The community is located near U.S. Route 9W and 5 miles (8.0 km) south of Kingston, in the town of Esopus. Ulster Park has a post office with ZIP code 12487, which opened on November 29, 1847.

Ulster Park was also home to Camp Chi-Wan-Da, a Jewish summer camp where Sandy Koufax, Baseball Hall of Fame pitcher for the Los Angeles Dodgers, spent his summers during his childhood and teenage years.

Located in Ulster Park is also the Esopus Meadows Point Preserve and Education Center. The preserve center is located on the edge of the Hudson River and looks out to the Esopus Lighthouse and the Mills Mansion. The Esopus Meadows Point Preserve also offers multiple simple hiking trails that follow the river.
