= Illinois Mountain =

Mountain in New York, United States

- Location within New York Location within the United States

Highest point
- Elevation: 1,125 feet (343 m)
- Coordinates: 41°43′13″N 73°59′42″W

Geography
- Location: Lloyd, New York, U.S.
- Topo map: USGS Poughkeepsie

Illinois Mountain is a 1,125-foot-tall (343 m) mountain located south of the Catskill Mountains of New York west of Poughkeepsie in the town of Lloyd. Illinois Mountain is north of Marlboro Mountain.

It contains 280 acres of protected parkland with hiking trails, managed by Scenic Hudson.

The Town of Lloyd maintains reservoirs and water infrastructure on the mountain.

There is a radio tower and other towers at the top of the mountain.

There is a gated service road leading to the top.
