= Esopus people =

Historical Native American tribe from New York, U.S.

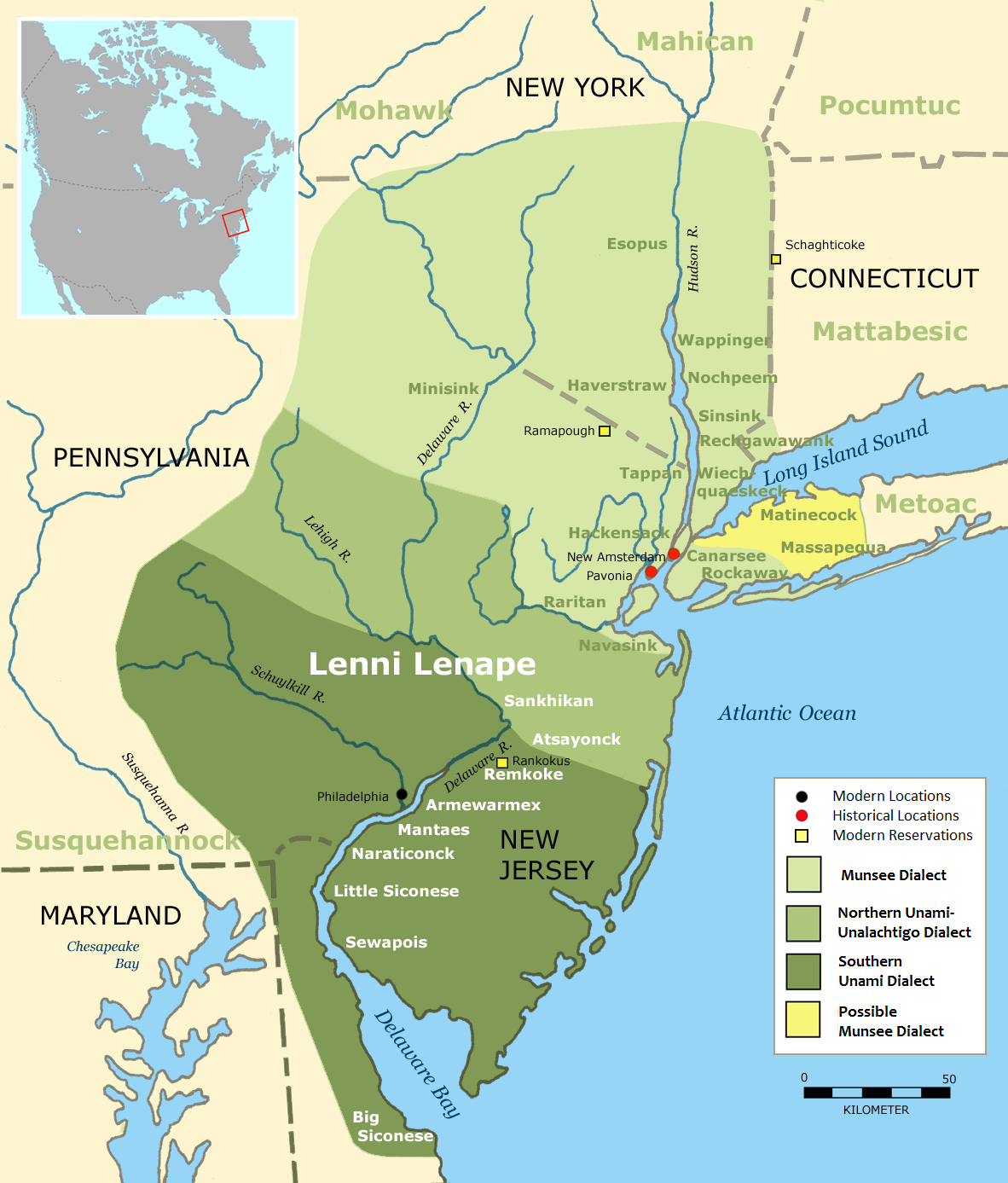
- Map of Lenape lands and tribes showing the Esopus people living in the northern part of the territory west of the Hudson river

Total population
- unknown, descendants are part of the Stockbridge-Munsee Community

Regions with significant populations
- Wisconsin, formerly Hudson Valley

Related ethnic groups
- other Lenape people

The Esopus (es-SOAP-es) were a subgroup of Lenape (Delaware) Native Americans and were native to the Catskill Mountains of what is now the Hudson Valley. Their lands included modern-day Ulster and Sullivan counties.

The Lenape originally resided in the Delaware River Valley before their territory extended into parts of modern-day New York (including the Catskill Mountains and Lower Hudson River Valley), Pennsylvania, New Jersey, and Eastern Delaware. The exact population of the Lenape is unknown but estimated to have been around 10,000 people in 1600. The Esopus people spoke an Algonquian language now called Munsee.

They lived in small communities consisting of 10 to 100 people. They traveled seasonally and settled mostly in clearings by sources of water, developing diverse agricultural practices. The Esopus people's main crop was corn, but they also planted or foraged beans, squash, hickory, nuts, and berries in addition to hunting elk, deer, rabbits, turkey, raccoons, waterfowl, bears, and fish. They generally ate two meals a day according to what was seasonally available.

The average lifespan was generally 35 to 40 years old. Their local leaders known as Sachems were temporary power holders meant to make decisions based on the well-being of their village. Although there were gender roles in their social structure, it was not patriarchal.

== History ==
=== Esopus Wars ===
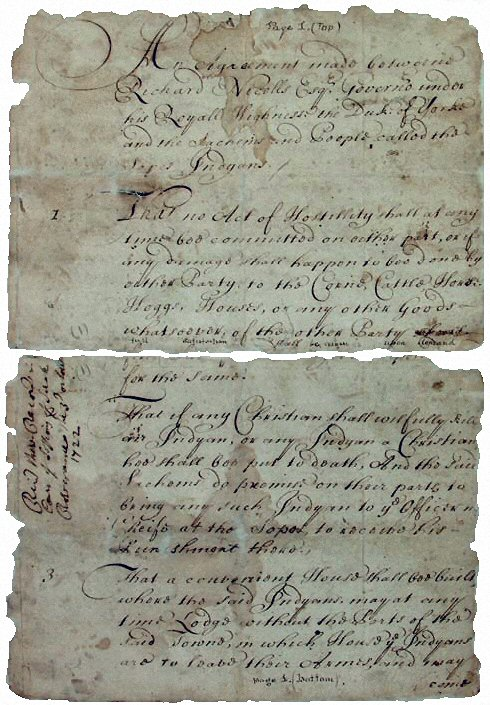
First page of the 1665 treaty, prohibiting violence between "Christians" and "Indyans"

The first interaction between colonists and the Esopus people was recorded in 1609. Historian Herbert C. Kraft believes some Esopus joined the Wappinger Confederacy after Kieft's War in 1643.

In 1652, the Esopus tribe sold 72 acres of land to New Netherland through the Thomas Chambers land deed in Kingston, New York. It is unknown whether the two Esopus sachems at the time, Kawachhikan and Sowappekat, understood the transaction, as in addition to a language barrier, their culture had foundational differences in understanding money, ownership, and Dutch legal transactions. Evidently, Kawachhikan had a different understanding of the transaction because seventeen years later, in September 1669, he formally complained to the newly installed British about non-payment for the land but relented when the original bill of sale was presented. This deed began dispossession of their homeland which continued through the Peter Stuyvesant Stockade of 1658, the Fisher/Rutgers Land Deed of 1682, and land seizures throughout the eighteenth century.

The Esopus fought a series of conflicts against settlers from the New Netherland colony from September 1659 to September 1663, known as the Esopus Wars, in and around Kingston. At the conclusion of the conflict, the tribe sold large tracts of land to French Huguenot refugees in New Paltz and other communities.

The Esopus Wars devastated many Lenape communities in what is now Ulster County. Populations dwindled through warfare with Dutch and French settlers, in addition to widespread disease, with smallpox being the most deadly. Intertribal warfare exacerbated casualties.

=== Esopus people today ===
After the Esopus wars, many Stockbridge-Munsee moved to Western New York near Oneida Lake. They were eventually pushed off these lands by the Indian Removal Treaties in the 19th century, and eventually forced to settle on “inhospitable land” in Wisconsin by the 1830s.

Today, descendants of the Esopus now live on the Stockbridge-Munsee Community reservation in Shawano County, Wisconsin and among the Munsee-Delaware Nation of Ontario, Canada.

== See also ==
- Esopus Wars
