= Marlboro Mountains =

Mountain in the United States

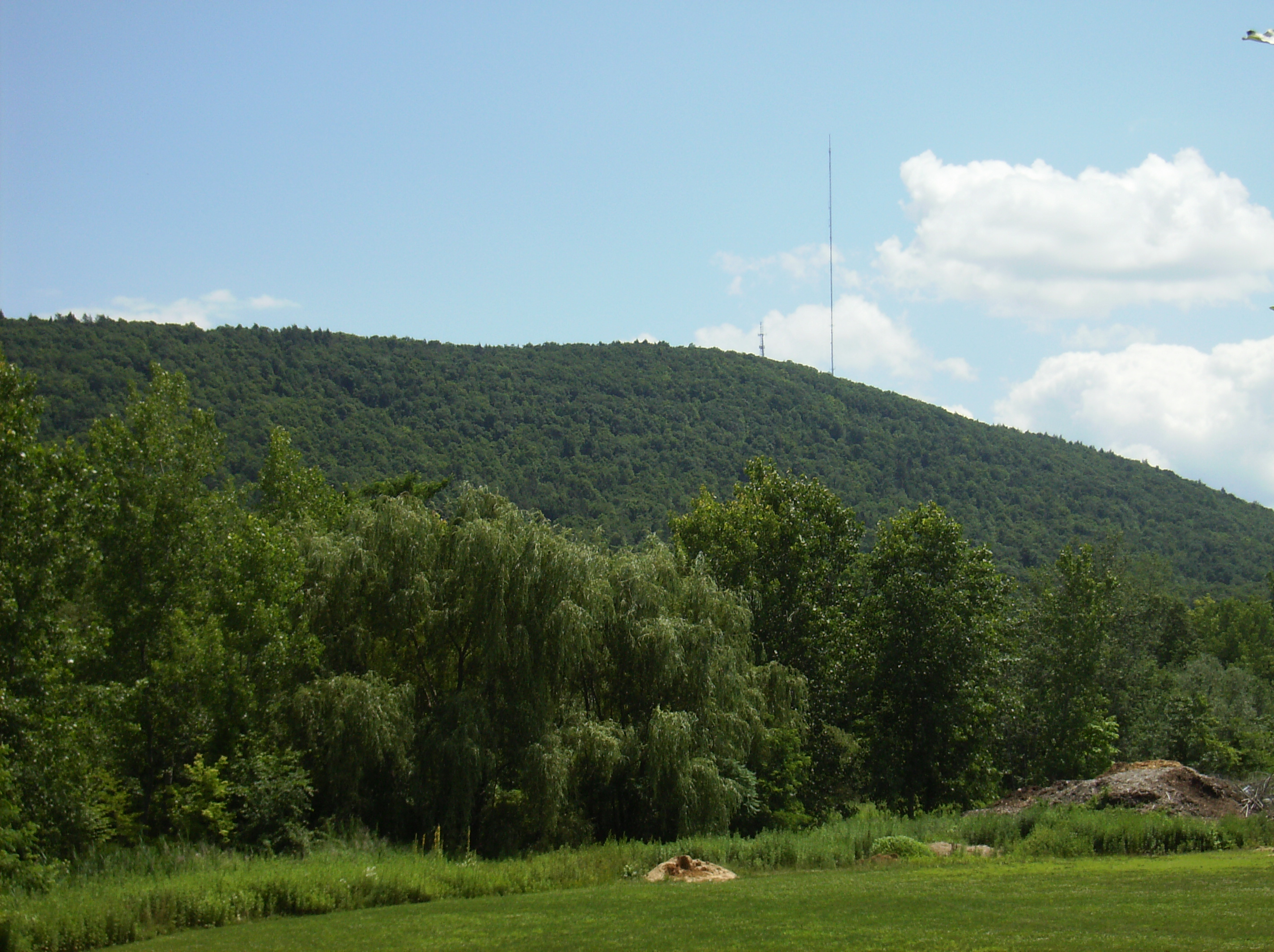
- Illinois Mountain, the second highest ridge of the Marlboro Mountains, seen from Tony Williams Park in Lloyd, New York.

Highest point
- Peak: Marlboro Mountain
- Elevation: 1,127 ft (344 m)
- Coordinates: 41°40′43.31″N 74°00′43.6″W

Dimensions
- Length: 25 mi (40 km) north–south

Geography
- Country: United States
- State: New York

Geology
- Rock age: Ordovician
- Rock type: Sedimentary

The Marlboro Mountains, sometimes Marlborough Mountains, are a group of hogbacked mountains arranged in a 25-mile-long (40 km) ridge extending from Newburgh, New York, to just south of Kingston, New York. Considered to be part of the Ridge and Valley Appalachians, the mountains, which reach elevations over 1,100 feet, form an imposing geologic barrier just west of the Hudson River. They subdivide the relatively flat Hudson River Valley (a section of the Great Appalachian Valley) to create the Wallkill Valley further west. Rising abruptly on their eastern flanks, the Marlboro Mountains are known for their sweeping views of the region.

== Geography ==
The Marlboro Mountains form a broken ridgeline running from the Ulster–Orange County border in the south to the mouth of Rondout Creek in the north. The southernmost 9 miles (14 km) of the ridge form Marlboro Mountain, the namesake mountain of the range. Just north of the Marlboro Mountain ridge is Bailey's Gap, which separates Marlboro Mountain from the 3 1/2-mile-long (5.6 km) Illinois Mountain. North of Illinois Mountain there is a half-mile-wide break in the ridgeline before it slowly rises to a series of unnamed hilltops west of West Park, New York. North of this section is Shaupeneak Mountain, which bends to the north-northwest before reaching an area known as The Hell, a gap in the ridge through which a creek flows. North of this gap is Hussey Hill, which stretches to an area west of Port Ewen, New York, marking the northernmost limit of the Marlboro Mountains.

== Toponymy ==
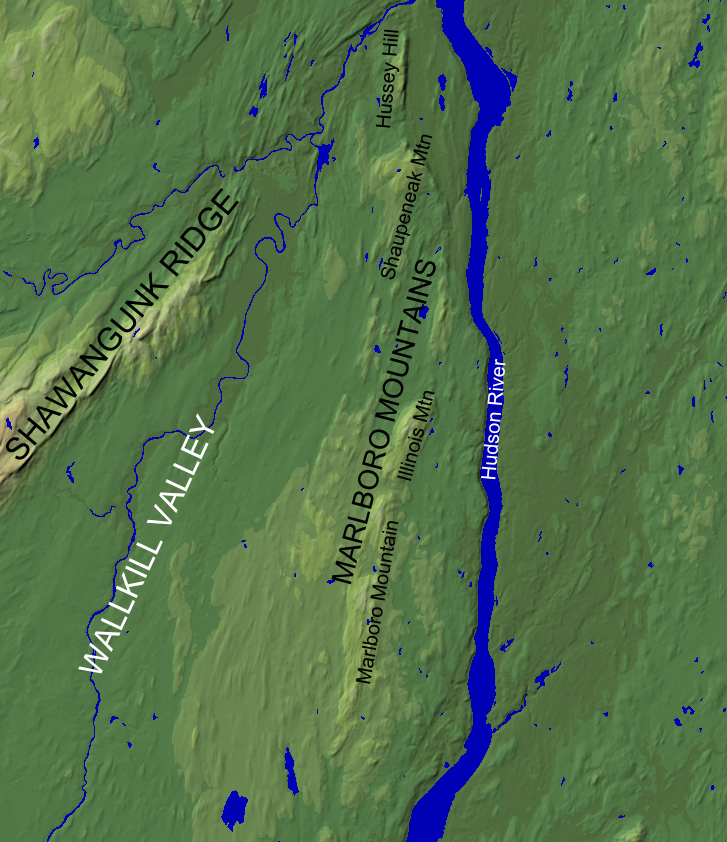
Shaded relief map of the Marlboro Mountains region

The name “Marlboro” is a variant of the English “Marlborough”. In the case of the mountains, the name comes from the Duke of Marlborough, for whom the town of Marlborough, New York, is named.

The names of the individual ridges of the Marlboro Mountains have both European and Native American roots:

Hussey Hill is named for Frederick Hussey, a Dutch colonial settler who in 1685 had an interest in a 2,900-acre tract of land which extended to the foot of the hill.

Shaupeneak Mountain features a Native American name of Munsee Lenape origin. The name is derived from a waterfall, Shaupeneak Falls, located on the mountain's slope. The three syllables which comprise “shau-pe-neak” are thought to be defined as follows: shau (probably short for Asho-, as in Ashokan), meaning forceful or hard current/rapids; pe, meaning water; and neak (likely ny-ak), meaning a prominent point of land. Taken together, the syllables in the name “Shaupeneak” probably mean something like ‘waterfall on the prominence’.

Illinois Mountain is named for the state of Illinois. During the early 1800s, there was a westward migration of New Englanders to the area of the former Northwest Territory, which included Illinois and Ohio. Some settlers, however, never reached their intended destination, being cut off by the swamps just west of the Marlboro Mountains. Setting up homesteads in the area, the settlers named local places and geographic features after the lands they never reached. Ohioville, New York is an example of another area with the same etymological lineage.

== History ==
Though occupied and utilized by people for thousands of years, the Marlboro Mountains, which have historically provided timber, game, and agricultural land, were more intensely exploited for their resources in the past two centuries than at any other time in human history. Today, due to a decline in agriculture and logging in the mountains, some of the ridges have begun reverting to a more natural state. An information board erected by the Scenic Hudson Land Trust at the ridge-top parking area of the Shaupeneak Ridge Cooperative Recreation Area summarizes the history of human impact on the mountains, with emphasis on the Shaupeneak Ridge:

MARLBORO MOUNTAINS: SHAPED BY PEOPLE. Humans too have worked on the Marlboro Mountains. Long ago they logged most of the mountain’s hemlock trees to tan leather. They planted fields and orchards whose outlines can still be traced through stone walls running deep through the forest. In fact, Shaupeneak Ridge was once a populated area known as Poppletown. Today, cell towers atop the ridge add a new and controversial human presence to the landscape. Yet despite many intrusions, Shaupeneak’s busy natural workshop has staged a remarkable comeback. Today it is closer to its natural condition than at any time during the last 200 years.
–Scenic Hudson Land Trust

In addition to their consumable resources, the mountains have provided quiet solitude and escape. It is in the Marlboro Mountains that naturalist and essayist John Burroughs, with the aid of his son Julian, constructed Slabsides, a cabin retreat which he used in the summer.

=== Hussey Hill Gold ===
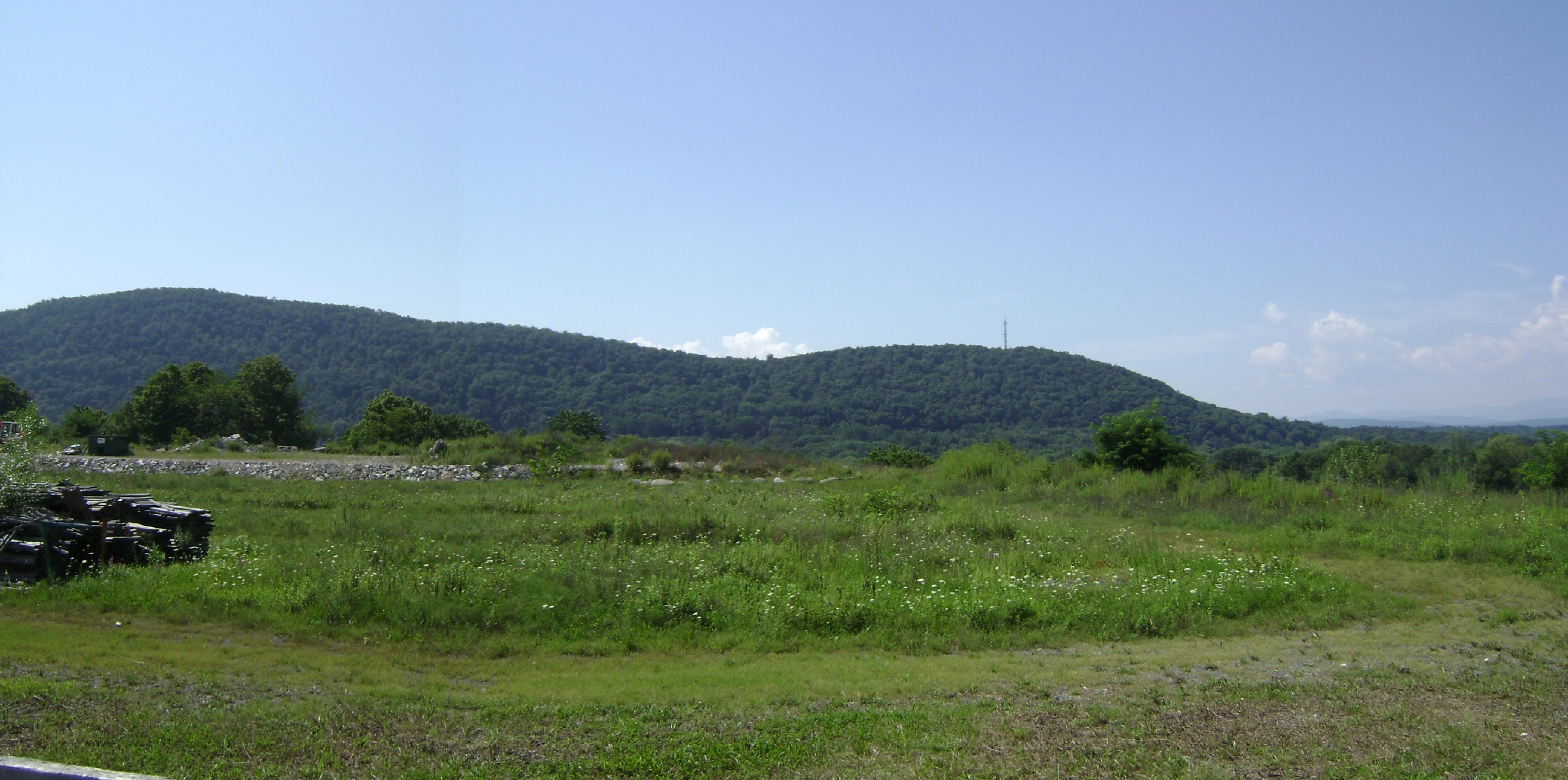
Hussey Hill seen from Port Ewen, New York

A series of infamous events in the history of the Marlboro Mountains and the town of Esopus involves gold mining operations at Hussey Hill. In the 1870s, a Kingston chemist and physician, Edgar Eltinge, claimed that he had found gold at Hussey Hill. Though locals doubted his find, Eltinge, along with another man, Royal Dimmick, bought a lease on the hill. After forming the Hudson River Gold & Silver Mining Company the two began mining for gold in 1877.

Ultimately, the men claimed to find gold-bearing quartz. However, the gold that was found was supposedly not enough to make up for recovery costs, the mine closing after just eighteen months. Later, in an odd twist, Dimmick's son claimed to develop a second sight which allowed him to sense gold deposits. The Dimmicks would lead Eltinge and others on fruitless gold finding expeditions in the Shawangunks and Catskills, leaving their followers broke.

In 1879, the owners of the land on Hussey Hill granted a lease to Simon S. Westbrook, who had purchased the Hudson River Gold & Silver Mining Company's equipment at foreclosure. Westbrook became involved with the Home Gold and Silver Mining Company, which established offices in Esopus and New York City. The company quickly acquired two million dollars in investment funds to work the mine on Hussey Hill. Much of this funding was raised through public viewings of weekend dig operations directed by a company sales associate. As with Eltinge and Dimmick, no appreciable gold was ever verifiably found, and none of the gold supposedly produced was ever shown.

The last gasp of gold fever at Hussey Hill occurred in 1891. A farmer, Conrad Burger, claimed he discovered a rock on his farm at the base of Hussey Hill which contained gold. A sample of the rock was sent to New York City to verify the claim, and it was judged to actually contain gold. However, whether the rock came from Hussey Hill is questionable. In spite of this fact, Burger managed to sell a twenty-year lease to three men hoping to strike gold on his property.

== Geology ==
The Marlboro Mountains are primarily formed of shallow marine/delta sediments deposited during the late Ordovician, approximately 450 million years ago. After millions of years, these sediments have been titled and uplifted. Weathering has removed more easily eroded material surrounding the mountains, producing their modern topographic relief.

Structurally, the Marlboro Mountains constitute a geologic formation known as a dip slope. The sedimentary layers comprising the bulk of the mountains dip towards the west, with a hard cap rock layer at the surface. The ridgeline of the mountains forms the edge of the cap rock layer, which is being eroded relatively slowly, protecting underlying geologic layers from being weathered. This setup leads to the hogback appearance of the mountains: gently sloping westward flanks and steeply graded eastern flanks.

The hard cap rock layer responsible for the mountains' topography is composed of rock of the Quassaic Group (named after Quassaic Creek), a geologic group consisting of hard sandstone and quartzite. Quartzite, which consists of sandstone that has been recrystallized, is naturally resistant to erosion. This type of rock is common to other ridges in the Appalachian Mountains.

== Recreation ==
The Marlboro Mountains provide numerous outdoor activities to the Mid Hudson Valley, including hiking, cross country skiing, and fishing.

Recreation areas, nature sanctuaries, and trails from north to south:

- Shaupeneak Ridge Cooperative Recreation Area
- John Burroughs Nature Sanctuary at Slabsides
- Hudson Valley Rail Trail
- Hemlock Ridge Multiple Use Area

Recently, new land has been preserved on Illinois Mountain by the Scenic Hudson organization. Trail building on Illinois Mountain is currently ongoing, having started in June, 2011. It is proposed that hikers and cyclists will be able to reach the summit of Illinois Mountain from the Hudson Valley Rail Trail.
