= Esopus Wars =

1659–1663 conflict of the American Indian Wars

- Part of the American Indian Wars
| Date | September 1659 – September 1663 |
| Location | New Netherland |
| Result | Dutch victory |

Belligerents
| Dutch settlers Iroquois Confederacy | Esopus tribe of Lenape Natives |

Commanders and leaders
| Captain Martin Cregier | Chief Papequanaehen |

The Esopus Wars were two conflicts between the Esopus tribe of Lenape Natives (Delaware) and New Netherlander colonists during the latter half of the 17th century in Ulster County, New York. The first battle was instigated by settlers; the second war was the continuation of a grudge on the part of the Esopus tribe.

== Background ==
Before European colonization, the Kingston area was inhabited by the Esopus people, a Lenape tribe which was estimated to number around 10,000 people living in small village communities by 1600.

In 1609, Henry Hudson explored the river bearing his name, leading to the first contact between the Esopus people and Europeans. Dutch settlers built a factorij (trading post) in Kingston, New York in 1614. The Esopus tribe used the land for farming, and they destroyed the post and drove the settlers back to the south. Colonists established a new settlement in 1652 at Kingston, but the Esopus drove them out again. The settlers returned once again in 1658, as they believed the land to be good for farming. They built a stockade (at 41.9338°N 74.0197°W) to defend the village and named the colony Wiltwijck. Skirmishes continued, but the Esopus were not able to repel the settlers, and they eventually granted the land to the Europeans.

== First Esopus War ==
The First Esopus War was a short-lived conflict between Dutch settlers and the Esopus Natives from September 20, 1659 and July 15, 1660. An incident occurred where a group of Dutch settlers opened fire on a group of Esopus around a campfire, who had been celebrating with brandy given as payment for farm work. Esopus reinforcements raided Dutch settlements outside the stockade, destroying crops, killing livestock, and burning buildings. The war party later besieged the walled settlement of Wiltwijck.

The colonists were outnumbered and had little hope of winning through force, but they managed to hold out and make some small attacks, including burning the Natives' fields to starve them out. They received reinforcements from New Amsterdam. The war concluded July 15, 1660, when the Natives agreed to trade land for food. However, tensions remained between the Esopus and the settlers, eventually leading to a second war.

== Second Esopus War ==
Emissaries from the colony contacted the tribe on June 5, 1663 and requested a meeting in hopes of making a treaty. The Esopus replied that it was their custom to conduct peace talks unarmed and in the open, so the settlers kept the gates open into Wiltwijck. The Esopus arrived on June 7 in great numbers, many claiming to be selling produce, thereby infiltrating deep into the town as scouts. Meanwhile, Esopus warriors completely destroyed the neighboring village of Nieu Dorp (Hurley, New York) unbeknownst to the colonists in Wiltwijck. The Esopus scouts had spread themselves around the town and suddenly began their own attack. They took the settlers completely by surprise and soon controlled much of the town, setting fire to houses and kidnapping women before being driven out by the settlers. The attackers escaped, and the settlers repaired their fortifications. On June 16, Dutch soldiers transporting ammunition to the town were attacked on their way from Rondout Creek, but they repelled the Esopus.

Throughout July, colonial forces reconnoitered the Esopus Kill. They were unable to distinguish one tribe from another, and they captured some traders from the Wappinger tribe, one of whom agreed to help them. He gave them information about various Native forces and served as a guide in the field. In spite of his help, the colonists were unable to make solid contact with the Esopus, who used guerilla tactics and could disappear easily into the woods. After several unproductive skirmishes, the colonists managed to gain the help of the Mohawk, who served as guides, interpreters, and warriors. By the end of July, the colonists had received sufficient reinforcements to march for the Esopus stronghold in the mountains to the north. However, their ponderous equipment made progress slow, and the terrain was difficult. They recognized their disadvantage and burned the surrounding fields in the hope of starving them out, rather than making a direct attack on the Esopus force.

For the next month, scouting parties went out to set fire to the Esopus fields but found little other combat. In early September, another colonial force tried to engage the Esopus on their territory, this time successfully. The battle ended with the death of Chief Papequanaehen and several others. The Esopus fled, and the colonists led by Captain Martin Cregier pillaged their fort before retreating, taking supplies and prisoners. This effectively ended the war, although the peace was uneasy.

== Outcome ==
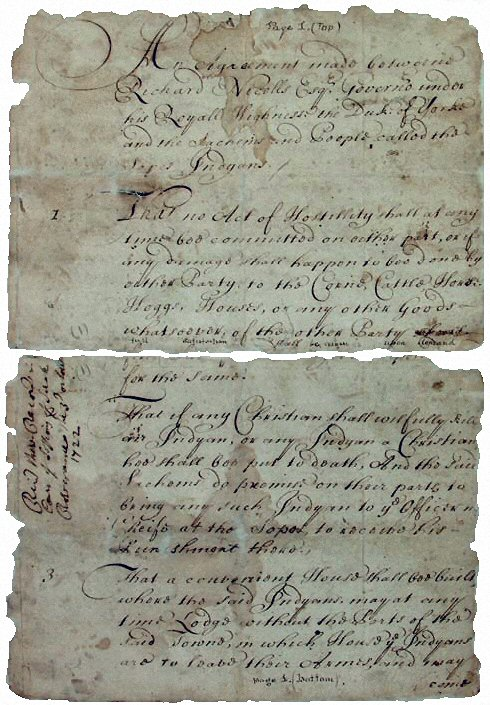
First page of the 1665 treaty between the British colonies and the Esopus tribe forbidding hostility between Christians and Indians, including harming livestock and buildings

The Dutch settlers remained suspicious of all Natives with whom they came into contact and expressed misgivings about the intentions of the Wappingers and even the Mohawks, who had helped them defeat the Esopus. Colonial prisoners taken captive by the Native in the Second Esopus War were transported through regions that they had not yet explored, and they described the land to the colonial authorities who set out to survey it. Some of this land was later sold to French Huguenot refugees who established the village of New Paltz.

In September 1664, the Dutch ceded New Netherland to the English. The English colonies redrew the boundaries of Native territory, paid for land that they planned to settle, and forbade any further settlement on the established Native lands without full payment and mutual agreement. The new treaty established safe passage for both settler and Native for purposes of trading. It further declared "that all past Injuryes are buryed and forgotten on both sides," promised equal punishment for settlers and Native found guilty of murder, and paid traditional respects to the sachems and their people. Over the course of the next two decades, Esopus lands were bought up and the Natives moved out peacefully, eventually taking refuge with the Mohawks north of the Shawangunk mountains .
