= Rosendale (CDP), New York =

Rosendale, New York Rosendale Village, Rosendale Hamlet
- Hamlet & CDP
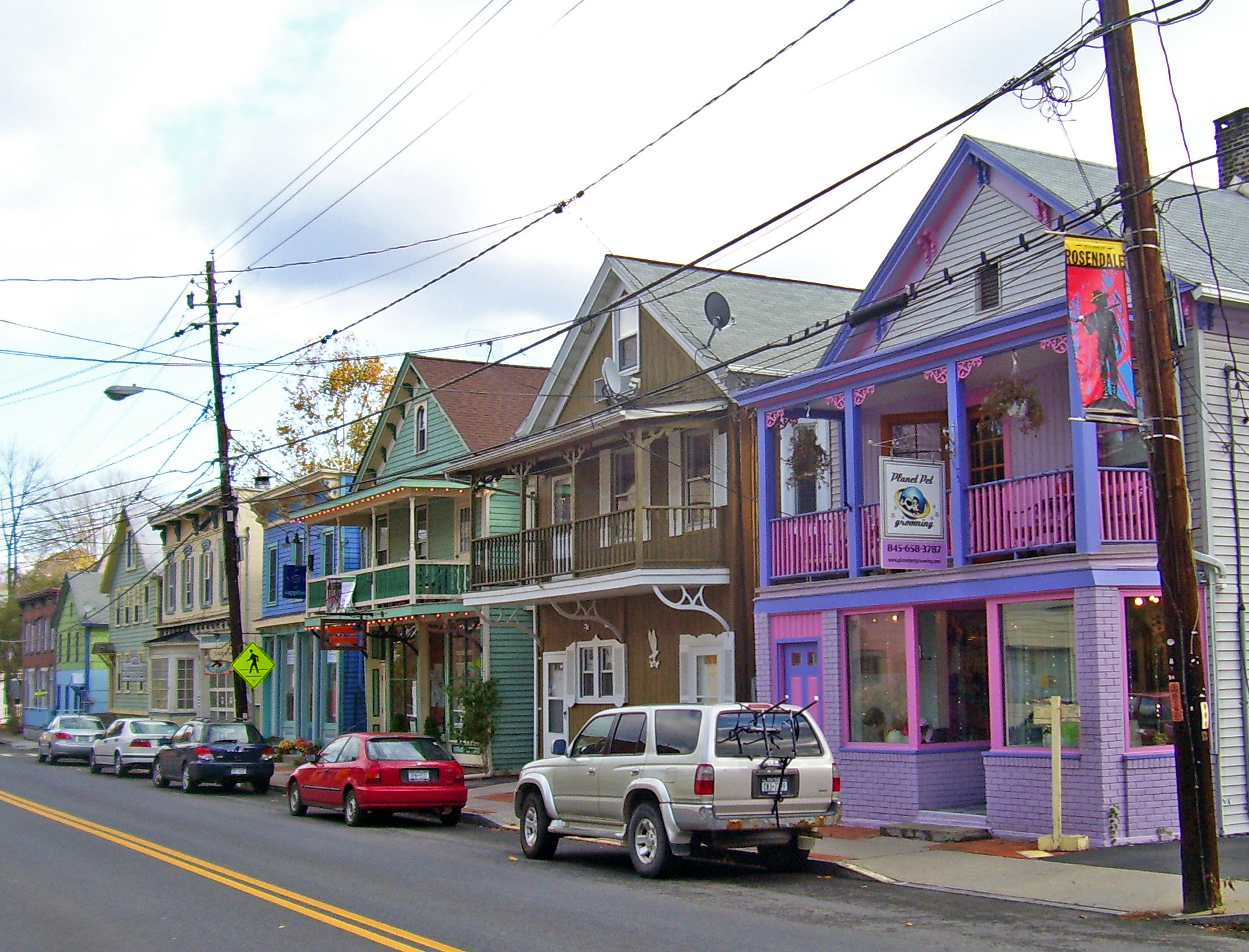
- Restored period buildings along Main Street (NY 213)

- Location in Ulster County and the state of New York.
- Coordinates: 41°50′53″N 074°04′34″W
- Country: United States
- State: New York
- Region: Hudson Valley
- County: Ulster County
- Town: Town of Rosendale
- Settled: 1680
- Incorporated: 1890
- Dissolved: December 31, 1977

Government
  - Type: Unincorporated

Area
  - Total: 2.00 sq mi (5.19 km^{2})
  - Land: 1.95 sq mi (5.04 km^{2})
  - Water: 0.054 sq mi (0.14 km^{2})
- Elevation: 130 ft (40 m)

Population (2020)
  - Total: 1,285
  - Density: 660.0/sq mi (254.81/km^{2})
- Time zone: UTC-5 (Eastern (EST))
  - Summer (DST): UTC-4 (EDT)
- ZIP Code: 12472
- Area code: 845
- FIPS code: 36-63742
- GNIS feature ID: 2389777
- Exchanges: 658
- Website: www.townofrosendale.com

Rosendale is a hamlet located in the Town of Rosendale in Ulster County, New York, United States. The population was 1,285 at the 2020 census. It was also a census-designated place known as Rosendale Village until 2010, when the U.S. Census Bureau designated it Rosendale Hamlet. Some maps continue to list the place as just Rosendale. As of 2020, the "Hamlet" in the CDP name was dropped.

The area was originally settled in the late 17th century by Jacob Rutsen, a merchant from Albany, but did not become a major population center until the 1825 discovery of Rosendale cement in the region; the development of the cement industry, and the growth of the Delaware and Hudson Canal along the Rondout Creek and Main Street, gave rise to substantial economic development in Rosendale. The town's cement was used in the construction of numerous national landmarks. The Wallkill Valley Railroad reached the village in 1871, and its depot in the village was the largest station on the Wallkill Valley line. Rosendale was formally incorporated as a village in 1890.

An 1895 fire destroyed half the village, as it had no form of fire protection at that time. Throughout the 20th century, the decline of the natural cement industry caused Rosendale to suffer economically and lose population. The village was also battered by a series of severe floods, and the center of commerce began to shift from Main Street to Route 32. By the 1970s the village was having severe problems with its utilities and tax code, and was no longer producing cement. The hippie movement brought many artists to the village during this time, which led to ideological clashes between the newcomers and the more conservative, established residents. In 1976, the village voted to dissolve itself to solve its municipal problems, and on January 1, 1978, Rosendale became disincorporated. The village's mayor at the time of the vote viewed the dissolution as a work of conceptual art, and published a book on the matter.

After the disincorporation, the commercial center of the former village was revitalized by artists and entrepreneurs, who purchased and restored Main Street buildings that had fallen into disrepair. Since the 1990s, Rosendale has hosted many street festivals. The former village has had a number of notable buildings, including four churches. Two notable bridges span the Rondout Creek in the village: a road bridge that carries Route 32, and the Rosendale trestle, a former railroad bridge that was renovated as a pedestrian walkway. Joppenbergh Mountain, named after Rosendale's founder, borders the village and has been the site of numerous ski jumping competitions and mine collapses.

== History ==
=== Early settlement ===
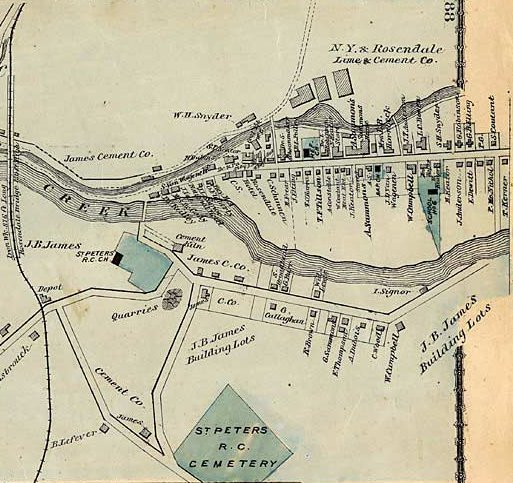
An 1875 map of the area constituting the former village of Rosendale

The earliest recorded human habitation in Rosendale was a Native American village, which included a cemetery, centered around a spring that no longer exists. The first person of European descent to settle the Rosendale area was a merchant from Albany, Jacob Rutsen (originally Jacobsen Rutger van Schoonderwoerdt). Rutsen received a patent on October 8, 1677, for a 40-acre (16 ha) tract of land, located in what is now Rosendale, after purchasing it from a local Indian named Anckerop. Anckerop agreed to the sale on the condition that he be allowed, "the right to plant ... maize annually for the duration of his life", and that Rutsen would plow the involved fields.

Dirck (also spelled Direk) Keyser secured a lease to the land from Rutsen on June 17, 1680, and built the first house in Rosendale; the terms of Keyser's lease stipulated that he build a stone house on the property at the base of what is now Joppenbergh Mountain. On June 23, 1682, fifteen members of the Esopus tribe sold Rutsen more land, by the Rondout Creek. This land was surveyed by Philip Wells on May 28, 1685; Wells declared the size of the purchase to be 395 acres (160 ha) south of the creek, and 240 acres (97 ha) to the north. There was also a 12-acre (4.9 ha) island within the creek. Rutsen was given a patent for the combined area on August 26, 1686.

In 1700, Rutsen took the house from Keyser and expanded it. The settlement was known as "Rosendall" as early as 1700, and was also called "Roasendale" in documents as early as May 28, 1685. The name is thought to be either a reference to wild roses growing throughout the region, or of Dutch origin, as the word existed in period documents from the Netherlands. After Rutsen's death in 1730, he was buried in the area which eventually became the village. His tombstone eulogizes him as the "Founder of Rosendale".

The village remained sparsely populated and only consisted of two houses when the Delaware and Hudson Canal reached it after the materials used to manufacture Rosendale cement, named after the town, were discovered locally in 1825. Early settlers had avoided the area because the northern land, comprising present-day Rosendale Village, was a known floodplain, and the lands south of the creek were less mountainous and at a higher elevation.

=== Industrial growth ===
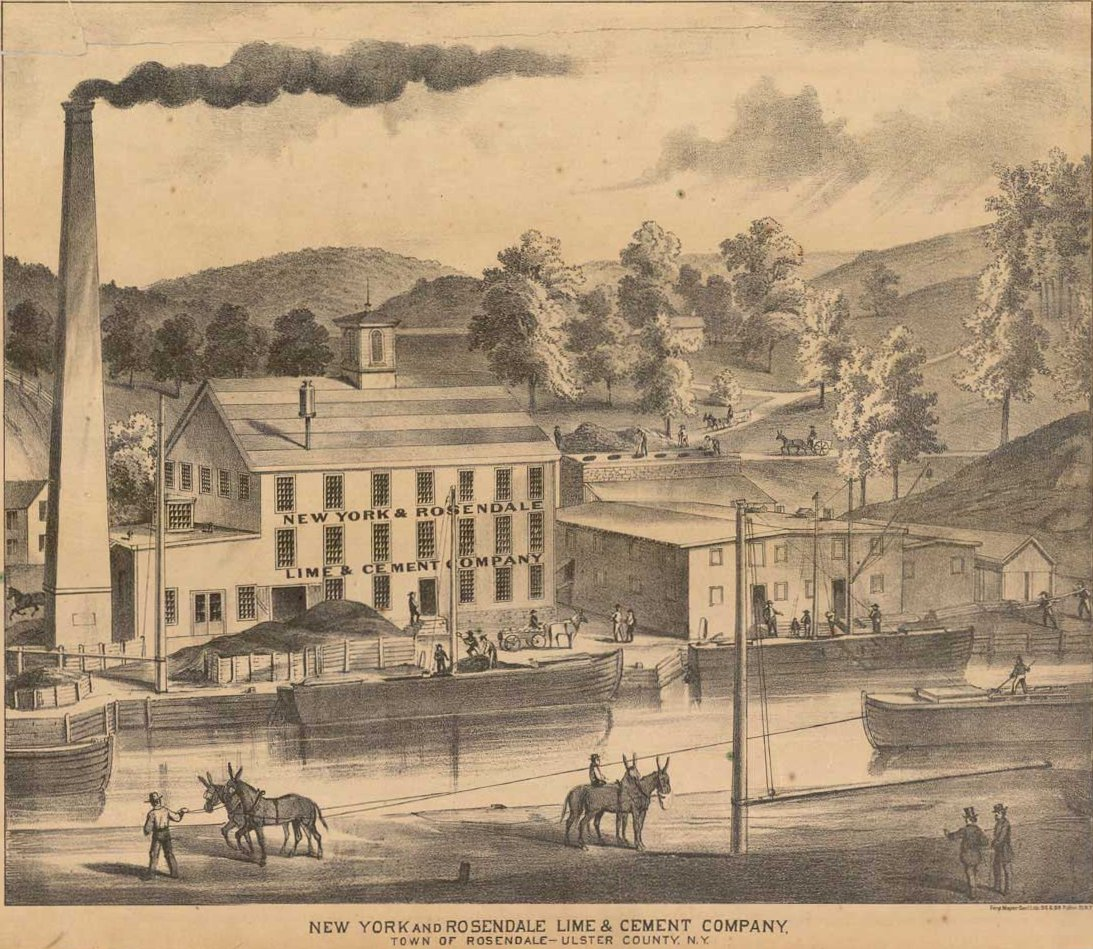
A lithograph depicting the New York and Rosendale Cement Company

The 1825 dolomite deposit was the "single largest natural cement deposit in the United States", encompassing 32 square miles (83 km^{2}) between High Falls and Kingston. The cement was used in the construction of the Delaware & Hudson canal and quickly became the "primary impetus for the town to grow and prosper".

By 1835 the village contained a hydraulic cement plant, a post office, tavern, and several stores and houses. When the surrounding town of Rosendale was created from parts of Hurley, New Paltz and Marbletown on April 26, 1844, the village was referred to by the same name as the town. On December 7, 1847, New York passed a law which allowed the municipal incorporation of villages within the state. The Wallkill Valley Railroad was opened to Rosendale in 1871, with the Rosendale trestle across the Rondout Creek completed the following year. James S. McEntee, a former Delaware and Hudson engineer, was the only person to have seen the opening of both the canal and the trestle. The Rosendale station, built by J. C. Shaffer of New Paltz in 1871, was the largest depot on the Wallkill Valley rail line. Unlike the other stations on the line, it was designed to have an "L" shape, rather than being rectangular, because the building was "squeezed by the severe slope behind it". In 1888, a pinkeye outbreak killed off many horses in Rosendale and along the canal.

Rosendale was sung about in a canal-related folk song in the 1880s called "Sari Jane". The village's cement mines were mentioned in a poem by D. Taylor, "Carrying Coal On The D & H Canal", and another poem, "Trip Down The Canal", by DeWitt E. Clinton and his wife. An 1840 painting by James Smilie depicting Rosendale was one of the earliest paintings to feature the canal.

The village was formally incorporated in 1890. Rosendale cement was used in the construction of several national monuments, such as the Brooklyn Bridge, the Washington Monument, Grand Central Terminal, and parts of the Statue of Liberty and the United States Capitol. At its peak Rosendale had fourteen bars on the same 1/4-mile (0.40 km) street, while the local cement industry employed 5,000 people and was producing four million barrels of cement each year.

=== Decline and disasters ===
A fire destroyed half the village in 1895, burning 26 buildings and causing more than $125,000 in damage. The village had no form of fire protection, though there had been an attempt prior to the fire to establish such a utility. Ironically, "those who were the heaviest losers by the fire were the ones who worked hardest to defeat the movement". About 10,000 people came to Rosendale following the fire to look at the charred remains, packing the village in "a scene [reminiscent of] an old-time country fair". In 1900, the village attempted to purchase a water plant for $40,000. The New York & Rosendale Cement Company sued to prevent bonding for the purchase. Before the case could reach the New York Supreme Court, Appellate Division, the village elected a new board of trustees, which attempted to block the purchase. They were unsuccessful and the village was forced to complete the purchase in 1903. The village enacted an ordinance in December 1901 to remove snow, ice and dirt from local gutters and sidewalks. Power lines were built throughout the village in 1906.

A "strawberry and ice cream festival" was held at Rosendale's Episcopal church on June 12, 1906. Around this time the village had an annual firemen's parades, which included athletic events, such as baseball and tug of war, as well as brass bands, dances, and speeches. Several different fire companies from throughout the region were involved in the parades.

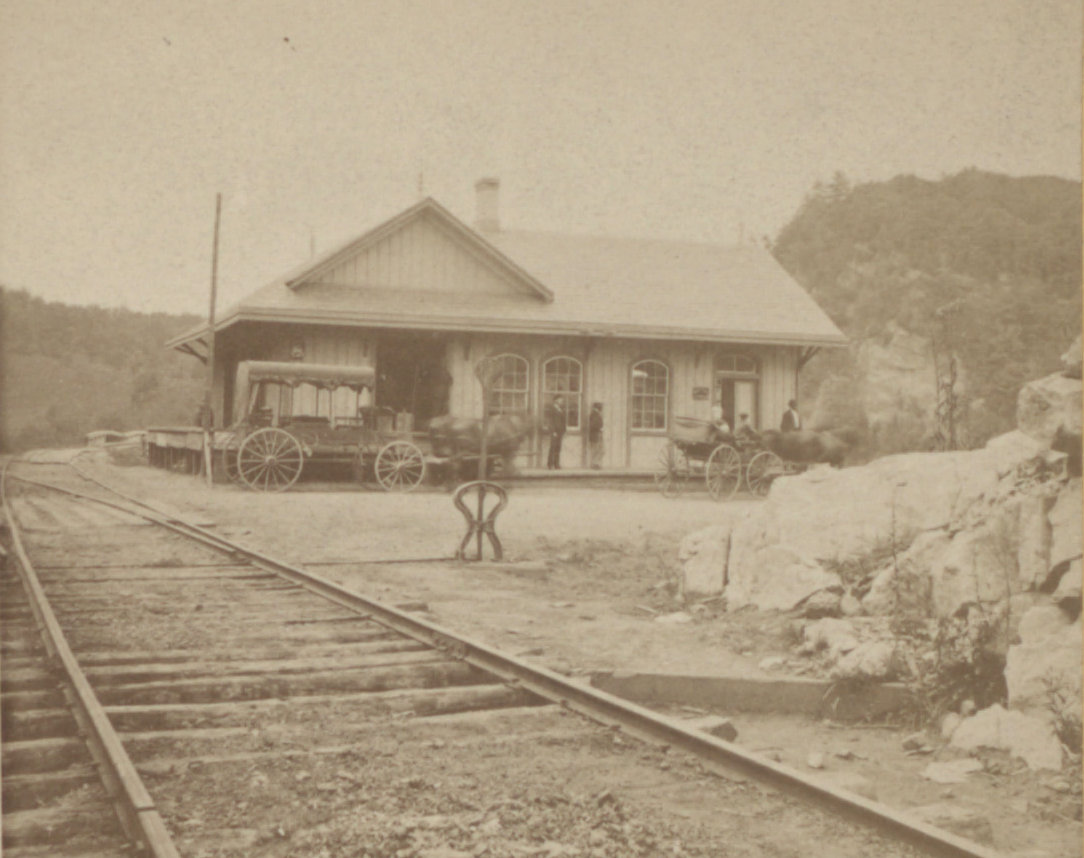
The Rosendale rail depot, once the largest on the Wallkill Valley line, was destroyed in a 1923 fire

By 1910, the canal running through Rosendale had closed. On July 5, 1911, the Jacob Rutsen house was hit by lightning and destroyed in a severe storm. The increased industrial use of Portland cement in the late 19th and early 20th centuries was detrimental to Rosendale's economy, and the village lost almost 70 percent of its population between 1900 and 1920; only one cement factory remained open after 1920. In April 1923, the Rosendale railroad depot and its freight house were destroyed in a fire.

The village suffered a severe flood in August 1928. Several feet of floodwater reached the first floors of buildings on Main Street, and the Kingston Fire Department sent boats to rescue stranded residents. In many houses, "muddy and slimy" water had filled the cellar "to the top step of the cellar stairway". Driveways had been washed out and planking was put down so that pumps could remove the water. Other major floods occurred in March 1936, August 1955, and October 1955. The water was as high as 8 feet (2.4 m) above the level of the street during the 1955 floods. In October 1956, a dinner reception was held to honor the government leaders and flood control officers who had coordinated rescue efforts during the previous year's floods.

The village petitioned the state for a census recount in 1957 in an attempt to secure additional state aid. The recount was performed in March 1957 and showed that the village's population had increased 16 percent since the 1950 census. The village received additional state aid. In December 1963 the federal government approved a $100,000 appropriation for flood control projects along the Rondout Creek in the town of Rosendale; the plan included changes to the shape of the creek itself and "raising a section of [the village's] Main Street to the level of Route 32".

On a clear, sunny day in July 1964, a group of six boys went swimming in the Rondout Creek at a park in Rosendale Village. After getting out of the creek, the boys were struck by lightning. One boy was knocked back into the creek, and regained consciousness as he was being pulled out. Two of the boys, Gary Schmitt and Ronald Morelli, died. Ronald Morelli was the son of Albert Morelli, who served as Rosendale's fire chief. Albert Morelli was part of the team that put out the fire at Reid's Village Inn.

Rosendale had lost its bowling alley to a 1967 fire, and, on January 14, 1969, a local hotel burned down. The hotel, Reid's Village Inn, was owned by village mayor Joseph Reid. Reid and his wife lived in the building, and lost all their possessions in the fire. Total damage was estimated to be between $50,000 and $75,000. Within two days of the blaze, the village purchased a fire truck and scheduled hearings for alternate-side parking and water meter proposals. By this time, the Army Corps of Engineers had built a 325-foot (99 m) flood wall, relocated several buildings, dredged the bottom of the creek, and raised a 1,000-foot (300 m) portion of Main Street about 3 feet (0.91 m). The project caused the 12-acre (4.9 ha) island in the creek to become a peninsula, connected to the northern bank. Since the completion of these projects, the village has not suffered floods as extreme as those of 1955.

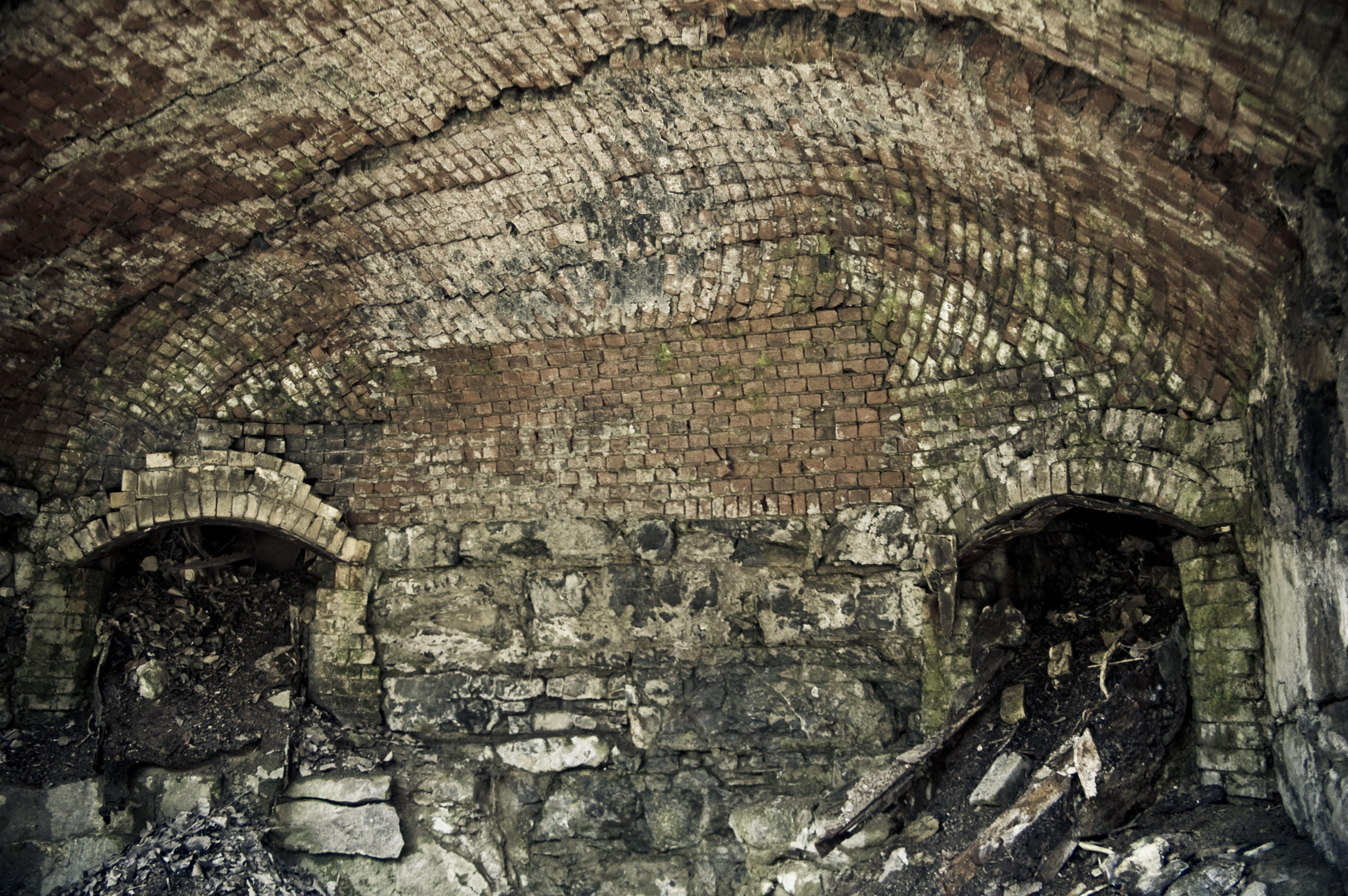
Defunct Rosendale cement kilns; the last cement plant in the town closed in 1971

In 1970, Rosendale's mayor ran off after declaring that the village "had gone broke". The commercial center of the village was shifting from Main Street (concurrent with Route 213) to Route 32; businesses on Route 32 included a department store, butcher shop, nail salon, barbershop, and restaurants. The village itself served as the commercial center of the town. The growth of shopping malls in nearby Kingston put many local stores out of business, and the last cement plant in Rosendale closed in 1971; abandoned cement mines were eventually used by edible mushroom growers who produced their crops "on beds of horse manure". Large piles of the manure were visible along Binnewater Road. The caves were also used to acquire naturally filtered water, maintain corn at a consistently cool temperature, and house a records storage facility.

The 40-acre (16 ha) storage facility, operated by Iron Mountain Incorporated, consists of street lights amid two-story buildings, all "erected beneath the old limestone caves leased from" the Snyder Estate for 99 years. It was opened for a public viewing in 1976 to quell rumors that the "heavily guarded" facility, described as a "subterranean James Bond set", was part of a cave network that connected the village to Kingston, and that the facility was actually a fallout shelter for federal officials; the facility is capable of withstanding a "direct atomic hit on [nearby] Poughkeepsie". Sealed behind a 7 1/2-short-ton (6.8 t) steel door, the facility contains "its own well and ... sewage system", and enough generators to remain self-sufficient for three months.

=== Rise of hippie movement ===
"Friendship is measured among these hippie types by passed swigs of wine: the communion of the hip."
—Chris Farlekas, 1976

The man who suggested that the underground facility have a public exhibition was a local personality, Billy Guldy. Guldy was born around 1940 in Kingston, and, by the 1970s, had become a leading figure in Rosendale Village's hippie movement. He declared himself a king, and frequently dressed as one. He owned a bar called "The Well", and a hotel in the village, and his portrait was painted on the door of a local bar. He declared Halloween a national holiday, ran for president, and led 200 people in a parade down Main Street. At one point Guldy took a bus to Yankee Stadium to give baseball player Fred Stanley the "key to Rosendale". Some older residents considered Guldy crazy, and former village trustee Harold Schoonmaker felt "there's something wrong with a man that walks around the streets barefoot, wearing a robe and derby". The village's children viewed Guldy favorably and were quite friendly with him.

Some of the village's more traditional residents felt overwhelmed by the influx of beatniks, and locals were conflicted over whether Rosendale's transformation into an art colony would benefit the village in the long term. A major clash between the hippies and village police occurred at a bar on June 21, 1975, causing over 150 people to show up to see what was going on. Although "there were many people actively involved" in the riot, only Guldy was charged.

A group that opposed the hippie movement managed to keep Guldy off the mayoral ballot in 1975. He became a write-in candidate for village trustee, with his friend, poet George Montgomery, running for mayor. Montgomery lost the election to Raivo Puusemp, a sculptor from SoHo. After his election, Puusemp chided Guldy for being a poor role model for the village youth. Puusemp was not a native of Rosendale and had not lived there long. By early July 1975, Puusemp had appointed a village dog warden after a dog bit a child and was allowed to run about the streets unrestrained.

=== Disincorporation ===
"This village is not a heritage ... it is a luxury we can no longer afford."
—Mayor Raivo Puusemp, 1976
"In Rosendale, A Public Work, the attempt was made to superimpose a formal concept upon an essentially directionless political microsystem and to affect that system permanently by doing so..."
—Raivo Puusemp, 1980

"The genre was the village and its survival problems. The frame was concentrated in a geographical place ... The public, more properly the participants, were the townspeople, Mayor Puusemp, county officials, lawyers, representatives of the federal government, and the publishers and readers of area newspapers. The purpose, like that I have suggested for such art, was therapeutic: to cure a local illness and allow village life ... to go on more constructively."
—Allan Kaprow, 2003

When Raivo Puusemp, a conceptual artist and art instructor at SUNY Ulster, became mayor of Rosendale, the village was plagued by an "overbearing tax structure and problems with its municipal utilities". Though disincorporation was already known as a possible solution to the village's crises, it had been an "emotionally charged issue" and no action had been taken. By this time Rosendale "could [no longer] govern itself". The village and town governments had often been at odds; the town was governed by Republicans, while the village was increasingly under Democratic control. This friction manifested in several ways. Town and village officials would frequently disrupt each other's meetings, and the town ordered its snow plows to raise their blades while passing through the village; the village subsequently bought its own plow and banned the town's plow from entering village limits.

During his campaign, Puusemp did not mention disincorporation or how it related to art, though he had already decided two months before the election that the only solution to the village's problems was disincorporation. Beginning in 1969, Puusemp "developed an interest in group dynamics and social and political processes". In some of his early artworks (termed "influence pieces"), Puusemp would manipulate subjects into unknowingly executing his ideas while believing that they, the subjects, had come up with said ideas on their own. He entered politics to combine "influence and concept ... compatibly".

Viewing the "project [as] an artwork in the form of a political problem", Puusemp convinced the people of Rosendale to disincorporate by publicly comparing the village's finances to what would be "need[ed] to maintain a viable town". The village's board of trustees strongly favored dissolution and "forced three separate votes before [reaching] a 179 to 87 majority to abolish the village". A public referendum on the dissolution was held on March 16, 1976, which passed in a 2–1 landslide. Puusemp resigned as mayor on October 1, and moved to Utah with his family. He vowed never to run for office again. During his tenure in office, and in the aftermath of his resignation, Puusemp received widespread popular support.

Marc Phelan, a village trustee and associate of Puusemp, became mayor following Puusemp's departure. He was reelected the following March with 141 votes, beating three other candidates to become the village's last mayor. Rosendale became unincorporated on January 1, 1977, though the village government did not disband until the end of 1977; the village completely ceased to exist "at the stroke of midnight on Dec. 31, 1977". Ironically, the state and federal government provided funding for new sewage and water systems following the disincorporation, mitigating the primary reasons residents had voted to dissolve.

Puusemp documented the dissolution by collecting "press clippings, council meeting minutes, and public documents" and publishing them after his friend, performance artist Paul McCarthy, urged him to do so. Both the book and the dissolution of Rosendale Village itself can be considered different facets of the same artistic work. The 1980 census listed Rosendale Village as a census-designated place (CDP). The former village is also considered a hamlet, an unofficial term which refers to a named but unincorporated place in New York. Rosendale Village is the largest voting bloc in the town of Rosendale, and of all former villages in the Hudson Valley, Rosendale was the last to dissolve.

=== Modern Rosendale ===
After the village's disincorporation, taxes decreased for former village residents, but increased for Rosendale residents throughout the rest of the town. The population of the former village has grown 24.5 percent, from 1,220 to an estimated 1,519 people. The same year that the village chose to disincorporate, the Wallkill Valley rail line that ran through the village also ceased regular service.

The revitalization of businesses in the former village was credited to the influx of artists. Prior to the 1980s, store owners in Rosendale Village had either retired or died, and their shops had become residential or simply abandoned. Newcomers purchased these properties, restored them, and returned them to commercial service.

On September 13, 1991, the Century House Historical Society was formed to preserve and educate on the history of the Rosendale cement industry. The New York State Education Department granted a permanent charter to the organization on June 13, 2000. The Society maintains a museum and holds frequent events on the history and geology of the area. The Society held a concert in one of the former cement mines, the Widow Jane Mine, around 1996; the concert caused severe traffic and presented a fire hazard, and the society was subsequently sued by the town which was subsequently dismissed. The Widow Jane Mine has been the site of poetry readings, Taiko drumming, "all-night raves, Halloween horror shows and role-playing vampire games". It is also one of the few mines in Rosendale that is almost completely horizontal, and is part of the Snyder Estate Natural Cement Historic District.

Rosendale hosts several annual festivals. The Rosendale Street Festival, held in the end of July on Main Street, showcases local talent and celebrates the birthday of Rosendale icon, Uncle Willy. Rosendale has held an annual pickle festival since 1998. Some view the pickle festival as a form of social expression, and the "current artisan pickling scene" has been compared to the mentality of early microbreweries. The pickle festival was originally started by Eri Yamaguchi and Bill Brooks, as a way to introduce Ulster County to pickled Japanese food, such as oshinko. The festival has featured Japanese traditional dancing. At the first pickle festival the number of people attending was 1,000, a number five times greater than expected. The following year it was double that, and by 2003, attendance was almost 5,000. Rosendale also holds a recurring winter festival known as "Frozendale", and in late September 2010, the hamlet had a zombie-themed festival. Rosendale has also held two Mermaid Parades in recent years the first in 2015 and the second in 2016. Historically, Rosendale's festivals have "draw[n as many as] 30,000 people".

== Geography and geology ==
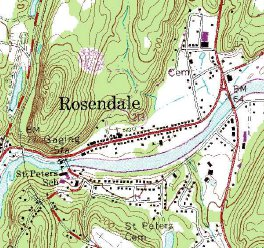
A 1980 topographic map of Rosendale Village

Rosendale Village has a total area of 1.959 square miles (5.07 km^{2}), of which 1.904 square miles (4.93 km^{2}) is land and 0.055 square miles (0.14 km^{2}) is water. The former village is located at the center of the town of Rosendale, and is "situated on the [former Delaware and Hudson] canal and Rondout Creek", about 2 3/4 miles (4.4 km) north of the creek's confluence with the Wallkill River. The highest recorded crest of the Rondout Creek in Rosendale was 26.5 feet (8.1 m) on October 16, 1955. The creek does not normally rise above 10 feet (3.0 m), but overflows its banks after reaching 18 feet (5.5 m). The hamlet's ZIP code is 12472 and it is in area code 845. Rosendale Village is bordered by the creek and by the 495-foot (151 m) Joppenbergh Mountain. It is traversed by state routes NY 32 and NY 213. The former village is 2 miles (3.2 km) east of the hamlet of High Falls, 6 miles (9.7 km) north of the village of New Paltz, and 8 miles (13 km) south of the city of Kingston.

Rosendale is underlain by a shale member of the Martinburg Formation called Martinburg shale, deposited as early as 500 million years ago; Martinburg shale also lines the bottom of the Rondout Creek as it flows through the town. A conglomerate of the Shawangunk Formation was deposited over the Martinburg layer approximately 425 million years ago. The conglomerate is in turn covered by High Falls Shale, a reddish shale formed by mud flats. Subsequent streams left a layer of gray Binnewater Sandstone above the shale. After the sandstone was deposited, the region experienced folding and faulting, and was submerged in a shallow sea. This allowed the creation of fossiliferous limestone roughly 390 million years ago, specifically the Rondout Formation and New Scotland Formation. The Rondout Formation's dolomite member, formed during the upper Silurian, was mined throughout the village because of its ability to form natural cement. The region experienced repeated glaciation, and large amounts of till and alluvium were deposited during the Wisconsonian glaciation.

== Climate ==
There is more precipitation during May than in any other month; Rosendale currently has an annual precipitation of about 44 inches (110 cm). Between 1931 and 1955, the town averaged 48 inches (120 cm) each year. July is the hottest month, on average; the hottest recorded temperature occurred during July 1995. January is the coldest month, and the lowest recorded temperature was taken in January 1961.

Climate data for Rosendale, New York
Month	Jan	Feb	Mar	Apr	May	Jun	Jul	Aug	Sep	Oct	Nov	Dec	Year
Record high °F (°C)	68 (20)	73 (23)	86 (30)	94 (34)	96 (36)	99 (37)	103 (39)	100 (38)	101 (38)	88 (31)	82 (28)	72 (22)	103 (39)
Mean daily maximum °F (°C)	34 (1)	38 (3)	47 (8)	59 (15)	70 (21)	78 (26)	84 (29)	82 (28)	74 (23)	62 (17)	51 (11)	39 (4)	60 (16)
Mean daily minimum °F (°C)	15 (−9)	16 (−9)	26 (−3)	36 (2)	46 (8)	55 (13)	60 (16)	59 (15)	50 (10)	38 (3)	30 (−1)	21 (−6)	38 (3)
Record low °F (°C)	−30 (−34)	−23 (−31)	−13 (−25)	13 (−11)	27 (−3)	35 (2)	43 (6)	38 (3)	26 (−3)	18 (−8)	3 (−16)	−23 (−31)	−30 (−34)
Average precipitation inches (mm)	3.19 (81)	2.53 (64)	3.59 (91)	3.79 (96)	4.73 (120)	3.73 (95)	4.72 (120)	3.83 (97)	3.69 (94)	3.56 (90)	3.53 (90)	3.23 (82)	44.12 (1,120)
Source: The Weather Channel

== Landmarks ==
=== Churches ===
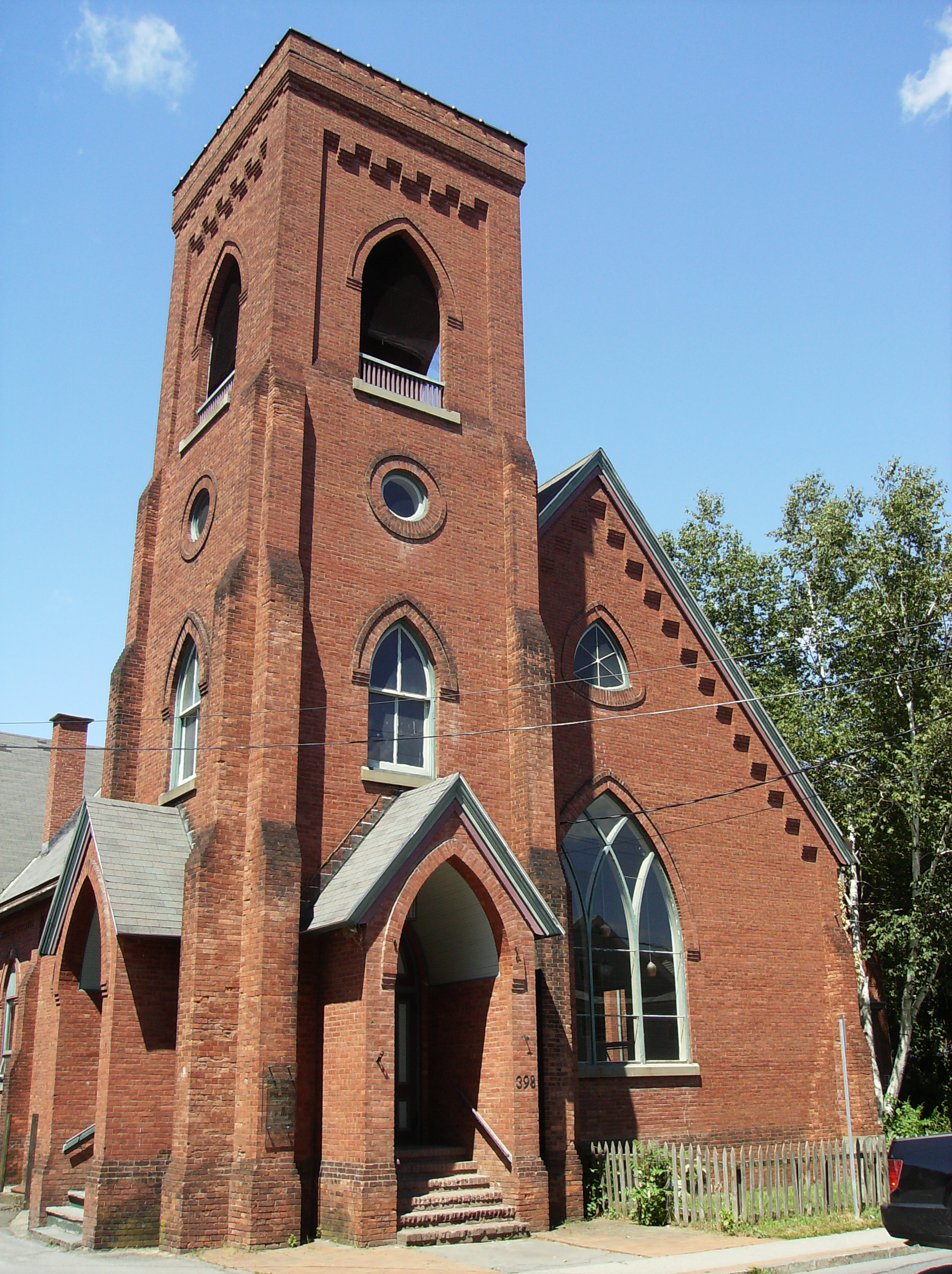
The former Dutch Reformed church, now a glass studio

Rosendale Village has had four churches throughout its existence: a Baptist, Dutch Reformed, Catholic and Episcopal church. Of these churches, only the Catholic one still functions as a church.

The first Baptist minister arrived in Rosendale in March 1839, and the first baptisms took place on April 5, 1840. The First Associate Baptist Society in the Village of Rosendale was incorporated on May 22, 1840. A meeting house for the society was built in 1842; it was dedicated on October 17 and its pews were purchased on November 4. The church underwent a revival between 1875 and 1876, and was reincorporated on May 1, 1876, as the Baptist Church of Rosendale. It was closed as a church in 1929, and sold in 1972 to a local filmmaker, Walter Helmuth, who used it as a house. At some point it housed a "fraternal organization of farmers" and was known as the "Grange". In the 1990s it was used as a theater. On January 15, 2004, the building burned down. Though the town's fire station was directly across the street, the extreme cold hindered firefighters' efforts to control the fire.

The Protestant Reformed Dutch Church of Rosendale was incorporated on November 28, 1843. The church originally cost $2,500 to build, and was designed to seat 300 people. It burned down and was rebuilt in 1895. In 1985, it was renovated and converted into a glass studio called Belltower Lighting.

Catholic priests had come to Rosendale as early as 1840, and the first mass in the village was held in a cooper's shop. The original Church of St. Peter was completed in the summer of 1850, and the first mass in that building was held on August 15. The church was not officially incorporated until April 29, 1865. A newer, larger building was constructed in 1876, on the same road as the village's rail depot. The new building followed an English Gothic architecture style. It was made of bricks, created near the North River, and was ornamented with yellow bricks from Perth Amboy, New Jersey, and sandstone from Amherst, New York. The first mass in the new church occurred on December 25, 1876; the building's total construction cost was $31,000. The Church of St. Peter is the only one of the village's churches that still functions as a church.

Rosendale's Episcopal church, the All Saints' Chapel, was built in 1876. It was hit hard by the floods of 1955, to the point where "the rising water floated the organ up toward the altar". It was abandoned after the flooding, and was purchased by a local cement magnate, so that it could be converted into the Rosendale Library; the library association had its charter granted on October 24, 1958. The building was severely damaged by a fire on January 15, 1975, but was restored, and a new wing was added; the wing was named after Anna Mae Auchmoedy, the building's first librarian. In 1986, the library was listed on the National Register of Historic Places.

=== Joppenbergh Mountain ===
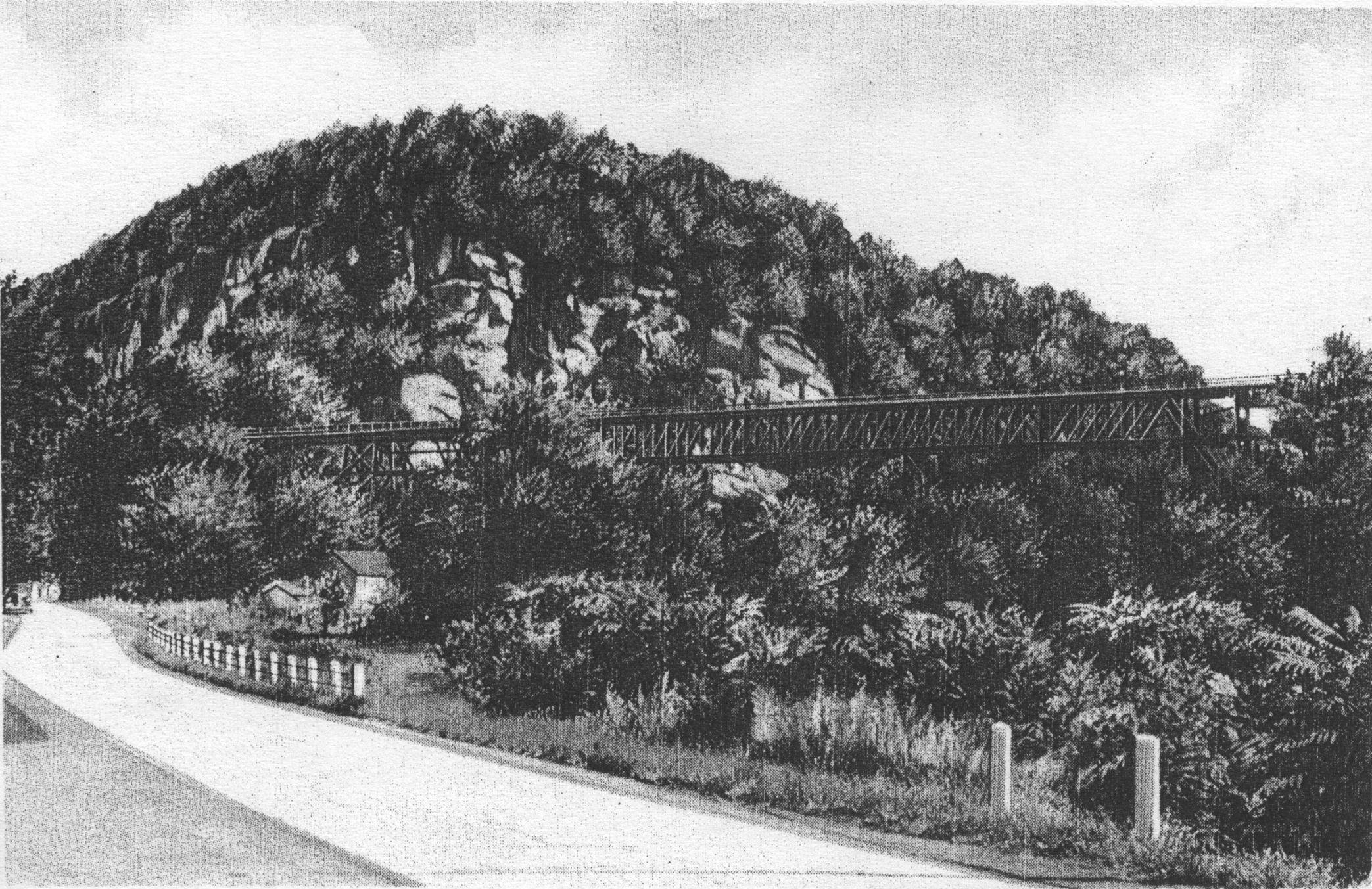
Joppenbergh Mountain, depicted next to the hamlet's railroad trestle

Joppenbergh is a 495-foot (151 m) mountain, adjacent to the hamlet's railroad trestle and Route 213. It was named after Rosendale's founder, Jacob Rutsen, and mined throughout the late 19th century for the dolomite that was used in the manufacture of natural cement. There was a large cave-in on December 19, 1899, that destroyed mining equipment and collapsed shafts within the mountain. Though it was feared that several workers had been killed, the collapse happened during lunch, and all the miners were outside, eating. Since the collapse the mountain has experienced shaking and periodic rockfalls.

During the late 1930s, Joppenbergh became the site of several skiing competitions, which continued until the early 1940s. The slope was designed by Harold Schelderup for Rosendale's first competition in 1937; Schelderup participated in a competition that July after the slope was coated with borax. Skiing stopped until the 1960s, when a new slope was built, and competitions were held until 1971.

The town of Rosendale considered buying land near the mountain in 2003 for parking. The following year, the town leased a tract of land to build a municipal parking lot. Joppenbergh was put up for sale in 2009, and, in March 2011, the Open Space Institute offered to purchase the entire 117-acre (47 ha) property and sell it to the town; the following month, Rosendale's town board agreed to the deal.

=== Railroad bridge ===
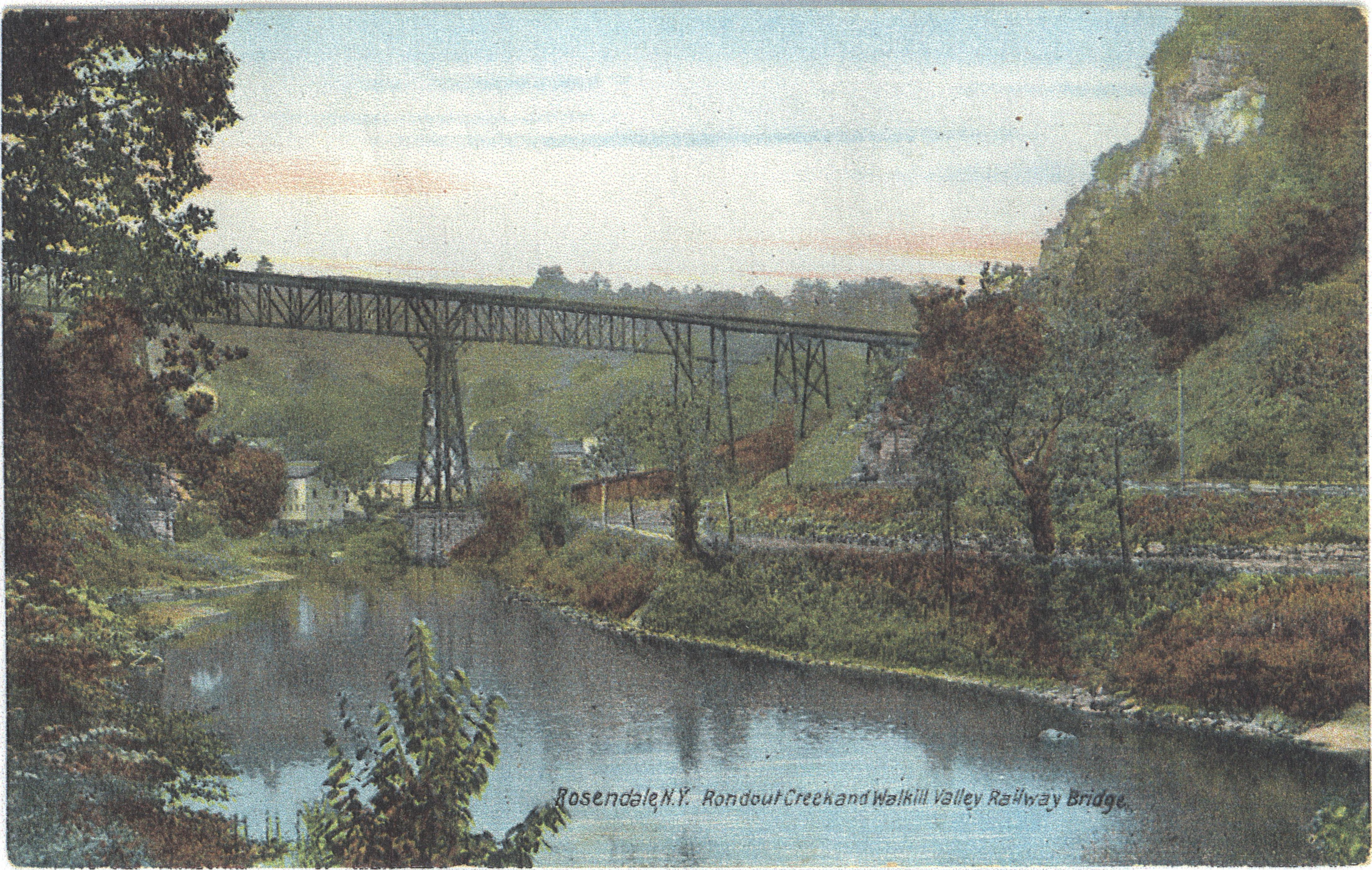
The Rosendale trestle, spanning Rondout Creek in the village

In 1869 the town of Rosendale issued municipal bonds to pay for its portion of the Wallkill Valley Railroad, and construction of a railroad bridge spanning the Rondout Creek began the following year. After bridging the Wallkill River in New Paltz, the railroad reached Rosendale in 1871. The Rosendale trestle was formally opened during a large ceremony on April 6, 1872. The height of the bridge terrified onlookers, who questioned the trestle's sturdiness. The bridge's completion allowed the rail line to continue north to Kingston.

The bridge was rebuilt between 1895 and 1896 to convert it from iron to steel. It was repeatedly reinforced throughout its existence. When Conrail closed the Wallkill Valley line in 1977, the stability of the trestle had been one of its primary reasons for doing so. Conrail had tried to sell the bridge as early as 1983, and in 1986 the trestle was sold to a private businessman, John Rahl, for one dollar.

Rahl installed decking on half of the trestle between 1989 and 1991, attempting to open it as a bungee jumping platform. A court ruling found that such a venture violated zoning laws, and the town denied Rahl a variance. In 2009 the county seized the trestle, and it was sold to an environmental group. The trestle was closed in 2010 for repairs, and was opened in 2013 as part of the Wallkill Valley Rail Trail.

=== Route 32 bridge ===
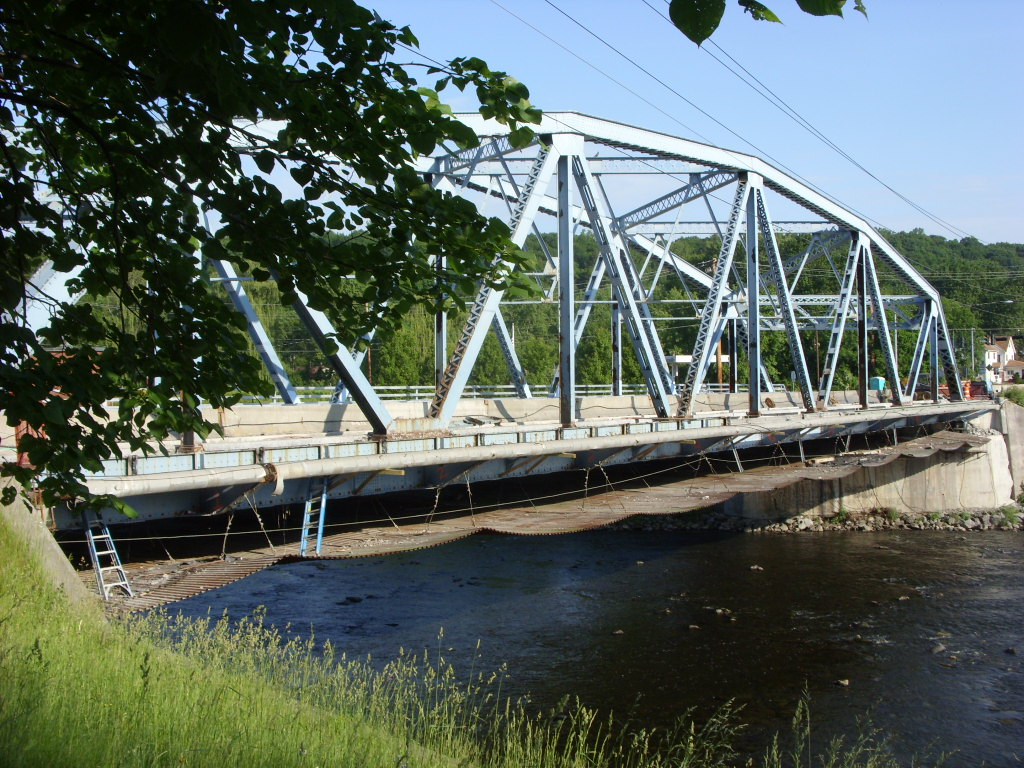
The Route 32 bridge, during its 2009 rehabilitation

During the American Revolution, General George Clinton crossed the Rondout Creek at Rosendale Village in October 1777, arriving "one or two days too late to resist the British attack" on Kingston by the forces of General John Vaughan. Clinton's fording spot is now the location of a bridge on State Route 32. The bridge, originally built around 1934, was refurbished in 1970, and again between 2008 and 2009. While the bridge was being renovated in 2009, only one lane had been open, congesting traffic. The total cost of the project was $5.5 million. There is a 58-spot park and ride on Route 32, by Rosendale's community center, that is served by the Ulster County Area Transit and Trailways bus services.

=== Theater ===
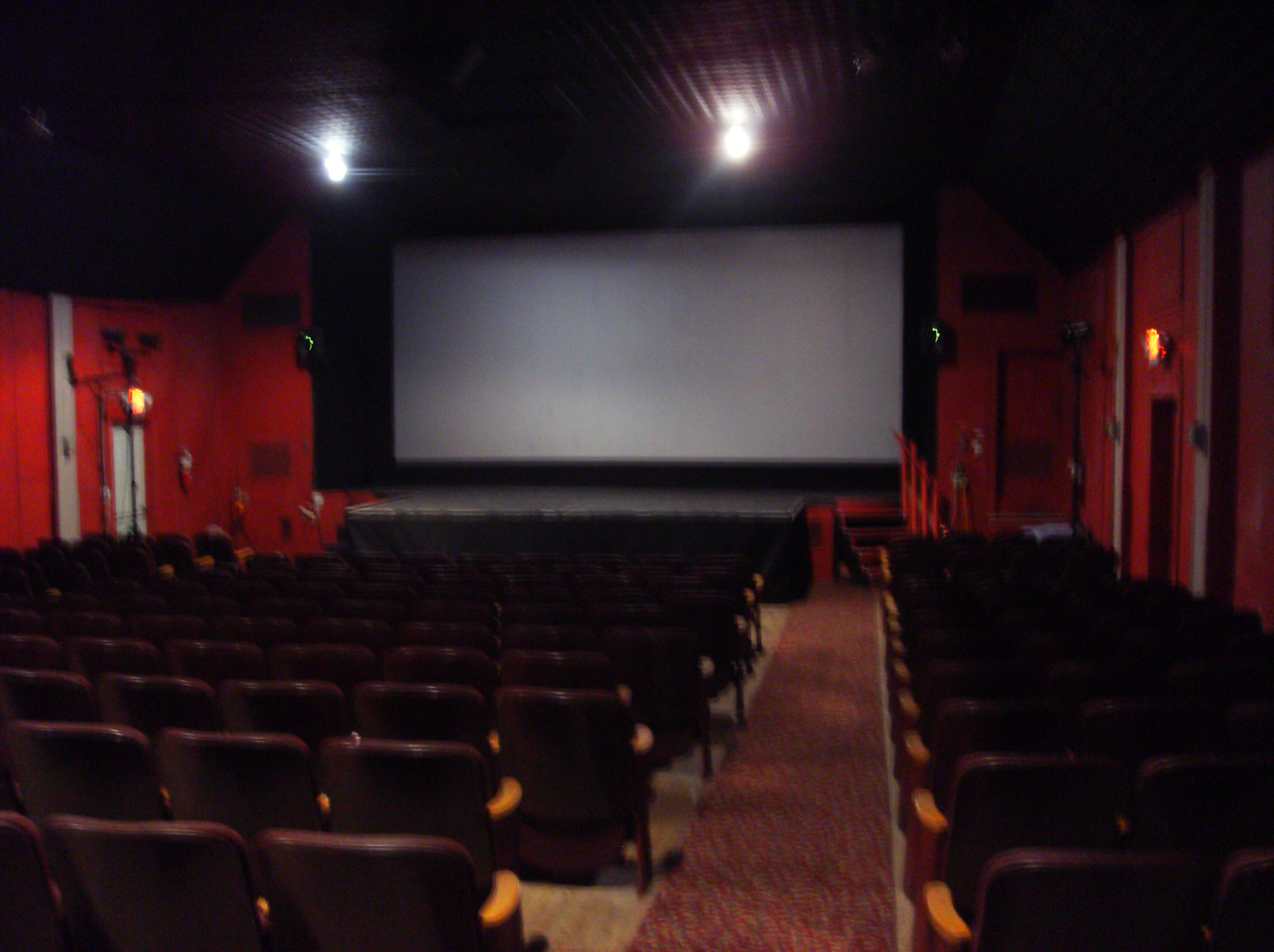
Originally a casino, the Rosendale Theatre was converted into a movie theater in the 1940s

Originally a casino in the 1920s, the Rosendale Theater was seized by the village and converted into a theater in 1949 by Anthony Cacchio, a man who bore a strong resemblance to filmmaker Otto Preminger. The first film shown on opening night in February 1949 was Blood on the Moon. Caccio owned the building outright by 1954, and operated it with his son, Anthony Cacchio Jr., who banned popcorn in the theater in 1969. The theater served as the village's fire department at one point.

In early 2010, a real estate developer approached the Cacchios with an offer to purchase the theater. A 501(c) nonprofit organization was formed in March 2010 to preserve the building, which secured a $50,000 grant from PepsiCo to help take out a $385,000 mortgage. Since completing its purchase of the theater on August 19, 2010, the Rosendale Theatre Collective has added a digital projector, surround sound system, stage thrust, and retractable screen. The group plans to add a concession stand and move the ticket booth outside during warm months. In late February 2011, the theater received a $175,000 state grant to renovate the building.

== Demographics ==
Historical population
Census	Pop.	Note	%±
1890	1,706		—
1900	1,840		7.9%
1910	1,125		−38.9%
1920	555		−50.7%
1930	539		−2.9%
1940	671		24.5%
1950	885		31.9%
1960	1,033		16.7%
1970	1,220		18.1%
1980	1,134		−7.0%
1990	1,284		13.2%
2000	1,374		7.0%
2010	1,349		−1.8%
2020	1,285		−4.7%
Sources: 1890, 1900–1920, 1930–1950, 1960–1970, 1980, 1990, 2000, 2010

As of the census of 2000, there were 1,374 people, 602 households, and 329 families residing in the CDP. The population density was 725.5 inhabitants per square mile (280.1/km^{2}). There were 666 housing units at an average density of 351.7 per square mile (135.8/km^{2}). The racial makeup of the CDP was 94.9% White, 2.3% African American, 0.5% Asian, 1.2% from other races, and 1.1% from two or more races. Hispanic or Latino of any race were 4.00% of the population.

There were 602 households, out of which 25.4% had children under the age of 18 living with them, 40.7% were married couples living together, 9.0% had a female householder with no husband present, and 45.2% were non-families. 34.7% of all households were made up of individuals, and 12.6% had someone living alone who was 65 years of age or older. The average household size was 2.27 and the average family size was 2.97.

In the CDP, the population was spread out, with 21.0% under the age of 18, 8.2% from 18 to 24, 32.5% from 25 to 44, 25.8% from 45 to 64, and 12.4% who were 65 years of age or older. The median age was 39 years. For every 100 females, there were 93.2 males. For every 100 females age 18 and over, there were 90.7 males.

The median income for a household in the CDP was $34,712, and the median income for a family was $50,789. Males had a median income of $35,259 versus $25,764 for females. The per capita income for the CDP was $20,700. About 5.2% of families and 8.2% of the population were below the poverty line, including 8.6% of those under age 18 and 3.6% of those age 65 or over.

== Education ==
The school district for most of the CDP is Rondout Valley Central School District. A portion is in Kingston City School District. The comprehensive high school of the Kingston City district is Kingston High School.

The Roman Catholic Archdiocese of New York operates Catholic schools in Ulster County. St. Peters School in Rosendale closed in 2001.

== See also ==
- List of census-designated places in New York

== Bibliography ==
- Benjamin, Gerald; Nathan, Richard P. (2001). Regionalism and Realism: Study of Government in the New York Metropolitan Area. Washington, DC: Brookings Institution Press. ISBN 0-8157-0087-3.
- Fried, Marc B. (2005). Shawangunk Place Names: Indian, Dutch, and English Geographical Names of the Shawangunk Mountain Region: Their Origin, Interpretation, and Historical Evolution. Gardiner, NY: Marc B. Fried. ISBN 0-9663351-2-0.
- Genero, Peter P. (2005). Thank Rosendale: New York - The Empire State. Fort Pierce, FL: Genero Inc. ISBN 0-9759419-1-7.
- Gilchrist, Ann (1976). Footsteps Across Cement: A History of the Township of Rosendale, New York. Lith Art. OCLC 2597851.
- Kaprow, Allan (2003). Essays on the Blurring of Art and Life: Expanded Edition (2nd ed.). Berkeley, CA: University of California Press. ISBN 0-520-24079-0.
- Mabee, Carleton (1995). Listen to the Whistle: An Anecdotal History of the Wallkill Valley Railroad. Fleishmanns, NY: Purple Mountain Press. ISBN 0-935796-69-X.
- Perls, Jeffrey (2003). Shawangunks Trail Companion: A Complete Guide to Hiking, Mountain Biking, Cross-Country Skiing, and More Only 90 Miles from New York City. Woodstock, VT: Countryman Press. ISBN 0-88150-563-3.
- Purves, Ted (2004). What We Want Is Free: Generosity And Exchange In Recent Art. Albany, NY: State University of New York Press. ISBN 0-7914-6289-7.
- Sanderson, Dorothy Hurlbut (1974). The Delaware & Hudson Canalway: Carrying Coals To Rondout (2nd ed.). Ellenville, NY: Rondout Valley Publishing Company. OCLC 922323.
- Sylvester, Nathaniel Bartlett (1880). History of Ulster County, New York, with Illustrations and Biographical Sketches of its Prominent Men and Pioneers: Part Second: History of the Towns of Ulster County. Philadelphia, PA: Everts & Peck. OCLC 2385957.
