= Widow Jane Mine =

Cement mine in New York state, 1825–1970

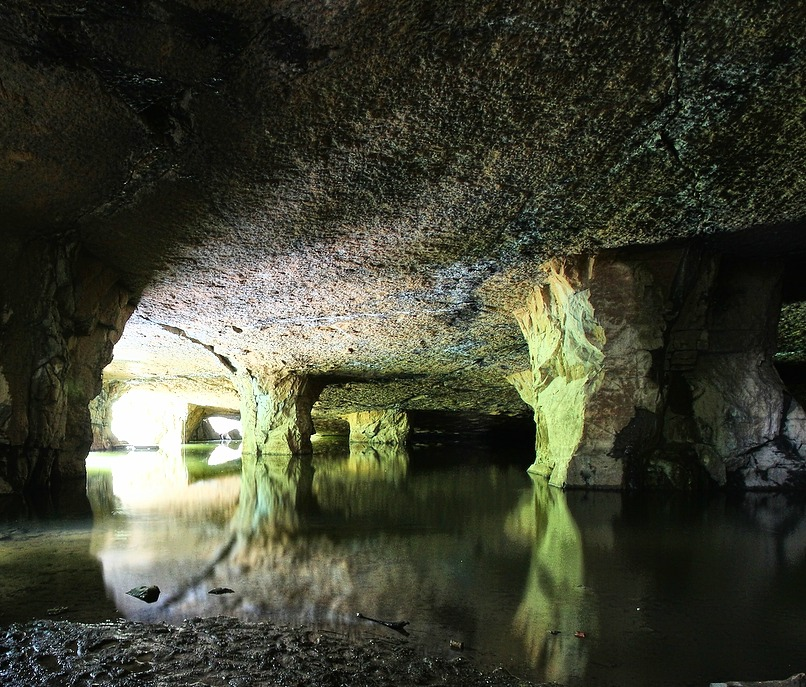
- interior of the mine
- Interactive map of Widow Jane Mine
- Location: Ulster County, New York, United States; 41.841611°N 74.098806°W
- Products: Dolomite
- Type: Room and pillar
- Opened: 1825
- Closed: 1970

Widow Jane Mine is a former cement mine located west of Rosendale, New York. The mine was active from 1825 to 1970 and is now part of the Snyder Estate Natural Cement Historic District. Dolomite extracted from the mine was used to make Rosendale cement which was widely used in the 19th century, contributing to the base of the Statue of Liberty among other structures.

Since the closure of Widow Jane Mine in 1970, the unique acoustics of its chambers have led to its use as a performance venue. The Century House Historical Society, which oversees the property, hosts a summer concert series in the mine. An annual Subterranean Poetry Festival is held there as well. It has been used as a recording studio, a venue for plays, and an art exhibition space. 80% of the mine is underwater.

== Origin of name ==
According to the Century House Historical Society, the widow Jane was likely Jane LeFevre Snyder (1820–1904), who lived at the Century House on the Snyder Estate. Considered a tragic, yet beloved figure within the community of Ulster County, she was 31 years old when her husband James Snyder died in 1852. Among her children were four boys, all of whom died in infancy.

== History of the mine ==
Engineers working on the Delaware and Hudson Canal found extensive outcrops of dolomite at Joppenbergh Mountain in 1825. The deposits contained an ideal amount of clay minerals that, once pulverized and mixed, could be turned into Rosendale cement, a natural cement without additives.

Widow Jane Mine was established in 1825 on property owned by the Snyder family. It is a drift mine, constructed using the room and pillar technique, where pillars of dolomite have been left to support the overlying rock. The mine is more or less horizontal with the mining following the limestone seams at nearly 90-degree angles.

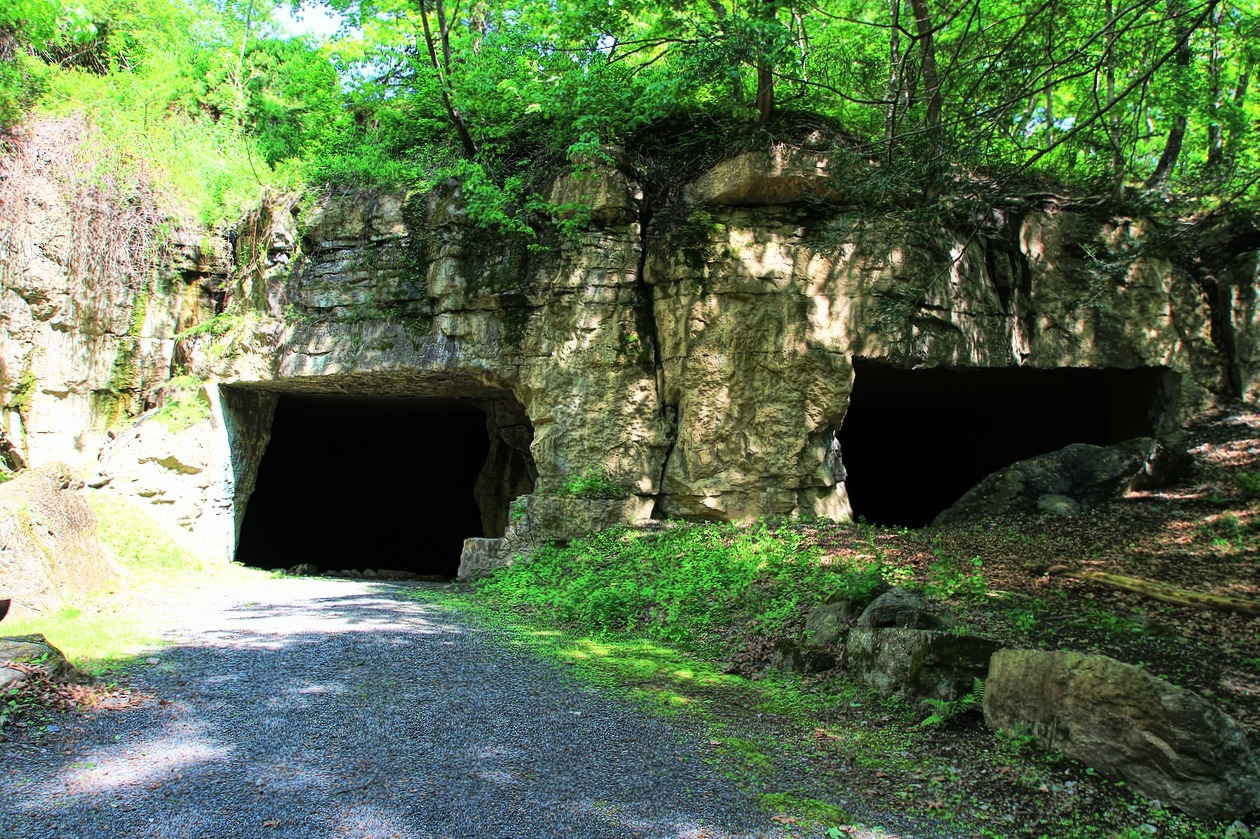
Entrance to the Widow Jane Mine

Entrances to the Widow Jane Mine were created to be large enough to accommodate wagons and horses and for the transportation of waste rock and dolomite. Workers used sledgehammers to drive star drills into the rock and carve out blasting holes for black powder.

During the 19th century, mining operations at the Widow Jane Mine involved child labor. Around 20% of the laborers were children, who were not given time for school, play or rest. Many of them were killed and maimed in mining accidents.

Rosendale's cement industry peaked at the end of the 19th century, producing nearly 8.5 million barrels a year. At the peak of its operations, the area's mines employed 5,000 workers and produced nearly half of the cement for North America. Its cement was used in the construction of the Washington Monument, the wings of the United States Capitol building and the Brooklyn Bridge. From 1884 to 1886, limestone from the Widow Jane Mine was transported to Liberty Island where it was used to construct the base of the Statue of Liberty.

The Widow Jane Mine closed in 1970. After the decline in demand for Rosendale cement, mines in the area were used to grow mushrooms for Campbell's Soup, for trout farming, and for storing corn.

== Venue ==
Widow Jane Mine has been likened to an underground pillared room, and hosts frequent events in the summer taking advantage of the unique acoustics. In addition to a summer concert series, the mine has served as a recording studio and a venue for plays. An annual Subterranean Poetry Festival has been held at Widow Jane Mine since 1989. The mine has a stage used for performances and electricity is provided by generators. An event called "Rave in the Cave", held at Widow Jane Mine in 1996, was attended by at least 3000 people and caused severe traffic issues and a fire. The city of Rosendale sued the Century House Historical Society and a judge limited the occupancy of the mine to 750 people.

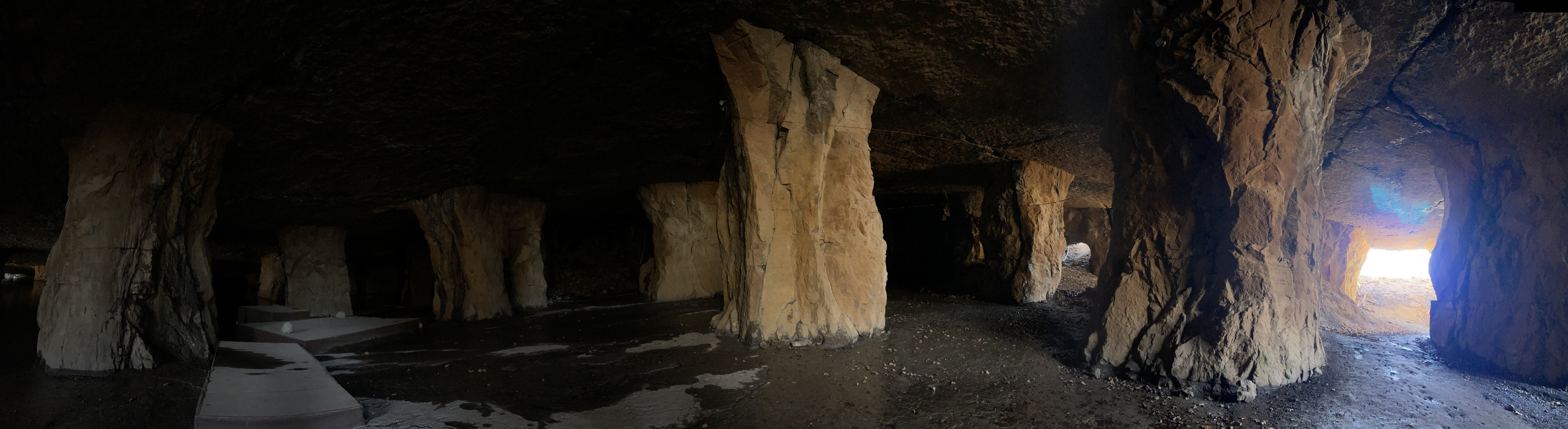
Interior of the mine showing pillars

The Widow Jane Mine has been the site of a fencing tournament, equinox rituals, shadow puppetry, art exhibitions, Taiko drumming, "Halloween horror shows and role-playing vampire games". The 1997 album From the Caves of the Iron Mountain by Tony Levin, Jerry Marotta and Steve Gorn was recorded in the mine. It includes cave sounds and was recorded by Tchad Blake using a binaural microphone setup. The making of the album was the subject of the documentary Tales from the Widow Jane Mine.

Limestone water from the area is used by the Brooklyn-based Widow Jane Distillery to proof their whiskeys. Though named for the Widow Jane mine, the mineral water is sourced from the Rosendale Mine, on the opposite side of the hill.

== Visiting the mine ==
Widow Jane Mine is located a half mile west of Rosendale on Route 213. It is part of the Snyder Estate Natural Cement Historic District, which includes remnants of cement operations including kilns. The Century House Historical Society oversees the mine as well as 19 acres and the 1809 structure where Jacob Lowe Snyder once lived. Widow Jane Mine is the oldest cement mine on the property and one of the few mines in Rosendale that is almost completely horizontal. The mine is open to the public from around mid-May until September, during daylight hours. Ice forms in the mine during the colder months.

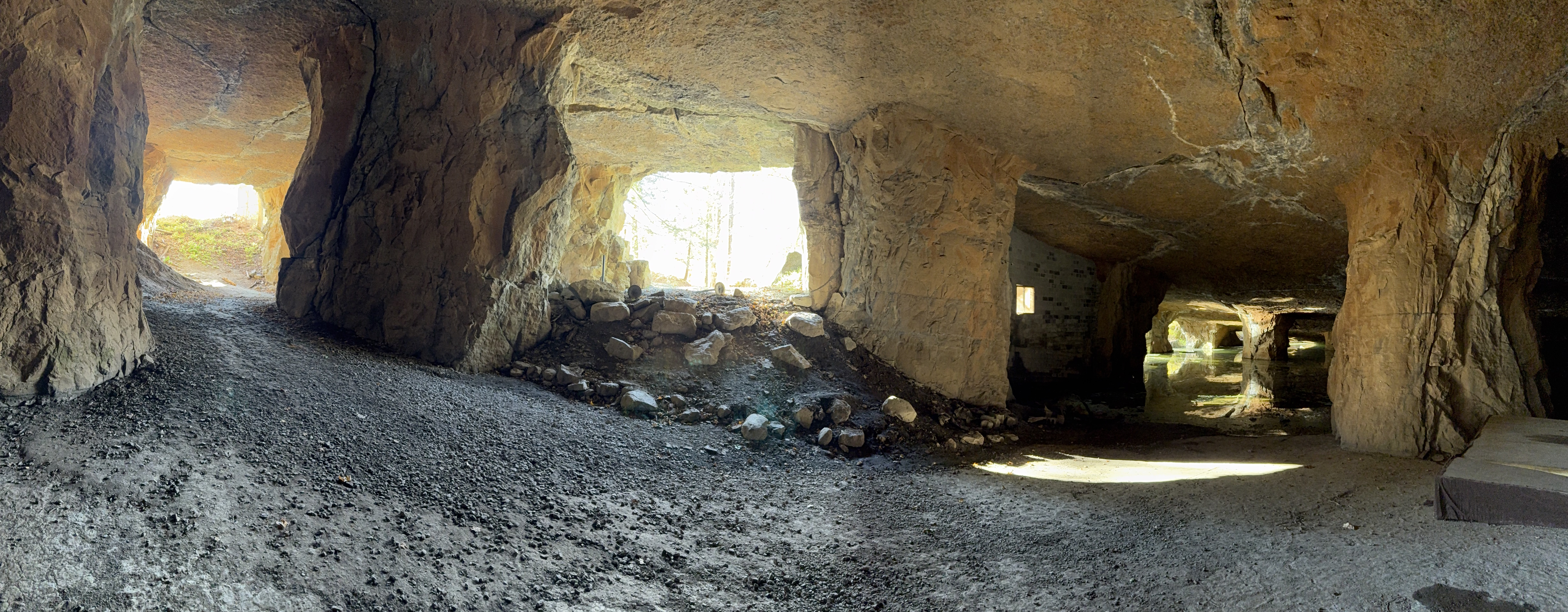
Inside the Widow Jane Mine October 2024

The deep mining operations are inaccessible, as 80% of the mine is underwater. The Widow Jane Mine is purportedly haunted, with encounters reported with "the spirit of a woman in a long white dress darting through the dark depths of the mine." The Snyder Estate has "doggy docents" onsite that help visitors find donation boxes and tour maps.
