= Rosendale Library =

Historic building in New York, United States

- All Saints' Chapel
- U.S. National Register of Historic Places
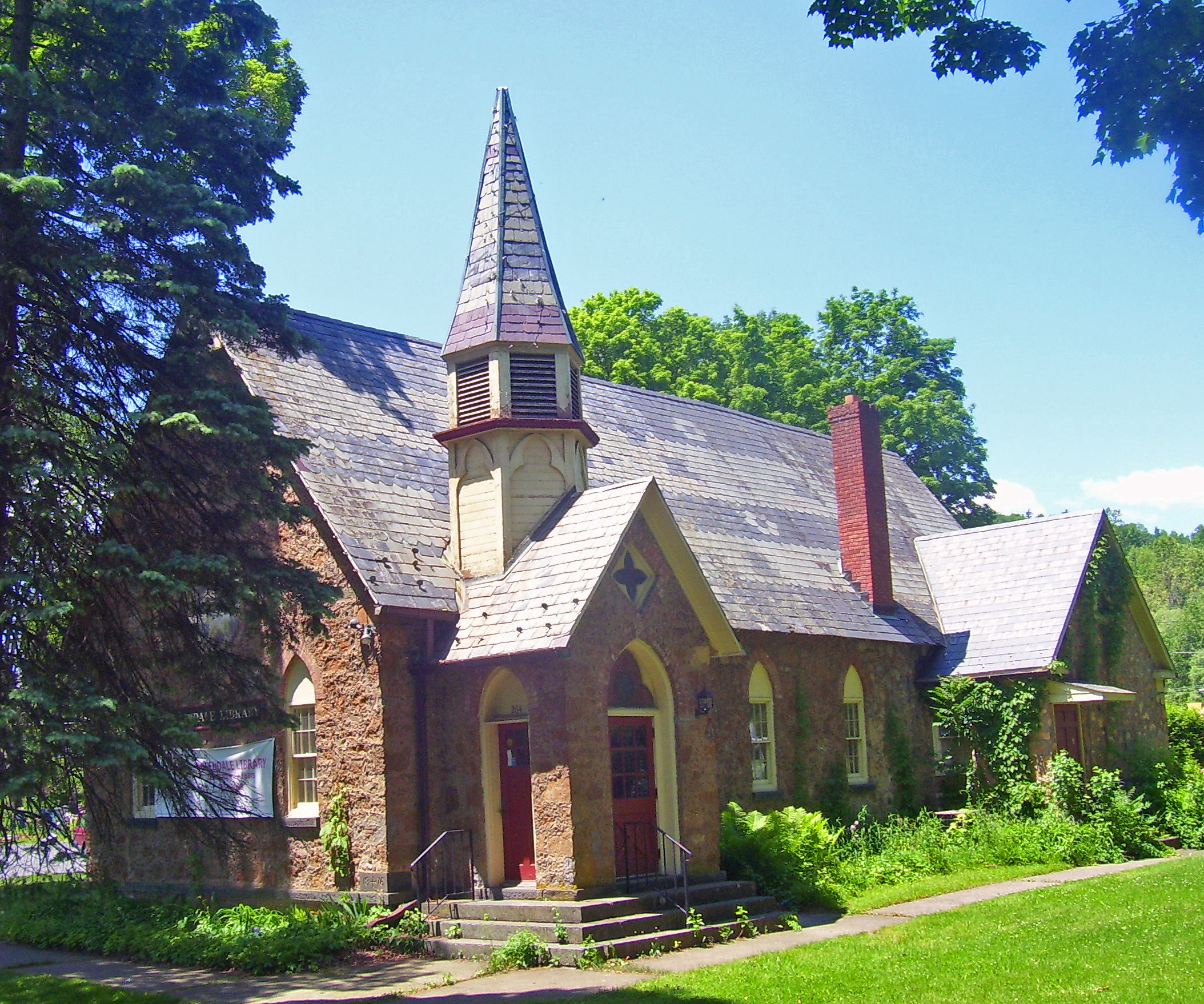
- East profile and south elevation, 2008
- Location: Rosendale, New York
- Nearest city: Kingston
- Coordinates: 41°50′44″N 74°04′32″W
- Area: less than one acre
- Built: 1876
- Architectural style: Gothic Revival
- NRHP reference No.: 86002511
- Added to NRHP: September 11, 1986

The Rosendale Library, formerly the All Saints' Chapel, is located on Main Street (NY 213) in Rosendale, New York, United States. It was originally built as a Gothic Revival Episcopal church from locally mined Rosendale cement, a material which covers the stonework exterior walls.

After floods from nearby Rondout Creek damaged the building in the mid-1950s, the church abandoned it. It also survived a fire in the mid-1970s. A newly formed local library district was created to restore it for use as a library. In 1986 it was added to the National Register of Historic Places.

== Building ==
The chapel is a one-story two-by-five-bay building with a rectangular chancel. Its walls are uncoursed cement rock rubble laid in Rosendale cement, with some embellishments and flourishes at windows and doors. A fire in the mid-1970s required the replacement of much of the original interior decoration, although the original wood ceiling is intact. All but two of the stained-glass windows had to be replaced as well. The building was designed to hold 150 people.

On the exterior, the most prominent feature is the steeply pitched gable decorated with a scroll-sawn triangular insert with a central quatrefoil and three surrounding trefoils. The slate roof tiled in a decorative pattern of scallops and flowers. A small entrance vestibule and vestry are located on opposite ends of the east wall. On the west is a hexagonal spire paneled in a simple Gothic motif down at the base and louvered at the top, and a four-by-two-bay, architecturally sympathetic wing added in the 1970s, not considered contributing due to its lack of age.

== History ==
The opening of the Delaware and Hudson Canal in the late 1820s triggered rapid growth in Rosendale, as in other communities along its route. In 1874, St. Peter's Episcopal Church in nearby Stone Ridge established St. John's Mission to serve worshippers there, and within two years it had grown enough to warrant its own chapel. Two thousand dollars was raised, and the building was built in 1877. The name of the mission was changed to All Saints'.

In 1893 the mission became a parish in its own right, sponsoring missions of its own in the smaller nearby communities of Bloomingdale and Rifton for periods of the early 20th century. In 1956, flooding in the wake of Hurricane Flossy did enough damage to the church that it had to be abandoned, and the parish was dissolved.

Andrew Snyder, a local descendant of the family that had first made a fortune from the cement, bought the building in 1957. He told the local women's club he would donate it for use as a library if they organized it. The club's members formed the Rosendale Library Association, and after restorations and improvements the chapel reopened as the library in 1959.

A 1975 fire damaged the building somewhat, and the original interior finishings and all but two of the stained-glass windows had to be removed and replaced. As part of the repair work, a west wing that had been planned when the building was originally acquired was added.

In the 1980s, after the property was listed on the Register, the New York State Legislature passed legislation, signed by then-governor Mario Cuomo, permitting the creation of a special library district. Voters in Rosendale approved its creation in 1987 and it received its charter from the state Board of Regents two years later.

Work continues on the library building itself. In the 2000s the district obtained a $75,000 state grant to repair the slate roof, and it is currently raising the money required to match it.

== Aesthetics ==
The church's basic design, with its thick walls and lancet windows, is consistent with the English country churches that first used the Gothic Revival style. The arches and brick surrounds of the windows are also consistent with the vernacular styles of churches built by congregants of English descent in the Hudson Valley. Embedded shells in the exterior, and other touches, suggest the Venetian Gothic stylings written about and championed by John Ruskin.

The most unusual aspect of the building's architecture is the exterior finish. The rubblestone, normally left bare in such structures, was instead covered over with Rosendale cement, suggesting a desire to showcase a locally produced building material that had made many residents and congregants prosperous.

== See also ==
- Mid-Hudson Library System

== Bibliography ==
- Sylvester, Nathaniel Bartlett (1994) [1880]. History of Ulster County, New York, with Illustrations and Biographical Sketches of its Prominent Men and Pioneers: Part Second: History of the Towns of Ulster County. Philadelphia, PA: Everts & Peck. ISBN 978-1-55787-130-5.
