= Joppenbergh Mountain =

Mountain in Ulster County, New York

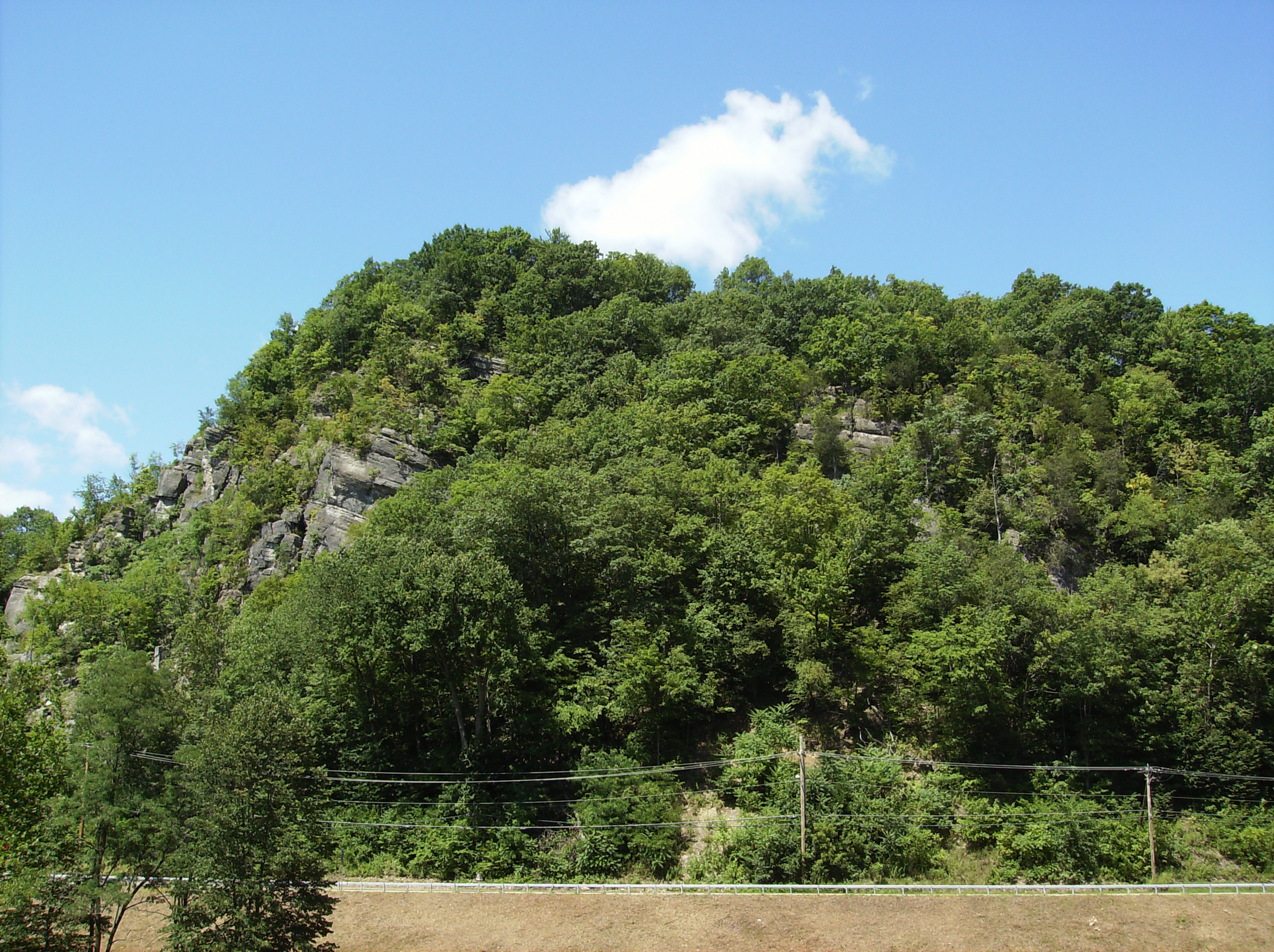
- Joppenbergh Mountain, viewed from across the Rondout Creek

Highest point
- Elevation: Nearly 500 feet (150 m)
- Listing: List of mountains of New York
- Coordinates: 41°50′45″N 74°05′08″W

Geography
- Location within New York Location within the United States
- Location: Rosendale Village, New York, U.S.
- Topo map: Rosendale Quadrangle

Geology
- Rock age: Paleozoic

Joppenbergh Mountain is a nearly 500-foot (152 m) mountain in Rosendale Village, a hamlet in the town of Rosendale, in Ulster County, New York. The mountain is composed of a carbonate bedrock overlain by glacially deposited material. It was named after Rosendale's founder, Jacob Rutsen, and mined throughout the late 19th century for dolomite that was used in the manufacture of natural cement. Extensive mining caused a large cave-in on December 19, 1899, that destroyed equipment and collapsed shafts within Joppenbergh. Though it was feared that several workers had been killed, the collapse happened while all the miners were outside, eating lunch. Since the collapse, the mountain has experienced shaking and periodic rockfalls.

During the late 1930s, Joppenbergh became the site of several ski jumping competitions, which continued until the early 1940s. The original slope was designed by Harold Schelderup for Rosendale's first competition in 1937; Schelderup himself skied that July, after the slope was coated with borax for a summer competition. Several Olympic skiers participated in the competitions. Skiing began again in the 1960s, when a new slope was built on the mountain, and the revived competitions continued until 1971.

The town of Rosendale considered buying land near the mountain in 2003 for parking, and the following year, the town leased a tract of land to build a municipal parking lot. Joppenbergh was put up for sale in 2009, and in March 2011, the Open Space Institute (OSI) offered to purchase the entire 117-acre (47 ha) property and sell it to the town. The Rosendale town board initially agreed to the deal the following month, with payment planned to come from a surplus fund. That June, however, the board found that the surplus fund had already been exhausted and could not cover the entire cost of the purchase. Ultimately, the OSI completed its purchase of Joppenbergh in October 2011, without town money.

== Name ==
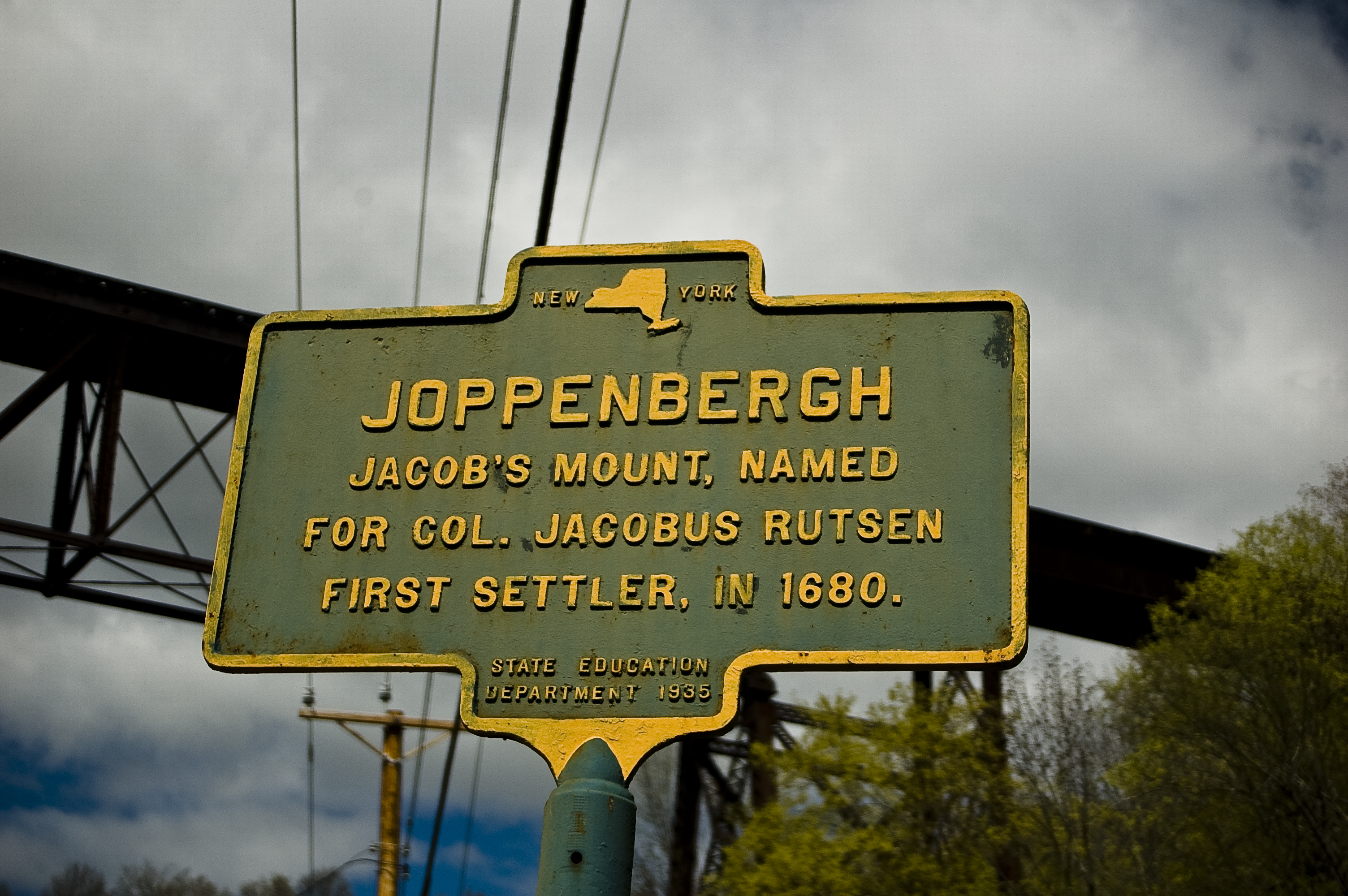
A historic marker placed by the New York State Education Department, describing Joppenbergh as the namesake of Rosendale's founder

Joppenbergh is named after Colonel Jacob Rutsen, born Jacobsen Rutger van Schoonderwoerdt. Rutsen was a merchant, and the son of a Dutch immigrant, from Albany; he founded the first settlement in what is now the town of Rosendale, New York, in the late 17th century. The spelling of the mountain's name has been disputed, and has been rendered as Joppenberg and Joppenburgh. It has also been called Jacob's Nose, Jacob's Mount, and, in an early 18th-century deed, Jobsenbright.

== Geology ==
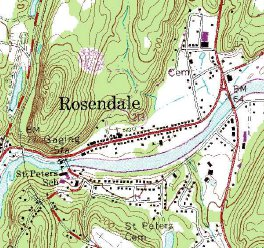
A topographic map of Rosendale, showing Joppenbergh's contour lines (upper left)

Sources differ on whether Joppenbergh is 485 feet (148 m) or 495 feet (151 m). Both measurements give Joppenbergh a lower elevation than the highest point in the town of Rosendale, a 600-foot (180 m) peak of the Shawangunk Ridge.

The bedrock underlying the mountain is composed of limestone and dolomite members of the Helderberg Group, laid during the Paleozoic era. Most of the Helderberg carbonates in Rosendale are located north of the Rondout Creek, and have given Rosendale a karst topography, resulting in "sink holes, disappearing streams, caves, and springs". The mountain's surface is composed of unconsolidated, glacially deposited outwash and till, with several outcrops exposing Joppenbergh's bedrock. Soils have been mapped as Farmington-Rock outcrop complex. In some areas, the soil depth is less than 20 inches (51 cm), which hinders groundwater filtration. Other parts of the mountain have a steep, 30 percent grade. These areas, comprising nearly 75 percent of the 117-acre (47 ha) property, cannot be easily developed.

== History ==
=== Mining collapses ===
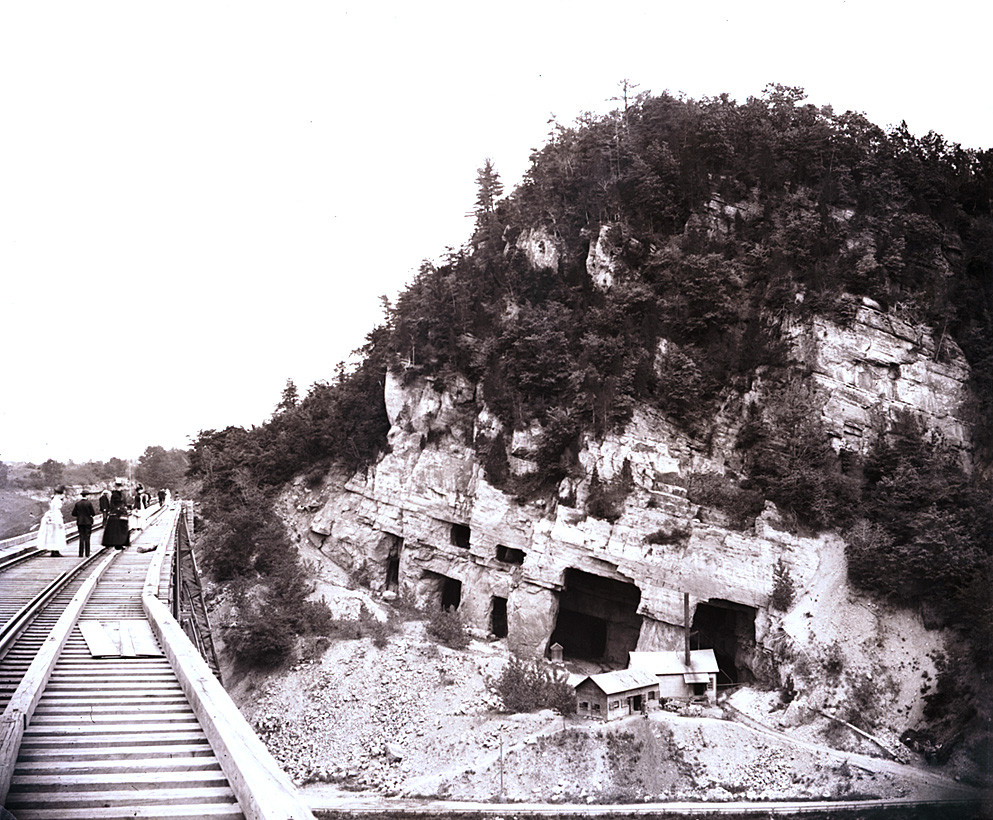
Cement mines on Joppenbergh Mountain before its 1899 collapse

In 1825, engineers working on the Delaware and Hudson Canal found extensive outcrops of dolomite in the region, which enabled the production of natural cement. The rocks contained dolomite of the Upper Silurian's Rondout formation. Joppenbergh was rich in the mineral, and was mined. Several quarries operated on the mountain, including the New York and Rosendale Cement Company, and the James Cement Company. No one company had complete control of the entire mountain.

By late December 1899, mining had compromised Joppenbergh's integrity enough to cause a series of landslides, followed by a large cave-in on December 19. Four collapses occurred that day, beginning at 8 AM, and culminating in the 11:30 AM collapse of the Black Smoke Mine shaft network. Though it was initially believed that fifteen workers had been killed, the collapse happened while all 150 men were outside of the mountain, eating lunch.

The collapse rendered the canal and nearby road impassable, and caused a boiler explosion that shook the nearby Rosendale trestle. At the time of the collapse, the total cost of the damage was estimated to be between $20,000 and $25,000. Another, larger collapse happened the following week, late at night. This cave-in was believed to have been caused by the December 19 collapse. Shortly after the landslides, "swarms of gawking spectators" crowded the village to photograph the debris; one such photograph was alleged to depict the Madonna. Frequent rockfalls as a result of mining led to calls to destroy the mountain in 1907.

=== Skiing competitions ===
Throughout the 1930s the tourist industry in Rosendale flourished, generating almost $700,000 each year between spring and autumn. The Rosendale Township Association, founded in 1934 to encourage tourism in the town, sought out new activities to attract tourists to Rosendale during the winter. In 1936 the association asked a Brooklyn-based telemark skiing club to build its new 40-meter (130 ft) ski jumping slope in Rosendale. The group leased Joppenbergh from owner Warren Sammons.

Rosendale's first ski jumping competition was held on January 24, 1937. The ski track was designed by Harold Schelderup, a ski hill designer from Norway. Bad weather caused the cancellation of competitive events, but a skiing exhibition still occurred. That April, the Telemark club held a special dinner in Brooklyn to honor members who performed well in the January competition. The club planned to hold a summer competition by covering the mountain with "straw and pine needles". Harold Schelderup, who was recognized at the dinner for his skills, performed in the summer tournament. Joppenbergh's ski track was coated with borax, and the tournament was held on July 18, 1937 at 2:30 in the afternoon, with enough parking provided for 500 cars. In front of a crowd of 3,300 people, "jumpers took off from an in-run covered with borax and landed on a hill covered with mats and carpets topped with straw and borax".

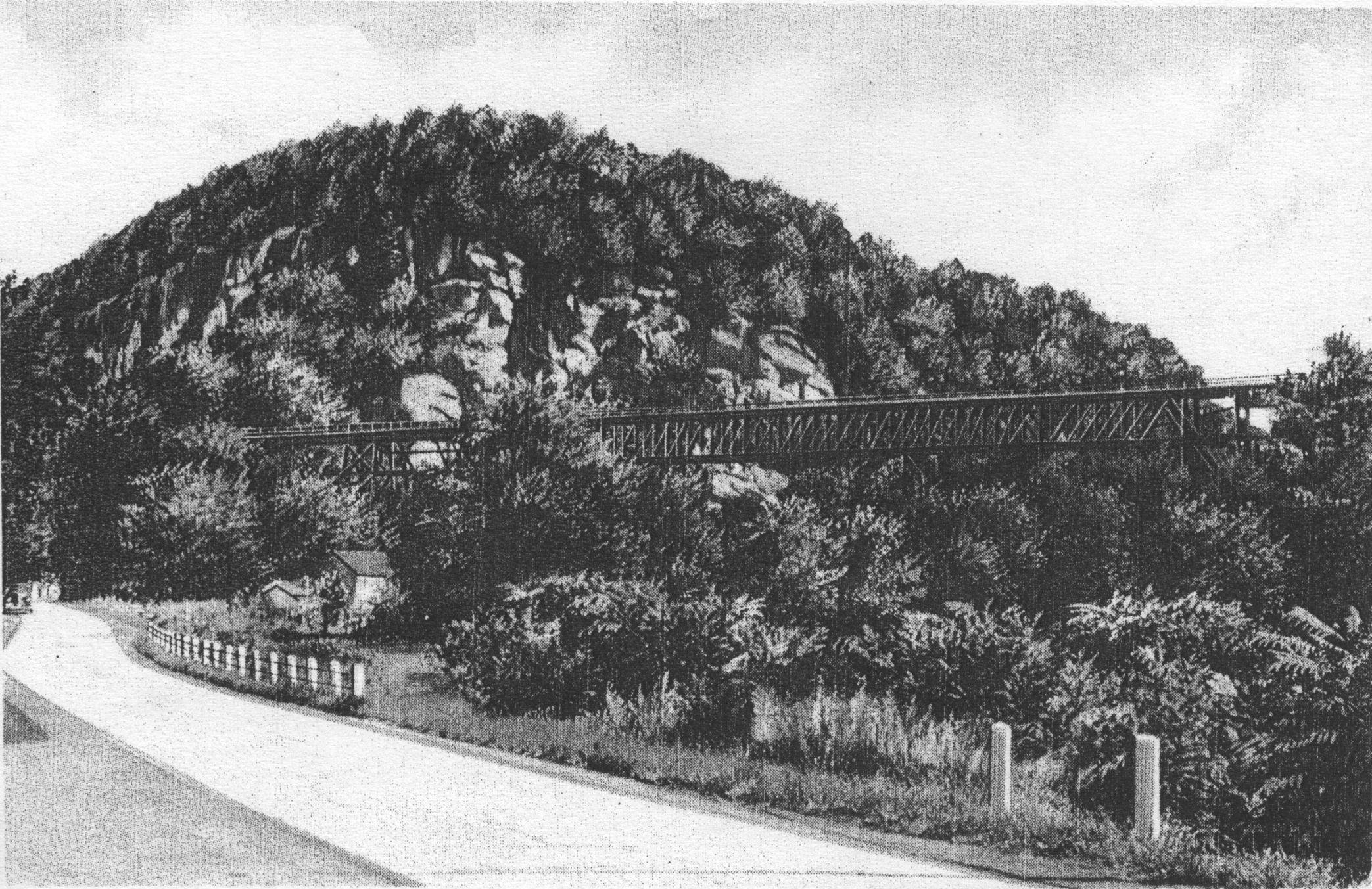
A depiction of Joppenbergh and the nearby Rosendale trestle, during the time period in which ski jumping began on the mountain's slopes

Olympic skier Ottar Satre set a record jump of 112 feet (34 m) in 1937. The following year a 25-foot (7.6 m) extension was placed atop the mountain to increase jumpers' distance. Although Satre's 112-foot (34 m) record was expected to be beaten by more than 30 feet (9.1 m), the winner of the January 23, 1938 competition was Norwegian skier Nils Eie, who jumped only 128 feet (39 m). Harold Schelderup also participated in the competition, which was held the week after he won a separate tournament in White Plains. Another Joppenbergh tournament was planned for March 7, 1938. Competitions were held in 1940 and 1941. The length of the slope was increased to 50 meters (160 ft) in 1941, but the United States' entrance into World War II caused skiers to enter the military, and competitions were not held after the war.

Skiing resumed on Joppenbergh in the 1960s. The Rosendale Nordic Ski Club was organized on January 11, 1964, and immediately created the Joppenbergh Mountain Corporation (JMC) to manage the Joppenbergh property. Three hundred shares of stock were issued for the JMC, priced at $100 per share, to build a new slope – and to buy the mountain itself for $20,000 from its owner, Mary Sammons. The JMC gained control of the property on August 20, 1964, and immediately announced its intent to build a new ski slope on the site of the original one, as well as a parking lot capable of holding 10,000 cars. The goal of the club was to make Rosendale the "Nordic Ski Capital of the East". A new 70-meter (230 ft) slope was completed on November 14, 1965, and augmented by a snowmaking system to provide artificial snow. When a ski jumping competition was held on January 30, 1966, skier Leif Bringslimark achieved a 152-foot (46 m) jump from the new slope. Competitions were held January 22, 1967 and January 27, 1968. The winner of the 1968 tournament was Per Coucheron, a 22-year-old Dartmouth student who reached 206 feet (63 m). The slope was icy prior to the competition; a snowmaking machine was used the night before the jump, and club members, as well as the competitors themselves, "help[ed] manicure the slope". When the jump began, the slope was in fine condition.

The Rosendale Outing Ski Club organized a competition on January 25 and 26, 1969, attended by a crowd of 3,000 people. Olympic medalist Franz Keller jumped 212 feet (65 m) down a 65-meter (213 ft) slope on Joppenbergh, though he managed to reach 214 feet (65 m) during practice. It had rained the week before the competition, and although 20 truckloads of snow were brought in, the condition of the track was "extremely fast". Several participants fell, and one was brought to a hospital in Kingston.

A jump took place on January 18, 1970, the same year that the Rosendale Outing Ski Club became part of the Rosendale Nordic Ski Club. The new club organized Rosendale's final skiing competition, which took place on February 6 and 7, 1971. Keller's 212-foot (65 m) record was broken twice on February 6, by Middlebury College student Hugh Barber. The 185-pound (84 kg) Barber reached heights of 213 feet (65 m) and 217 feet (66 m) during the competition, and 226 feet (69 m) during practice, in front of 3,500 spectators. Although Barber believed the ski hill was in "great condition", 10 to 15 percent of participants had fallen during the tournament. Consistently unfavorable weather conditions and a lack of profitability were the major reasons skiing stopped on Joppenbergh; the poor design of the slope, as well as infighting among ski club members, also contributed. The slope was subsequently abandoned, and an adjacent facility, for the ski jumps, fell into disuse. The JMC continued to own and maintain the property after skiing ceased.

=== Modern use ===
Periodic rockfalls continue to happen, with debris sliding down the mountain face. In 1984, State Route 213 was moved 50 feet (15 m) away from Joppenbergh and closer to Rondout Creek to protect motorists. A retaining wall was put up at the foot of the mountain to prevent falling rocks from rolling onto the street. During the 1980s, Vidacable TV Systems leased part of the mountain from the JMC to set up an antenna. Cellular One considered building a 180-foot (55 m) cell tower on top of Joppenbergh in 1992, but decided not to do so. Although there was public opposition to the proposal, Cellular One stated that local sentiment was not a factor in its decision against building the tower. In 1995 the mountain was studied by the New York Public Service Commission to determine a possible route for new transmission lines laid by a local energy utility.

The body of a 25-year-old substitute teacher from Kingston, Amy Glauner, was found on Joppenbergh after an October 1998 search. Police determined that she died of head trauma following a fall. Her car had been found in a parking lot by the mountain.

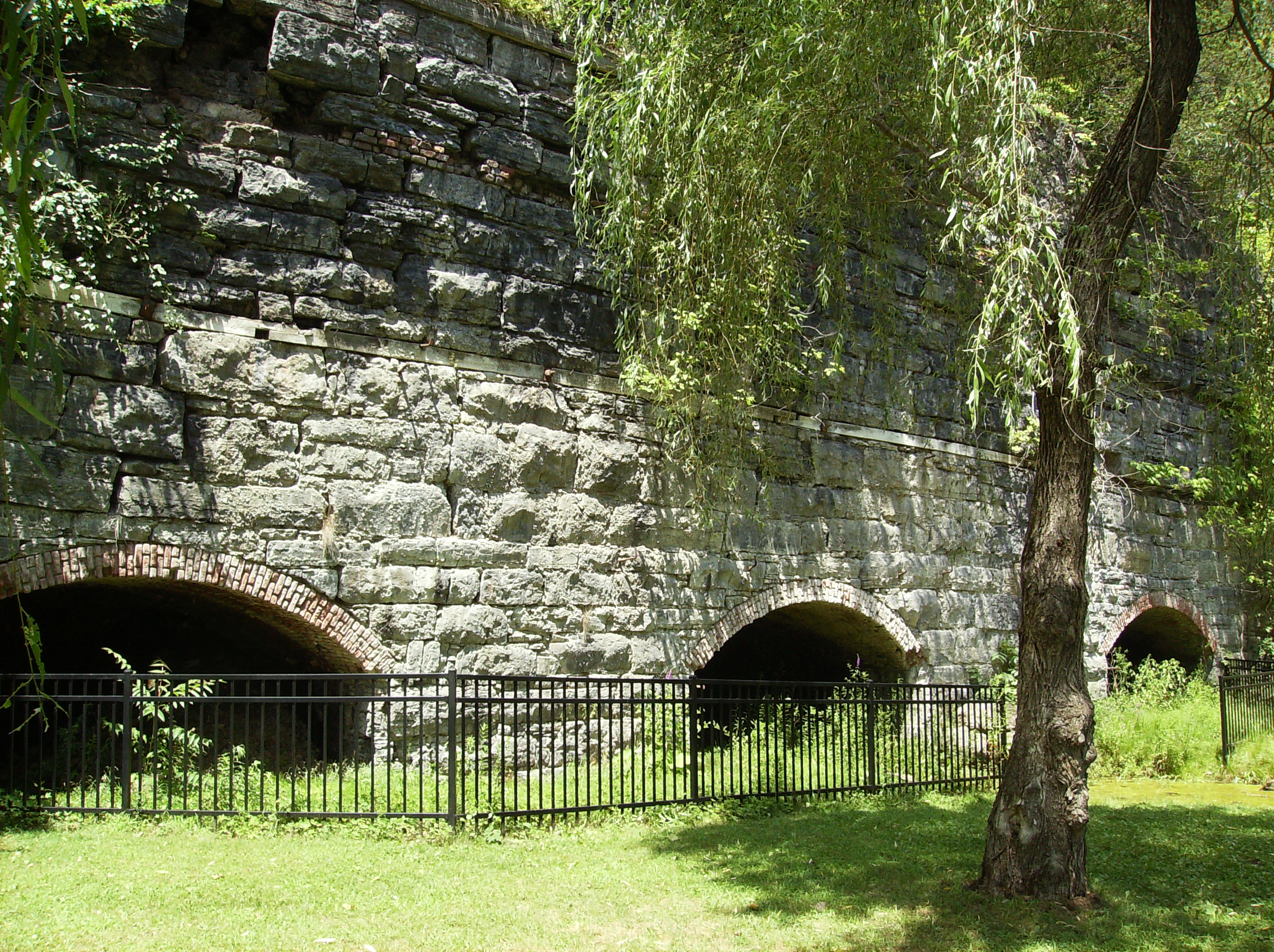
Defunct cement kilns in Willow Kiln Park, at the base of Joppenbergh

In 2003, the town of Rosendale considered either leasing a tract of land near Joppenbergh, or purchasing a 1 1/2-acre (0.61 ha) lot, to expand parking on Main Street. The lot belonged to former village mayor Joseph Reid, who refused to sell it to the town. Although the town board considered using eminent domain to acquire Reid's property, it agreed in June 2004 to lease the Joppenbergh property instead, for a period of 10 years, at a rate of $3,500 each year. One member of the town board opposed the deal because it would not secure the land beyond the 10-year term. The lease allowed the town to create a park by the municipal lot, Willow Kiln Park, which contains several defunct cement kilns. Willow Kiln Park has served as the setting of an art show and, following a zombie-themed street festival, a concert.

Though the JMC had been unwilling to sell its land in 2004, by December 2009 the entire mountain was put up for sale, for $500,000. Before 2009, the assessed value of the property was only about $50,000. In early March 2011, the Open Space Institute (OSI) offered to purchase the 117-acre (47 ha) property – which had, by that time, been reassessed at $240,000 – for $185,000, and sell it to the town for $85,000. The deal would create an easement with the town, allowing only noncommercial use of the mountain while preserving the municipal parking lot at its base. While some government officials viewed such an acquisition as a permanent solution to the hamlet's parking problems, other officials viewed the loss of tax revenue from the privately owned property to be undesirable.

More than 175 people showed up for a rancorous public hearing over the purchase on April 6, 2011. During the hearing, members of the Rosendale town board determined that the tax income from the entire property was much less than the cost of renting part of it for parking. Residents brought up several issues, such as the liability the town would assume from falling rocks, and sinkholes. Other issues discussed were the lack of road access to the parking lot, and whether the property should be used commercially. An individual living adjacent to the property, Brett Hansen, expressed a strong desire to buy it and build additional parking lots, as well as an amphitheater. Proponents of the purchase described how ownership of Joppenbergh would allow Rosendale to connect the Wallkill Valley Rail Trail with Main Street, and how property values near the mountain would increase. The town board agreed to the purchase in a 3–2 vote on April 13.

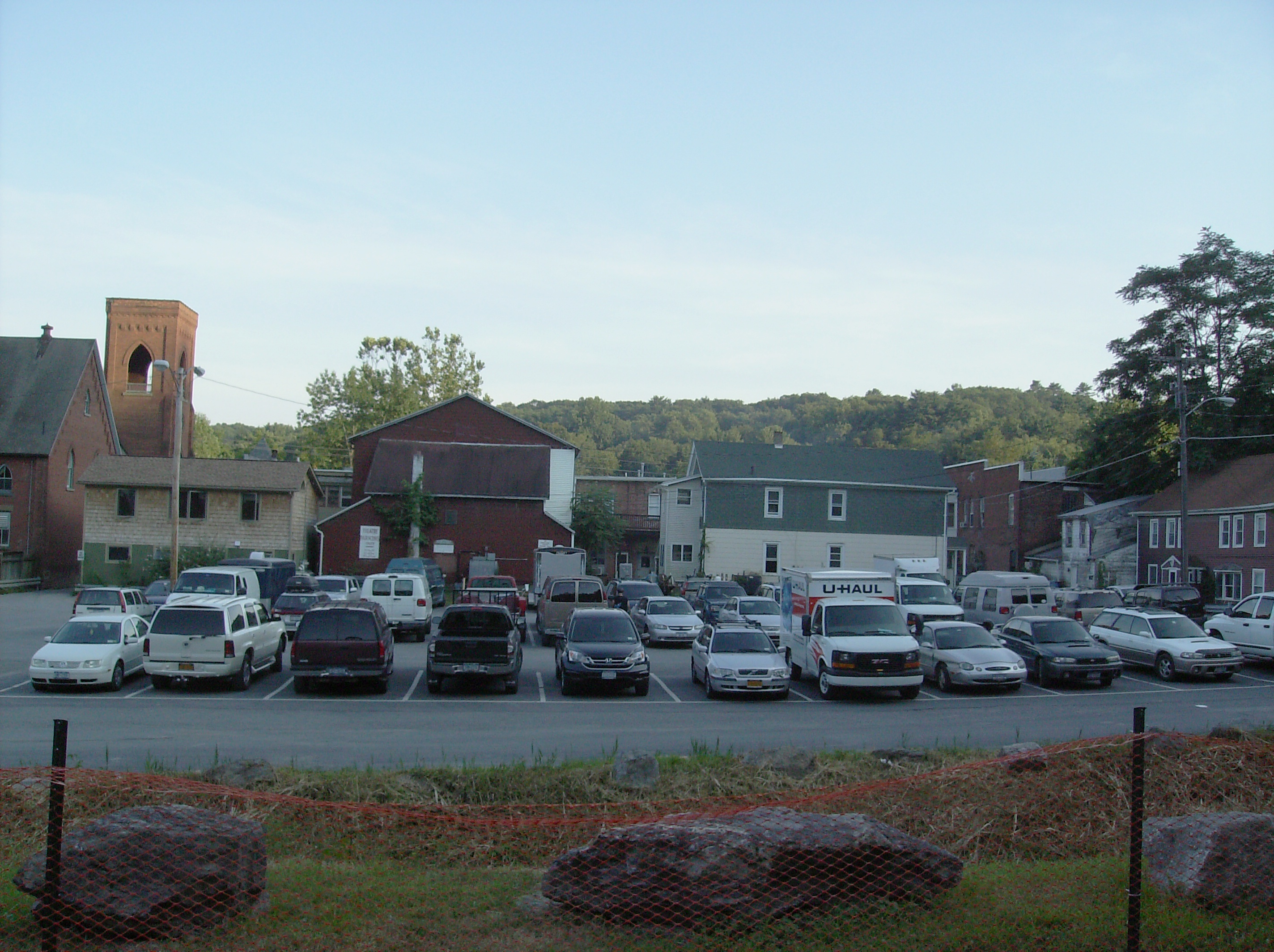
The municipal parking lot behind Main Street, leased by the town of Rosendale since 2004

Although a 17-page petition with 298 signatures in favor of a public referendum was presented at the meeting, the board felt that OSI funds would not be available by the proposed November referendum. Opponents of the board's decision protested it by placing signs near the mountain deriding the purchase as an unwise expenditure. The town was not legally obligated to hold a referendum, regardless of public sentiment, because the money budgeted for the purchase was not borrowed; board members planned to tap a $340,000 surplus fund, generated by the 2010 sale of town land to the OSI, which intended to allow bouldering on the property. The $340,000 fund was originally intended for capital improvements, specifically the construction of a new town hall, but a June 2011 audit of the town's 2010 budget found that a large part of the surplus had already been used to offset budget and tax shortfalls; only $79,000 remained available.

Several local businesses considered contributing money to the mountain's purchase. Such funding would be considered surplus, and would not be subject to referendum. Owners of businesses on Main Street expressed concern at the June 1 town board meeting that the cost of parking would increase if the property was purchased by a third party. One board member estimated that without paying rent, the town would recoup the cost of the property within 12 years. Ulster County Area Transit expressed a desire to route its buses through the property, creating a connection to the Mohonk Preserve. A nonprofit organization, the Joppenbergh Mountain Preservation Association, was created in June 2011 to raise funding to purchase the mountain, the parking lot, and Willow Kiln Park.

In an effort to reduce the purchase price, the town board asked the mountain's current owners to discount the final four years of rent on the parking lot, a cost of $32,000. The town considered buying only the parking lot and Willow Kiln Park, but the JMC's lawyer indicated that the 117-acre (47 ha) property would not be divided. Ultimately, the OSI bought Joppenbergh without any financial assistance from the town, gaining ownership of the property in October 2011, although the sale was not completed until December 20, 2011. By that time, most of the JMC's stockholders had died, and ownership of the property generated so little income that it served "no further business purpose". Joppenbergh was a point of contention during the town's November 2011 elections, with Republicans criticizing the affair as "reflect[ing] poorly on town Democrats' fiscal management skills". The town of Rosendale approached the OSI in January 2012 to renew its lease of the parking lot, which was set to expire at the end of 2013.

In 2012 the OSI transferred ownership of the property to a local conservancy, the Wallkill Valley Land Trust (WVLT). An informal association of businesses, the Joppenbergh Mountain Advisory Group (JMAG), began working with the WVLT to create a land use policy. The WVLT began having monthly meetings with the JMAG, and with town and state departments; its stated goal was to combine Joppenbergh's development with the rehabilitation of the adjacent railroad trestle and subsequent expansion of the rail trail. In late September 2012, the WVLT held a hearing on a proposed land use plan that would allow deer hunting on the property beginning in 2013, and would prohibit entry into several caves on the mountain.

== Bibliography ==
- Clearwater, Alphonso T. (1907). The History of Ulster County, New York. Kingston, New York: W.J. Van Deusen. OCLC 329012489.
- Genero, Peter P. (2005). Thank Rosendale: New York – The Empire State. Fort Pierce, Florida: Genero Inc. ISBN 0-9759419-1-7.
- Gilchrist, Ann (1976). Footsteps Across Cement: A History of the Township of Rosendale, New York. Woodstock, New York: Lith Art. OCLC 2597851.
- Perls, Jeffrey (2003). Shawangunks Trail Companion: A Complete Guide to Hiking, Mountain Biking, Cross-Country Skiing, and More Only 90 Miles from New York City. Woodstock, Vermont: Countryman Press. ISBN 978-0-88150-563-4.
- Ulster County Historians (1984). The History of Ulster County, With Emphasis upon the Last 100 Years, 1883–1983. Kingston, New York: Ulster County Historians. OCLC 11345209.
