= From the Caves of the Iron Mountain =

Studio album by Steve Gorn, Tony Levin, Jerry Marotta
- Released: 1997
- Recorded: Widow Jane Mine, New York City
- Genre: Acoustic
- Length: 50:35
- Label: Papa Bear Records

From the Caves of the Iron Mountain is a music album by Tony Levin, Jerry Marotta and Steve Gorn released in 1997 on Papa Bear Records.

The album was recorded inside the Widow Jane Mine in the Catskill Mountains, New York by Tchad Blake using a binaural microphone setup. The recording technique makes the album very enjoyable when listening with headphones.

The instruments featured on this album include Chapman Stick, NS electric upright bass, various reed and East Indian flute instruments, a range of percussion instruments and even a short passage of squeezebox played by Jerry Marotta.

== Track listing ==
1. "Approaching the Cavern" - 1:26
2. "Man Walking from A to B" - 3:40
3. "In the Caves of the Iron Mountain" - 3:35
4. "Drumming on Water" - 3:30
5. "Devil's Kitchen" - 3:50
6. "Shakers in Five" - 3:54
7. "Glass Beads" - 3:26
8. "Joyous Lake" - 2:35
9. "Catskill Gallery" - 8:06
10. "Shepherd's song" - 3:37
11. "Catacombs" - 4:17
12. "Magic Meadow" - 3:44
13. "The Widow Jane Mine" - 3:11
14. "Squeeze Box" - 1:02
