= Steve Gorn =

American musician (born 1944)

- Born: Steven Peter Gorn; 1944 (age 81–82); New York City, U.S.A.
- Instruments: bansuri, saxophone
- Website: stevegorn.com

Steve Gorn (born 1944) in New York City) is a bansuri (bamboo flute) and saxophone player.

Gorn has performed Indian classical music, jazz and new American music on the bansuri bamboo flute and soprano saxophone in concerts and festivals throughout the world. A disciple of the late bansuri master, Sri Gour Goswami of Calcutta, he has been praised by critics and leading Indian musicians as one of the few westerners recognized to have captured the subtlety and beauty of Indian music. He also has composed numerous works for theatre, dance and television and has recorded and performed with a wide range of artists including Paul Simon, Tony Levin, Jack DeJohnette, Glen Velez, Karl Berger, Alessandra Belloni, Layne Redmond, Simon Shaheen and Mick Karn.

== Discography ==
- Asian Journal (Music of the World, 1979)
- Bansuri Bamboo Flute (Music of the World, 1980, 1982)
- Yantra: Flute and Tabla with Badal Roy (Music of the World, 1983)
- Luminous Ragas with Marc Levinson, 1991
- Steel & Bamboo with Robert Dick, 1993
- Dancing with Nature Spirits, with Jack DeJohnette, Michael Cain, 1996
- From the Caves of the Iron Mountain with Tony Levin, Jerry Marotta, 1997
- Wings and Shadows with Warren Senders
- Pampara: In Memory of Gour Goswami with Annalisa Adami, Samir Chatterjee, 1996
- Pranam with Samir Chatterjee, Barun Kumar Pal, David Taylor, 1999
- The Green Bird, Elliot Goldenthal musical in which he performed, 2000
- 2000 live with Bill Buchen, Hallie Laxmi, 2000
- Drala with Anandi, Bill Buchen, Amitava Chatterjee, Randy Crafton, Mark Egan, Cyndi Lee, David Nichtern 2001
- Colors of the Mind with Kevin Bents, David Marino, Barun Kumar Pal, Falguni Shah, Stomu Takeishi, Gordon Titcomb, 2002
- Midnight Flower with Keven Bents, Ty Burhoe, Clifford Carter, Mark Egan, Jamey Haddad, Matt Kilmer, Falguni Shah, Shane Shanahan, 2003
- Dreaming Mexico with Georg Hofmann, Raul Tudon, 2004
- Priyagitah: The Nightingale with David Michael, Michael Stirling, Benjy Wertheimer, 2004
- Meditate with Pamela Miles, 2007
- Rasika with Samir Chatterjee, Hallie Laxmi, 2007
- Song of the Swan with Natraj, 2008
- Luminosity with Len & Vani Greene, 2011
- So Beautiful or So What with Paul Simon, 2011
