= New Paltz, New York =

New Paltz may refer to:

- Town of New Paltz, a town in New York
- Village of New Paltz contained entirely within the town
  - New Paltz Downtown Historic District, national historic district located in the village.
- State University of New York at New Paltz

== See also ==
- New Paltz station
