= Mike Ricci =

Mike Ricci may refer to:

- Mike Ricci (ice hockey)
- Mike Ricci (fighter)
- Mike Ricci (racing driver)
