= Rich Ricci Jr. =

American racing driver (born 1966)

- Nationality: American
- Born: Richard J. Ricci Jr. June 30, 1966 (age 60) New Paltz (town), New York
- Retired: 2024
- Debut season: 1982

Modified racing career
- Car number: 1a, 55, 406
- Championships: 11
- Wins: 153

Rich Ricci Jr. (born June 30, 1966) is a retired American dirt modified stock car driver.

== Racing career ==
Rich Ricci Jr. began racing in go karts, motocross and snowmobiles before first climbing into a Sportsman Modified in 1982. He claimed first win 1984 at Accord Speedway, New York.

The next year, Ricci added wins at Orange County Fair Speedway in Middletown, New York and Nazareth Speedway in Pennsylvania, while going on to win 9 track championships at Accord between 1987 and 2014. Before retiring, Ricci claimed victories at 11 different tracks across New York, Pennsylvania, and Southeastern Canada.

In 2000, Ricci joined with car owner Jody Gable to capture the big-block championship at Lebanon Valley Speedway in West Lebanon, New York, and the venue's 2001 small-block modified crown.

== Personal life ==
Ricci comes from a racing family. He competed against his son and daughter, Rich III and Allison, his brother Mike, and his nephew, Jimmy Wells. His father, Rich Ricci Sr. began driving race cars in the early years of the sport before stepping. back to the crew chief role for his children and grandchildren.
