= New Paltz station =

Former railroad station in New Paltz, New York

New Paltz
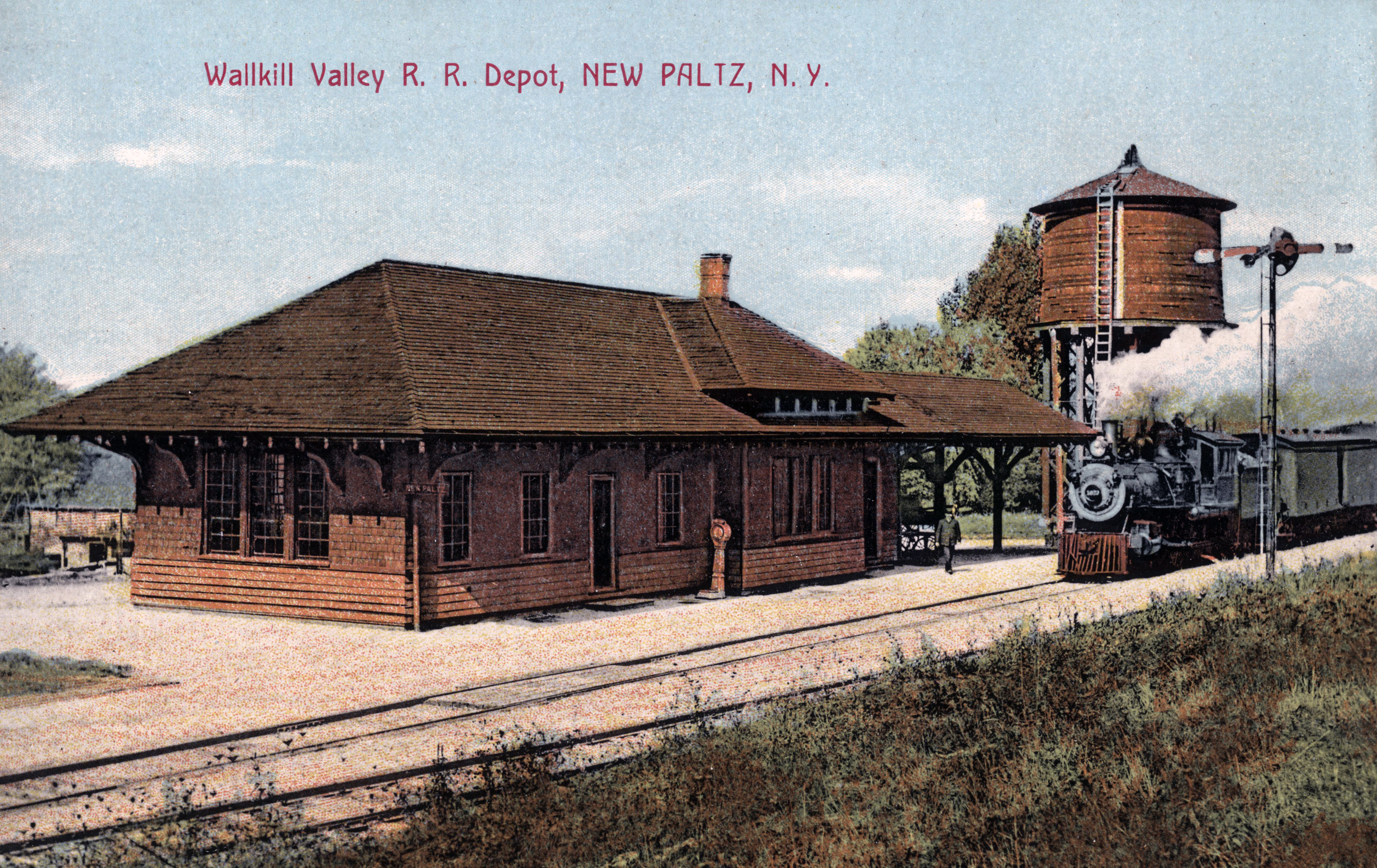
- The station, depicted after its 1907 reconstruction

General information
- Location: 5 Main Street, New Paltz, New York 12561
- Coordinates: 41°44′49″N 74°05′20″W
- Owner: Richard Ronkese

Construction
- Parking: 18 spots

History
- Opened: December 20, 1870; 155 years ago
- Closed: December 1958; 67 years ago
- Rebuilt: 1988; 38 years ago

Former services
Preceding station	New York Central Railroad	Following station
Springtown toward Kingston	Wallkill Valley Branch	Forest Glen toward Montgomery
Location

New Paltz station is a former train station (Note: In North America, the terms "depot" and "station" have historically been interchangeable for such structures.) in the village of New Paltz in Ulster County, New York, United States. The building was the first of two railroad stations constructed in the town of New Paltz, and it is the only former Wallkill Valley Railroad station standing at its original location.

After a lengthy public debate over whether to place the station to the east or west of the Wallkill River, it was built in 1870 on the east bank, within the village of New Paltz. The rail line was formally opened during a large ceremony on December 20, 1870. A decade later the station had become a popular departure point for the Mohonk Mountain House by many vacationers, including two U.S. presidents. In the late 19th century, over a dozen stagecoaches ran between the station and Mohonk daily.

The station burned down in 1907 and was rebuilt later that year. The rise of the automobile caused the railroad to end passenger service in 1937; by 1959 the station was completely closed and sold off. After closure, it was used for a variety of businesses, including serving as a public-access television station. Freight service along the Wallkill Valley line continued until 1977, when the corridor was shut to regular rail traffic.

The building was in such a state of disrepair by the 1980s that it was almost demolished, and the nearby tracks were torn up and sold for scrap by 1984. However, the station avoided demolition and was renovated in 1988. It was used as a real estate office, and the rail corridor itself was formally opened five years later as the Wallkill Valley Rail Trail. In 1999, the station building reopened as Italian restaurant. The building was expanded in 2003 and served as the setting for a scene in a 2008 mob film.

== Planning and construction ==
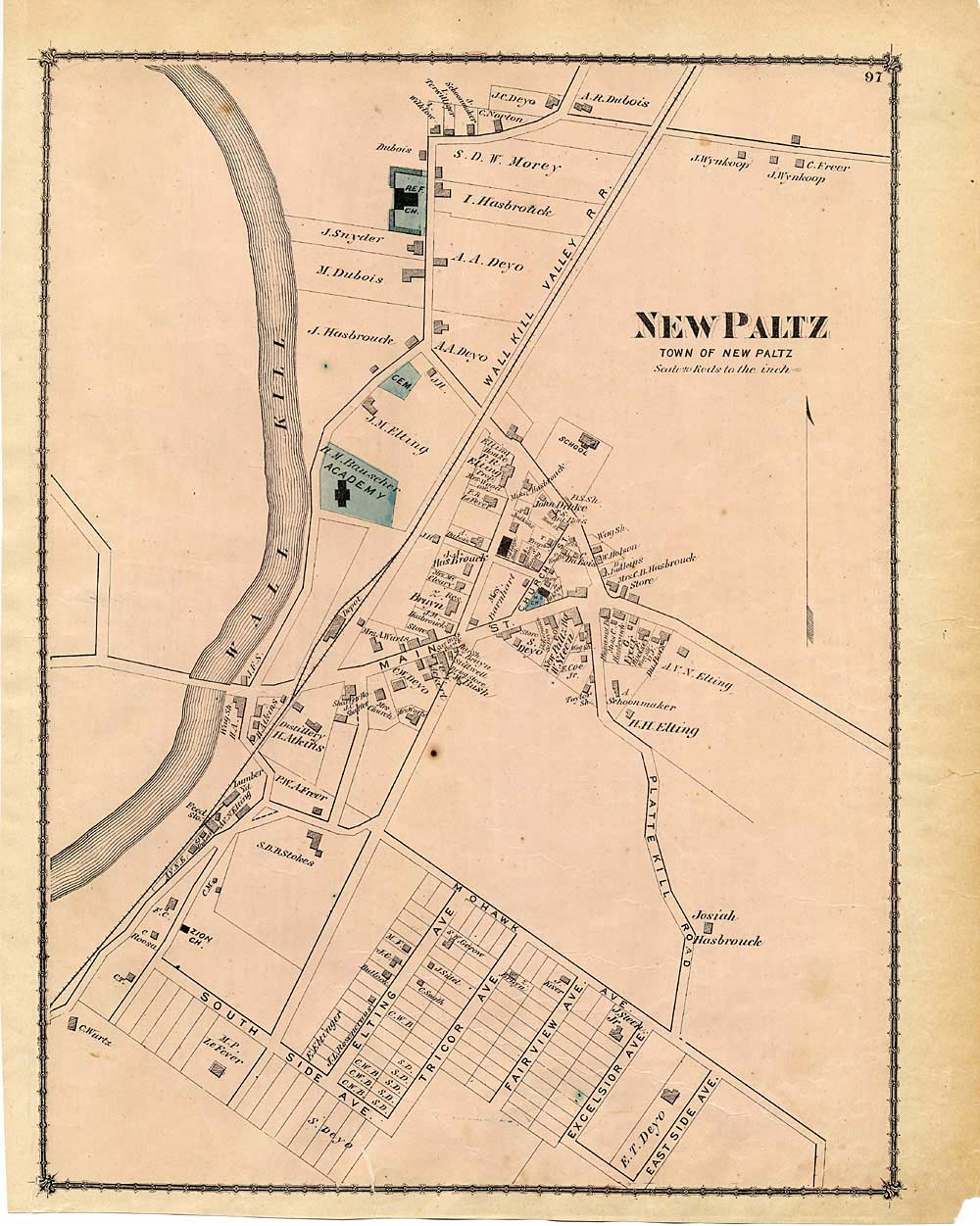
This 1875 map shows the newly built rail depot in the village, east of the Wallkill River.

In February 1864, plans were in place to extend the route of the proposed Wallkill Valley Railroad between the towns of Shawangunk and New Paltz. A civil engineering survey to determine a possible route and cost of such an endeavor was undertaken in March of that year. The proposal sparked a controversy as to whether the route would run east or west of the Wallkill River in New Paltz. The western route was roughly 100 feet (30 m) shorter, and the eastern route would cost $25,000 more. However, it was felt that the increased economic activity from having the rail line run east of the river, and directly through the village of New Paltz, would offset the expense. Bonding for the rail line through New Paltz, at a cost of $123,000, was completed by January 1869. The Wallkill Valley Railroad was the first rail line in Ulster County, and was heralded as a cure for the region's isolation from the rest of the industrialized world.

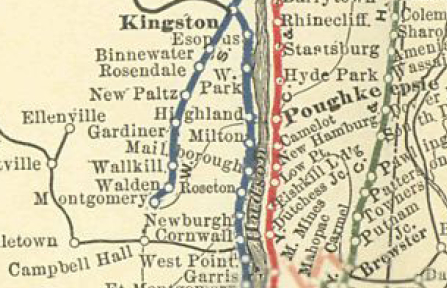
The original Wallkill Valley rail line stretched from Montgomery to Kingston.

By November 1869, the Gardiner rail depot, to the south of New Paltz, was ceremoniously opened by the railroad's president, Floyd McKinstry. The station immediately began to see regular traffic. A second Gardiner station was constructed in the hamlet of Forest Glen, in the northern part of Gardiner. The railroad company was contractually obligated to start construction in New Paltz by May 18, 1870, and work on the New Paltz station commenced that day. The depot was designed to be 20 by 80 feet (6.1 by 24.4 m). The design included freight and baggage rooms, as well as a water tank and engine house. The station had two waiting rooms, while most stations on the Wallkill line only had one. The New Paltz station, as with the other Wallkill Valley stations, was based on "standard patterns ... rather than [being designed] by individual architects".

Half the station's lumber came from Honesdale, Pennsylvania, via the Delaware and Hudson Canal and its framework was raised on July 1, 1870. Work was completed by September 1870. John C. Deyo had provided the carpentry, Snyder and Fuller painted it, and John C. Shaffer was the contractor. Shaffer had also constructed living quarters for the railroad's workers.

The masonry for a bridge over the Plattekill Creek between Gardiner and New Paltz was completed by late June 1870, and trestle work was done by July. Beginning in late September 1870, the railroad had begun laying tracks between Gardiner and New Paltz. The tracks reached the Plattekill Creek bridge by the end of October, and the rail line reached New Paltz on December 1, 1870.

== Opening and early operation ==
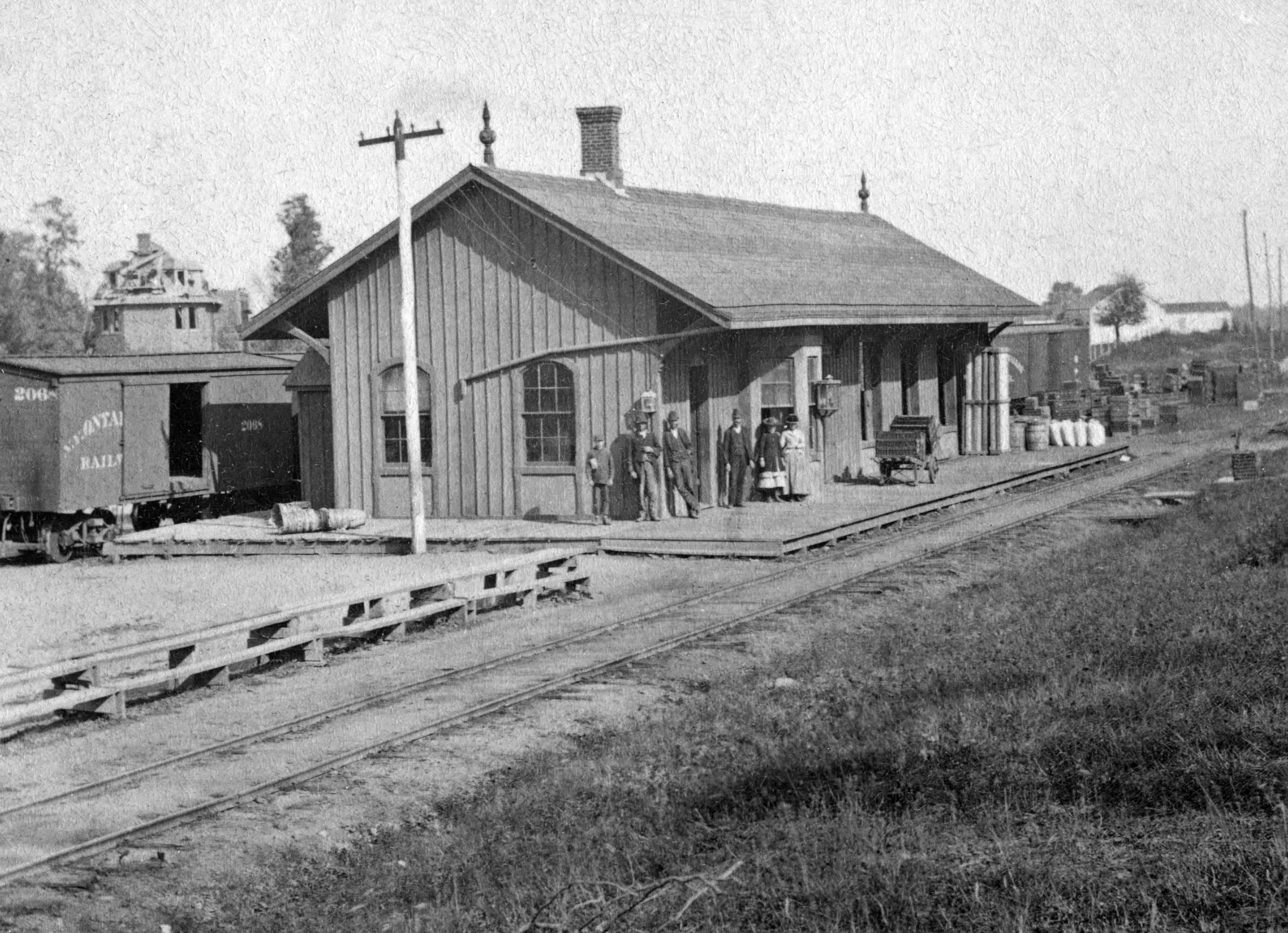
The station as it appeared when it was originally built

The rail line was officially opened in New Paltz on December 20, 1870, during a day-long celebration. At that time, the Wallkill Valley line was connected to the Erie Railroad's Montgomery–Goshen branch to the south; an inaugural train containing about 350 passengers ran to Goshen, making stops at each station along the way, before heading back to New Paltz. The station's telegraph was used to "receive ... election returns" throughout the 1870s.

On March 3, 1880, four men robbed the station's safe. They broke into the depot late at night and dragged the safe to the center of the station. They then attempted to drill holes into the safe and explode it with gunpowder, but failing that, cut off one of its sides. The contents of the safe were 300 cigars and a few bills and papers. After the suspects were arrested in Poughkeepsie, the local sheriff was reluctant to transfer the suspects to New Paltz. The Poughkeepsie police were insistent that they be paid immediately for their services. The day after their arrest, the men were allowed to go to a barber shop for a shave; some witnesses were unable to identify the suspects because of this, and the officers were publicly chided for incompetence. Cigars in the suspects' pockets were identical to the cigars in the safe, and along with tools recovered from the site, they were used to identify the men. The suspects were brought to a jail in Kingston pending the ruling of a grand jury that April. A large crowd gathered at the New Paltz depot to watch them depart. The men were described as "cracksmen of the first water", possibly "stylish", (Note: A witness claimed he saw four strangers matching the suspects' descriptions who were "stylish", but was unable to definitively identify the suspects.) and so proficient at safe-cracking that, "if they [had] any chance at all, or [got] hold of any weapon, they [would] pick their way thro' the jail as easily as boring through a lime heap". The men were subsequently convicted. As a result of the burglary, station agent Dwight Marsh was given a revolver, and it became policy not to keep valuables in the safe overnight. On December 8, 1880, another thief broke a window at the depot and stole a box of cigars.

Two sheds had been built adjacent to the station by 1881. The land the sheds were built on was purchased the previous year by Mohonk Mountain House co-founder Albert Smiley for $500. The sheds were built for the resort's horses. During this period, as many as 14 stagecoaches each day transported guests between the station and Mohonk. The West Shore Railroad purchased the Wallkill Valley line in June 1881, and placed an additional siding by the depot in 1887 to allow daily "special extra-fare trains ... for the Minnewaska and Mohonk visitors".

President Chester A. Arthur visited the station with his daughter in 1884. He was welcomed by the railroad's director and brought to Lake Mohonk. President Rutherford B. Hayes occasionally attended conferences at the Mohonk Mountain House. In 1892, several townspeople held a reception for him at the station, giving him "three rousing cheers". Other notable Mountain House guests who arrived by train were opera singer Ernestine Schumann-Heink and orator William Jennings Bryan. A sewage line was installed from the station to the Wallkill River in 1905.

== Springtown station ==
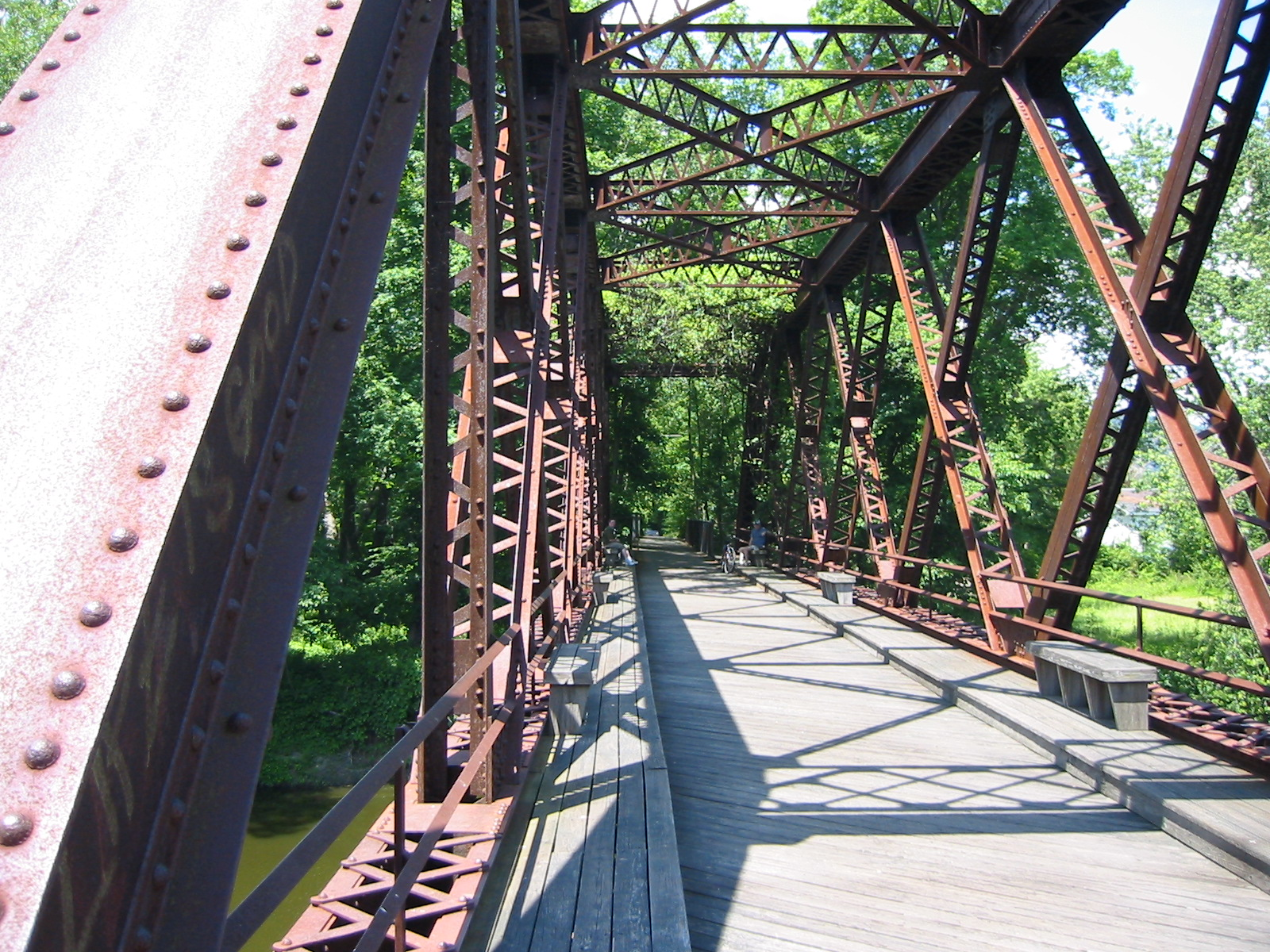
The former railroad bridge that carried the rail line over the Wallkill River to Springtown is now a public walkway.

As soon as the station in the village was completed, a second station was built at Springtown, a hamlet in the northwestern part of the town of New Paltz that once sported "its own post office, church, school, hotel, a gambling den ... and a bevy of bars". The station was planned to be two stories tall with an area of 16 by 40 feet (4.9 by 12.2 m). A 413-foot (126 m) bridge across the Wallkill River to Springtown was completed by December 1870, and the station was constructed at the point where the rail line crossed Coffey Road. Throughout its history, the Springtown station was occupied by various tenants who took up residence.

The original New Paltz station burned down around 4:45 A.M. on April 23, 1907, damaging freight and killing station agent E. J. Snyder's dog. The fire originated in the office stove, and spread rapidly before local fire companies could arrive. A passenger car was used as a temporary station while the building was rebuilt. By late September 1907, the concrete foundation and the framework of the new building had been put in place, but work on the interior did not begin until November because the lumber had not arrived. The depot was completely rebuilt by December 31, 1907, and in active use by February 7, 1908. While the original station had a gabled roof, the rebuilt station was hipped. The direction of the new station's battens was horizontal; the original station had had vertical slats. The rebuilt freight house was placed a distance from the depot.

The building was not fully rebuilt until 1911. A house was constructed at the site of the Springtown depot the year before it was rebuilt. The New York Public Service Commission, a regulatory agency founded in 1907, ruled in May 1911 that the new Springtown station was adequate. The Springtown station had no station agent or freight house. In 1925, sparks shooting off a passing train caused a fire in Springtown that burned down six buildings, causing $7,000 in damage. The prominence of the New Paltz station, as well as the growth of SUNY New Paltz in the village, caused the decline of Springtown as a community.

== Closure ==
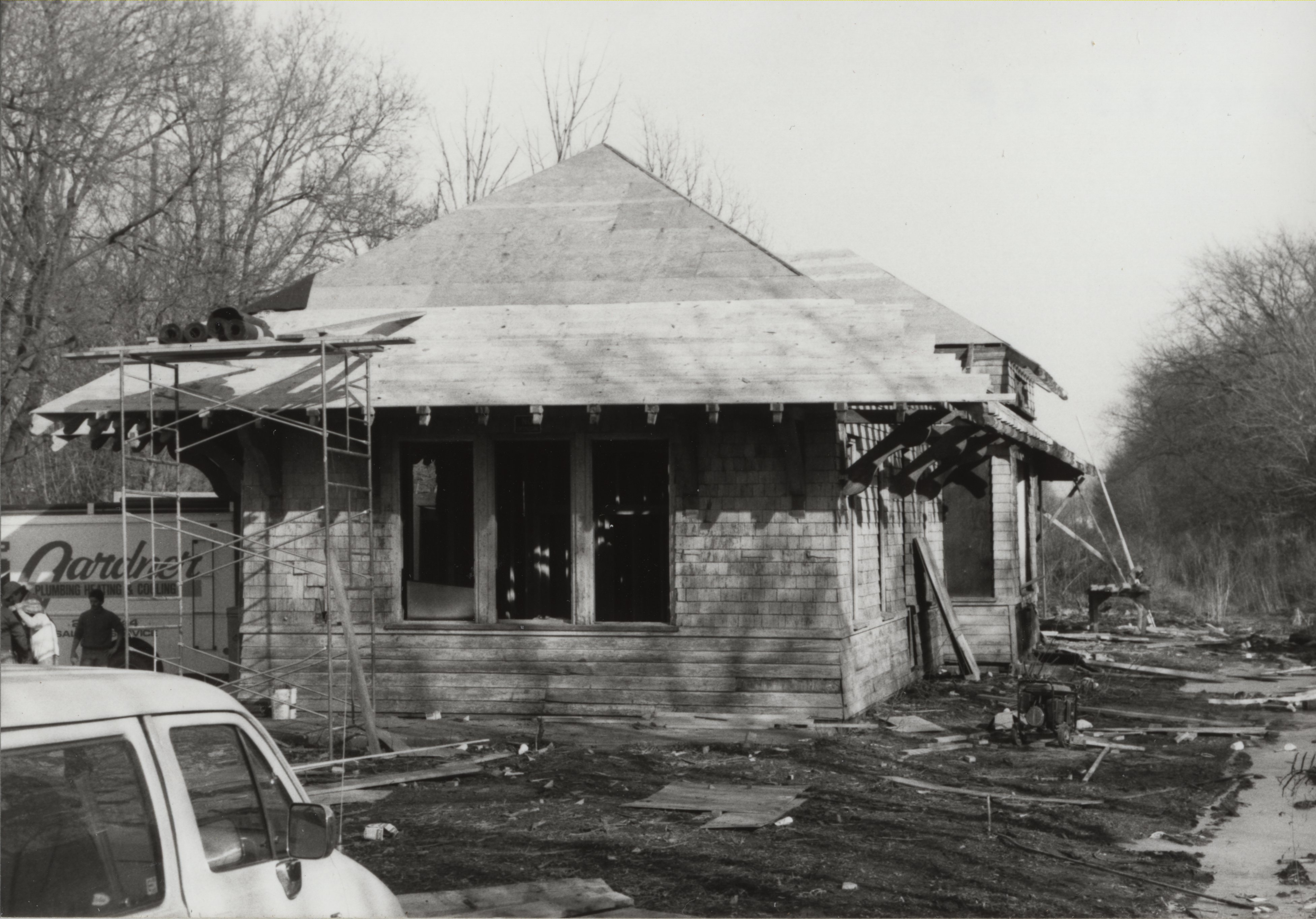
The former station after its closure, being renovated by Robert Mark Realty in 1988

Passenger service along the Wallkill Valley line ceased in 1937, due to the increased usage of automobiles. By December 1958 the building (then owned by the New York Central Railroad) was no longer used as a railroad station. It was sold off in 1959, and hosted a number of local endeavors, serving as a chapter house for the Knights of Columbus and as an office for a public-access television station. Under the ownership of the television station, the roof and floorboards were repaired.

In April 1977, the owner of the property, Fetner and Gold Associates, attempted to open the building as a bar. Their zoning permit was rejected; the village mayor was "unalterably opposed" to the prospect, and the board believed the proposed bar would lead to complaints from nearby apartments. It was also believed that it would be unsafe to open a bar adjacent to an active rail line, and that such a venture would threaten the nearby Huguenot Street Historic District. On December 31, 1977, all regular freight service ceased along the Wallkill Valley line. By the early 1980s the depot had become a "hangout for youths to drink and carouse" and the village considered dismantling it. Conrail, at that time the owner of the rail line, removed all tracks along the corridor between 1983 and 1984 and salvaged the steel.

== Renovation ==
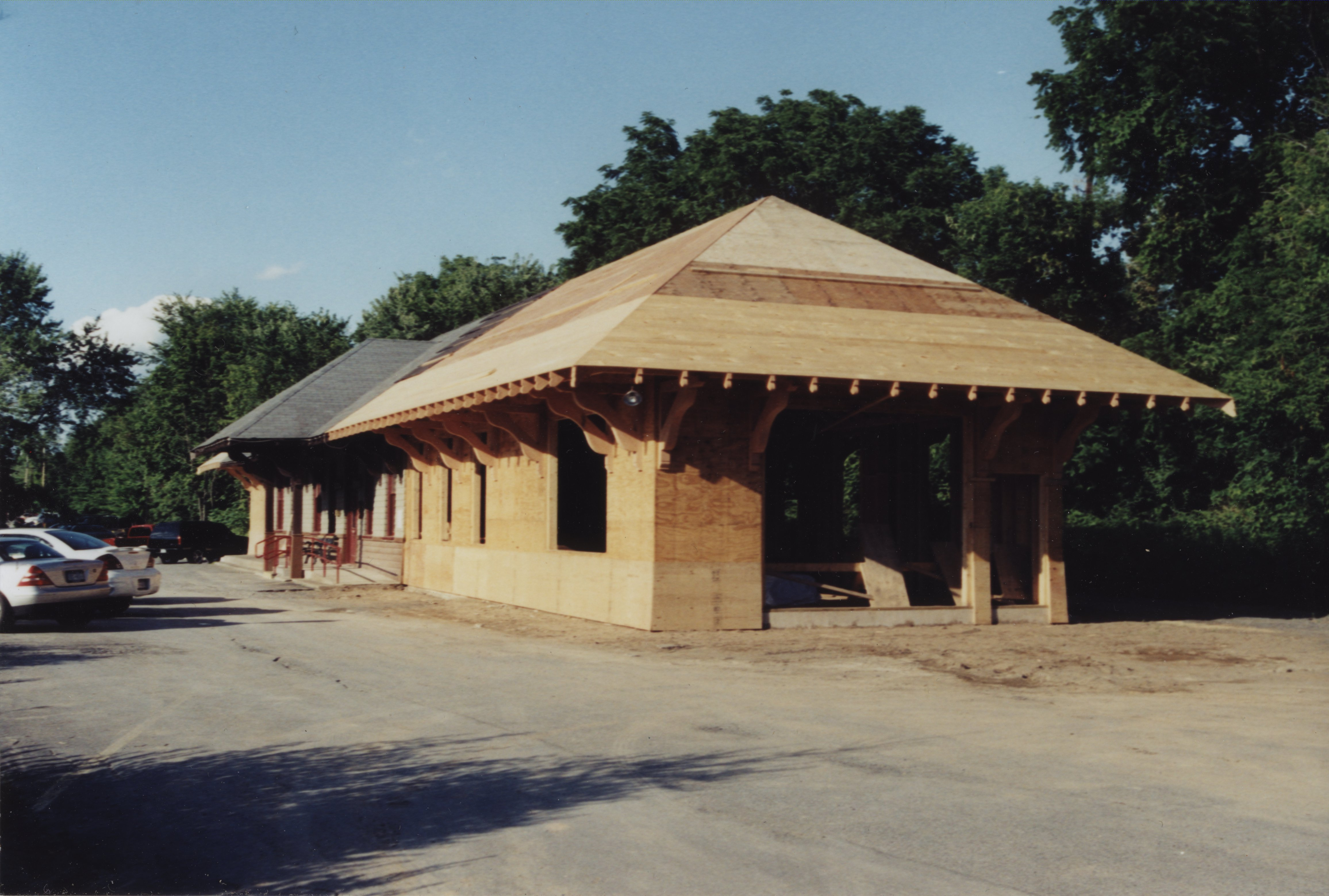
The Station being expanded in 2003

Robert Mark Realty bought the former station in 1986 and renovated it at a cost of $175,000. Work began in October 1987 and was more than halfway done by January 1988. Matt Bialecki, the architect who had overseen the renovation of the former New Paltz opera house as a restaurant, served as the project's architect. Wilro Builders served as the contractor. The building's design follows a shingle style architecture and its sidings are both shingle and clapboard. There are bay windows on the east and west faces, and rafters are partly visible. The building served as a real estate office.

On February 9, 1999, the village approved a plan to allow the building to open as a 36-seat Italian restaurant under the co-ownership of two men, Jeff DiMarco and Rocco Panetta. It was at this time the restaurant was given its former name, La Stazione. DiMarco had previously managed construction for an adjacent restaurant, the Gilded Otter. He sold his ownership of what is now known as The Station in August 2000.

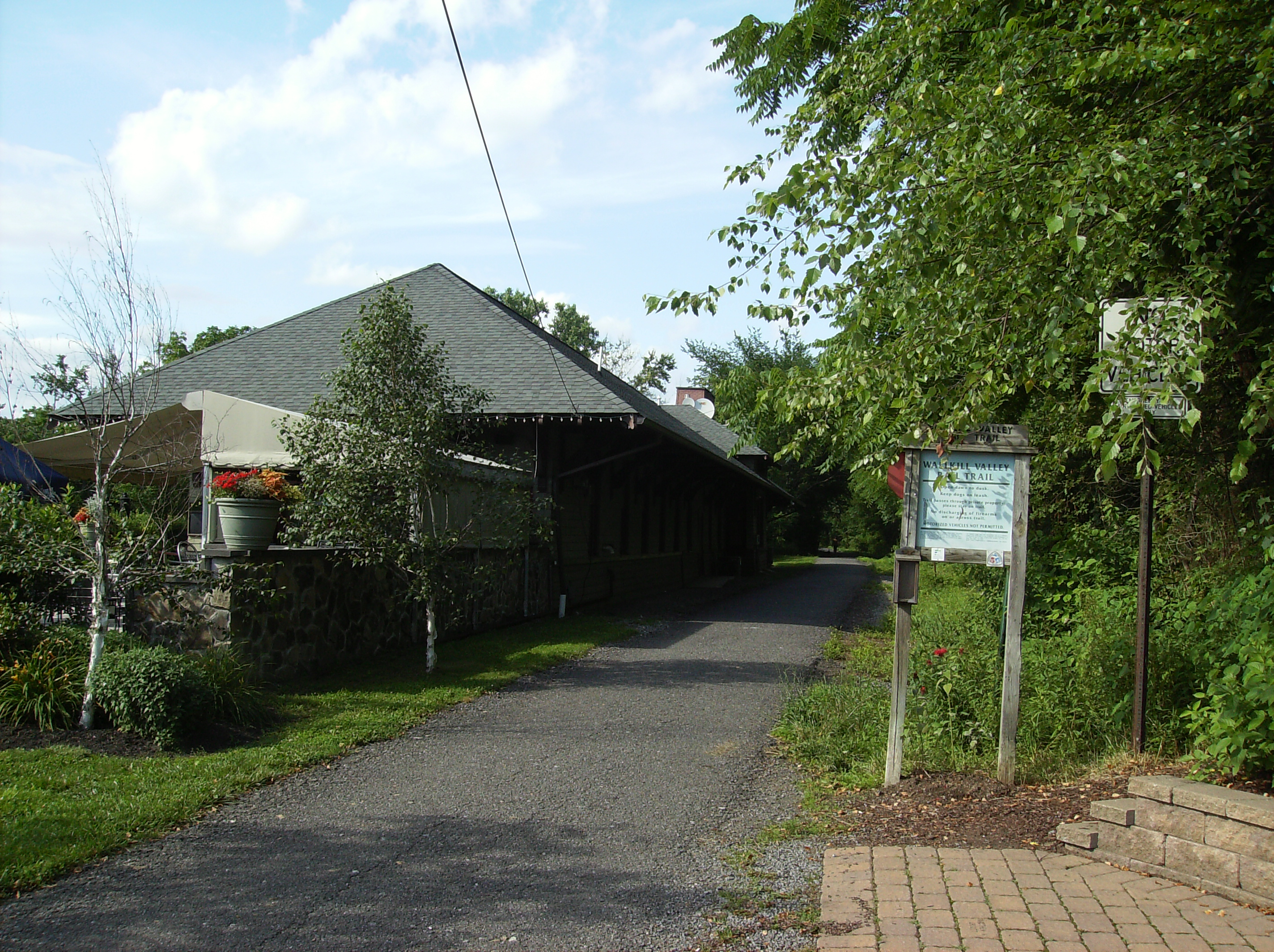
The building as viewed from the Wallkill Valley Rail Trail

The building is adjacent to a rail trail, and there is a 3-foot (0.91 m) bike rack by the building's northern end. The village of New Paltz purchased its section of the former Wallkill Valley rail corridor from Conrail in 1991, formally opening it on October 9, 1993 as a public walkway, the Wallkill Valley Rail Trail. The permit allowing The Station to operate as a restaurant also required the placement of a sign in the building's parking lot to indicate the presence of the trail. The village allowed The Station to place a public picnic table under an overhang by the rail trail, on the condition that the restaurant did not provide outdoor food service. In August 1999, the restaurant was forced to remove a gas tank and gas line that were placed under the trail; failure to do so could have resulted in the revocation of The Station's certificate of occupancy, preventing the building from being operated as a restaurant.

In 2001, the village was experiencing water drainage issues in the area by the restaurant. By early 2002, the village approved plans for an expansion of The Station, which addressed the drainage issues; the restaurant offered to install larger pipes than were necessary in exchange for the village "defray[ing] their costs". When the Gardiner station burned down on October 10, 2002, The Station was left as the last former station of the Wallkill Valley Railroad remaining at its original location. The building's addition was completed in 2003.

A scene from the 2008 mob film Front Man was filmed at The Station; the film's director, Ray Genadry, is the cousin of the restaurant's owner, Rocco Panetta. The scene featured Chris Colombo, son of the late Joseph Colombo, a former boss of the Colombo crime family. Colombo had previously starred in a 2005 mobster documentary on HBO. The building was added to the New Paltz Downtown Historic District on July 24, 2009.

== Former Wallkill Valley stations ==
- Binnewater Historic District
- Campbell Hall (Metro-North station)
- Kingston, New York railroad stations
