= The Locusts =

- U.S. National Register of Historic Places
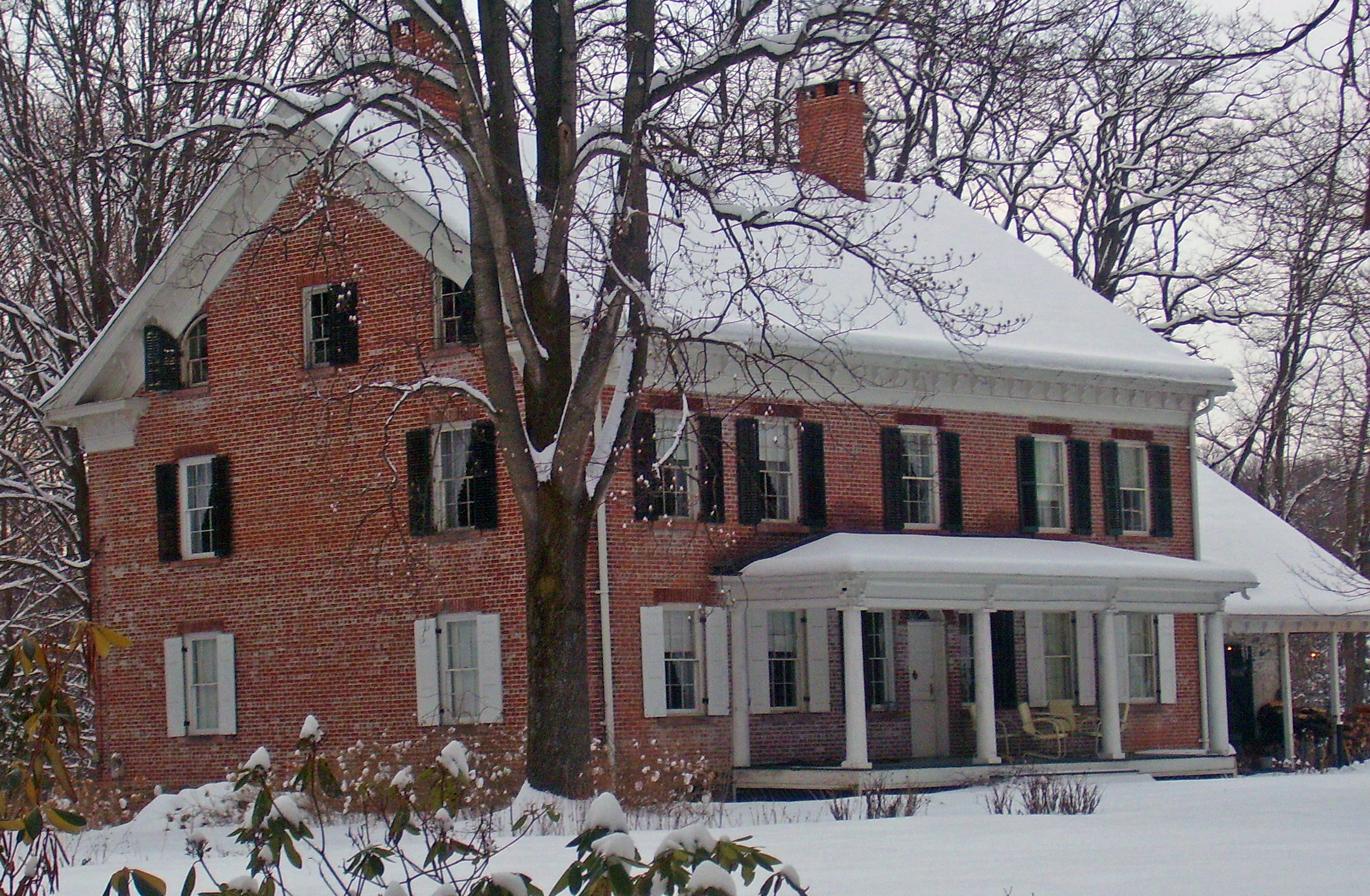
- West elevation and front facade, 2008
- Location: New Paltz, NY
- Nearest city: Poughkeepsie
- Coordinates: 41°43′37″N 74°06′09″W
- Area: 12 acres (49,000 m^{2})
- Built: 1826
- Architectural style: Federal
- NRHP reference No.: 96001440
- Added to NRHP: December 16, 1996

The Locusts, also known as the Peter Eltinge House, is a 19th-century brick Federal style house built in 1826 located on Plains Road in the Town of New Paltz, New York, United States, two miles (3 km) south of the village of New Paltz. It was once the center of a large farm. The house and several outbuildings have been listed on the National Register of Historic Places as well-preserved examples of that style in Ulster County.

When built, it marked a significant departure from the New Paltz area's previous styles, which tended toward stone houses in vernacular styles used by the area's Belgian Huguenot settlers. It has seen many modifications since then, but still remains true to its original concept. The Eltinge family has owned the house continuously as part of its 250-year ownership of the land.

== Building ==
The house is a rectangular, 2 1/2-story structure with five bays. The foundation is built of coursed stone; most of the rest of the house is brick.

A fanlight surmounts the six-panel door at the main entrance in the middle of the first story. The main entrance, fronted by a porch, leads into a central hallway. Another entrance, set in a brick surround, is located in the stone rear facade, offset slightly into the second-westerly of the rear facade's four bays. The windows all have shutters, paneled on the first floor but louvered on the upper stories. Stone was used for the lintels there as well. A bracketed cornice, added later, marks the line of a gabled asphalt-shingled roof.

The front entrance leads to a 12-foot (4 m) wide central hallway, with a finely crafted decorative archway separating the reception area from the staircase. The second floor is similarly laid out. Unusually for the era, none of the rooms have fireplaces. Instead, heating was provided by stoves, many of which remain, with their own chimney outlets. Much of the original flooring, trim and Dutch doors with wrought iron fixtures remains.

== History ==
The land where the house now stands was originally part of a 3,000-acre (12 km^{2}) land grant to Noah Eltinge and Nathaniel LaFever from King George II as a reward for their service in the French and Indian War. The two divided it equally, and Noah added it to a large tract he inherited from his father. He built the first house on it, a stone structure near the site of the present one, in 1748.

He bequeathed it to his daughter and her husband upon his death 30 years later, and in turn it passed to their daughters. In 1806 the slave quarters were built. In 1826 the original house burned down. The new house, the current one, was left to Peter Eltinge and his family. Its brick style was a significant departure from its predecessor and many other since-demolished houses in the area; some of the vernacular elements of the Huguenot-style stone houses found on Huguenot Street in New Paltz and elsewhere remain. The date stone from the original house is located near the front door.

Eltinge's seven children divided the property upon his death in 1842. By this time the original farm was down to 175 acres (0.71 km^{2}). The brackets were added around 1880, along with a well house and horse block. In the early 20th century the Colonial Revival front porch was added.

The farm continued to decline, and by the 1930s 30 Eltinge heirs had a claim to the property. It was bought in 1932 by one of them, Isabella Bush, who installed a furnace, electricity and modern plumbing in it. At the time it was added to the National Register in 1996, one of her descendants, Robert Eltinge Lasher, was still living there with his wife.

== Contributing resources ==
There are four other contributing resources included with the property. Three are extant structures, including two outbuildings, and one is the site of the original stone house.

The small two-by-two-bay 1 1/2-story stone building to the east was built to house slaves in 1806. Edmund Eltinge converted it to tenant farmer housing in 1817. In the mid-19th century a frame addition was built and the Greek Revival cornice with partial returns was also added.

To the north is a small spring house. Wood in the first story, otherwise made of stone, suggests it was constructed in the early 19th century; the frame second story was added at the end of that century. A ca.-1800 horse block is also among the outbuildings.

Robert Lasher also describes a clapboard outhouse he and his siblings knew as the "Lilac House", from the surrounding bushes, from his childhood visits in the 1920s. It is no longer extant, although the bushes remain.

The original house site is visible as a small depression in the lawn to the immediate south of the current house. While a number of artifacts have been recovered from this site, there have been no formal archaeological excavations. It is believed that such investigations, if undertaken, could yield considerable information about the first 80 years of the property's history.
