= Elting Memorial Library =

- U.S. National Register of Historic Places
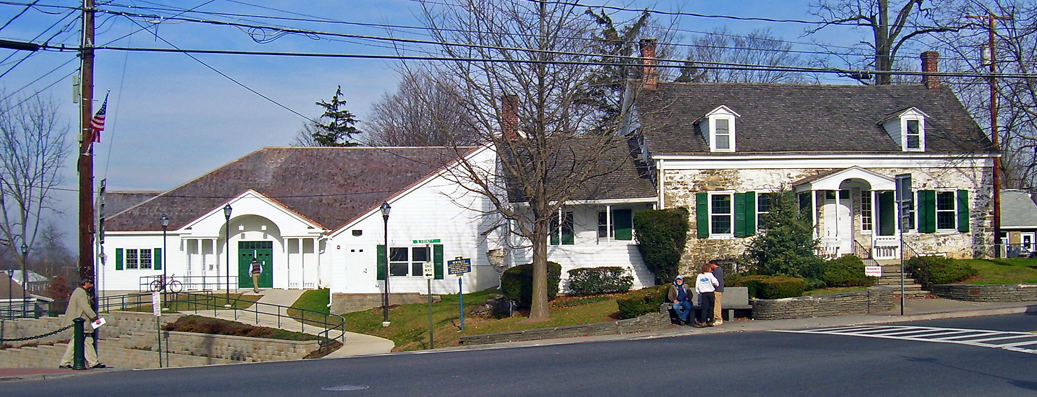
- The Elting Library seen from across Main Street. The older portion of the library is to the right; the newer wing and main entrance are on the left.
- Location: New Paltz, NY
- Nearest city: Kingston
- Coordinates: 41°44′54″N 74°05′05″W
- Area: 9.9 acres (4.0 ha)
- Built: circa 1750 through 2006
- Architect: Solomon Eltinge
- Architectural style: Federal Style, Colonial
- NRHP reference No.: 04000432
- Added to NRHP: May 12, 2004

Elting Memorial Library is the public library that serves the residents of the village and town of New Paltz, New York. It is located at 93 Main Street, at the corner of NY 32 and 299) in the village's downtown area. In addition to a collection typical of most college town libraries, Elting Memorial Library houses the Haviland-Heidgerd Historical Collection, a non-circulating genealogical and historical research collection with a focus on the history of the town and village of New Paltz. This collection features "house books" that detail the history of local homes and buildings, including historic structures. The library gained notoriety in 2007 for a videotaped ghost visit that became the most popular online video about New Paltz.

== History ==
Originally called the New Paltz Free Library, the library was founded by the New Paltz Study Club in 1909, and outgrew its space on lower Main Street by 1919. Native son and summer resident Philip Lefevre Elting purchased the "Old Elting Homestead" for library use in 1920.

The old stone house was for many years called the Solomon Eltinge Homestead, and though Solomon did purchase and live in the home, it was built by Thomas Owens. One of the earliest buildings on Main Street, it was erected around the same time as the Village of New Paltz was incorporated, and its location made it convenient for it to become a library in 1920.

The original building, considered the "final gasp of stone house architecture" in the area, had new wings added on in 1962 and 1978, and was expanded again in 2006 (during which the bulk of the library's collection was relocated to temporary storage facilities). This expansion cost approximately $2.5 million, and much of the library's collection and its main circulation desk are housed in this most recent addition. It has been on the National Register of Historic Places since 2004. It is located within the New Paltz Downtown Historic District.

== Services and structure ==
As of 2019, the library serves some 14,000 area residents, circulating approximately 101,000 items a year. A member of the Mid-Hudson Library System, it also offers a range of programming including speakers, story times, reading nights, free movies and area employment and tourism information. The library is also a key member of the One Book, One New Paltz program. Beginning in 2010, the Elting library began receiving the bulk of its funding through a substantial increase from the town of New Paltz taxes as a result of referendum on the issue.

=== The Haviland Heidgerd Historical Collection ===
The library's historic collection houses a significant collection of materials relevant to the local area. According to the library's own web site, "It is considered to be one of the best local history collections in the Hudson Valley and is home to a wealth of primary, one-of-a-kind, local history documents. Residents, descendants of New Paltz’s founding families, visitors, scholars, and students use the collection’s resources to research area history and trace family and genealogical roots." The collection includes over 10,000 newspapers, photographs, periodicals, and yearbooks that date back as far as 1860.

=== Governance ===
Elting Memorial Library is an association library. The library is governed by a board of directors which includes four officers and eight additional members. The board oversees a library director and staff.

As of May 2024, the president of the board is Richard Heyl de Ortiz and the library director is Crystal Middleton.

== See also ==
- Mid-Hudson Library System
