= Mike Ricci (racing driver) =

American racing driver (born 1964)

- Nationality: American
- Born: December 13, 1964 (age 61) New Paltz (town), New York
- Retired: 2022
- Debut season: 1979

Modified racing career
- Car number: 17, 76, 406
- Championships: 8
- Wins: 144

Mike Ricci Jr. (born December 13, 1964) is a retired American dirt modified stock car driver.

== Racing career ==
Mike Ricci began racing in 1979 at age 14. Before reaching his 18th birthday, he had claimed 11 wins and the first of 4 track championships at Accord Speedway, New York.

The next year, Ricci attended his high school graduation ceremony and that same evening scored his first win at Orange County Fair Speedway in Middletown, New York, en route to a career that garnered victories at 11 different tracks. Ricci won the Super Dirt Week 358-modified event in 1993 at the Syracuse Fairgrounds, New York.

Before retiring Ricci claimed four track championships at Accord, three at Mok-A-Tek Speedway in Lakeville, Pennsylvania, and another crown at Devil's Bowl Speedway in West Haven, Vermont.

== Personal life ==
Ricci comes from a racing family. He competed against his brother Rich Jr., niece Allison Ricci, and nephews Rich III and Jimmy Wells. His father, Rich Ricci Sr. began driving race cars in the early years of the sport before stepping. back to the crew chief role for his children and grandchildren.
