= New Paltz (village), New York =

New Paltz, New York
- Village
- Village of New Paltz
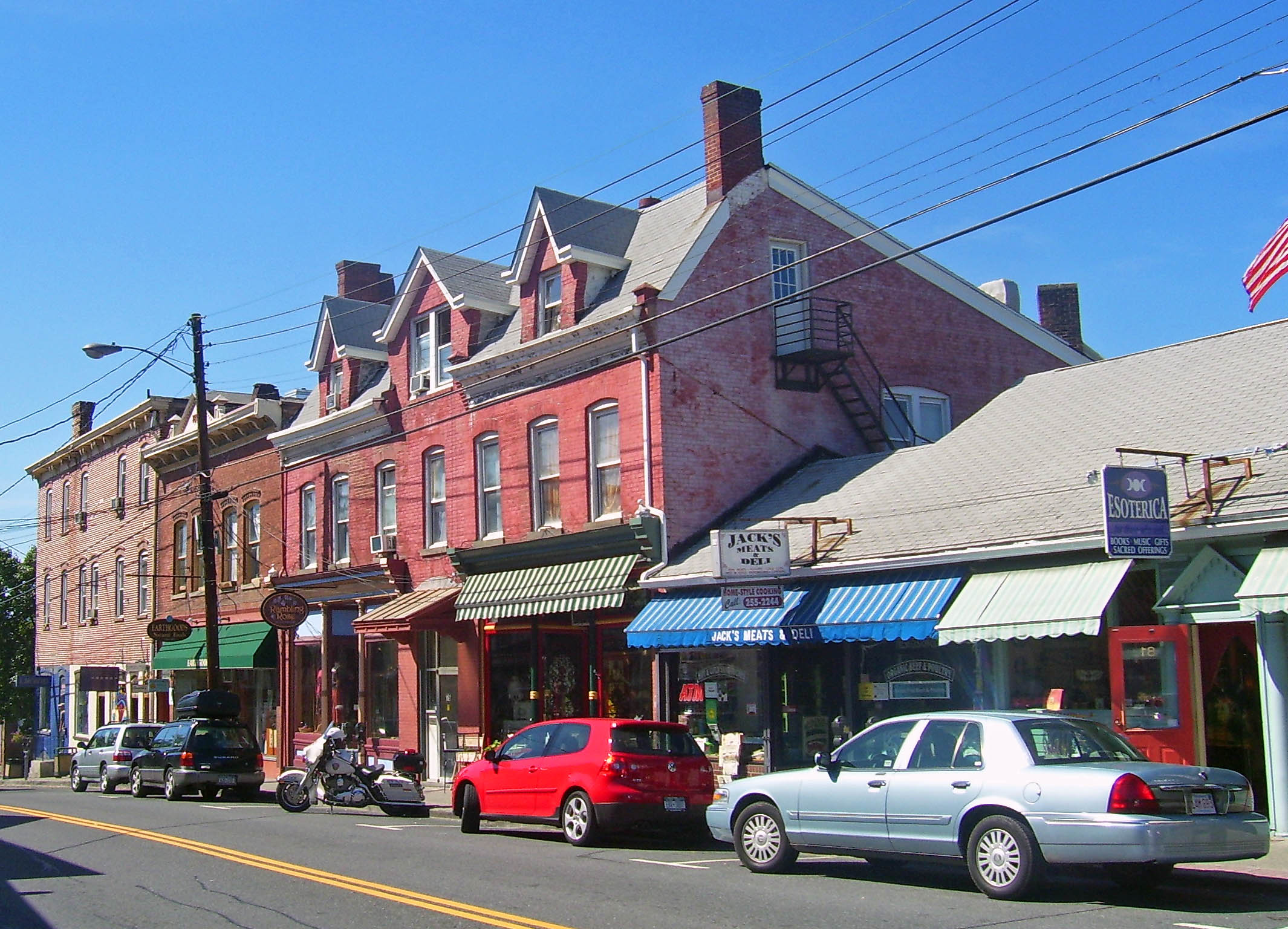
- Buildings on downtown Main Street

- Flag Seal
- Etymology: from Palatine German pronunciation of Pfalz
- Location in Ulster County and the State of New York.

- Location of New York State in the United States
- Coordinates: 41°45′N 74°5′W
- Country: United States
- State: New York
- County: Ulster
- Founded: 1887

Government
  - Type: Village
  - Body: Board of trustees
  - Mayor: Alexandria Wojcik

Area
  - Total: 1.80 sq mi (4.66 km^{2})
  - Land: 1.76 sq mi (4.56 km^{2})
  - Water: 0.039 sq mi (0.10 km^{2})
- Highest elevation (S village line near SE corner): 360 ft (110 m)
- Lowest elevation (Wallkill River at E village corner): 160 ft (49 m)

Population (2020)
  - Total: 7,324
  - Density: 4,157.2/sq mi (1,605.12/km^{2})
- Time zone: UTC-5 (EST)
  - Summer (DST): UTC-4 (EDT)
- ZIP Code(s): 12561
- Area code: 845
- FIPS code: 36-50551
- GNIS feature ID: 0958443
- Wikimedia Commons: New Paltz, New York
- Website: village of New Paltz

New Paltz is a village in Ulster County located in the U.S. state of New York. It is approximately 80 miles (130 km) north of New York City and 70 miles (110 km) south of Albany. The population was 7,324 at the 2020 census.

New Paltz is located within the town of New Paltz, and is home to the State University of New York at New Paltz, founded in 1828. The town is served by exit 18 on the New York State Thruway, as well as state routes 299, 32, and 208; it is also about 90 minutes from both New York City and Albany.

== History ==
The Elting Memorial Library, Guilford-Bower Farm House, Jean Hasbrouck House, Major Jacob Hasbrouck Jr. House, Huguenot Street Historic District, Lake Mohonk Mountain House Complex, New Paltz Downtown Historic District, and The Locusts are listed on the National Register of Historic Places.

=== Early development ===
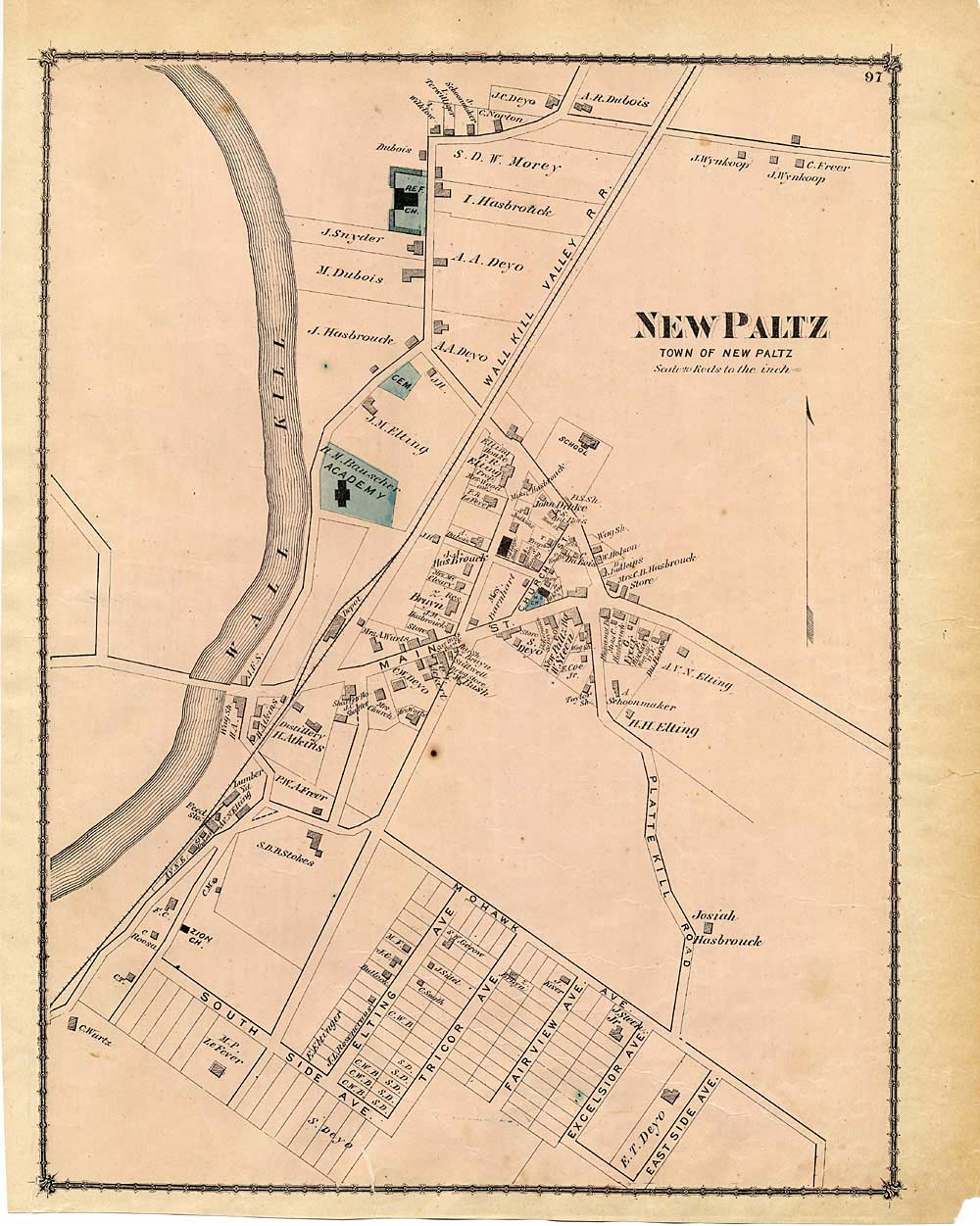
An 1875 map of the town of New Paltz; the village was created in the central portion

New Paltz was founded in 1678 by French Huguenots settlers, including Louis DuBois, who had taken refuge in Mannheim, Germany, for a brief period of time, being married there in 1655, before emigrating to the Dutch colony of New Netherland in 1660 with his family. Mannheim was a major town of the Palatinate (in German, the Pfalz), at the time a center of Protestantism. The settlers lived in Wiltwyck (present day Kingston, New York) and in 1677 purchased a patent for the land surrounding present day New Paltz from a Lenape tribe known as the Esopus.

The people of Mannheim use a dialect form of the name Pfalz without the "f", pronouncing it "Paltz." Records of the New Paltz Reformed Church, which was formed in 1683, show the name of the settlement was first expressed not in German, nor in English, but in French: Nouveau Palatinat. The community was governed by a kind of corporation called the Duzine, referring to the 12 partners who acquired the royal patent. That form of government continued well past the time of the American Revolution, by special action of the New York State legislature.

The 40,000 acres (16,000 ha) or so of the patent, stretching to the Hudson River and augmented soon by the other patents on the south, were eventually divided among those twelve partners, their relatives, and a few friends into large plots – part wilderness and part farm. The farms were grouped principally around the heights west and east of the Wallkill River. The commercial center serving the agricultural base was located on the east shore of the Wallkill River, in the area where the first settlers had built their shelters. The street is now known as Huguenot Street.

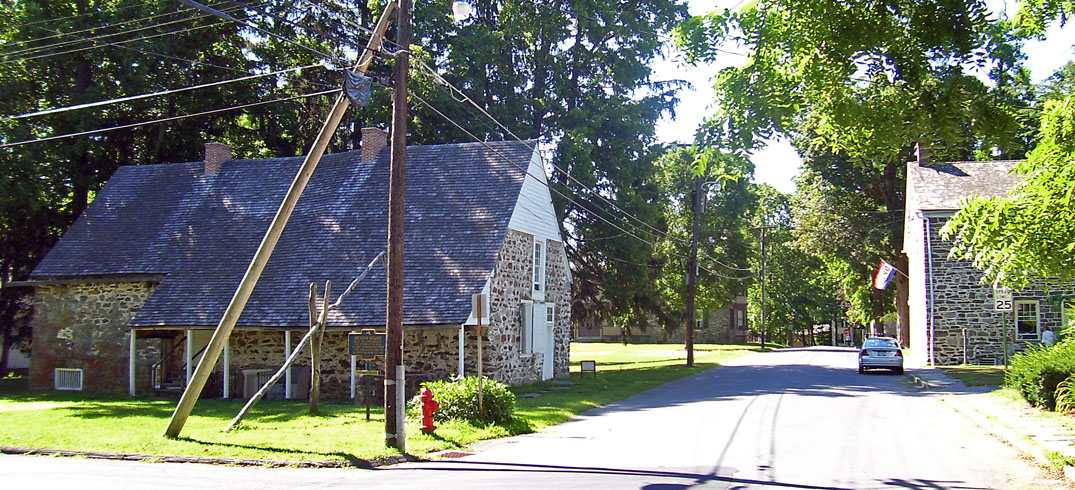
Stone houses of Historic Huguenot Street in New Paltz. They are among the surviving examples of early stone houses built by Europeans in North America.

There, the church, schools, blacksmith, seamstresses, and stores flourished for the benefit of farmers who required goods such as seed, tools, clothing, and food not available on all farms, including alcoholic beverages. The church, which was also used as a school, was located here. Many of the buildings still stand today, as a living museum community.

Population slowly spread from the Wallkill up along the street now known as North Front Street and then along what is now Chestnut Street. In the 19th century, development continued along what is now Main Street. The secession of the town of Lloyd and parts of Shawangunk, Esopus, and Gardiner, between 1843 and 1853, reduced New Paltz to its present size. In 1887, the village of New Paltz was incorporated within the eponymous town.

Higher education has been one of the main concerns of the community since the 1830s, with facilities on Huguenot and North Front streets. Late in the nineteenth century, the college was built in the area of Plattekill Avenue and Manheim Boulevard, where the State University of New York at New Paltz now stands.

The Wallkill Valley Railroad reached New Paltz by 1870, and provided passenger service through the town until 1937. After the rail line's closure in 1977, the section of the corridor running through New Paltz was converted to the Wallkill Valley Rail Trail, and the former train station in New Paltz was renovated as a restaurant, the Station.

== Geography ==
According to the United States Census Bureau, the village has a total area of 1.8 square miles (4.7 km^{2}), of which 1.7 square miles (4.4 km^{2}) is land and 0.04 square miles (0.10 km^{2}) (1.70%) is water.

The Wallkill River runs north along the western border of New Paltz, flowing into the Rondout Creek and eventually the Hudson River.

== Demographics ==
Historical population
Census	Pop.	Note	%±
1870	425		—
1880	493		16.0%
1890	935		89.7%
1900	1,022		9.3%
1910	1,230		20.4%
1920	1,056		−14.1%
1930	1,362		29.0%
1940	1,492		9.5%
1950	2,285		53.2%
1960	3,041		33.1%
1970	6,058		99.2%
1980	4,938		−18.5%
1990	5,463		10.6%
2000	6,034		10.5%
2010	6,818		13.0%
2020	7,324		7.4%
U.S. Decennial Census 2020

As of the census of 2000, there were 6,034 people, 1898 households, and 586 families residing in the village. The population density was 3,482.5 people per square mile (1,344.6 people/km^{2}). There were 1,957 housing units at an average density of 1,129.5 per square mile (436.1/km^{2}). The racial makeup of the village was 73.42% white, 7.79% black or African American, 0.27% Native American, 7.01% Asian, 0.10% Pacific Islander, 8.35% from other races, and 3.07% from two or more races. Hispanic or Latino of any race were 11.93% of the population.

There were 1,898 households, out of which 12.9% had children under the age of 18 living with them, 21.1% were married couples living together, 7.3% had a female householder with no husband present, and 69.1% were non-families. 41.1% of all households were made up of individuals, and 7.2% had someone living alone who was 65 years of age or older. The average household size was 2.03 and the average family size was 2.66.

In the village, the age of population was disbursed as such: 6.9% under the age of 18, 58.7% from 18 to 24, 19.0% from 25 to 44, 10.1% from 45 to 64, and 5.3% who were 65 years of age or older. The median age was 22 years. For every 100 females, there were 80.8 males. For every 100 females age 18 and over, there were 78.8 males.

The median income for a household in the village was $21,747, and the median income for a family was $51,186. Males had a median income of $33,103 versus $22,935 for females. The per capita income for the village was $11,644. About 11.8% of families and 36.9% of the population were below the poverty line, including 18.6% of those under age 18 and 12.2% of those age 65 or over.

== Politics ==
The mayor is Alexandria Wojcik, who assumed the role in an acting capacity on January 1, 2026, after former mayor Tim Rogers was elected as the supervisor of the town of New Paltz. She was formally appointed by the board on February 18, 2026, making her the first openly LGBTQ mayor of New Paltz and the first woman to hold the office since 1983. Wojcik is a member of the New York Forward Party, making her the second third-party Mayor in the Village's history.

The board of trustees meets on the second and fourth Wednesdays of the month at 7:00 p.m. at the village hall. Sewer and water districts for the village are maintained through a department of public works. Rehabilitation of the sewer system, which has been found to overflow raw sewage onto local streets and into the Wallkill, is expected under a consent order agreed to in 2003.

=== Activism ===
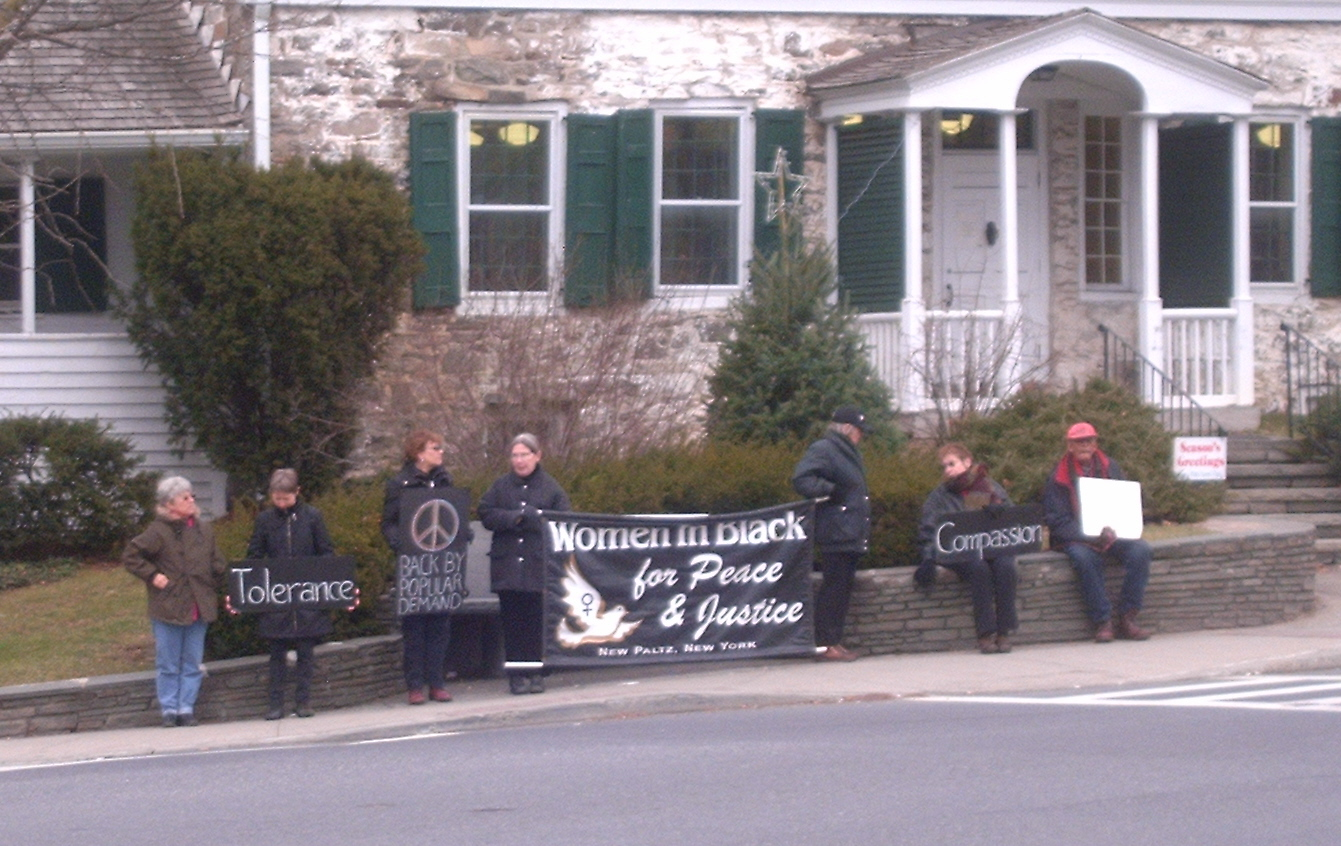
Women in Black staging a protest in front of Elting Memorial Library

The Women in Black have a small-but-active chapter in New Paltz that has been protesting in front of Elting Memorial Library weekly since November 2001. In 2024, over 200 activists rallied at the library to demonstrate their "outrage" over the arrest of over 100 students at SUNY New Paltz who had created a Gaza solidarity encampment.

=== Electoral history ===
Village mayoral elections are held every four years, with the mayor serving a four-year term. Prior to 2015, elections were traditionally nonpartisan, with candidates sometimes running on informal or locally created party lines rather than major-party ballots.

Thomas Nyquist was elected mayor in 1987 and served four consecutive four-year terms, before being defeated in 2003 after sixteen years in office, one of the longest mayoral tenures in the village's history.

In 2003, 26-year-old political activist Jason West won the mayoral election in a three-way race, taking office alongside two other candidates associated with the Green Party (Rebecca Rotzler and Julia Walsh). West gained international attention as part of the first Green Party majority elected in New York State, and later for risking criminal prosecution to marry 25 same-sex couples. He lost his reelection bid on May 1, 2007, to village trustee Terry Dungan.

Dungan did not seek reelection in 2011, announcing he would instead focus on recovering from a stroke he had suffered on Christmas Day. West returned to the race that year, running on the "Cooperative Party" ticket, and won a second non-consecutive term. West scored 381 votes in that contest.

In 2015, Tim Rogers won the mayoral race with 353 votes, defeating incumbent Jason West (204 votes), village trustee Sally Rhoads (177 votes), and Amy Cohen (137 votes) — a four-way race that drew roughly 870 total ballots. Rogers ran unopposed in 2019, receiving 364 votes, and again ran unopposed in 2023, backed by both the Democratic and Working Families parties.

Rogers vacated the mayoralty when he won election as Town Supervisor in November 2025, defeating incumbent Amanda Gotto with 75.95% of the vote. Deputy Mayor Alexandria Wojcik became acting mayor as Rogers assumed his new role and was formally appointed by the board on February 18, 2026. Wojcik had originally been elected to the village board as a trustee after running on a self-styled "D.I.Y. — Do It Yourself" party line with a $0 campaign in 2019. On November 3, 2026, Wojcik was elected to position with over 90% of the vote running unopposed.

On November 3, 2026, residents in both the Town and Village of New Paltz voted against consolidation, with Town residents voting 64/35% against and Village residents voting 59/40%

Members of the board of trustees
Name	Position	Took office	Left office	Political affiliation
Alexandria Wojcik	Mayor	January 1, 2026	Incumbent	Forward
Stevie Susta	Deputy mayor	2023	Incumbent	Democrat
Rich Souto	Trustee	January 1, 2026	Incumbent	Democrat
Allen Ross	Trustee	January 1, 2026	Incumbent	Democrat
Jasmine Towers	Trustee	March 4, 2026	Incumbent	Democrat

=== Party affiliation ===
Party	Mayors
Independent/local	14^{[a]}
Democratic	5*
Green	1^{[b]}
Forward	1

== Media ==
=== Newspapers ===
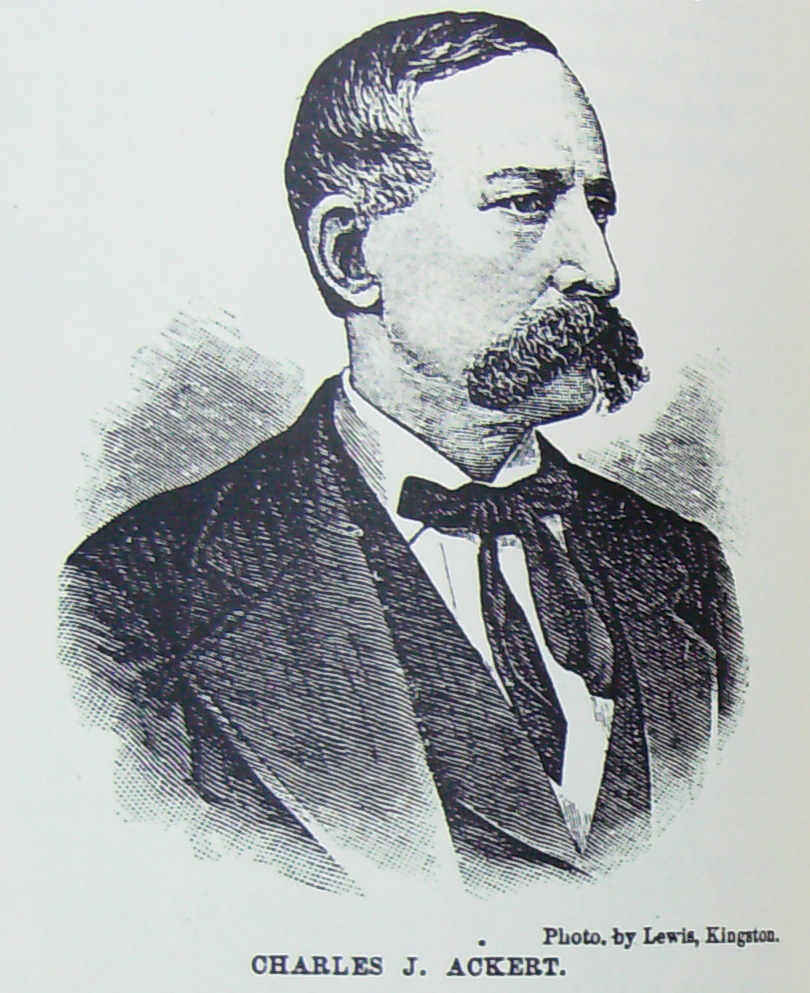
Charles J. Ackert, the first newspaper publisher in New Paltz

The first local newspaper in New Paltz, the New Paltz Times, was founded by Charles J. Ackert, who printed its first issue on July 6, 1860. It was a weekly paper in which the Democratic Party was supported. The New Paltz Independent, a Republican newspaper, was founded in 1868. Both the Times and Independent merged in 1919, becoming the New Paltz Independent and Times that ran until 1972, when it became the Old Dutch New Paltz Independent and Times. That same year it was renamed the Old Dutch independent, and ran until it was discontinued in 1975. The New Paltz News was founded in 1935, and merged with the Wallkill paper Wallkill Valley World in 1980. The Huguenot Herald was first published in 1976 and merged in 1985 with the Highland paper, the Highland Herald. At SUNY New Paltz, a college newspaper, the New Paltz Oracle, was founded in 1938. The Huguenot Herald and New Paltz News continued to run until they were merged by the owner of Ulster Publishing as the New Paltz Times in 2001. The modern New Paltz Times, which had no continuity with the 19th-century paper of the same name, was published weekly until 2020, when it was merged into Hudson Valley One.

== Culture ==
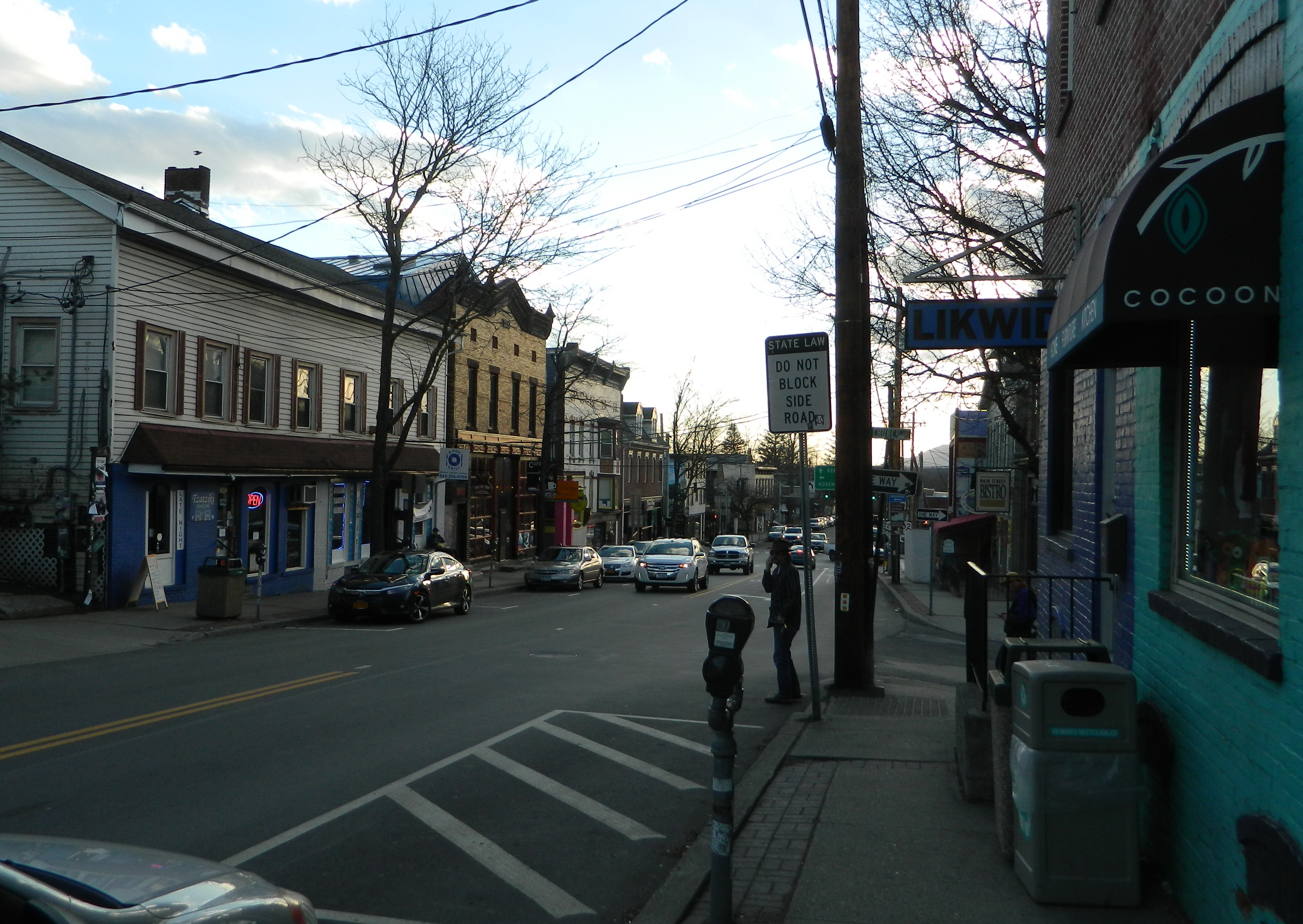
Lower Main Street, New Paltz

New Paltz hosts a number of cultural events.

=== Unity in Diversity Day ===
This event, paid for through the village, town, and SUNY New Paltz, celebrated the differences among people through food, spoken word poetry, artistic endeavors and theatrical performance. The last known theme, in 2007, was derived from Dr. Seuss's story about Sneetches.

=== Halloween ===
Haunted Hasbrouck Park

For over a quarter of a century the Guenther family put on a free haunted house for area residents, which attracted thousands of visitors on Halloween night. After complaints about traffic and noise concerns, owners Ann and Dan Guenther announced in 2006 that they would no longer create the attraction. However, interest continued, and the attraction was relocated to Hasbrouck Park in 2007, utilizing the park's castle playground as a centerpiece. This move also increased community involvement for the event for the two years it was held there, drawing upon the local YMCA, village employees, and volunteers from the area.

Halloween parade

A parade on Halloween night has been conducted through the village since the 1960s. It begins at the New Paltz middle school and ends at Historic Huguenot Street.

Haunted Huguenot Street

On the nights leading up to Halloween, stories of spirits, tragedy, misfortune and the paranormal fill the 330-year-old street under the moniker of "Haunted Huguenot Street" tours.

Night of 100 Pumpkins

Since 1990 this pumpkin-carving contest has been hosted at a local eatery called the Bakery.

=== Pride march ===
A pride march celebrating LGBT culture is a focus of pride celebrations in June, drawing a number of out-of-town visitors to see the community where same-sex weddings were performed when they were still illegal.

=== Memorial Day parade ===
The local Memorial Day parade is always held on the actual Memorial Day, not the Monday substitute agreed upon in Congress.

=== Turkey Trot ===
A fundraising run on Thanksgiving to support Family of New Paltz.

=== New Paltz Regatta ===
A river race using home made boats that was started in 1955 by Delta Kappa fraternity at SUNY New Paltz. It has since been taken over by local citizens and is held every year to celebrate the start of summer.

=== New Paltz in fiction ===
- New Paltz was the place in which the character Penny Johnson (Cynthia Rhodes) got an abortion in the 1987 movie Dirty Dancing, which was set in the early 1960s.
- It was also the village visited by Miss Sara Howard during the investigation of a sadistic killer's origins, in the novel The Alienist by Caleb Carr.
- The town is mentioned in Paul Simon's song "Killer Wants to Go to College" on his album Songs from The Capeman.
- New Paltz was fictionalized as "Little Heart" in the 2013 novel The Cusp of Sad by Nikki Pison about the 1980s punk rock street and music scene.

== Recreation ==
=== Biking and hiking ===
The Mohonk Preserve, Mohonk Mountain House and Minnewaska State Park offer biking and hiking opportunities in an area deemed picturesque by tourism supporters.

The Wallkill Valley Rail Trail passes through New Paltz and runs concurrently with the Empire State Trail for a distance.

The River-to-Ridge trail runs from the village line into the Mohonk Preserve.

== Transportation ==
=== Automobile ===
New Paltz is exit 18 on the New York State Thruway, which is also designated as Interstate 87.

=== Bus ===
There is frequent bus service between The Port Authority Bus Terminal in New York City and New Paltz provided by Trailways of New York, with connections to many other villages and cities in New York State. Express bus service is also available from New Paltz to New York City via Trailways of New York, serving the park-ride lot at Exit 18 of the Thruway. Ulster County Area Transit also provides service to Metro-North Railroad in Poughkeepsie, along with local bus service to Kingston, Newburgh, and points in between along Route 32. In January 2009 the New Paltz Loop Bus, stopping at points throughout the community, was launched.

=== Air ===
Stewart International Airport is the nearest major airport to New Paltz. It is located in Newburgh, thirty minutes to the south.

=== Rail ===
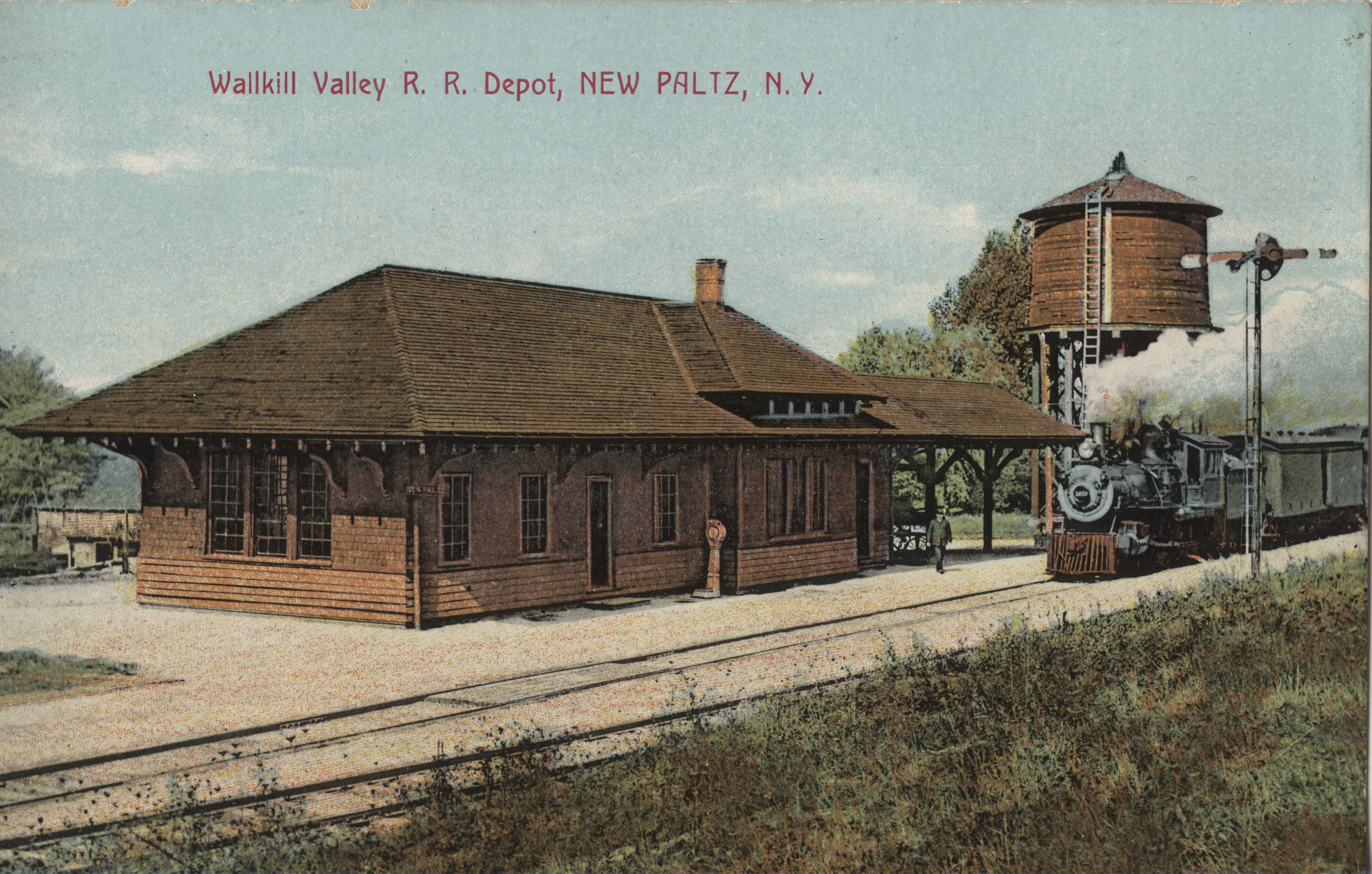
The former New York Central station

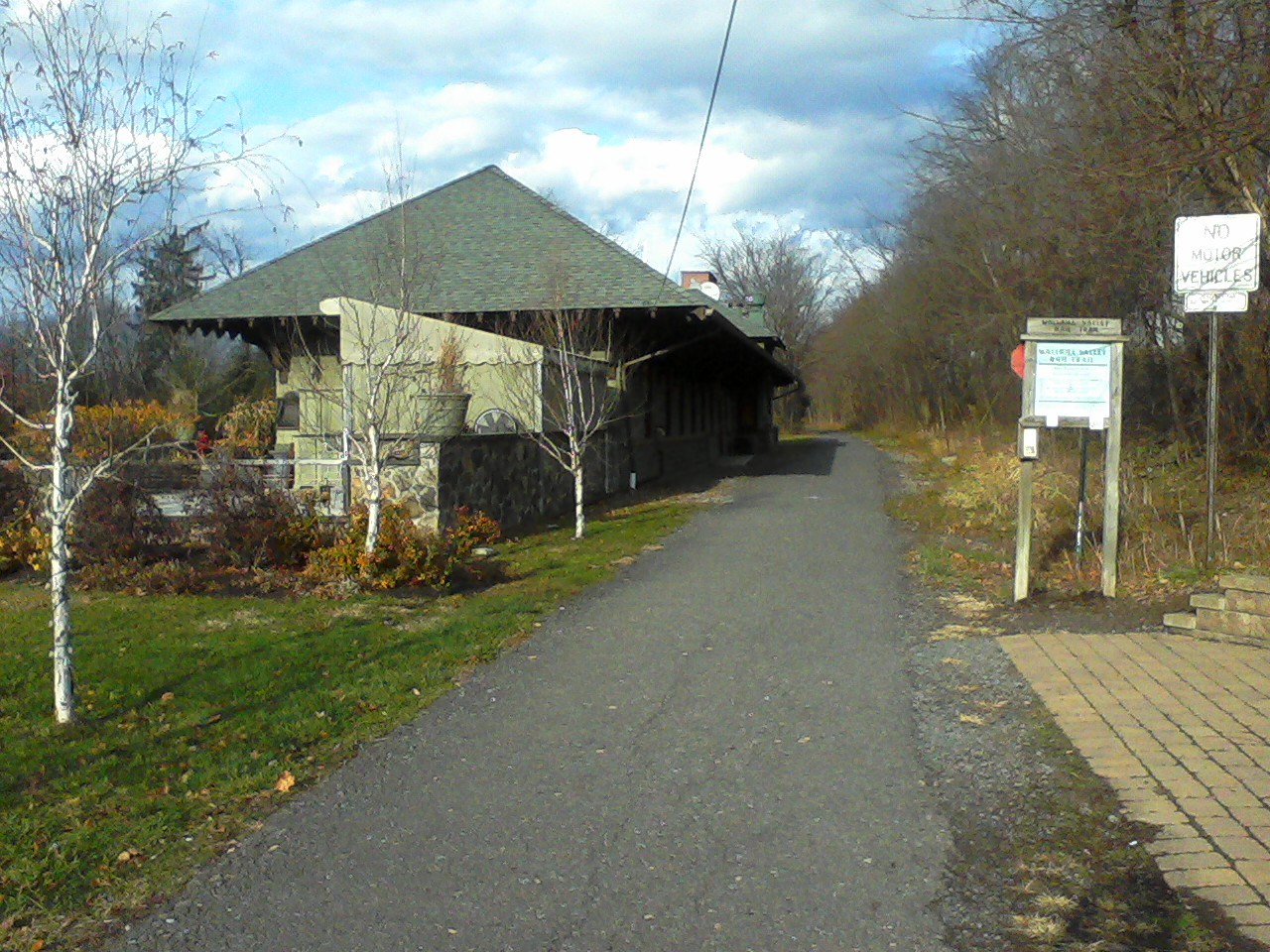
The former station, La Stazione, as viewed from the Wallkill Valley Rail Trail

The Wallkill Valley Railroad, founded in 1866, stretched from Montgomery to Kingston. The New Paltz railroad station was originally built in 1870, rebuilt after a 1907 fire. The railroad and station later came under New York Central ownership. The NYC operated two trains a day, each direction, on a Kingston-New Paltz-Montgomery run. At Kingston, connections were available trains north to Albany and south to Weehawken, New Jersey. The passenger service through New Paltz ended in 1937, and the rail division was abandoned by Conrail in 1983. The former roadbed was converted for use as the Wallkill Valley Rail Trail.

The former station (now called La Stazione) was sold to private interests in 1959. The building was in a state of disrepair by the early 1980s, but renovated in 1988 and converted to an Italian restaurant in 1999.

The nearest active railroad station is the Poughkeepsie Metro-North station, which is served by several Amtrak trains and is the terminus for the Metro-North Railroad's Hudson Line. The Hudson Line stretches from Poughkeepsie to Grand Central Terminal in New York City. Poughkeepsie is a 15-20 minute drive east of New Paltz.

=== Transportation plan ===
In 2006, the town and village officials agreed to pay for a transportation study to analyze the transportation needs of the area. The study's suggestions included turning Main Street into a one-way route and improving bicycle and pedestrian access. An implementation committee was appointed in 2007 to study ways to use the plan.

== Education ==
The village is in New Paltz Central School District.

== Notable people ==
- Abe Attell, boxing champion.
- Terry Austin, comic book Artist and Inker
- Benjamin F. Church, Milwaukee, Wisconsin pioneer
- Charles Davis, NFL Television Commentator
- Peter Dinklage, actor.
- Lewis DuBois, descendant of the original Huguenot refugees and a military commander in the Continental Army during the American Revolution.
- Louis Dubois, founder of one of the earliest Huguenot colonies in the Americas.* Mary Gordon, novelist.
- Sandy Duncan, actor of Broadway theatre and television fame.
- Vladimir Feltsman, Distinguished Professor of Piano at the State University of New York at New Paltz
- Owen King, author and son of Stephen King.
- Jay Le Fevre, former US Congress member
- Dana Lyons, folk music and alternative rock musician
- Floyd Patterson, heavyweight boxing champion.
- Keith Schiller, Deputy Assistant and Director of Oval Office Operations for President Donald Trump
- John Turturro, Hollywood Actor
- Jason West, two-term former mayor of New Paltz.
- Andrew Yang, founder of Venture for America and 2020 candidate for U.S. president

== Sister city ==
Niimi, Okayama, Japan

== Notes ==
a. Candidates who have run as non-partisan or members of local parties.
b.Jason West served two non-consecutive terms.

== Bibliography ==
- Sylvester, Nathaniel Bartlett (1880). History of Ulster County, New York, with Illustrations and Biographical Sketches of its Prominent Men and Pioneers: Part Second: History of the Towns of Ulster County. Philadelphia, PA: Everts & Peck. OCLC 2385957.
- Le Fevre, Ralph (1903). History of New Paltz, New York and Its Old Families (from 1678 to 1820) Including the Huguenot Pioneers and Others Who Settled in New Paltz Previous to the Revolution. Albany, NY: Fort Orange Press. OCLC 3653171.
