= Accord Speedway =

Motorsport venue in Accord, New York

- Location: Accord, New York
- Coordinates: 41.8291°N 74.2203°W
- Owner: Gary and Donna Palmer
- Opened: 1962
- Former names: Fastlane USA
- Website: accordspeedway.com

Oval
- Surface: Clay
- Length: .4 km (0.25 mi)
- Turns: 4
- Banking: Semi-banked

Accord Speedway is a one-quarter mile dirt oval raceway located the Hudson Valley Region of New York State.

== Overview ==
Harry Osterhout decided to make a go-kart track for his son and his friends in the middle of a cornfield during the 1950s. It became a community attraction, and officially opened as the Accord Speedway in 1962. In 2001, Gary and Donna Palmer bought the track, and have since enhanced it with VIP suites, a new lighting system, reworked the racing surface, and many other upgrades.

== Events ==
The Accord Speedway offers auto racing on Friday evenings throughout the summer. The track features the Modifeds, Sportsman, Pure Stock, wingless Sprint Cars and Four Cylinders.

In 2024, the facility was approved to host car shows, jeep challenges, rodeo's and similar events.
