= New Paltz Downtown Historic District =

Historic district in New York, United States

- U.S. National Register of Historic Places
- U.S. Historic district
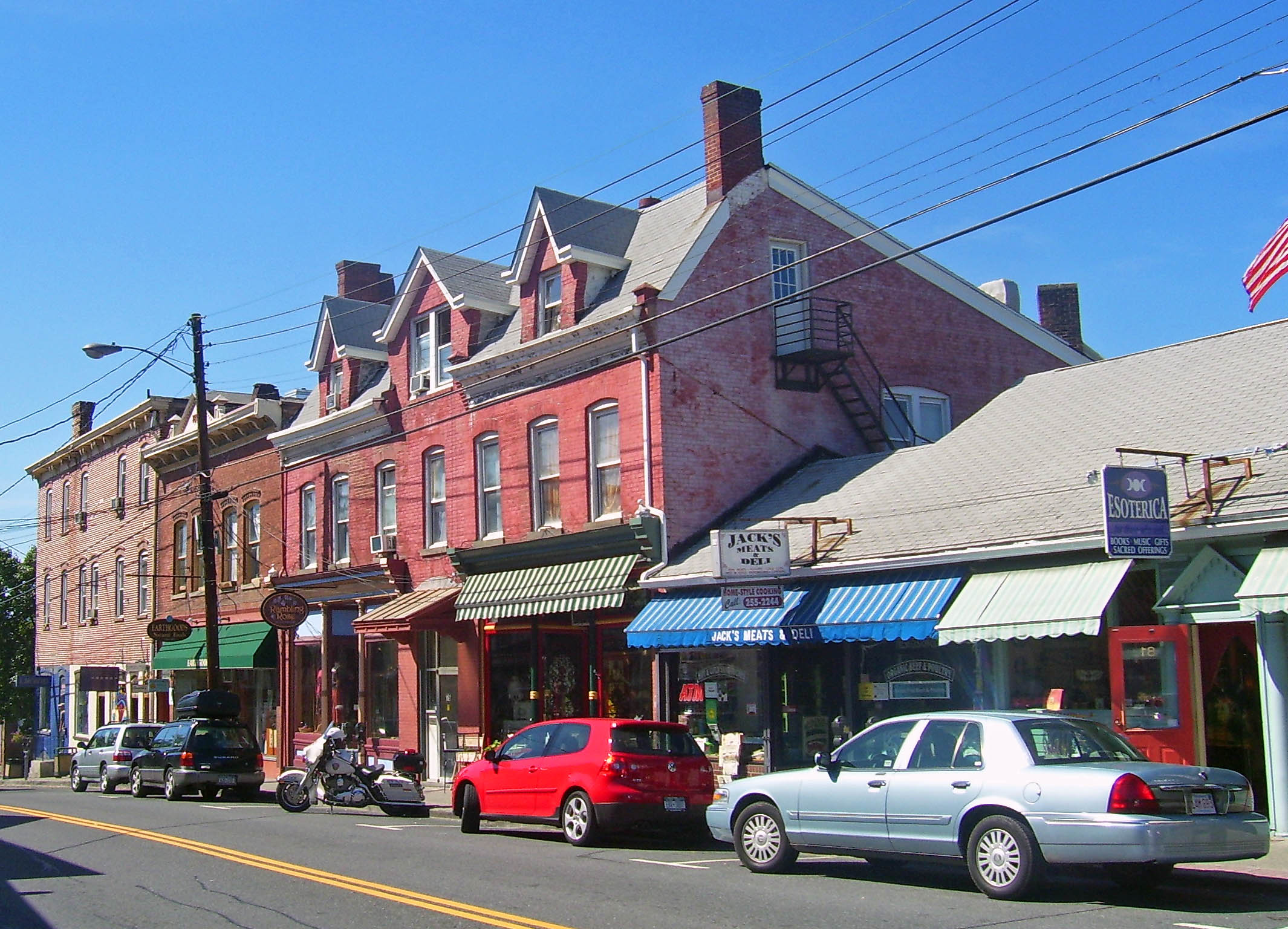
- New Paltz Downtown Historic District, September 2007

- Location within New York Location within the United States
- Location: Main, N. Chestnut, S. Chestnut, Church, N. Front, Academy and W. Center Sts., Innis and Plattekill Aves. New Paltz, New York
- Coordinates: 41°44′53.25″N 74°5′6.3″W
- Area: 37.8 acres (15.3 ha)
- Architect: Multiple
- NRHP reference No.: 09000561
- Added to NRHP: July 24, 2009

New Paltz Downtown Historic District is a national historic district located at New Paltz in Ulster County, New York. The district includes 147 contributing buildings, one contributing site, and eight contributing structures. It encompasses most of the portion of the village that was developed in the 19th century as it became the commercial center for a growing agricultural town. Located within the district is the separately listed Elting Memorial Library.

It was listed on the National Register of Historic Places in 2009.
