= New Paltz (town), New York =

New Paltz
- Town
- Town of New Paltz
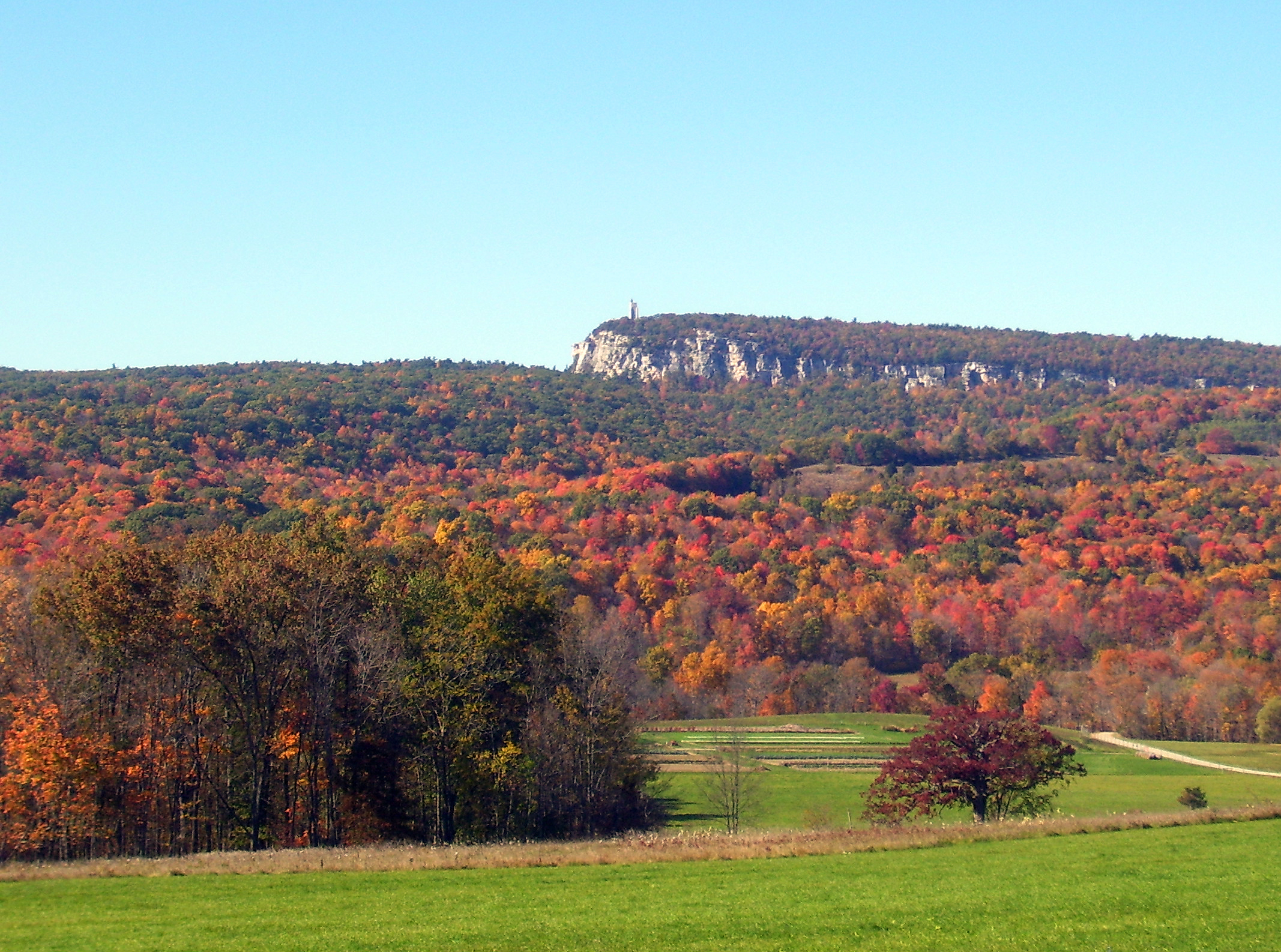
- Paltz Point view from east, a view that dominates the town

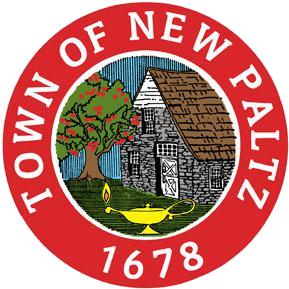
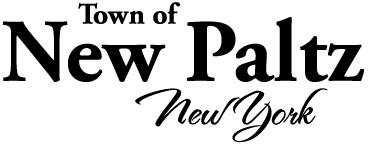
- Seal Wordmark
- Etymology: Palatine dialect pronunciation of Pfalz
- Location in Ulster County and New York

- Location of New York in the United States
- Coordinates: 41°44′53″N 74°05′06″W
- Country: United States
- State: New York
- County: Ulster
- Founded: 1678

Government
  - Type: Town council
  - Supervisor: Tim Rogers (D)

Area
  - Total: 34.31 sq mi (88.85 km^{2})
  - Land: 33.88 sq mi (87.74 km^{2})
  - Water: 0.43 sq mi (1.12 km^{2}) 1.25%
- Elevation: 239 ft (73 m)
- Lowest elevation: 160 ft (49 m)

Population (2020)
  - Total: 14,407
  - Density: 425/sq mi (164.2/km^{2})
- Time zone: UTC-5 (EST)
  - Summer (DST): UTC-4 (EDT)
- ZIP Code: 12561
- Area code: 845
- FIPS code: 36-111-50562
- GNIS feature ID: 00979269
- Wikimedia Commons: New Paltz, New York
- Website: Town of New Paltz, NY

The Town of New Paltz (locally /ˈnuː pɔːlz/) is an incorporated U.S. town in Ulster County, New York. The population was 14,407 at the 2020 census. The town is located in the southeastern part of the county and is south of Kingston. New Paltz contains a village, also with the name New Paltz. The town is named for Palz ([ˈpalts]), the dialect name of the Palatinate, called Pfalz (IPA: [ˈpfalts]) in standard German.

Due to the presence of what is now the State University of New York at New Paltz, it has been a college town for over 150 years.

== History ==
The town of New Paltz was founded in 1678 by French Huguenots by both patent from the governor and purchase from the local Esopus tribe of the Lenape people. Prior to the purchase of New Paltz during the 17th century, the Esopus tribe had been pressured off much of their land which is now present day Ulster and Sullivan counties, because of conflicts known as the Esopus Wars. As a result, the Esopus were willing to exchange the land for a hefty sum of goods. The Huguenots were religious refugees from France who had immigrated via Mannheim in the German Palatinate, where they had settled after fleeing France during religious persecution. They settled in the area of the present-day village of New Paltz (on what is now known as Huguenot Street Historic District) and established their own local government.

The size of the town increased with annexation from surrounding regions in 1775 and 1809. In 1842, part of New Paltz was removed to form the Town of Esopus. More of New Paltz was removed in order to form the towns of Rosendale (1844), Lloyd (1845), and Gardiner (1853).

New Paltz's current borders also encompass two now-defunct hamlets: Springtown (also known as Wallkill West) and Butterville (also known as Oleynuit, the Dutch word for butternut tree). Springtown is also listed in the official New York State Gazetteer, maintained and published by the New York State Department of Health, which includes numerous defunct hamlets and towns, some with alternate or archaic spellings.

== Geography ==
The Wallkill River flows northward through New Paltz on its way to join the Rondout Creek, which in turn feeds into the Hudson River. A portion of the Shawangunk Ridge is in the town.

According to the United States Census Bureau, the town has a total area of 34.31 square miles (88.9 km^{2}), of which 33.88 square miles (87.7 km^{2}) is land and 0.43 square miles (1.1 km^{2}) (1.25%) is water.

== Transportation ==
New Paltz is accessible by a number of different roads. Interstate 87 (the New York State Thruway) is the main thoroughfare and passes through in the eastern part and houses Exit 18 for Route 299. State routes that traverse through are Route 32, Route 208, and Route 299.

The nearest train station is about 11 miles (18 km) away, in Poughkeepsie. Both Amtrak and Metro-North trains serve Poughkeepsie. Adirondack Trailways also provides bus transportation from New Paltz into various locations across multiple states.

The western terminus of the Hudson Valley Rail Trail is located here. The hiking/biking path eventually crosses the Walkway over the Hudson and becomes the Dutchess Rail Trail that ends in Hopewell Junction.

== Education ==
New Paltz has four public schools (K-12) and is home to a college in the SUNY system:

- Duzine Elementary School (K-2)
- Lenape Elementary School (3-5)
- New Paltz Middle School (6-8)
- New Paltz High School (9-12)
- State University of New York at New Paltz

The town is also home to several private schools, including Mountain Laurel Waldorf School pre-K through grade 8), Montessori of New Paltz (pre-K through grade 3), and Huguenot Street Cooperative Nursery School (pre-K).

== Government ==
The town is governed by a town council, composed of four at-large members and a supervisor. The deputy supervisor is an appointed role that does not carry voting rights.

Name	Position	Took office	Left office	Political affiliation
Tim Rogers	Supervisor	January 1, 2026	Incumbent	Democratic Party
William Charnock	Deputy supervisor	January 1, 2026	Incumbent	Democratic Party
Kitty Brown	Council member	January 1, 2026	Incumbent	Democratic Party
Kate Ryan	Council member	January 1, 2026	Incumbent	Democratic Party
Lauren McPadden	Council member	January 1, 2026	Incumbent	Democratic Party
Sean O'Sullivan	Council member	January 1, 2026	Incumbent	Democratic Party

== Demographics ==
Historical population
Census	Pop.	Note	%±
1820	4,612		—
1830	5,105		10.7%
1840	5,408		5.9%
1850	2,729		−49.5%
1860	2,023		−25.9%
1870	2,040		0.8%
1880	1,958		−4.0%
1890	2,242		14.5%
1900	2,264		1.0%
1910	3,025		33.6%
1920	2,163		−28.5%
1930	2,550		17.9%
1940	2,815		10.4%
1950	3,749		33.2%
1960	5,841		55.8%
1970	10,415		78.3%
1980	10,183		−2.2%
1990	11,388		11.8%
2000	12,830		12.7%
2010	14,003		9.1%
2020	14,407		2.9%
U.S. Decennial Census

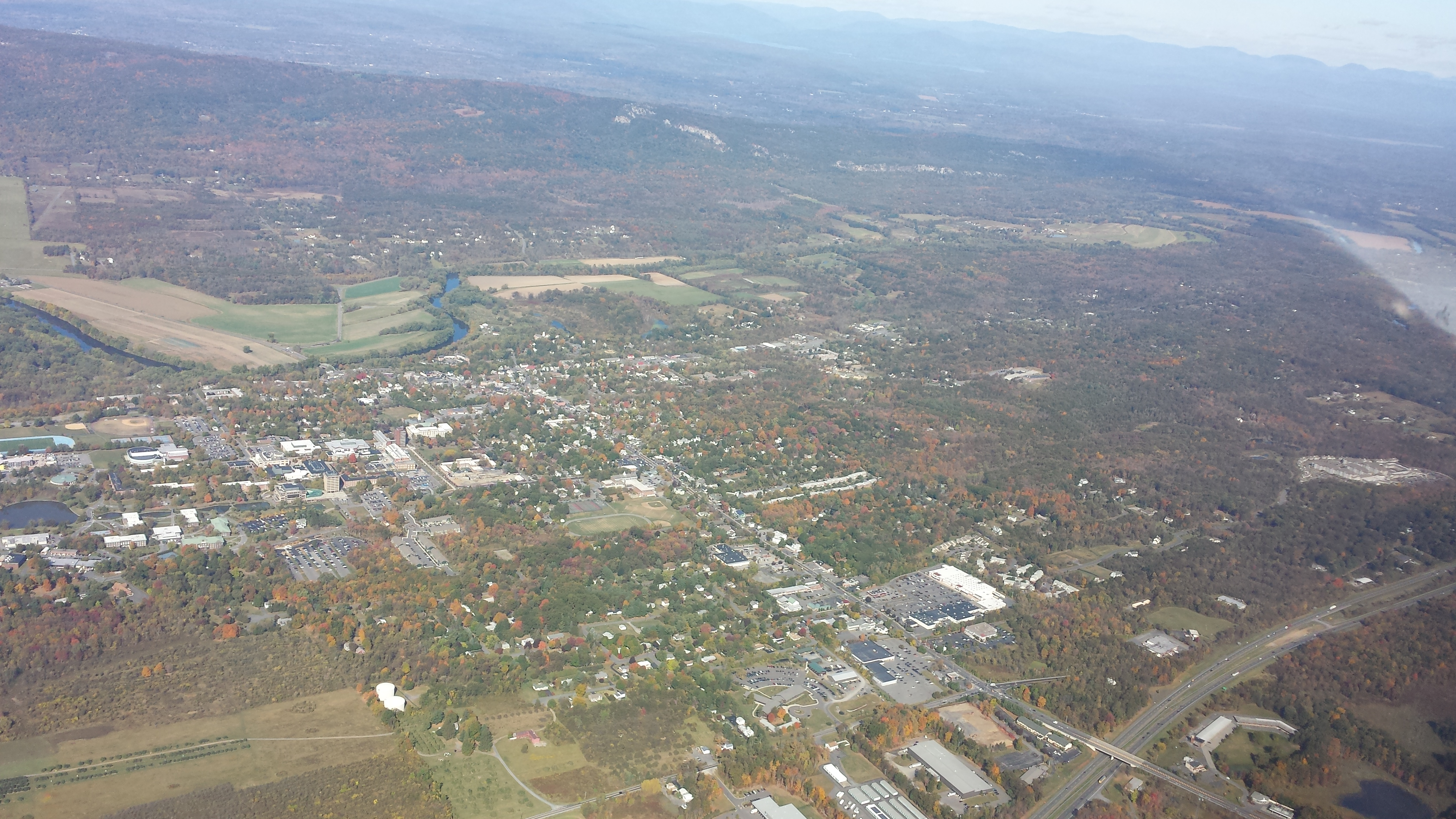
Aerial view of New Paltz at an altitude of 3,500 feet MSL, looking west

=== 2010 census ===
As of the 2010 census, the population was 14,003. The racial makeup of the town was 84.72% White, 5.35% Black or African American, 0.31% Native American, 4.36% Asian, 0.04% Pacific Islander, 2.46% from other races, and 2.76% from two or more races. Hispanic or Latino of any race were 8.81% of the population.

=== 2020 census ===
As of the 2020 census, the population was 14,407. The racial makeup of the town was 74.01% White, 5.72% Black or African American, 0.26% Native American, 5.46% Asian, 0.06% Pacific Islander, 5.11% from other races, and 8.67% from two or more races. Hispanic or Latino of any race were 12.74% of the population.

== Historic places ==
- Minnewaska State Park
- Elting Memorial Library
- Huguenot Street Historic District
- Mohonk Mountain House

== Notable people ==
- Abe Attell, boxing champion
- Terry Austin, comic book artist
- Benjamin F. Church, pioneer
- Charles Davis, NFL player and television commentator
- Peter Dinklage, actor.
- Lewis DuBois, military commander in the Continental Army
- Louis DuBois, Huguenot colonist
- Sandy Duncan, Broadway and television actor
- Ronald Enroth (born 1938), Professor of Sociology at Westmont College.
- Vladimir Feltsman, piano teacher
- Mary Gordon, novelist
- Hasbrouck family, one of the founding families of New Paltz
- Owen King, author
- Jay Le Fevre, former US Congress member
- Shawn Levy, Film Director.
- Dana Lyons, musician
- Floyd Patterson, heavyweight boxing champion
- Mike Ricci, champion auto racing driver
- Rich Ricci Jr., champion auto racing driver
- Sydney Schanberg, former journalist at the New York Times and professor at State University of New York at New Paltz
- Keith Schiller, law enforcement officer and security expert
- Jordan Stern, musician, DJ and producer, known professionally as Vitesse X
- John Turturro, Hollywood actor
- Andrew Yang, founder of Venture for America and 2020 candidate for U.S. president

== Sister city ==
- Niimi, Okayama Prefecture, Japan
