= National Register of Historic Places listings in Ulster County, New York =

Location of Ulster County in New York

List of the National Register of Historic Places listings in Ulster County, New York

This is intended to be a complete list of properties and districts listed on the National Register of Historic Places in Ulster County, New York. The locations of National Register properties and districts (at least for all showing latitude and longitude coordinates below) may be seen in a map by clicking on "Map of all coordinates". Eight of the properties and districts are further designated as U.S. National Historic Landmarks. Photographs of many of these buildings may be found in Dutch Houses in the Hudson Valley Before 1776.

This National Park Service list is complete through NPS recent listings posted September 25, 2026.

Contents: Counties in New York
Albany (Albany) – Allegany – Bronx – Broome – Cattaraugus – Cayuga – Chautauqua – Chemung – Chenango – Clinton – Columbia – Cortland – Delaware – Dutchess (Poughkeepsie, Rhinebeck) – Erie (Buffalo) – Essex – Franklin – Fulton – Genesee – Greene – Hamilton – Herkimer – Jefferson – Kings – Lewis – Livingston – Madison – Monroe (Rochester) – Montgomery – Nassau – New York (Below 14th Street, 14th to 59th Streets, 59th to 110th Streets, Above 110th Street, Islands) – Niagara (Niagara Falls) – Oneida – Onondaga (Syracuse) – Ontario – Orange – Orleans – Oswego – Otsego – Putnam – Queens – Rensselaer – Richmond – Rockland – St. Lawrence – Saratoga – Schenectady – Schoharie – Schuyler – Seneca – Steuben – Suffolk – Sullivan – Tioga – Tompkins – Ulster – Warren – Washington – Wayne – Westchester (Northern, Southern, New Rochelle, Peekskill, Yonkers) – Wyoming – Yates

== Listings county-wide ==
	Name on the Register	Image	Date listed	Location	City or town	Description
1	Accord Historic District	Accord Historic District	January 24, 2020 (#100004909)	Devoe Ln., Granite Rd., Main St., Scenic Rd. Schoolhouse Rd., Tobacco Rd., Tow Path Rd. 41°47′09″N 74°13′47″W	Accord	Well-preserved hamlet along the former Delaware and Hudson Canal and Rondout Creek
2	Peter Aldrich Homestead		September 26, 1983 (#83001811)	168 Decker Rd. 41°40′11″N 74°15′24″W	Gardiner	1750 frame house of early settler; later expanded; part of the Shawangunk Valley Multiple Resource Area (MRA)
3	All Saints' Chapel	All Saints' Chapel	September 11, 1986 (#86002511)	Main St. 41°50′44″N 74°04′35″W	Rosendale	Unusual 1876 Gothic Revival church building with Ruskinesque touches finished in locally mined Rosendale cement. Used as Rosendale library since 1959.
4	Alligerville Historic District	Alligerville Historic District	June 30, 2015 (#15000370)	Berme, Church Hill, Creek, Rose Hill & Towpath Rds., Cty. Rd. 6, Church & Purcell Lns. 41°47′45″N 74°11′48″W	Alligerville	Well-preserved Delaware and Hudson Canal town
5	A.M.E. Zion Church of Kingston and Mt. Zion Cemetery	A.M.E. Zion Church of Kingston and Mt. Zion Cemetery	March 3, 2021 (#100006224)	26 Franklin St. and 190 South Wall St. 41°55′08″N 74°00′41″W	Kingston	A 1927 neo-Gothic church housing an African-American congregation established in 1848, and its nearby historic African-American cemetery.
6	Appeldoorn Farm	Appeldoorn Farm	March 20, 2013 (#13000099)	4938 US 209; 41°47′47″N 74°12′56″W	Accord	Farmstead has remained in same family, with many original buildings, for almost 300 years.
7	Asbury Historic District		November 8, 2021 (#100007096)	Old King's Hwy., West Camp, Schoolhouse, Wilhelm, and Charles Smith Rds. 42°08′30″N 73°57′13″W	Saugerties	250 acres of first farms established by Palatine Germans resettled in the area in early 18th century; still rural today
8	Ashokan Field Campus Historic District		April 16, 2019 (#100003622)	477 Beaverkill Rd. 41°55′46″N 74°12′08″W	Olive Bridge	Oldest outdoor environmental education center in state built on property first developed for farming in the 18th century
9	Ashokan-Turnwood Covered Bridge	Ashokan-Turnwood Covered Bridge	July 20, 2000 (#00000822)	477 Beaverkill Rd. 41°55′36″N 74°11′58″W	Olive Bridge	
10	Sebastian Baker Stone House		February 22, 1996 (#96000136)	10 Dug Rd. 41°49′55″N 74°14′40″W	Rochester	part of the Rochester Multiple Property Submission (MPS)
11	Balsam Lake Mountain Fire Observation Station	Balsam Lake Mountain Fire Observation Station	September 23, 2001 (#01001038)	Balsam Lake Mountain; 42°04′11″N 74°34′28″W	Hardenburgh	Earliest site of a fire lookout in the Catskills. Current tower built in 1930 and used till 1988. Part of the Fire Observation Stations of New York State Forest Preserve MPS
12	Zachariah Barley Stone House	Zachariah Barley Stone House	August 10, 1995 (#95000951)	193 Whitfield Rd. 41°49′32″N 74°14′22″W	Rochester	part of the Rochester MPS
13	Beaverkill Valley Inn	Beaverkill Valley Inn	September 12, 1985 (#85002280)	Beaverkill Rd. 42°01′24″N 74°45′06″W	Lew Beach	1895 inn is one of few surviving fishing lodges from early years of Beaverkill angling
14	George W. Bellows House	George W. Bellows House	February 2, 2018 (#100002081)	9 Bellows Ln. 42°02′46″N 74°07′16″W	Woodstock	1921 cottage built as summer retreat by artist George Bellows
15	Bevier House	Bevier House	September 26, 1983 (#83001812)	Bevier Rd. 41°40′57″N 74°10′19″W	Gardiner	Mid-19th-century farmhouse, one of few intact ones in Shawangunk Valley that predate Civil War; part of the Shawangunk Valley MRA
16	Bevier Stone House	Bevier Stone House	March 12, 2002 (#02000135)	2687 US 209; 41°53′25″N 74°06′11″W	Marbletown	
17	Binnewater Historic District	Binnewater Historic District	November 4, 1982 (#82001272)	Sawdust Ave., Breezy Hill and Binnewater Rds. 41°51′27″N 74°05′10″W	Rosendale	
18	Boice House	Boice House	December 28, 2001 (#01001388)	110 Fair St. 41°55′40″N 74°00′58″W	Kingston	1850s Greek Revival home remodeled in Second Empire style by local quarry owner
19	Brown–Ellis House		June 17, 2014 (#14000316)	382 Crescent Ave. 41°42′12″N 74°02′33″W	Highland	Well-preserved farmhouse of early settler
20	Emile Brunel Studio and Sculpture Garden	Emile Brunel Studio and Sculpture Garden	August 10, 1999 (#99000909)	NY 28; 41°59′49″N 74°15′52″W	Boiceville	Surviving pre–World War II Catskills roadside attraction. Studio built in imitation of European farmhouse, an unusual style in the region.
21	Bruynswick School No. 8	Bruynswick School No. 8	November 2, 2000 (#00001277)	2146 Bruynswick Rd. 41°39′33″N 74°13′36″W	Shawangunk	Intact 19th-century wooden one-room schoolhouse
22	Brykill	Brykill	September 26, 1983 (#83001813)	Bruynswick Rd. 41°39′56″N 74°13′02″W	Gardiner	1724 stone house greatly expanded into sympathetic Colonial Revival mansion by Myron Teller in 1927. Now an organic grass-fed beef ranch. Part of the Shawangunk Valley MRA
23	John Burroughs Cabin	John Burroughs Cabin	November 24, 1968 (#68000034)	West of West Park; 41°47′48″N 73°58′26″W	West Park	Naturalist John Burroughs' cabin known as "Slabsides"
24	John Burroughs Riverby Study	John Burroughs Riverby Study	November 24, 1968 (#68000035)	Between US 9W and the Hudson River; 41°48′17″N 73°58′25″W	West Park	Burroughs' study at his West Park estate
25	Byrdcliffe Historic District	Byrdcliffe Historic District	May 7, 1979 (#79001643)	West of Woodstock at Glasco Tpke. and Larks Nest Rd. 42°03′14″N 74°08′17″W	Woodstock	Utopian artists' community
26	Camp Wapanachki	Camp Wapanachki	November 25, 1994 (#94001372)	S. Plank Rd. (Old Co. Rt 28) at the junction with Miller Rd., Shandaken; 42°02′56″N 74°16′21″W	Mt. Tremper	
27	Chapel Hill Bible Church	Chapel Hill Bible Church	January 7, 2005 (#04001450)	49 Bingham Rd. 41°35′12″N 73°59′42″W	Marlboro	Gothic Revival church originally built 1860 in Manhattan moved to Marlboro in 1905.
28	Chestnut Street Historic District	Chestnut Street Historic District	September 19, 1985 (#85002443)	Roughly bounded by W. Chestnut St., Broadway, E. Chestnut, Livingston & Stuyvesant Sts. 41°55′24″N 73°59′22″W	Kingston	
29	Chetolah	Chetolah	October 21, 1980 (#80002782)	South of Cragsmoor on Vista Maria Rd. 41°39′39″N 74°22′39″W	Cragsmoor	Late 19th-century estate
30	Chichester House	Chichester House	December 28, 2001 (#01001392)	116 Fair St. 41°55′41″N 74°00′58″W	Kingston	Intact 1870s Second Empire house
31	Walstein Childs House		July 3, 2003 (#03000602)	Sand Hill Rd., Wallkill Correctional Facility; 41°38′33″N 74°10′08″W	Wallkill	Intact late 18th-century stone house
32	Christ Episcopal Church	Christ Episcopal Church	November 10, 2010 (#10000916)	426 Old Post Road; 41°36′01″N 73°58′18″W	Marlboro	
33	Christ Lutheran Church and Parsonage	Christ Lutheran Church and Parsonage	May 28, 2010 (#10000304)	105-107 Center Street; 41°42′54″N 74°23′34″W	Ellenville	
34	Church of the Holy Transfiguration of Christ-on-the-Mount	Church of the Holy Transfiguration of Christ-on-the-Mount	December 9, 2005 (#05001385)	Mead's Mountain Rd. 42°03′42″N 74°07′18″W	Woodstock	
35	Clinton Avenue Historic District	Clinton Avenue Historic District	February 5, 1970 (#70000434)	Clinton Ave. and Fair St. 41°56′05″N 74°01′29″W	Kingston	Neighborhood around Senate House was first historic district in city; now part of larger Stockade District
36	Cole-Hasbrouck Farm Historic District	Cole-Hasbrouck Farm Historic District	November 10, 1994 (#94001240)	NY 32, north of the junction with US 44 and NY 55; 41°40′08″N 74°06′24″W	Modena	
37	Common School No. 10	Common School No. 10	September 15, 1988 (#88001439)	Northside of Upper Cherrytown Rd. 41°52′47″N 74°19′18″W	Accord	
38	Community Theatre	Community Theatre	July 22, 1979 (#79001639)	601 Broadway; 41°55′46″N 74°00′17″W	Kingston	1926 Classical Revival theater is only pre–World War II theater left in city and one of only three in the Hudson Valley. Now Ulster Performing Arts Center and home to the Hudson Valley Philharmonic
39	Congregation Tifereth Yehuda Veyisroel	Congregation Tifereth Yehuda Veyisroel	August 27, 2013 (#13000632)	24–26 Minnewaska Trail; 41°46′14″N 74°17′52″W	Kerhonkson	One of 20 intact early 20th-century Catskill synagogues
40	Cordts Mansion	Cordts Mansion	October 3, 2007 (#07001039)	82-152 Lindsley Ave. 41°55′46″N 73°58′22″W	Kingston	
41	Coykendall Lodge	Coykendall Lodge	January 11, 2002 (#01001441)	Off Alder Lake Rd. 42°03′15″N 74°40′27″W	Hardenburgh	Remains of Shingle Style lodge of rail magnate Samuel Coykendall, now one of the few non-fire tower structures allowed to remain on Forest Preserve land
42	Cragsmoor Historic District	Cragsmoor Historic District	August 8, 1996 (#96000860)	Roughly bounded by Henry, Cragsmoor, and Sam's Pt. Rds., Hamlet of Cragsmoor; 41°40′13″N 74°22′36″W	Cragsmoor	Artists' community with many ornate 19th-century houses
43	J. B. Crowell and Son Brick Mould Mill Complex	J. B. Crowell and Son Brick Mould Mill Complex	June 30, 1983 (#83001814)	Lippencott Rd. 41°37′25″N 74°11′49″W	Wallkill	Intact late-19th-century commercial complex still in use
44	Cumming-Parker House		February 12, 2010 (#10000014)	50 Appletree Road; 41°49′58″N 73°57′31″W	Esopus	
45	Davis Stone House		August 12, 1999 (#99000995)	4652 US 209; 41°49′09″N 74°12′01″W	Rochester	part of the Rochester MPS
46	De Meyer-Burhans-Felten Farm		August 17, 2020 (#100005452)	81-101 Bogert Ln. 42°00′22″N 73°59′52″W	Ulster	
47	Johannes Decker Farm	Johannes Decker Farm	March 5, 1974 (#74001312)	Southwest of Gardiner on Red Mill Rd. and Shawangunk Kill; 41°38′33″N 74°14′03″W	Gardiner	
48	William Decker House	William Decker House	September 26, 1983 (#83001815)	New Prospect Rd. 41°38′51″N 74°15′49″W	Shawangunk	Stone house of early settler of Town of Shawangunk; part of the Shawangunk Valley MRA
49	Delaware and Hudson Canal	Delaware and Hudson Canal	November 24, 1968 (#68000051)	Delaware and Hudson Canal; 41°47′13″N 74°14′29″W	Linear through county from Spring Glen to Creeklocks	Remains of canal and locks that provided anthracite coal from Northeastern Pennsylvania to New York City in the 19th century, spurring city's growth
50	Demarest-Bernard House	Demarest-Bernard House	May 7, 2026 (#100012990)	133 Crow Hill Road; 41°42′37″N 74°02′45″W	Highland	1798 stone house with local material but building techniques more typical of such houses further south, in New Jersey
51	Deyo-Dubois House	Deyo-Dubois House	August 17, 2020 (#100005451)	161 Vineyard Ave. 41°42′45″N 73°58′22″W	Highland	
52	Dill Farm	Dill Farm	September 26, 1983 (#83001816)	Off Goebel Rd. 41°38′35″N 74°15′45″W	Shawangunk	Ca. 1760 family farm with original buildings from the early 19th century. Part of the Shawangunk Valley MRA
53	District School No. 14	District School No. 14	February 21, 1997 (#97000111)	Academy St., south of the junction with Birch Cr. Rd. 42°08′06″N 74°28′47″W	Pine Hill	1925 building reflects changes in state standards for rural schools and combines Colonial Revival and Craftsman styles.
54	Andries DuBois House	Andries DuBois House	August 6, 1998 (#98001011)	75 Wallkill Ave. 41°36′36″N 74°11′13″W	Wallkill	Oldest house in Wallkill; recently restored to original appearance
55	DuBois-Deyo House	DuBois-Deyo House	November 25, 1994 (#94001374)	437 Springtown Rd. 41°48′16″N 74°05′12″W	Rosendale	
56	Dubois-Kierstede Stone House	Dubois-Kierstede Stone House	May 20, 1998 (#98000550)	119 Main St. 42°04′45″N 73°56′59″W	Saugerties	1727 stone house used as museum
57	Dubois-Sarles Octagon	Dubois-Sarles Octagon	November 15, 2002 (#02001322)	16 South St. 41°36′02″N 73°58′27″W	Marlboro	Second Empire-style octagon house built in the 1850s and modified 1872. Rare such home built on a sidehall plan.
58	Hendrikus DuBois House	Hendrikus DuBois House	July 8, 1982 (#82003410)	600 Albany Post Rd. 41°43′15″N 74°08′56″W	Libertyville	House of son of "Duzine" who served in militia during Revolution
59	Ephriam DuPuy Stone House	Ephriam DuPuy Stone House	August 10, 1995 (#95000952)	193 Whitfield Rd. 41°49′10″N 74°13′18″W	Rochester	Mid-18th-century stone house; part of the Rochester MPS
60	J. Dupuy Stone House	J. Dupuy Stone House	February 21, 1997 (#97000110)	Krum Rd., west of the junction with Queens Hwy. 41°48′09″N 74°16′45″W	Rochester	1840 stone house was raised only on front facade; part of the Rochester MPS
61	Ellenville Downtown Historic District	Ellenville Downtown Historic District	June 20, 2012 (#12000344)	Canal, Center, Liberty, Main, & Market Sts. 41°43′01″N 74°23′36″W	Ellenville	Core of village reflecting change from 19th-century canal town to early 20th-century resort area.
62	Elliot–Buckley House	Elliot–Buckley House	September 29, 2011 (#11000710)	204 Old Post Rd. 41°35′04″N 73°58′14″W	Marlboro	Built in 1843 by Dr. Daniel Elliot, sold to the Buckley family in 1866.
63	Elm Street Stone Arch Bridge	Elm Street Stone Arch Bridge	December 16, 1996 (#96001437)	Elm St., over Alton Creek; 42°08′00″N 74°28′48″W	Pine Hill	1900 bridge is one of few stone arch bridges remaining in county
64	Elting Memorial Library	Elting Memorial Library	May 12, 2004 (#04000432)	93 Main St. 41°44′54″N 74°05′07″W	New Paltz	Main library of New Paltz; expanded from old stone house
65	Esopus Meadows Lighthouse	Esopus Meadows Lighthouse	May 29, 1979 (#79001638)	Spans Hudson River; 41°52′16″N 73°56′45″W	Esopus	part of the Hudson River Lighthouses Thematic Resource (TR)
66	First Reformed Protestant Dutch Church of Kingston	First Reformed Protestant Dutch Church of Kingston	October 10, 2008 (#08001089)	272 Wall Street; 41°55′58″N 74°01′10″W	Kingston	Minard Lefever-designed 1852 church for congregation dating to 1659, one of oldest in U.S. in continuous existence. Only Lafever stone church, and his only Renaissance Revival church retaining its original integrity.
67	Fitch Bluestone Company Office	Fitch Bluestone Company Office	May 16, 2016 (#16000256)	532-574 Abeel St. 41°54′35″N 74°00′09″W	Kingston	Distinctive 1870 office made, unusually, entirely of bluestone
68	James and Mary Forsyth House	James and Mary Forsyth House	July 3, 2003 (#03000603)	31 Albany Ave. 41°55′58″N 74°00′53″W	Kingston	1849 Richard Upjohn Italian villa is one of only two pre-Civil War buildings, and only house, by a nationally prominent architect in the city
69	Fuller Shirt Company Factory	Fuller Shirt Company Factory	July 27, 2018 (#100002745)	45 Pine Grove Avenue; 41°55′36″N 74°00′07″W	Kingston	Main manufactuting facility of local garment company built in 1906 and used through 1965
70	Gardiner School	Gardiner School	November 22, 2000 (#00001423)	2340 US 44/NY 55; 41°40′43″N 74°08′59″W	Gardiner	Late-19th-century wooden school building now used as town hall following restoration
71	Grant Mills Covered Bridge	Grant Mills Covered Bridge	December 17, 1998 (#98001538)	Mill Brook Rd., over Mill Brook; 42°04′48″N 74°37′45″W	Hardenburgh	Intact 1902 covered bridge, highest one in Catskills. Now carries foot traffic only
72	Guilford-Bower Farm House		July 8, 1999 (#99000810)	Albany Post Rd. 41°42′40″N 74°09′30″W	New Paltz	
73	Thaddeus Hait Farm	Thaddeus Hait Farm	December 29, 1988 (#88003075)	75 Allhusen Rd. 41°40′43″N 74°05′23″W	Modena	Mostly intact early-19th-century farm now returned to original use as winery
74	Hardenbergh-Jenkins Farm		August 17, 2020 (#100005453)	128 Crispell Ln. 41°41′51″N 74°09′49″W	Gardiner	
75	Jean Hasbrouck House	Jean Hasbrouck House	December 24, 1967 (#67000016)	Huguenot and N. Front Sts. 41°45′06″N 74°05′20″W	New Paltz	Best example of Belgian stone house among the Huguenot Street homes; only one with jambless fireplace
76	Major Jacob Hasbrouck Jr. House	Major Jacob Hasbrouck Jr. House	July 23, 1999 (#99000808)	193 Huguenot St. 41°45′38″N 74°05′11″W	New Paltz	Home built in 1786 by Jean Hasbrouck's grandson, a veteran of the Revolution and town supervisor; modified in different ways by descendants over 19th century. Last major stone house in Ulster County and only one still owned by descendants of same family
77	Judge Jonathan Hasbrouck House	Judge Jonathan Hasbrouck House	March 6, 2013 (#13000056)	20 Elwyn Lane; 42°02′29″N 74°06′49″W	Woodstock	Stone house built ca. 1800 is excellent example of Ulster County residential architecture from that time.
78	Al Held House and Studio		January 25, 2021 (#100005440)	26 Beechford Dr. 42°01′03″N 74°15′59″W	Boiceville	
79	High Falls Historic District	High Falls Historic District	August 6, 1998 (#98001005)	Roughly along NY 213 and Main St. 41°49′36″N 74°07′42″W	High Falls	Semi-planned area around major stopping point on D & H Canal
80	Holy Cross Monastery	Holy Cross Monastery	February 24, 1995 (#95000045)	US 9W, east side 41°48′07″N 73°57′26″W	West Park	First house established in Order of the Holy Cross by founder The Rev. James Otis Sargent Huntington, in 1904.
81	The Home for the Aged in Ulster County	The Home for the Aged in Ulster County	May 12, 2025 (#100011784)	80 Washington Avenue; 41°55′34″N 74°01′00″W	Kingston	
82	Jacob Hoornbeck Stone House	Jacob Hoornbeck Stone House	February 21, 1997 (#97000108)	Boice Mill Rd., junction with Krum Rd. 41°47′48″N 74°17′33″W	Rochester	1800 stone house in Georgian style built onto smaller earlier rear wing; part of the Rochester MPS
83	Hoornbeek Store Complex	Hoornbeek Store Complex	February 9, 1984 (#84003229)	Main St. between Clinton & Church Sts. 41°44′28″N 74°22′27″W	Napanoch	Early-19th-century store complex shows transition between Federal and Greek Revival styles.
84	Hornbeck Stone House	Hornbeck Stone House	August 10, 1995 (#95000957)	149 Whitfield Rd. 41°49′02″N 74°13′18″W	Rochester	1750 stone house; part of the Rochester MPS
85	House at 184 Albany Avenue	House at 184 Albany Avenue	November 15, 2002 (#02001317)	184 Albany Ave. 41°56′01″N 74°00′29″W	Kingston	Intact ca. 1860 Picturesque house; part of the Albany Avenue, Kingston, Ulster County, New York MPS
86	House at 272 Albany Avenue	House at 272 Albany Avenue	October 20, 2020 (#100007079)	272 Albany Ave. 41°56′10″N 74°00′19″W	Kingston	1890 Colonial Revival house with Queen Anne decoration expanded to current size by 1914
87	House at 313 Albany Avenue	House at 313 Albany Avenue	November 15, 2002 (#02001313)	313 Albany Ave. 41°56′16″N 74°00′17″W	Kingston	1896 "Hutton House" in "Free Classical" mode of Queen Anne Style, showing transition to Colonial Revival; part of the Albany Avenue, Kingston, Ulster County, New York MPS
88	House at 322 Albany Avenue	House at 322 Albany Avenue	November 15, 2002 (#02001319)	322 Albany Ave. 41°56′15″N 74°00′15″W	Kingston	Early-19th-century stone house renovated in 1840s Greek Revival and 1930s Colonial Revival; part of the Albany Avenue, Kingston, Ulster County, New York MPS
89	House at 356 Albany Avenue	House at 356 Albany Avenue	November 15, 2002 (#02001318)	356 Albany Ave. 41°55′57″N 74°00′32″W	Kingston	1897 house in Queen Anne "Free Classical" phase; part of the Albany Avenue, Kingston, Ulster County, New York MPS
90	Huguenot Street Historic District	Huguenot Street Historic District	October 15, 1966 (#66000578)	Huguenot St. 41°45′06″N 74°05′19″W	New Paltz	Late-17th-century stone houses built by founders of New Paltz; one of the oldest continuously inhabited neighborhoods in Anglo-America
91	George and John R. Hunt Memorial Building	George and John R. Hunt Memorial Building	January 14, 2005 (#04001481)	2 Liberty St., corner of Liberty and Canal Sts. 41°43′02″N 74°23′38″W	Ellenville	Neoclassical building from the early 20th century has seen a variety of uses, mainly as village library.
92	Hurley Historic District	Hurley Historic District	October 15, 1966 (#66000577)	Hurley St., Hurley Mountain Rd., and Schoonmaker Lane; 41°55′39″N 74°03′58″W	Hurley	Well-preserved early-18th-century Dutch stone houses; temporary capitol of New York for two months after burning of nearby Kingston
93	Johannes Jansen House and Dutch Barn	Johannes Jansen House and Dutch Barn	September 26, 1983 (#83001818)	Decker Rd. 41°40′01″N 74°16′11″W	Shawangunk	Stone house and farm of early settler; part of the Shawangunk Valley MRA
94	Thomas Jansen House	Thomas Jansen House	September 26, 1983 (#83001817)	Jansen Rd. 41°39′07″N 74°17′32″W	Shawangunk	Jansen's original 1727 stone house still stands as kitchen wing of Federal-style stone house his grandson built in the 1820s. Part of the Shawangunk Valley MRA
95	Jenkins-DuBois Farm and Mill Site	Jenkins-DuBois Farm and Mill Site	May 30, 2001 (#01000581)	Jenkinstown Rd. 41°41′46″N 74°06′38″W	Gardiner	1793 farm on land still owned by original family.
96	K. WHITTELSEY (tugboat)		November 21, 2002 (#02001395)	3 North St. at Rondout Creek; 41°55′20″N 73°58′13″W	Kingston	Scrapped in 2008.
97	William Kenyon House	William Kenyon House	December 28, 2001 (#01001387)	104 Fair St. 41°55′39″N 74°00′57″W	Kingston	Intact 1850 Italian villa-style house of local congressman
98	Kingston Barrel Factory	Kingston Barrel Factory	December 2, 2024 (#100011078)	35 Bruyn Avenue; 41°55′55″N 73°59′56″W	Kingston	
99	Kingston City Almshouse	Kingston City Almshouse	February 2, 2018 (#100002082)	300 Flatbush Ave. 41°56′28″N 73°59′20″W	Kingston	1872-74 stone Italianate building to care for city's poor; later used by county health department and currently vacant
100	Kingston City Hall	Kingston City Hall	December 9, 1971 (#71000563)	408 Broadway; 41°55′37″N 73°59′48″W	Kingston	1873 building, recently restored, sat on former Kingston-Rondout boundary to symbolize merged city.
101	Kingston City Library	Kingston City Library	December 7, 1995 (#95001404)	399 Broadway; 41°55′34″N 73°59′47″W	Kingston	1903 neoclassical Carnegie library
102	Kingston Gas and Electric Co. Building	Kingston Gas and Electric Co. Building	November 8, 2021 (#100007103)	609-611 Broadway; 41°55′46″N 74°00′18″W	Kingston	1912 Arts and Crafts commercial building from which utility company introduced the Kingston area to centralized power for 33 years.
103	Kingston Stockade District	Kingston Stockade District	June 19, 1975 (#75001231)	Area bounded by both sides of Clinton Ave., Main, Green, and Front Sts. 41°56′02″N 74°01′13″W	Kingston	Area inside 1654 stockade, commonly known as Uptown Kingston
104	Kingston-Port Ewen Suspension Bridge	Kingston-Port Ewen Suspension Bridge	April 30, 1980 (#80002783)	Wurtz St. (old U.S. 9W), across Rondout Creek; 41°55′02″N 73°59′08″W	Kingston and Port Ewen	Suspension bridge, started in 1916, completed in 1921 (interrupted by WWI steel shortage), was final link in US 9W up west side of Hudson, replacing the Skillypot ferry. 3 ton load limit; extensive reconstruction scheduled to commence in 2015.
105	Kingston/Rondout 2 Lighthouse	Kingston/Rondout 2 Lighthouse	May 29, 1979 (#79001640)	Hudson River and Rondout Creek; 41°55′38″N 73°58′19″W	Kingston	part of the Hudson River Lighthouses TR
106	Kirkland Hotel	Kirkland Hotel	November 15, 2002 (#02001323)	2 Main St. 41°55′59″N 74°01′01″W	Kingston	Rare surviving wood-frame urban hotel built in 1899
107	Kripplebush Historic District	Kripplebush Historic District	October 4, 1994 (#94001173)	Roughly, area surrounding Kripplebush and Pine Bush Rds. 41°50′18″N 74°11′17″W	Marbletown	
108	Krom Stone House and Dutch Barn	Krom Stone House and Dutch Barn	August 10, 1995 (#95000955)	Airport Rd. 41°49′01″N 74°12′35″W	Rochester	part of the Rochester MPS
109	Krom Stone House at 31 Upper Whitfield Road	Krom Stone House at 31 Upper Whitfield Road	August 10, 1995 (#95000954)	31 Upper Whitfield Rd. 41°49′43″N 74°13′39″W	Rochester	part of the Rochester MPS
110	Krom Stone House at 45 Upper Whitfield Road	Krom Stone House at 45 Upper Whitfield Road	August 10, 1995 (#95000950)	45 Upper Whitfield Rd. 41°49′43″N 74°13′52″W	Rochester	1780 stone house with frame rear wing added in the late 19th century; part of the Rochester MPS
111	Lucas Krom Stone House	Lucas Krom Stone House	August 10, 1995 (#95000953)	286 Whitfield Rd. 41°49′37″N 74°13′23″W	Rochester	part of the Rochester MPS
112	John A. Lafevre House and School	John A. Lafevre House and School	November 16, 1989 (#89002023)	NY 208, south of New Paltz; 41°41′50″N 74°07′09″W	Gardiner	Stone house built 1772 by New Paltz Huguenot descendant; one-room schoolhouse on property built 1838.
113	Charles D. & Elizabeth Lantry House	Charles D. & Elizabeth Lantry House	May 19, 2025 (#100011821)	111 Downs Street; 41°56′02″N 74°00′14″W	Kingston	
114	Lattingtown Baptist Church	Lattingtown Baptist Church	October 20, 2010 (#10000855)	425 Old Indian Road; 41°38′39″N 74°00′24″W	Lattingtown	
115	Lake Mohonk Mountain House Complex	Lake Mohonk Mountain House Complex	July 16, 1973 (#73001280)	Northwest of New Paltz, between Wallkill Valley on the east and Rondout Valley on the west 41°46′48″N 74°09′41″W	New Paltz	Architecturally eclectic ridgetop resort has been site of several important international conferences.
116	Abraham and Maria LeFevre House	Abraham and Maria LeFevre House	July 28, 2006 (#06000645)	56 Forest Glen Rd. 41°41′56″N 74°07′48″W	Gardiner	
117	Lock Tender's House and Canal Store Ruin	Lock Tender's House and Canal Store Ruin	August 6, 1998 (#98001010)	40 Canal Rd. 41°49′25″N 74°07′51″W	High Falls	1848 house for keeper of D&H Canal Lock 20 and contemporary foundation for canal store
118	Locust Lawn Estate	Locust Lawn Estate	May 17, 1974 (#74001313)	NY 32, southeast of Gardiner; 41°41′51″N 74°06′08″W	Gardiner	1814 Federal-style estate of Josiah Hasbrouck, descendant of the Huguenot Hasbroucks and U.S. Congressman
119	Loerzel Beer Hall	Loerzel Beer Hall	September 7, 1984 (#84003234)	213 Partition St. 42°04′29″N 73°57′04″W	Saugerties	1873 brewery now used as apartments
120	Main Street Historic District	Main Street Historic District	June 7, 1988 (#88000666)	US 209; 41°50′49″N 74°08′41″W	Stone Ridge	Late-18th- and early-19th-century houses and church.
121	Main-Partition Streets Historic District	Main-Partition Streets Historic District	July 8, 1982 (#82003411)	Roughly bounded by Main, Partition, Market and Jane Sts. 42°04′37″N 73°57′10″W	Saugerties	
122	Jacob F. Markle Stone House	Jacob F. Markle Stone House	August 10, 1995 (#95000948)	335 Whitfield Rd. 41°49′59″N 74°13′03″W	Rochester	part of the Rochester MPS
123	Maverick Concert Hall	Maverick Concert Hall	December 9, 1999 (#99001492)	Off Maverick Rd. 42°00′51″N 74°07′06″W	Hurley	
124	Middaugh-Stone House and Dutch Barn		December 29, 1994 (#94001514)	476 Mill Rd. 41°49′09″N 74°13′49″W	Rochester	
125	Mill Street Stone Arch Bridge	Mill Street Stone Arch Bridge	December 16, 1996 (#96001439)	Mill St., over Birch Cr. 42°08′01″N 74°29′00″W	Pine Hill	1897 bridge built by same builder as Elm Street bridge
126	Miller's House at Red Mills	Miller's House at Red Mills	September 26, 1983 (#83001819)	Red Mills Rd. and Wallkill Ave. 41°37′42″N 74°16′29″W	Shawangunk	part of the Shawangunk Valley MRA
127	Milton Railroad Station	Milton Railroad Station	August 28, 2007 (#07000873)	41 Dock Rd. 41°39′10″N 73°57′17″W	Milton	One of the few remaining passenger stations from the West Shore Railroad. Built in 1883; remains relatively intact today.
128	Morton Memorial Library	Morton Memorial Library	February 21, 1997 (#97000119)	Elm St., southwest of NY 28; 42°08′03″N 74°28′47″W	Pine Hill	1902 Georgian Revival library built by summer resident and local philanthropist
129	Mount Tremper Fire Observation Station	Mount Tremper Fire Observation Station	September 23, 2001 (#01001032)	Mount Tremper; 42°04′27″N 74°16′40″W	Shandaken	part of the Fire Observation Stations of New York State Forest Preserve MPS
130	National Youth Administration Woodstock Resident Work Center	National Youth Administration Woodstock Resident Work Center	April 30, 1992 (#92000455)	NY 212 north side, east of Woodstock; 42°02′25″N 74°05′39″W	Woodstock	Now Woodstock School of Art
131	New Paltz Downtown Historic District	New Paltz Downtown Historic District	July 24, 2009 (#09000561)	Main, N. Chestnut, S. Chestnut, Church, N. Front, Academy and W. Center Sts., Innis and Plattekill Aves. 41°44′53″N 74°05′06″W	New Paltz	Intact 19th-century core of funky college town
132	O&W Railroad Station at Port Ben	O&W Railroad Station at Port Ben	January 11, 2002 (#01001448)	Tow Path Rd. 41°45′00″N 74°20′50″W	Wawarsing	Abandoned 1912 passenger station and right-of-way of former track
133	Old Dutch Church Parsonage	Old Dutch Church Parsonage	August 15, 2001 (#01000845)	109 Pearl St. 41°55′51″N 74°01′16″W	Kingston	
134	Osterhoudt Stone House		July 5, 2001 (#01000717)	1880 NY 32; 42°01′03″N 73°57′32″W	Saugerties	
135	Olive and Hurley Old School Baptist Church	Olive and Hurley Old School Baptist Church	November 19, 1998 (#98001392)	NY 28, junction with NY 30; 41°58′24″N 74°12′45″W	Shokan	
136	Ontario and Western Railroad Passenger Station	Ontario and Western Railroad Passenger Station	February 22, 1999 (#99000086)	Institution Rd. 41°44′24″N 74°21′57″W	Napanoch	Intact 1903 train station next to D&H canal bed
137	Opus 40	Opus 40	March 12, 2001 (#01000238)	Fite Rd. 42°03′03″N 74°02′02″W	Saugerties	Environmental sculpture garden created by Bard College professor Harry Fite in the 1930s
138	Frank A. Palen House	Frank A. Palen House	February 9, 2005 (#05000015)	74-76 St. James St. 41°55′50″N 74°00′53″W	Kingston	Intact 1892 Queen Anne Style house of local businessman
139	Alton B. Parker Estate		August 23, 2016 (#16000558)	14 Lamont Landing Rd. 41°49′45″N 73°57′27″W	Esopus	1860 Italian-villa style estate, the culmination of a century of work, was home of 1904 Democratic presidential candidate
140	Col. Oliver Hazard Payne Estate	Col. Oliver Hazard Payne Estate	November 15, 2002 (#02001324)	US 9W; 41°48′35″N 73°57′34″W	Esopus	A boundary increase was approved January 19, 2024.
141	Pearl Street Schoolhouse	Pearl Street Schoolhouse	September 26, 1983 (#83001820)	Awosting and Decker Rds. 41°39′22″N 74°16′37″W	Shawangunk	Intact 1850 one-room schoolhouse, now used as house; part of the Shawangunk Valley MRA
142	Perrine's Bridge	Perrine's Bridge	April 13, 1973 (#73001281)	Off I-87 over Wallkill River; 41°48′53″N 74°03′13″W	Rosendale	Second-oldest covered bridge in New York and only one along the entire length of the Wallkill
143	Phoenicia Railroad Station	Phoenicia Railroad Station	April 20, 1995 (#95000474)	High St. 42°04′49″N 74°18′31″W	Phoenicia	Surviving Ulster and Delaware Railroad station from 1899 now home to Empire State Rail Museum
144	Pilgrim Furniture Company Factory	Pilgrim Furniture Company Factory	May 4, 2018 (#100002390)	2 S. Prospect Street; 41°55′33″N 74°00′26″W	Kingston	First factory built in city after World War II, with financing from federal program to make jobs available for returning veterans
145	Pine Hill Historic District	Pine Hill Historic District	August 14, 2012 (#12000513)	Main, Academy, Elm, & Mill Sts., Bonnieview Ave., Pine Hill, Salomone, Station, & Old Turnpike Rds. 42°07′58″N 74°28′49″W	Pine Hill	Core of 19th-century mountain resort town
146	Pine Street African Burial Ground		December 18, 2025 (#100012413)	Address Restricted	Kingston vicinity	
147	Ponckhockie Union Chapel	Ponckhockie Union Chapel	April 23, 1980 (#80002784)	91 Abruyn St. 41°55′34″N 73°58′28″W	Kingston	
148	Poppletown Farmhouse	Poppletown Farmhouse	November 7, 1991 (#91001656)	Junction of Old Post Rd. and Swarte Kill Rd. 41°49′16″N 73°58′31″W	Esopus	
149	Red Hill Fire Observation Station	Red Hill Fire Observation Station	September 23, 2001 (#01001030)	Red Hill; 41°55′25″N 74°31′04″W	Denning	Last Catskill fire tower still in use when it was closed in 1990 after 70 years; first one restored and reopened in the late 1990s. 1931 observer's cabin is one of the oldest extant in New York. Part of the Fire Observation Stations of New York State Forest Preserve MPS
150	Reformed Church of Shawangunk Complex	Reformed Church of Shawangunk Complex	June 3, 1982 (#82003408)	Hoagerburgh Rd. 41°39′12″N 74°12′52″W	Shawangunk	Mid-18th-century stone church is oldest building in continuous use by American Dutch Reformed Church congregation
151	Reformed Dutch Church of New Hurley	Reformed Dutch Church of New Hurley	November 10, 1982 (#82001273)	North of Wallkill on NY 208; 41°38′18″N 74°08′37″W	Wallkill	1820s Greek Revival church replaced one of the first churches built in county
152	Reformed Protestant Dutch Church of Klyne Esopus	Reformed Protestant Dutch Church of Klyne Esopus	November 15, 2002 (#02001321)	764 US 9W; 41°51′14″N 73°58′10″W	Esopus	
153	Rest Plaus Historic District		June 1, 1995 (#95000602)	Roughly, along Old Kings Hwy., Rest Plaus Rd. and Lucas Tpk. (Co. Rt. 1); 41°49′12″N 74°09′52″W	Marbletown	
154	Johannes Rider Stone House	Johannes Rider Stone House	August 10, 1995 (#95000956)	7 Upper Whitfield Rd. 41°49′33″N 74°13′26″W	Rochester	part of the Rochester MPS
155	William H. and Mary M. Romeyn House	William H. and Mary M. Romeyn House	March 5, 2024 (#100009877)	52 St. James Street; 41°55′53″N 74°00′48″W	Kingston	
156	Rondout–West Strand Historic District	Rondout–West Strand Historic District	August 24, 1979 (#79001641)	Roughly bounded by Broadway, Rondout Creek, Ravine, Hone and McEntee Sts. 41°55′04″N 73°59′18″W	Kingston	Former village of Rondout and port area at northern terminus of D&H Canal preserved and restored after nearby bridge resulted in some other demolitions; now a popular nightlife and shopping area.
157	Roosa House		July 11, 2025 (#100011986)	882 Berme Road; 41°48′48″N 74°09′03″W	Marbletown	
158	Sahler Stone House	Sahler Stone House	August 12, 1999 (#99000992)	Kyserike Rd. 41°49′09″N 74°11′17″W	Rochester	part of the Rochester MPS
159	Sahler Stone House and Dutch Barn	Sahler Stone House and Dutch Barn	August 12, 1999 (#99000998)	Winfield Rd. 41°49′33″N 74°11′52″W	Rochester	part of the Rochester MPS
160	J. Sahler House		May 1, 2000 (#97000118)	US 209, southwest of the junction with County Road 63; 41°49′28″N 74°11′27″W	Rochester	part of the Rochester MPS
161	St. Joseph's Parish Complex	St. Joseph's Parish Complex	May 10, 2024 (#100010266)	Roughly bounded by Wall Street, Main Street, and Pearl Street; 41°55′55″N 74°01′08″W	Kingston	
162	Saugerties Lighthouse	Saugerties Lighthouse	May 29, 1979 (#79001642)	Hudson River at Esopus Creek; 42°04′19″N 73°55′49″W	Saugerties	1869 lighthouse on the Hudson River, no longer in use; part of the Hudson River Lighthouses TR
163	Saugerties and New York Steamboat Company Warehouses	Saugerties and New York Steamboat Company Warehouses	November 9, 2017 (#100001812)	2 Ferry St. 42°04′13″N 73°56′38″W	Saugerties	Pair of brick structures built in late 1870s are remnant of once-thriving Hudson River transportation industry
164	Augusta Savage House and Studio		March 21, 2001 (#01000248)	189 Old Rte. 32; 42°06′45″N 73°58′36″W	Saugerties	
165	Schoonmaker Stone House and Farm	Schoonmaker Stone House and Farm	February 21, 1997 (#97000109)	Samsonville Rd., near the junction of NY 76 and Cherrytown Rd. 41°47′46″N 74°18′44″W	Rochester	part of the Rochester MPS
166	Joachim Schoonmaker Farm	Joachim Schoonmaker Farm	May 8, 2013 (#13000244)	41 Garden Ln. 41°47′08″N 74°12′48″W	Accord	Farm owned by same family since the 18th century; part of Rochester MPS
167	C. K. Schoonmaker Stone House	C. K. Schoonmaker Stone House	February 21, 1997 (#97000107)	294 Queens Hwy. 41°48′33″N 74°16′13″W	Rochester	Well-preserved early-19th-century stone bank house; part of the Rochester MPS
168	Second Reformed Dutch Church of Kingston	Second Reformed Dutch Church of Kingston	December 28, 2001 (#01001393)	213-223 Fair St. 41°55′53″N 74°01′05″W	Kingston	
169	Senate House	Senate House	August 12, 1971 (#71000564)	Northwest side of Clinton Ave. near the junction with N. Front St. 41°56′06″N 74°01′09″W	Kingston	First meeting place of New York State Senate in 1777. First building in Kingston listed.
170	Shady Brook Farm	Shady Brook Farm	November 21, 2012 (#12000961)	351 Old Post Road; 41°35′38″N 73°58′16″W	Marlboro vicinity	
171	Sharp Burial Ground	Sharp Burial Ground	November 15, 2002 (#02001320)	Albany Ave. 41°56′18″N 74°00′11″W	Kingston	Intact second-generation burying ground with some excellent early-19th-century funerary art; part of the Albany Avenue, Kingston, Ulster County, New York MPS
172	Shuart-Van Orden Stone House	Shuart-Van Orden Stone House	November 22, 1995 (#95001335)	41 Allhusen Rd. 41°40′55″N 74°05′51″W	Plattekill	Built in 1772 and heavily modified since, this is one of the oldest houses in Plattekill
173	George J. Smith House	George J. Smith House	November 15, 2002 (#02001316)	109 Albany Ave. 41°55′58″N 74°00′41″W	Kingston	1885 Queen Anne house of area congressman; part of the Albany Avenue, Kingston, Ulster County, New York MPS
174	John Smith House	John Smith House	November 15, 2002 (#02001315)	103 Albany Ave. 41°55′58″N 74°00′42″W	Kingston	Intact 1860s Italianate house; part of the Albany Avenue, Kingston, Ulster County, New York MPS
175	Snyder Estate Natural Cement Historic District	Snyder Estate Natural Cement Historic District	June 9, 1992 (#92000695)	NY 213, 0.5 miles (0.80 km) west of Rosendale; 41°50′50″N 74°05′44″W	Rosendale	275-acre (111 ha) tract with many plants, mines and other infrastructure used in the production of Rosendale cement, as well as homes of the Snyder family dating to 1809.
176	Spring Glen Synagogue	Spring Glen Synagogue	January 15, 1999 (#98001622)	Old US 209; 41°39′59″N 74°25′49″W	Spring Glen	Early-20th-century synagogue built by first wave of Jews settling in the Catskills
177	Stilwell Stone House	Stilwell Stone House	August 12, 1999 (#99000996)	189 Old Kings Highway; 41°48′40″N 74°11′19″W	Rochester	part of the Rochester MPS
178	Stilwill-Westbrook Stone House	Stilwill-Westbrook Stone House	August 12, 1999 (#99000997)	482 Old Kings Highway; 41°48′25″N 74°11′43″W	Rochester	part of the Rochester MPS
179	Benjamin Ten Broeck House	Benjamin Ten Broeck House	December 7, 2005 (#05001395)	1019 Flatbush Rd. 41°58′36″N 73°58′15″W	Kingston	Tenant house built in three stages from the 1750s to 1770s is only remnant of Ten Broeck estate north of Kingston
180	Jacob Ten Broeck Stone House	Jacob Ten Broeck Stone House	November 15, 2002 (#02001312)	169 Albany Ave. 41°56′00″N 74°00′34″W	Kingston	1803 stone house expanded and renovated later in the 19th century; part of the Albany Avenue, Kingston, Ulster County, New York MPS
181	Terwilliger House	Terwilliger House	September 26, 1983 (#83001821)	Hoagerburgh Rd. 41°38′59″N 74°12′19″W	Shawangunk	Early-19th-century Federal-style stone house; part of the Shawangunk Valley MRA
182	Terwilliger-Smith Farm	Terwilliger-Smith Farm	December 31, 2002 (#02001658)	160 Cherrytown Rd. 41°47′45″N 74°19′05″W	Rochester	Rare surviving complete farmstead in county from 19th and early 20th centuries
183	The Locusts	The Locusts	December 16, 1996 (#96001440)	160 Plains Rd. 41°43′46″N 74°06′10″W	New Paltz	1826 brick farmhouse was first major house in New Paltz area to be built of brick rather than stone, reflecting abandonment of Dutch and Belgian-style stone houses
184	Trapps Mountain Hamlet Historic District	Trapps Mountain Hamlet Historic District	November 2, 2000 (#00001275)	Off NY 44/55; 41°44′00″N 74°12′51″W	Gardiner	Remains of abandoned 1797–1940s community on Shawangunk Ridge
185	Trinity Episcopal Church Complex	Trinity Episcopal Church Complex	August 6, 1998 (#98001006)	Junction of Church St. and Barclay St. 42°04′04″N 73°56′55″W	Saugerties	
186	John H. and Sarah Trumbull House	John H. and Sarah Trumbull House	February 2, 2018 (#100002083)	80 Marius St. 41°55′27″N 74°01′01″W	Kingston	Arthur Crooks-designed 1876 Victorian house for socially prominent local couple, later home to avant-garde artist Maryanne Amacher
187	Trumpbour Homestead Farm		September 19, 1985 (#85002422)	1789 Old Kings Hwy. 42°08′23″N 73°57′00″W	Saugerties	
188	Tuthilltown Gristmill	Tuthilltown Gristmill	June 14, 1982 (#82003409)	Albany Post Rd. 41°41′12″N 74°10′32″W	Gardiner	Was oldest continuously operating gristmill in New York State until the early 2000s
189	Ulster Heights Synagogue	Ulster Heights Synagogue	February 19, 2001 (#01000045)	Ulster Heights Rd and Beaver Dam Rd. 41°46′48″N 74°31′04″W	Ulster Heights	Knesset Israel congregation built 1924 by early Jewish settlers in Catskills; still used on High Holy Days
190	Ulster House Hotel	Ulster House Hotel	November 21, 2002 (#02001399)	Main St. at Academy Rd. 42°08′00″N 74°28′54″W	Pine Hill	1882 Italianate building is rare surviving wood frame hotel from peak Catskill resort era
191	United States Lace Curtain Mills	United States Lace Curtain Mills	March 20, 2013 (#13000100)	165 Cornell St. 41°56′05″N 74°00′03″W	Kingston	
192	US Post Office-Ellenville	US Post Office-Ellenville	November 17, 1988 (#88002496)	1 Liberty St. 41°43′03″N 74°23′35″W	Ellenville	Franklin D. Roosevelt personally approved design after residents complained to him about proposed brick building
193	Benjamin Van Keuren House Ruin	Benjamin Van Keuren House Ruin	November 22, 2000 (#00001424)	Off of Bruyn Turnpike; 41°38′39″N 74°18′39″W	Shawangunk	Site of 1745 home of Van Keuren, early settler and Revolutionary War veteran who served four terms as supervisor
194	Tobias Van Steenburgh House	Tobias Van Steenburgh House	December 9, 1999 (#99001493)	93 Wall St. 41°55′37″N 74°00′59″W	Kingston	Stone house built ca. 1700 is one of few in city not burned by British in 1777
195	Van Wagenen Stone House and Farm Complex		August 12, 1999 (#99000994)	2732 Lucas Turnpike; 41°48′20″N 74°10′56″W	Rochester	part of the Rochester MPS
196	Jacobus Van Wagenen Stone House	Jacobus Van Wagenen Stone House	August 12, 1999 (#99000999)	2659 Lucas Turnpike; 41°48′15″N 74°10′39″W	Rochester	part of the Rochester MPS
197	Vernooy–Bevier Stone House and Barns		May 4, 2018 (#100002365)	7075 US 209; 41°45′33″N 74°21′11″W	Wawarsing	Early 18th-century stone house with 19th-century farm buildings
198	Vosburg Turning Mill Complex	Vosburg Turning Mill Complex	October 10, 2002 (#02001120)	52 Hutchin Hill Rd. 42°04′13″N 74°13′55″W	Woodstock	
199	West Strand Historic District	West Strand Historic District	June 28, 1974 (#74001314)	West Strand and Broadway; 41°55′04″N 73°59′01″W	Kingston	
200	Dirck Westbrook Stone House	Dirck Westbrook Stone House	August 10, 1995 (#95000949)	18 Old Whitfield Rd. 41°48′22″N 74°13′17″W	Rochester	1709 stone house now rear wing on early-19th-century Greek Revival front; part of the Rochester MPS
201	Wilbur Historic District	Wilbur Historic District	September 2, 2026 (#100013357)	The district is bounded by: 14-34 Davis St. (even nos.) and 26 Wilbur Ave.; 534-572 Abeel St. and 543-613 Abeel St. (odd nos.); 613 Abeel St., 35 Duflon St. and 41 Burnett St.; and 19, 29 and 41 Burnett St. and Wilbur, Dunn, and Davis Sts. 41°54′35″N 74°00′15″W	Kingston	
202	Winfield Corners Stone House	Winfield Corners Stone House	August 12, 1999 (#99000993)	Winfield Rd. 41°49′20″N 74°11′43″W	Rochester	part of the Rochester MPS
203	Woodstock Artists Association	Woodstock Artists Association	April 28, 2022 (#100007685)	28 Tinker St. 42°02′27″N 74°07′09″W	Woodstock	
204	Wynkoop House	Wynkoop House	September 7, 1984 (#84003237)	NY 32; 42°05′16″N 73°58′29″W	Saugerties	Intact 1730s long Dutch stone house
205	Cornelius Wynkoop Stone House	Cornelius Wynkoop Stone House	February 23, 1996 (#96000138)	US 209; 41°50′51″N 74°08′33″W	Marbletown	George Washington was an overnight guest in this 1770s Georgian stone house that has been used as a backdrop in contemporary clothing catalogs.
206	Moses Yeomans House	Moses Yeomans House	February 20, 2009 (#09000041)	252-278 Delaware Ave. 41°55′41″N 73°58′23″W	Kingston	
207	Anthony Yelverton House	Anthony Yelverton House	September 22, 1983 (#83001823)	39 Maple Ave. 41°43′01″N 73°57′05″W	Highland	

== Former listing ==
	Name on the Register	Image	Date listed	Date removed	Location	City or town	Description
1	Van Vleck House		September 26, 1983 (#83001822)	December 27, 1993	Bruynswick Road	Gardiner	

== See also ==
- National Register of Historic Places listings in New York
