= Van Wagenen =

Van Wagenen is a surname. Notable people with the surname include:

- Avis Stearns Van Wagenen (1841–1907), American businesswoman
- Gertrude Van Wagenen, (1893–1978), an American doctor
- Brodie Van Wagenen (born 1974), American sports agent and executive
- Sterling Van Wagenen (born 1947), American film and stage producer, writer and director
- Jeff Van Wagenen (born 1948), American professional golfer

== See also ==
- Van Wagenen House, historic house in Jersey City, New Jersey, United States
- Jacobus Van Wagenen Stone House, historic house in Ulster County, New York, United States
- Van Wagenen Stone House and Farm Complex, historic house in Ulster County, New York, United States
