= Terwilliger =

Terwilliger can refer to:

== People and fictional characters ==
- Brian J. Terwilliger (born 1976), movie director
- G. Zachary Terwilliger (born 1981), former United States Attorney for the Eastern District of Virginia
- George J. Terwilliger III (born 1950), former United States Deputy Attorney General
- George Terwilliger (1882–1970), American silent film director and screenwriter
- James Terwilliger (1809–1892), Oregon pioneer
- Joseph Terwilliger, American geneticist
- Robert Underdunk Terwilliger Jr. or Sideshow Bob, a fictional character from The Simpsons
- Ron Terwilliger (born 1941), American housing developer
- Wayne Terwilliger (1925–2021), American baseball player, second baseman in Major League Baseball

== Places in the United States ==
- Terwilliger, Portland, Oregon, a neighborhood
- Terwilliger Boulevard, a major road and parkway in Portland, Oregon
- Cougar Hot Springs, also known as Terwilliger Hot Springs, geothermal pools in Oregon

== Buildings in the United States ==
- Terwilliger House, Registered Historic Place in McHenry County, Illinois
- Terwilliger House (Shawangunk, New York), a Federal style stone house built around the turn of the 18th century
- Terwilliger Brothers Field at Max Bishop Stadium, a baseball stadium at the United States Naval Academy, Annapolis, Maryland
