= Palen =

Palen or Palén is a surname. Notable people with the surname include:

- Anna von Palen (1875–1939), German actress
- Cole Palen (1925–1993), American flier & collector
- Fyodor Palen (1780–1863), Russian diplomat and administrator
- Paul Palén (1881–1944), Swedish shooter
- Rufus Palen (1807–1844), American politician
- Tim Palen, American motion picture marketing executive and photographer

== See also ==
- Palen Mountains, northern Colorado Desert, California, USA
- Palen Creek Correctional Centre, about 100 km south west of Brisbane
- Frank A. Palen House, historic home located at Kingston in Ulster County, New York
- Frederic Palen Schoonmaker (1870–1945), United States federal judge
- Palin
- Pahlen
