= Moses Yeomans House =

Historic american house

- U.S. National Register of Historic Places
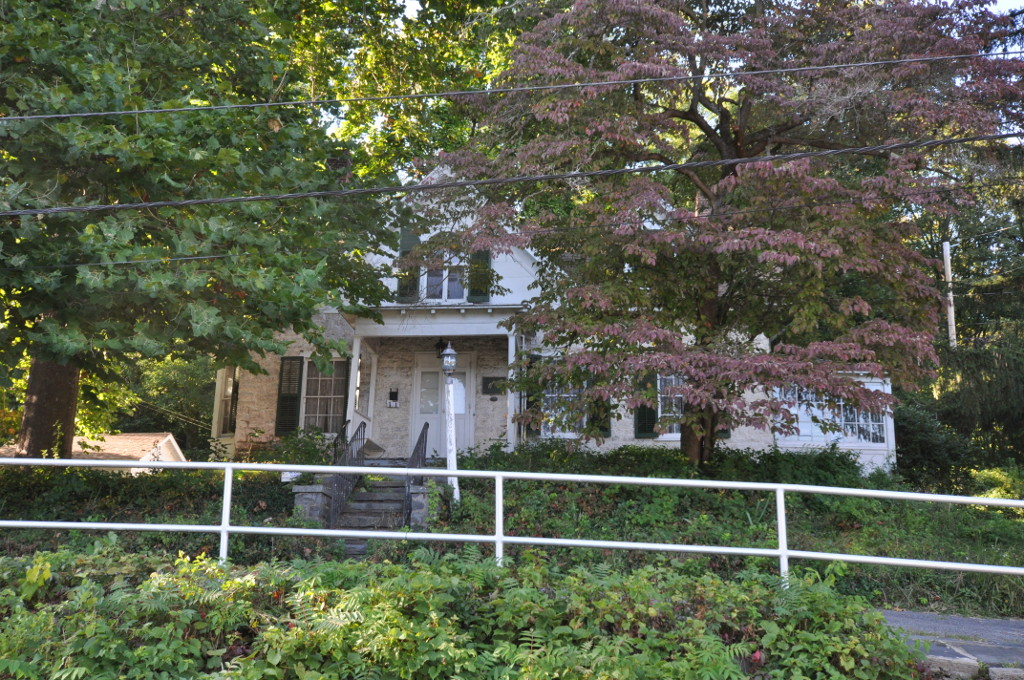

- Location within New York Location within the United States
- Location: 252-278 Delaware Ave., Kingston, New York
- Coordinates: 41°55′41.12″N 73°58′23.39″W
- Area: 3.44 acres (1.39 ha)
- Architectural style: Dutch Colonial
- NRHP reference No.: 09000041
- Added to NRHP: February 20, 2009

Moses Yeomans House is a historic home located at Kingston in Ulster County, New York. The house is a 1 1/2-story, pre-Revolutionary War, Dutch Colonial–style stone dwelling with modifications made in the late 19th and early 20th centuries. Also on the property is a 19th-century barn, 19th-century shed, early patent marker stone, fieldstone marker, and stone slab. The property also includes mill ruins, that were once part of the Cordts Mansion property.

It was listed on the National Register of Historic Places in 2009.
