= Krom Stone House at 45 Upper Whitfield Road =

Historic house in New York, United States

- U.S. National Register of Historic Places
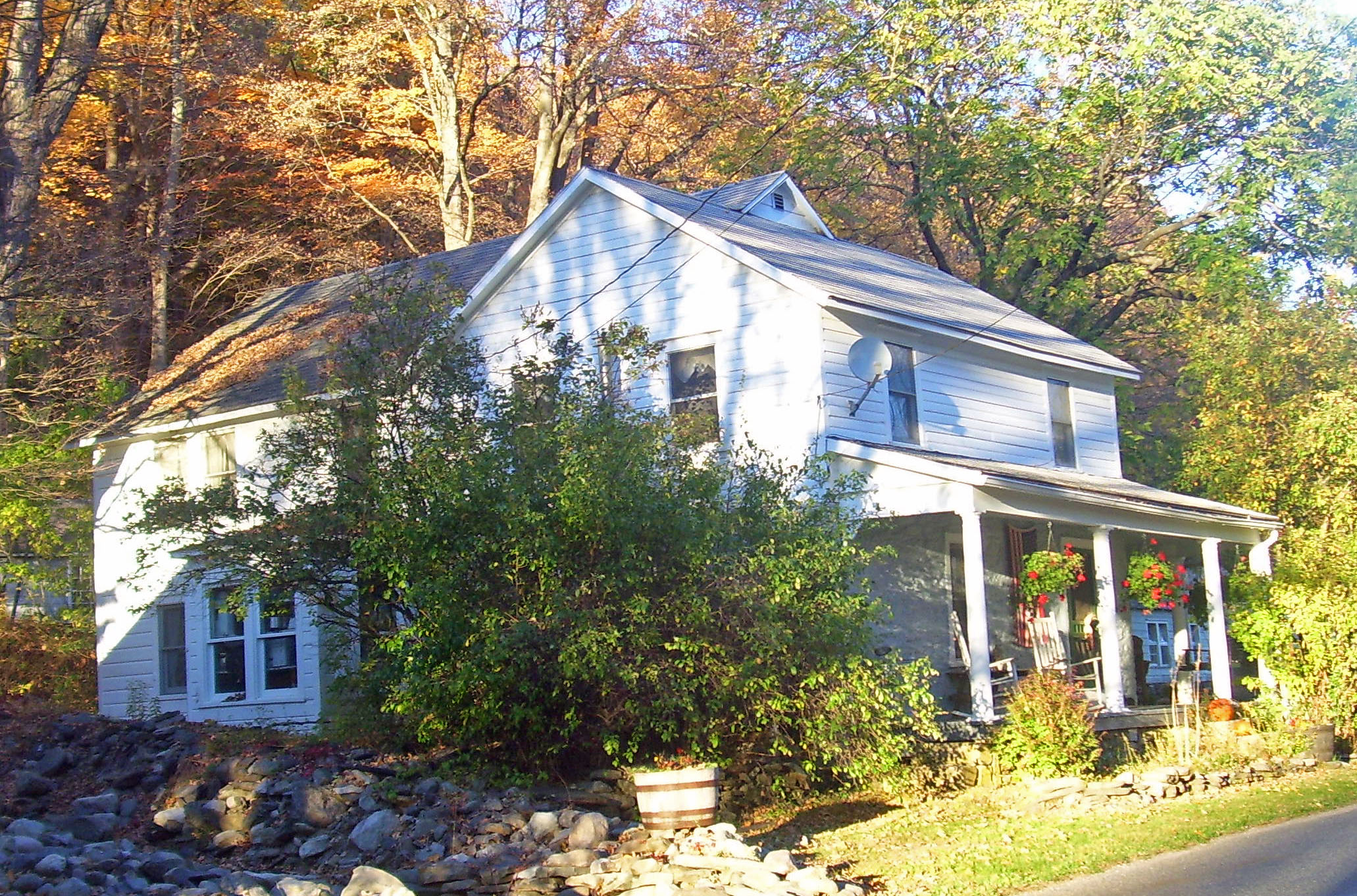
- West profile and south elevation, 2008

- Location within New York Location within the United States
- Location: Kerhonkson, NY
- Nearest city: Kingston
- Coordinates: 41°49′42″N 74°13′53″W
- Area: 8.1 acres (3.3 ha)
- Built: 1780
- MPS: Rochester MPS
- NRHP reference No.: 95000950
- Added to NRHP: August 10, 1995

The Krom Stone House at 45 Upper Whitfield Road in the Ulster County Town of Rochester, New York, United States, is one of several houses associated with that family. It was built somewhere between 1680 and 1720.

A frame wing added over a century later, along with clapboard siding over the original home. In 1995 it was listed on the National Register of Historic Places.

== Building ==
The house is located on an irregularly shaped 8.1-acre (3.3 ha) lot on the north side of Upper Whitfield Road, a half-mile (1 km) west of Accord Speedway and 500 feet (150 m) west of another Krom stone house. The area is mostly wooded, as the land begins to rise into the Catskill Mountains to the west. There are some small clearings nearby for other houses. A small stream, its channel lined in stone, flows to the west of the house.

To the west of the house is a modern frame hip roofed garage with drop siding. Scattered behind the house to the north and east are four chicken coops, one story shed-roofed frame buildings. None of these are considered contributing resources to the property's historic character.

The house itself has a two-bay two-story fieldstone main block with side-gabled roof shingled in asphalt. The upper story has been sided in clapboard to match the two-story frame rear wing. The exposed fieldstone has been painted white as well.

A shed-roofed porch with stone deck supported by four round columns runs the full width of the south (front) elevation on the first story and wraps around to the east. That gable end has a picture window with an art-glass top. A satellite dish projects from the southwest corner of the second story.

The rear wing was built so its east wall is continuous with that of the original block, giving the current house a rough "L" shape. Its west side has a semi-hexagonal projecting bay window overlooking the stream. An exterior chimney rises up the north end of the wing. At the southeast corner of the wing is the house's secondary entrance.

== History ==
The original house is believed to have been built between 1680 and 1720. At that time it was a simple one-and-half-story stone house. In 1890 that block was raised an additional story and the rear wing put on, both using timber instead of stone. The garage and chicken coops were added in the 20th century.

== See also ==
- National Register of Historic Places listings in Ulster County, New York
