= Fitch Bluestone Company Office =

- U.S. National Register of Historic Places
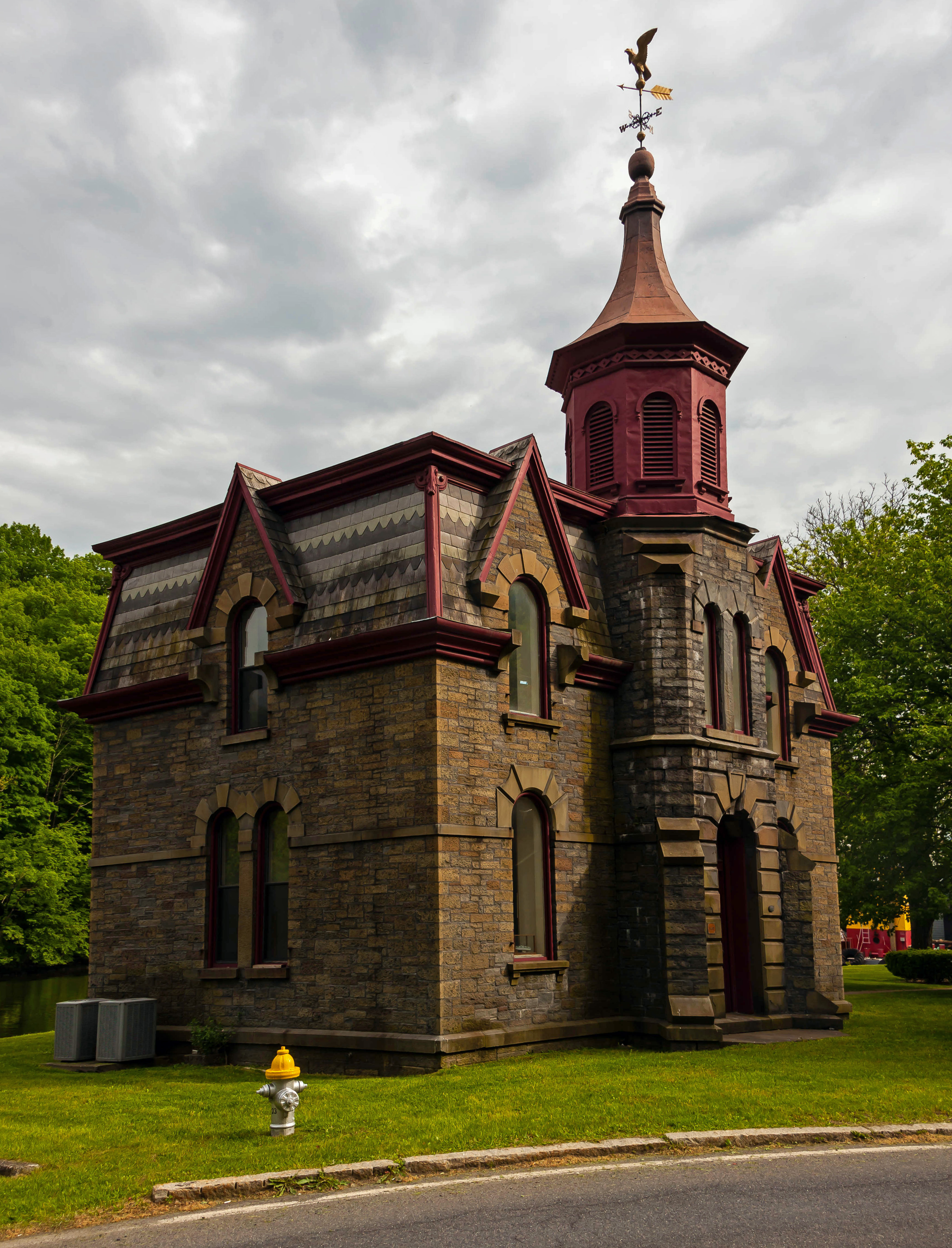

- Location within New York
- Location: 532-574 Abeel Street, Kingston NY
- Coordinates: 41.9097°N 74.0026°W
- Built: 1870
- Architect: J. A. Wood.
- Architectural style: Bluestone
- NRHP reference No.: 16000256
- Added to NRHP: 5/16/2016

Fitch Bluestone Company Office is a historic American office building located on Abeel Street in Kingston, New York, just yards away from the Rondout Creek. Built for Ezra Fitch and Company in 1870, it is remarkable for the heavy use of bluestone in its architecture, as well as its involvement in the bluestone industry in Ulster County in the mid to late 19th century.

== Building ==
The Fitch Company office contains two stories built atop a stone foundation. Its walls make heavy use of bluestone. The building is further adorned with assorted styles of windows and other accents.

== History ==
Ezra Fitch and Company was born when Ezra Fitch rose to the head of his family's shipping company, Fitch and Reed. Under his control, the company pivoted to handling bluestone, subsequently flourished in this new industry, and before long employed over a thousand personnel. It was in the course of this growth that the Fitch Bluestone Company Office was built. The large growth of the company was also instrumental in developing the Village of Wilbur. Also known as the S. & W. B. Fitch Depot & Office Building for Simeon Fitch and William B. Fitch, it was restored in 1972.

== See also ==
- National Register of Historic Places listings in Ulster County, New York
