= K. Whittelsey =

- K. Whittelsey (Tugboat)
- U.S. National Register of Historic Places
- Location within New York Location within the United States
- Location: 3 North St. at Rondout Creek, Kingston, New York
- Coordinates: 41°55′20″N 73°58′13″W
- Area: less than one acre
- Built: 1930
- Built by: Spedden Shipbuilders
- Architectural style: tugboat
- NRHP reference No.: 02001395
- Added to NRHP: November 21, 2002

K. Whittelsey was a historic tugboat, last located at Kingston, Ulster County, New York. She was built in 1930, and was a 185 gross ton diesel tugboat measuring 90 feet, 6 inches, long. She was built by Spedden Shipbuilders of Baltimore, Maryland and towed oil barges.

It was added to the National Register of Historic Places in 2002. She was scrapped in 2008.
