= J. Sahler House =

Historic house in New York, United States

- U.S. National Register of Historic Places
- Location within New York Location within the United States
- Location: NY 209, SW of jct. with Co. Rd. 63, Rochester, New York
- Coordinates: 41°49′28″N 74°11′27″W
- Area: 1.3 acres (0.53 ha)
- Built: 1807
- Architectural style: Federal
- MPS: Rochester MPS
- NRHP reference No.: 97000118
- Added to NRHP: May 1, 2000

J. Sahler House, also known as Elm Rock, is a historic home located at Rochester in Ulster County, New York. It is a 1 1/2-story, Federal-style brick house built about 1807. Also on the property is a small barn.

It was listed on the National Register of Historic Places in 2000.
