= Lucas Krom Stone House =

Historic house in New York, United States

- U.S. National Register of Historic Places
- Lucas Krom Stone House, September 2012

- Location within New York Location within the United States
- Location: 286 Whitfield Rd., Rochester, New York
- Coordinates: 41°49′37″N 74°13′23″W
- Area: 7 acres (2.8 ha)
- Built: c. 1760
- MPS: Rochester MPS
- NRHP reference No.: 95000953
- Added to NRHP: August 10, 1995

Lucas Krom Stone House is a historic home located at Rochester in Ulster County, New York. The property includes the house (c. 1760), Dutch barn (c. 1800), and smokehouse (c. 1890). The house is a linear 1 1/2-story stone dwelling built in two sections. In the rear is a two-story frame ell.

It was listed on the National Register of Historic Places in 1995.
