= National Youth Administration Woodstock Resident Work Center =

- U.S. National Register of Historic Places
- U.S. Historic district
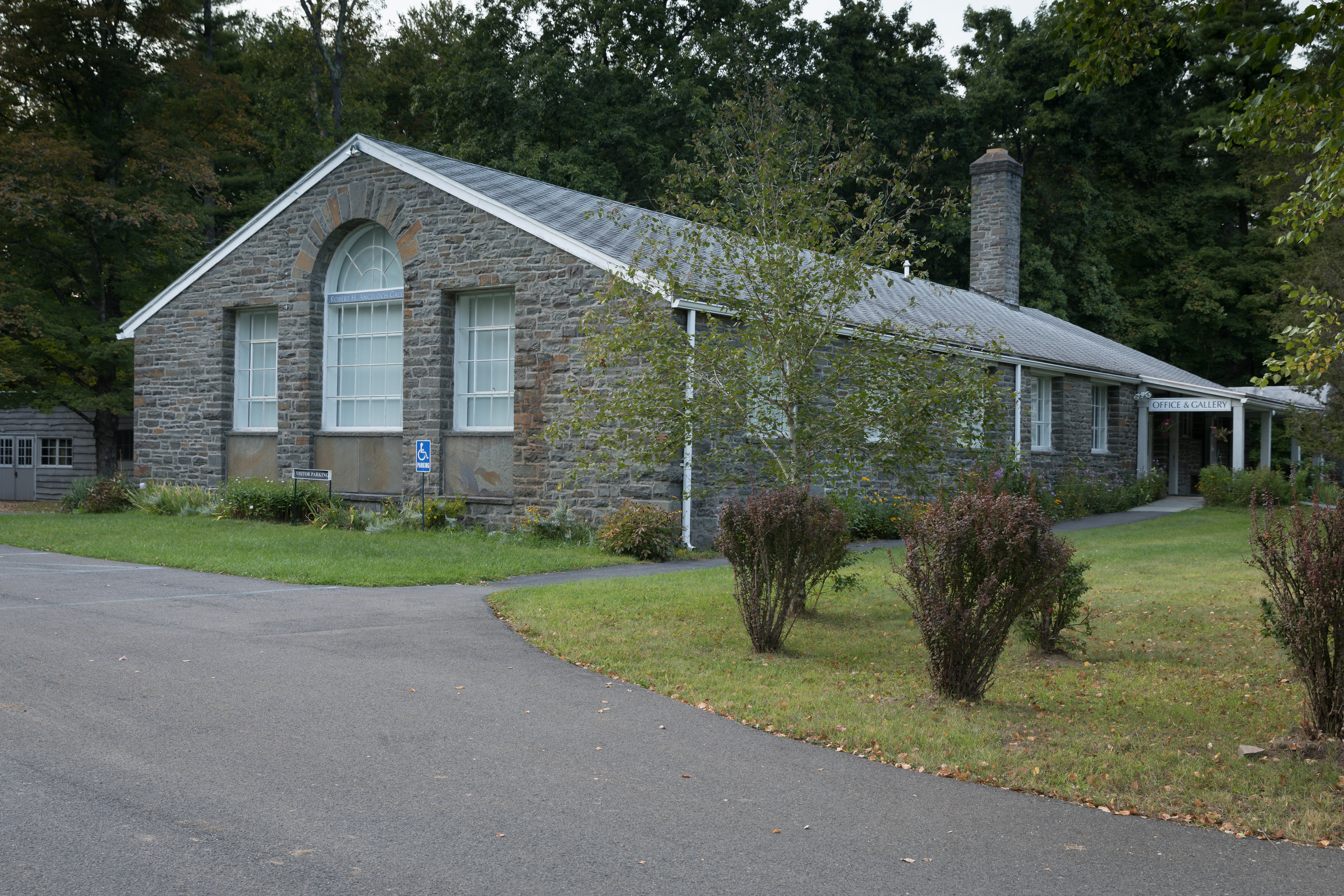
- The main building as seen from the driveway

- Location within New York Location within the United States
- Nearest city: Woodstock, New York
- Coordinates: 42°2′25″N 74°5′39″W
- Area: 5 acres (2.0 ha)
- Built: 1939
- NRHP reference No.: 92000455
- Added to NRHP: April 30, 1992

National Youth Administration Woodstock Resident Work Center is a national historic district located at Woodstock in Ulster County, New York. The district includes seven contributing buildings and three contributing structures. It includes three shop buildings, four shed buildings, a ca. 1900 barn, and a decorative flagpole base. It was built in 1939 by the National Youth Administration and operated until 1942 as a facility devoted to training youths in the industrial arts. The camp is currently used by the Woodstock School of Art.

It was listed on the National Register of Historic Places in 1992.
