= Ponckhockie Union Chapel =

- U.S. National Register of Historic Places
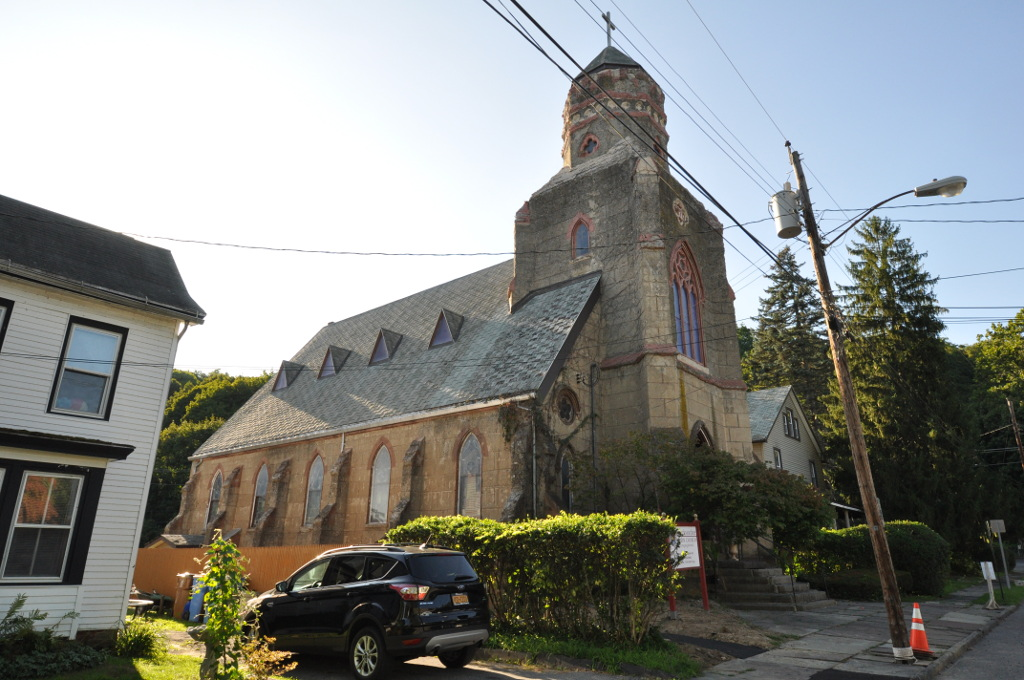

- Location within New York Location within the United States
- Location: 91 Abruyn St., Kingston, New York
- Coordinates: 41°55′34″N 73°58′28″W
- Area: less than one acre
- Built: 1870
- Architectural style: Gothic
- NRHP reference No.: 80002784
- Added to NRHP: April 23, 1980

Ponckhockie Union Chapel is a historic chapel at 91 Abruyn Street in Kingston, New York. It was built in 1870, and is a rectangular, Gothic Revival style poured reinforced concrete structure coated in stucco. It is three bays wide and five bays deep, and features a projecting bell tower topped by a truncated spire.

It was added to the National Register of Historic Places in 1980.
