= Schoonmaker Stone House and Farm =

Historic house in New York, United States

- U.S. National Register of Historic Places
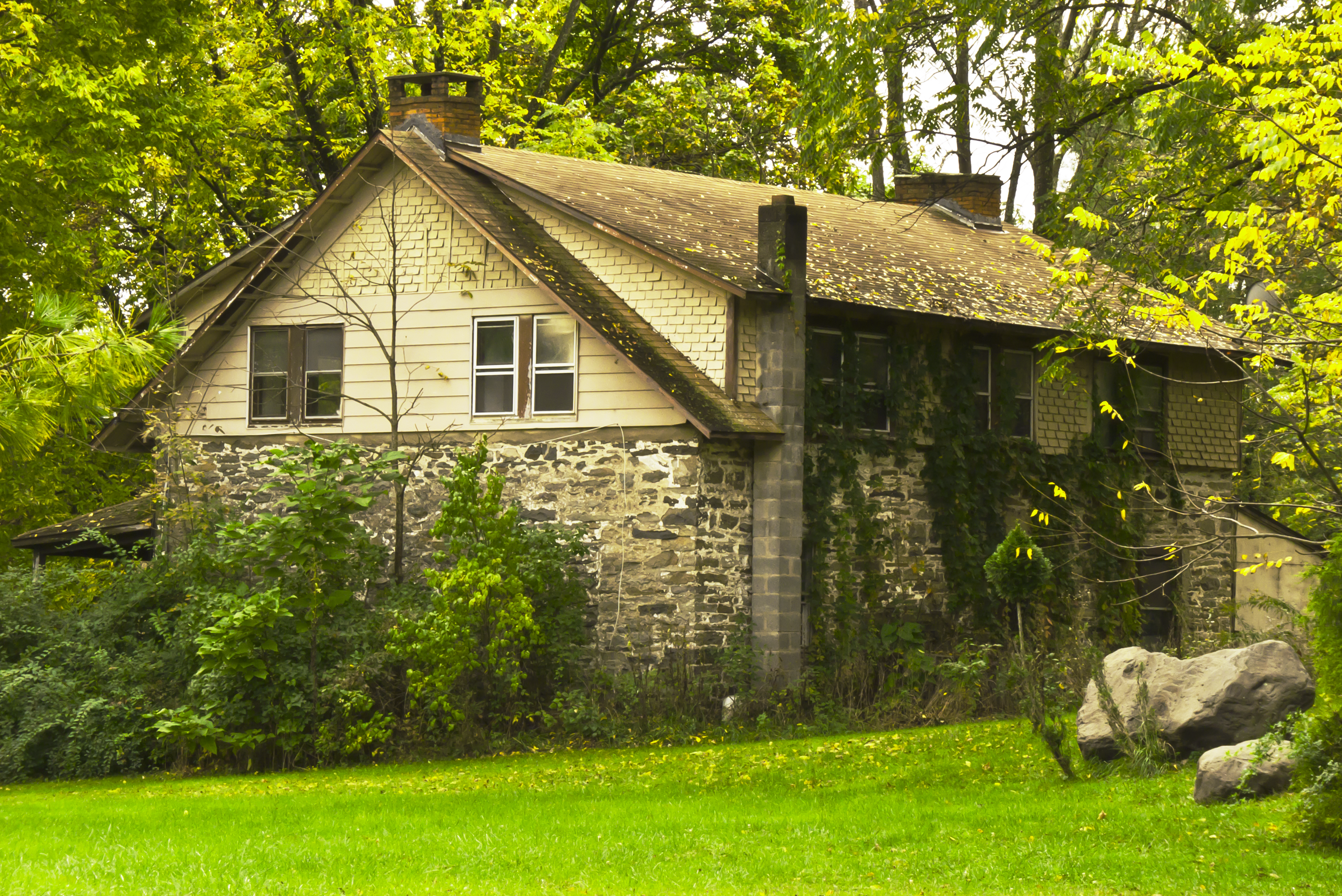
- Schoonmaker Stone House, September 2012

- Location within New York Location within the United States
- Location: Samsonville Rd., near jct. of NY 76 and Cherrytown Rd., Rochester, New York
- Coordinates: 41°47′46″N 74°18′44″W
- Area: 90 acres (36 ha)
- Built: 1820
- Architectural style: Federal
- MPS: Rochester MPS
- NRHP reference No.: 97000109
- Added to NRHP: February 21, 1997

Schoonmaker Stone House and Farm is a historic home and farm complex located at Rochester in Ulster County, New York. The property includes the house, a small shed (ca. 1880), privy (ca. 1880), and two barns. The house is a late 18th-century or early 19th-century, two-story gable-end stone house built in a simple Adamesque style.

It was listed on the National Register of Historic Places in 1997.
