= Stilwill-Westbrook Stone House =

Historic house in New York, United States

- U.S. National Register of Historic Places
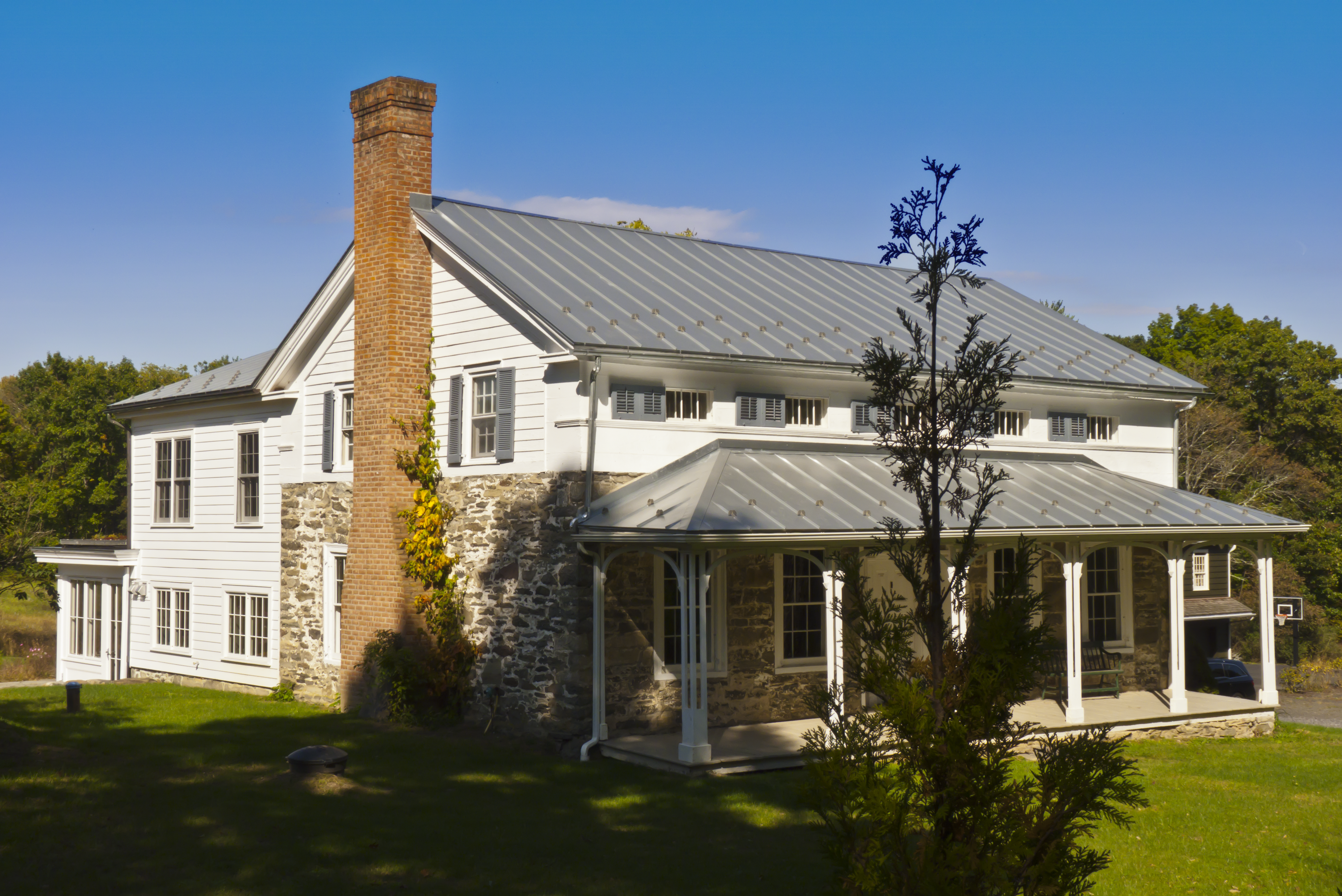
- Stilwill-Westbrook Stone House, September 2012

- Location within New York Location within the United States
- Location: 482 Old Kings Highway, Rochester, New York
- Coordinates: 41°48′25″N 74°11′43″W
- Area: 20.5 acres (8.3 ha)
- Built: 1750
- Architectural style: Colonial, Greek Revival
- MPS: Rochester MPS
- NRHP reference No.: 99000997
- Added to NRHP: August 12, 1999

Stilwell-Westbrook Stone House is a historic home located at Rochester in Ulster County, New York. It is a 1 1/2-story, five-bay stone dwelling built about 1750. Changes in the early 19th century added Greek Revival details. Also on the property is a large privy dated to about 1880.

It was listed on the National Register of Historic Places in 1999.
