= Van Vleck House =

- Formerly listed on the U.S. National Register of Historic Places
- Location within New York
- Location: Bruynswick Rd., Gardiner, New York
- Coordinates: 41°40′15″N 74°13′14″W
- Area: 21.3 acres (8.6 ha)
- Built: ca. 1820, ca. 1900
- Architectural style: Federal
- MPS: Shawangunk Valley MRA
- NRHP reference No.: 83001822

Significant dates
- Added to NRHP: September 26, 1983
- Removed from NRHP: December 27, 1993

The Van Vleck House was a historic home located at Gardiner, New York. The main block was built about 1820, and was a two story, three-bay frame with a gable roof with overhanging eaves. It had a wing added about 1900.

It was added to the National Register of Historic Places in 1983, and delisted in 1993, based on a significant loss of integrity and historic fabric.
