= Sahler Stone House and Dutch Barn =

Historic house in New York, United States

- U.S. National Register of Historic Places
- Sahler Stone House and Dutch Barn, September 2012

- Location within New York Location within the United States
- Location: Winfield Rd., Rochester, New York
- Coordinates: 41°49′33″N 74°11′52″W
- Area: 150 acres (61 ha)
- Built: 1780
- Architectural style: Colonial, Federal
- MPS: Rochester MPS
- NRHP reference No.: 99000998
- Added to NRHP: August 12, 1999

Sahler Stone House and Dutch Barn is a historic home and Dutch barn located at Rochester in Ulster County, New York. The house was built about 1780 and is a five-bay, 1 1/2-story linear plan stone and frame gable ended house. It was restored in 1957. The 1-story Dutch barn has a corrugated metal roof and clapboard siding.

It was listed on the National Register of Historic Places in 1999.
