= Hendrikus DuBois House =

Historic house in New York, United States

- U.S. National Register of Historic Places
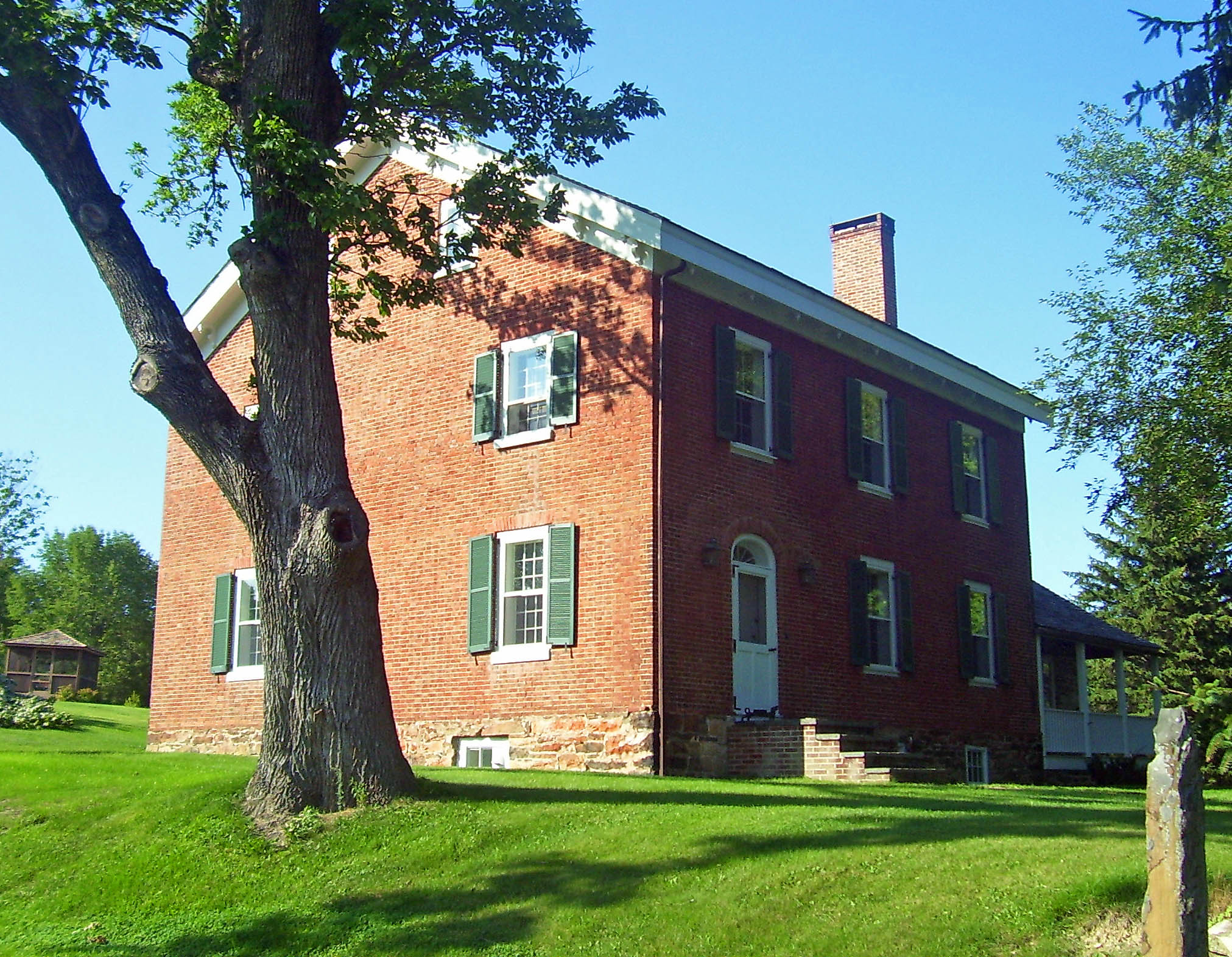
- House in 2007

- Location within New York Location within the United States
- Location: 600 Albany Post Rd., Libertyville, NY
- Nearest city: Poughkeepsie
- Coordinates: 41°43′17″N 74°07′33″W
- Area: 1 acre (0.40 ha)
- Built: 1730
- Architectural style: Federal
- NRHP reference No.: 82003410
- Added to NRHP: July 8, 1982

The Hendrikus DuBois House is located on Albany Post Road near the line between the towns of Gardiner and New Paltz in Ulster County, New York, United States, an area once known as Libertyville.

DuBois served as a captain in the Fourth Regiment of the Ulster County Militia during the American Revolutionary War. He built the house in 1775 on land his grandfather Louis, one of the original Huguenot settlers of the area, had bought from the Esopus Indians.

It was added to the National Register of Historic Places in 1982.
