= William Decker House =

- U.S. National Register of Historic Places
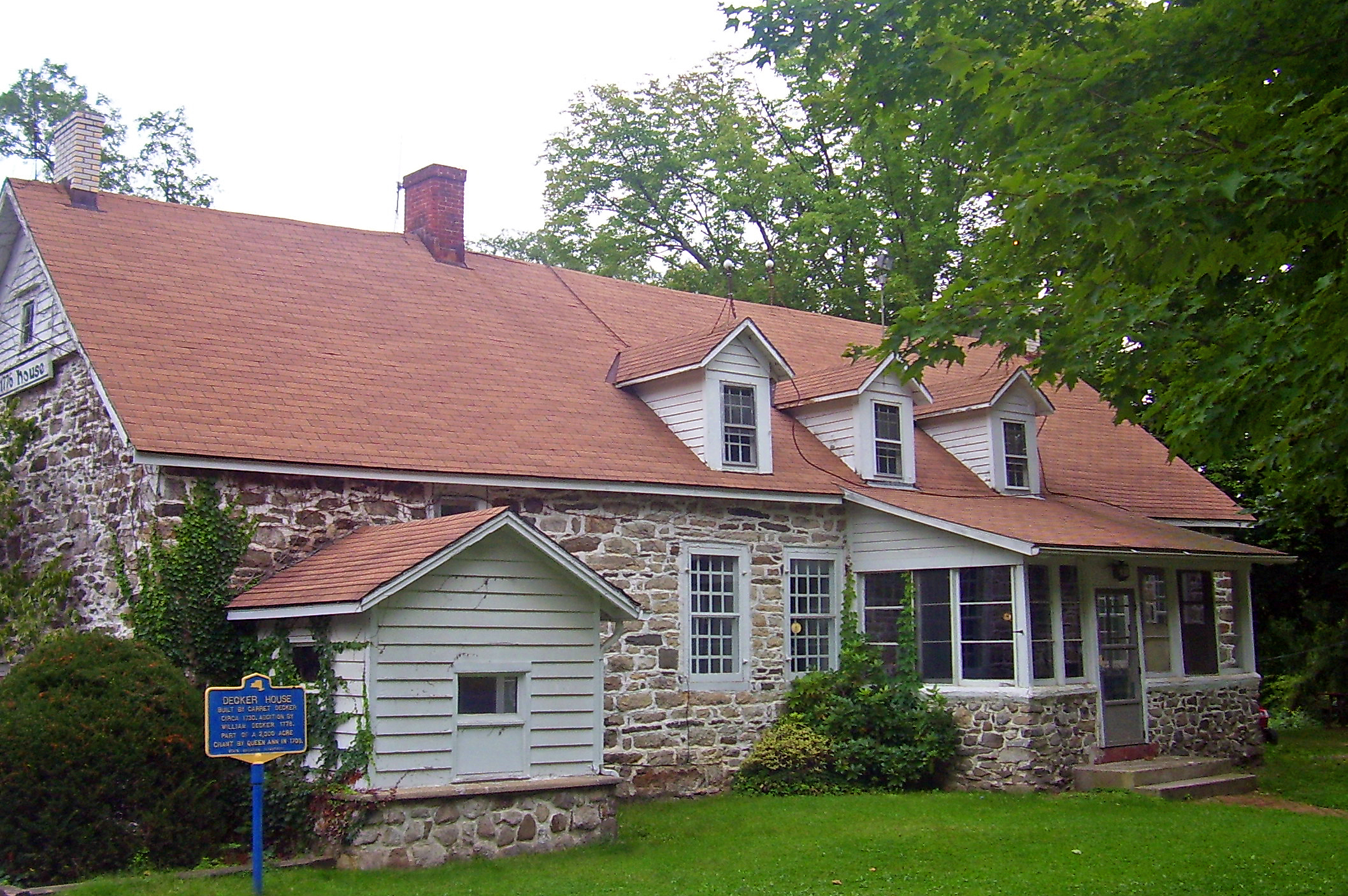
- House in 2007, with restaurant additions visible
- Location: Town of Shawangunk, NY
- Nearest city: Middletown
- Coordinates: 41°38′51″N 74°15′49″W
- Area: 9.7 acres (3.9 ha)
- Built: 1730, 1776
- Architect: Garrett Decker
- MPS: Shawangunk Valley MRA
- NRHP reference No.: 83001815
- Added to NRHP: September 26, 1983

The William Decker House is located on New Prospect Road in the Town of Shawangunk, New York, United States, at the center of the onetime hamlet of Dwaarkill, on the banks of the creek of the same name. It was built by early settler Garrett Decker in 1730 and later expanded on significantly by William in 1776.

The house was added to the National Register of Historic Places in 1983 (NRHP reference Number 83001815) and recently was joined to a more recently constructed building to serve as the Colonial Inn 1776 restaurant. On March 24, 2008, a fire destroyed the restaurant. The house itself suffered only minimal damage.
