= Guilford-Bower Farm House =

Historic house in New York, United States

- U.S. National Register of Historic Places
- Location within New York Location within the United States
- Nearest city: New Paltz, New York
- Coordinates: 41°42′40″N 74°9′30″W
- Area: 54 acres (22 ha)
- Built: 1850
- Architectural style: Mid 19th-Century Revival
- NRHP reference No.: 99000810
- Added to NRHP: July 8, 1999

Guilford-Bower Farm House is a historic home in New Paltz in Ulster County, New York. It was built about 1850 and is a large 2-story brick residence with a 1 1/2-story brick kitchen wing.

It was listed on the National Register of Historic Places in 1999.
