= Zachariah Barley Stone House =

Historic house in New York, United States

- U.S. National Register of Historic Places
- Zachariah Barley Stone House, September 2012

- Location within New York Location within the United States
- Location: 193 Whitfield Rd., Rochester, New York
- Coordinates: 41°49′32″N 74°14′22″W
- Area: 11 acres (4.5 ha)
- Built: c. 1770
- MPS: Rochester MPS
- NRHP reference No.: 95000951
- Added to NRHP: August 10, 1995

The Zachariah Barley Stone House is a historic house located at 193 Whitfield Road in Rochester, Ulster County, New York, USA.

== Description and history ==
It includes the house (c. 1770), hoop shop with attached modern garage (c. 1860), and smokehouse (c. 1850). The house is a 1 1/2-story, stone single dwelling that is rectangular in shape and built upon a linear plan. The hoop shop is a 1 1/2-story, heavy timer-framed building with a gabled roof. It features a massive exterior stone hearth.

It was listed on the National Register of Historic Places on August 10, 1995.
