= Sahler Stone House =

Historic house in New York, United States

- U.S. National Register of Historic Places
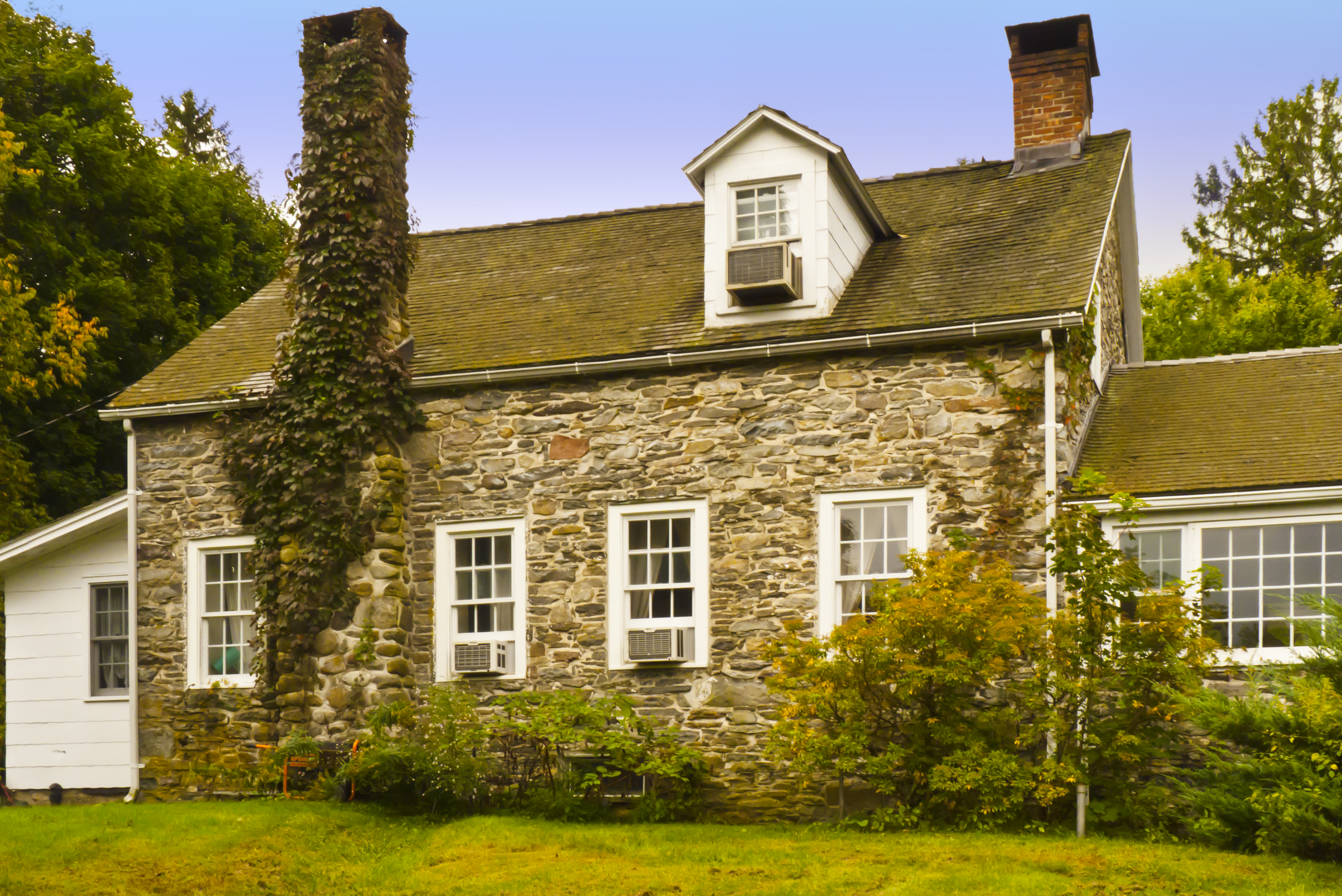
- Sahler Stone House, September 2012

- Location within New York Location within the United States
- Location: Kyserike Rd., Rochester, New York
- Coordinates: 41°49′9″N 74°11′17″W
- Area: 20 acres (8.1 ha)
- Built: 1750
- Architectural style: Colonial
- MPS: Rochester MPS
- NRHP reference No.: 99000992
- Added to NRHP: August 12, 1999

Sahler Stone House is a historic home located at Rochester in Ulster County, New York. The original block, dated to about 1750, is a two bay stone one story, one room structure. Spreading out from it are later stone and frame additions.

It was listed on the National Register of Historic Places in 1999.
