= Old Dutch Church Parsonage =

Historic house in New York, United States

- U.S. National Register of Historic Places
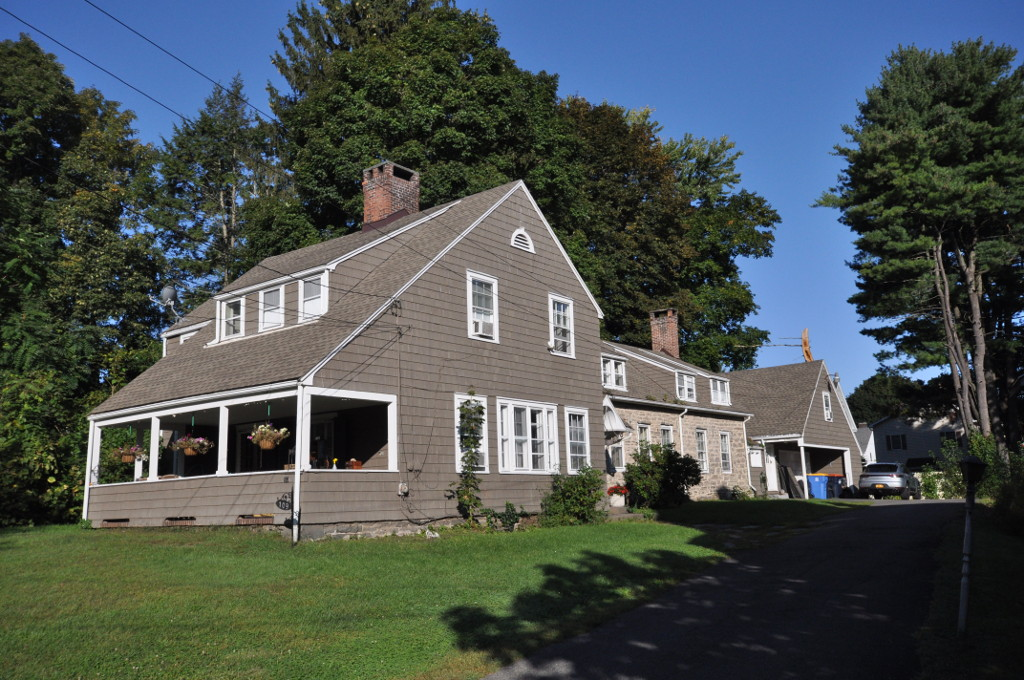

- Location within New York Location within the United States
- Location: 109 Pearl St., Kingston, New York
- Coordinates: 41°55′51″N 74°1′16″W
- Area: less than one acre
- Built: 1725, 1919
- Architect: Teller, Myron
- Architectural style: Colonial, Dutch Colonial Revival
- NRHP reference No.: 01000845
- Added to NRHP: August 15, 2001

Old Dutch Church Parsonage (also known as Cornelius Masten Stone House; Julia Dillon House) is a historic home located at 109 Pearl Street in Kingston, Ulster County, New York. It was built in 1725, in the Colonial and Dutch Colonial Revival architectural styles. It is a 1 1/2-story rubblestone dwelling with frame wings added in 1919.

It was added to the National Register of Historic Places in 2001.
