= Winfield Corners Stone House =

Historic house in New York, United States

- U.S. National Register of Historic Places
- Location within New York Location within the United States
- Location: Winfield Rd., Rochester, New York
- Coordinates: 41°49′20″N 74°11′43″W
- Area: 5.7 acres (2.3 ha)
- Built: 1732
- Architectural style: Colonial
- MPS: Rochester MPS
- NRHP reference No.: 99000993
- Added to NRHP: August 12, 1999

Winfield Corners Stone House is a historic home located at Rochester in Ulster County, New York. It is a 1 1/2-story, field stone house that is linear in plan with frame additions. It was built about 1732. The main house block has a central cross gable with a pair of flanking gable dormers.

It was listed on the National Register of Historic Places in 1999.
