= Stilwell Stone House =

Historic house in New York, United States

- U.S. National Register of Historic Places
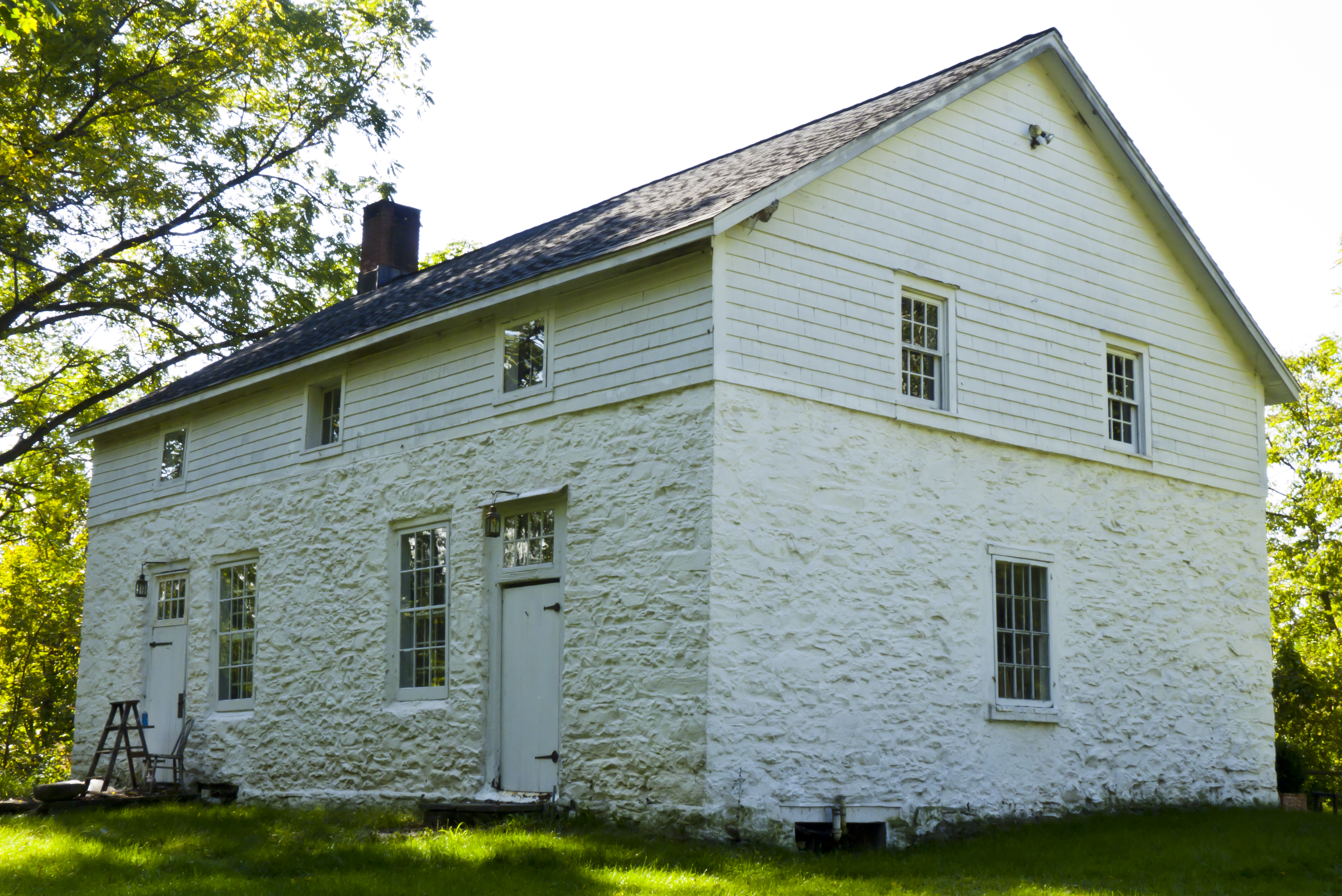
- Stilwell Stone House, September 2012

- Location within New York Location within the United States
- Location: 189 Old Kings Highway, Rochester, New York
- Coordinates: 41°48′40″N 74°11′19″W
- Area: 17 acres (6.9 ha)
- Built: 1795
- Architectural style: Federal
- MPS: Rochester MPS
- NRHP reference No.: 99000996
- Added to NRHP: August 12, 1999

Stilwell Stone House is a historic home located at Rochester in Ulster County, New York. It is a 1 1/2-story dwelling built about 1795 in a linear plan. Also on the property is a 19th-century barn.

It was listed on the National Register of Historic Places in 1999.
