= Benjamin Van Keuren House Ruin =

- U.S. National Register of Historic Places
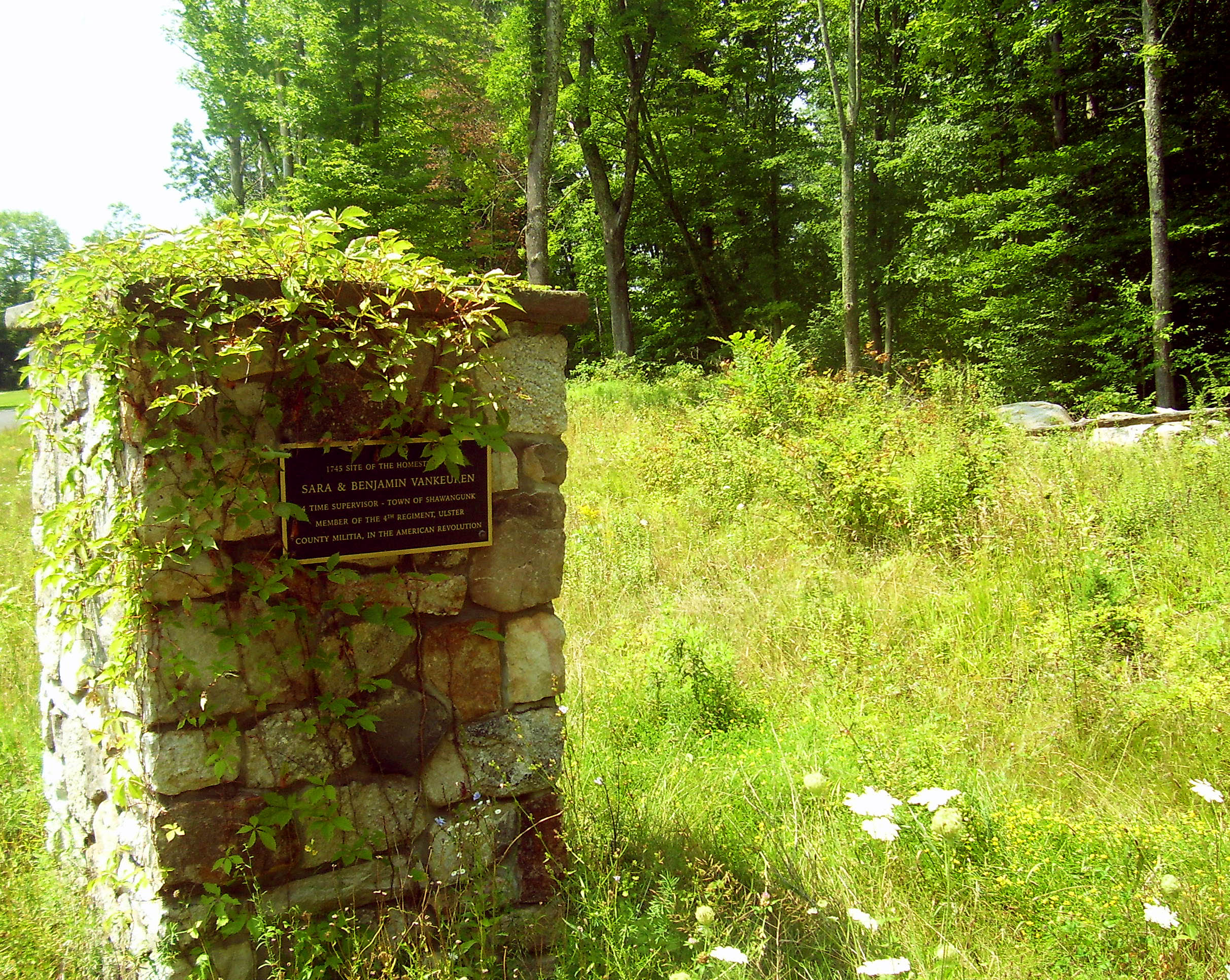
- House site in background with commemorative plaque on nearby pillar, 2007
- Location: Town of Shawangunk, NY
- Nearest city: Middletown
- Coordinates: 41°38′47″N 74°18′27″W
- Built: 1745
- NRHP reference No.: 00001424
- Added to NRHP: November 22, 2000

The Benjamin Van Keuren House Ruin is located at the corner of Bruyn Turnpike and Benjamin van Keuren Drive in the western portion of the Town of Shawangunk, in Ulster County, New York, United States. It was the site of the house built in 1745 by Van Keuren and his wife Sarah, early settlers of the area. He would later be elected town supervisor four times and serve in the 4th Regiment of the Ulster County Militia during the Revolutionary War.

Today only the foundation stones remain, on a slight rise at the edge of a nearby woodlot, after the building burned down. The town has honored Van Keuren and his role in its history by naming the street after him when houses were built on it recently, and putting a commemorative plaque on the nearby pillar. In 2000 the site was added to the National Register of Historic Places.
