= Johannes Rider Stone House =

Historic house in New York, United States

- U.S. National Register of Historic Places
- Johannes Rider Stone House, September 2012

- Location within New York Location within the United States
- Location: 7 Upper Whitfield Rd., Rochester, New York
- Coordinates: 41°49′33″N 74°13′26″W
- Area: 5 acres (2.0 ha)
- Built: 1815
- MPS: Rochester MPS
- NRHP reference No.: 95000956
- Added to NRHP: August 10, 1995

Johannes Rider Stone House is a historic home located at Rochester in Ulster County, New York. It includes the house (c. 1815) and a wood-frame shed (c. 1890). It is a 1 1/2-story bank house built upon a linear plan. It has a front-gable stone section with frame ells to the east and west.

It was listed on the National Register of Historic Places in 1995.
