= Jacobus Van Wagenen Stone House =

Historic house in New York, United States

- U.S. National Register of Historic Places
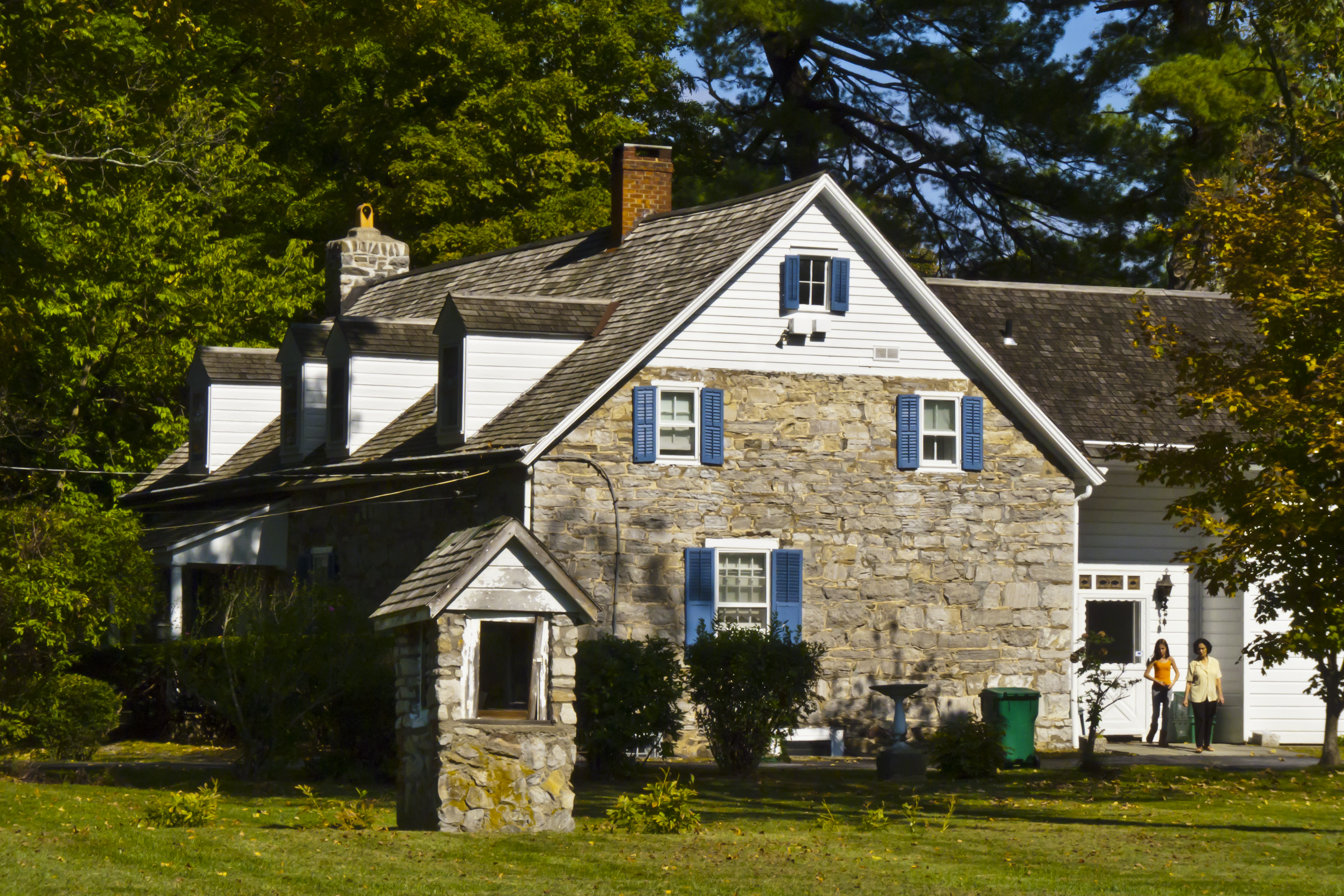
- Jacobus Van Wagenen Stone House, September 2012

- Location within New York Location within the United States
- Location: 2659 Lucas Turnpike, Rochester, New York
- Coordinates: 41°48′15″N 74°10′39″W
- Area: 9.3 acres (3.8 ha)
- Built: c. 1751
- Architectural style: Colonial
- MPS: Rochester MPS
- NRHP reference No.: 99000999
- Added to NRHP: August 12, 1999

Jacobus Van Wagenen Stone House is a historic home located at Rochester in Ulster County, New York. It is a traditional 1 1/2-story stone, gable-roofed house built about 1751.

It was listed on the National Register of Historic Places in 1999.
