= Frank A. Palen House =

Historic house in New York, United States

- U.S. National Register of Historic Places
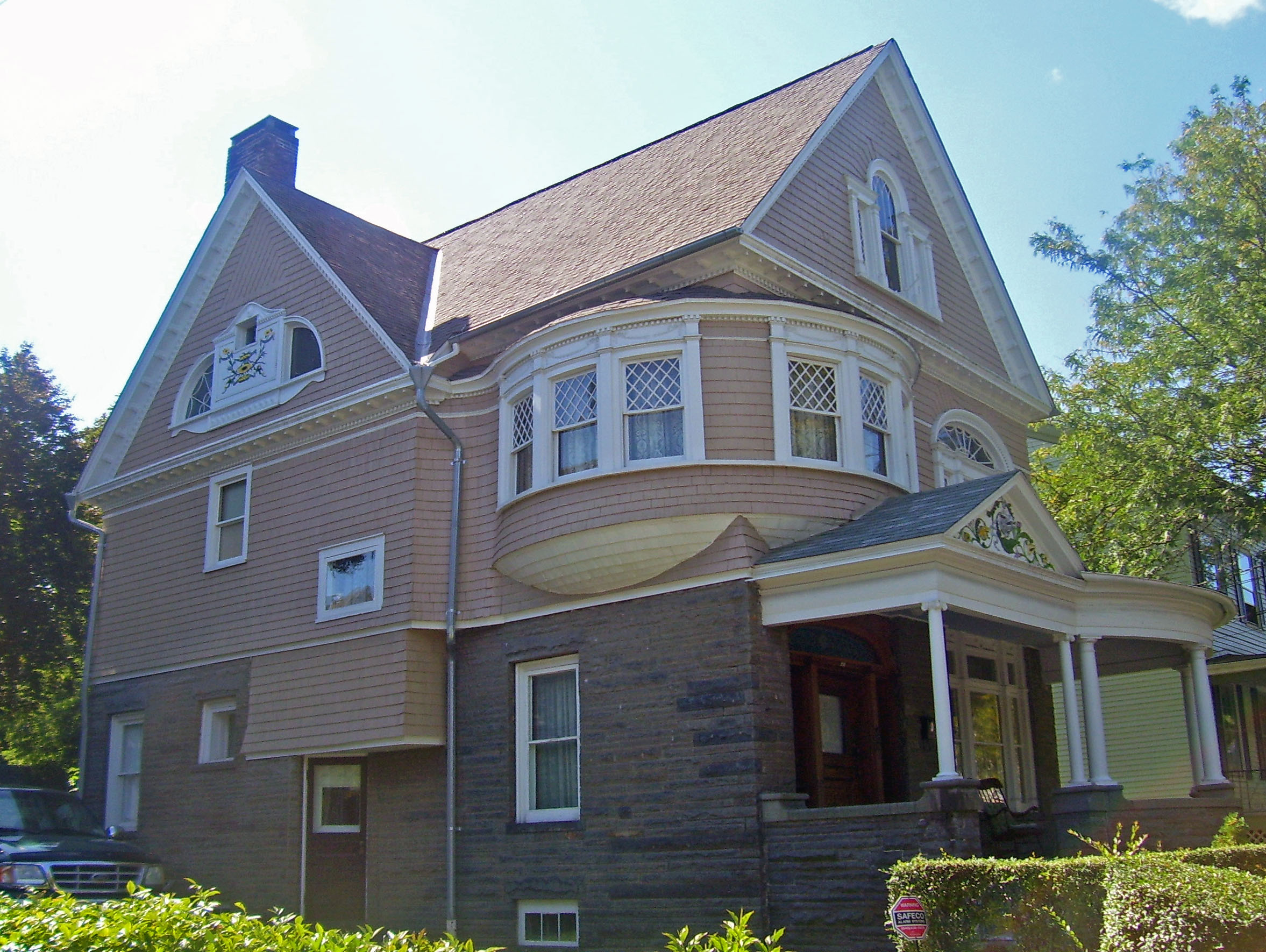
- Frank Palen House, September 2008

- Location within New York Location within the United States
- Location: 74-76 St. James St., Kingston, New York
- Coordinates: 41°55′50″N 74°0′53″W
- Area: 0.2 acres (0.081 ha)
- Built: 1892
- Architectural style: Queen Anne, Stick/Eastlake
- NRHP reference No.: 05000015
- Added to NRHP: February 9, 2005

Frank A. Palen House is a historic home located at Kingston in Ulster County, New York. It is a Queen Anne style residence built in 1892.

It was listed on the National Register of Historic Places in 2005.
