= Cordts Mansion =

Historic house in New York, United States

- U.S. National Register of Historic Places
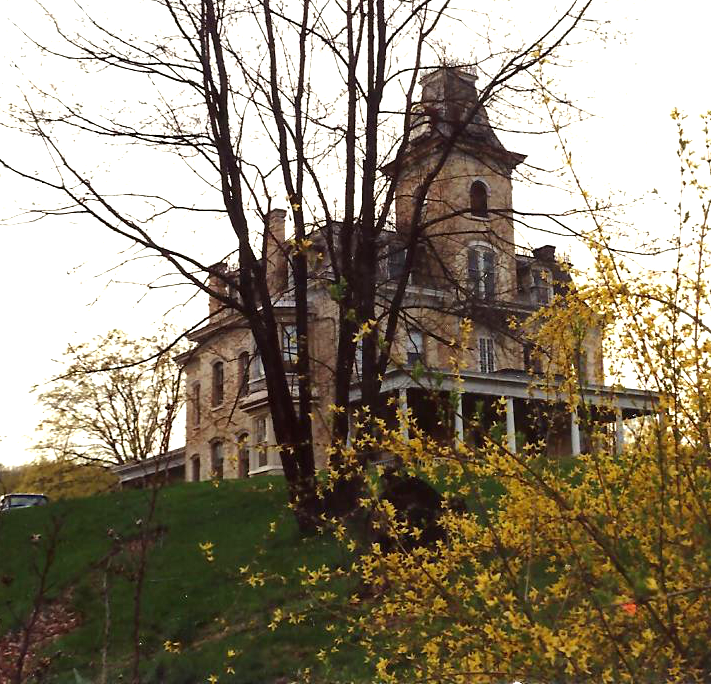

- Location within New York Location within the United States
- Location: 82-152 Lindsley Ave., Kingston, New York
- Coordinates: 41°55′46″N 73°58′22″W
- Area: 9 acres (3.6 ha)
- Built: 1873
- Architectural style: Colonial, Second Empire
- NRHP reference No.: 07001039
- Added to NRHP: October 3, 2007

Edgewood, aka Cordts Mansion is a historic home located at Kingston in Ulster County, New York. It is an impressive, three story Second Empire style residence built in 1873 for a prominent brick merchant and a manufacturer, John A. Cordts. It features a centered tower, slate sloping concave mansard roof with headed dormer windows, iron roof cresting, a columned front porch verandah, and a bay window. Hutton Brickyards

It was listed on the National Register of Historic Places in 2007.

Known to the Cordts family as Edgewood, it is an impressive three-story Second Empire mansion, constructed in 1873 for John H. Cordts, a brick merchant, manufacturer and co-founder of the firm of Cordts and Hutton. It is located within the Hudson River Valley National Heritage Area and is prominently sited atop a hill facing east and overlooking the Hudson River. The mansion occupies anine-acre, mostly-landscaped lot located on the east side of Lindsley Avenue, north of Delaware Avenue, in Kingston, New York. Adjoining the mansion lot to the north is Hutton Brickyards; across Lindsley Avenue, to the south and east is Delaware Avenue and residential housing, some of which was owned by the Cordts family and occupied by brick company employees; to the west across Lindsley Avenue, is a wood lot property once owned by the Newark Lime and Cement Manufacturing Company as well as the Moses Yeomans House, a pre-Revolutionary stone house with former ties to the Newark Lime and Cement Manufacturing Company.

The Edgewood Mansion is an imposing building with many distinctive exterior details and features associated with the Second Empire style including the centered tower, slate sloping concave mansard roof with hooded dormer windows having jigsaw trim, iron roof cresting much of it topped with finials in a modified fleur de lys style, molded cornices with paired support eave brackets, a columned front porch verandah, round headed windows, and a side bay window facing south on the first and second stories. Windows on the first and second stories and in the arched tower have shutters. The windows are varied but mostly two over two or two over one. The main section of roof beyond the iron cresting and not visible from the grounds is asphalt. The structural system is joisted masonry. The brickwork is painted yellow and appears to be mainly common bond. The architect is not known but the construction would likely have been supervised by John H. Cordts with materials provided by the Cordts and Hutton brickyard and the Hutton Company lumberyard, both nearby. The dimensions are irregular containing numerous projections and setbacks but can be approximated to 45 ft. x 90 ft. on the first story, 45 ft. x 75 ft. on the second story and 36 ft. x 75 ft. on the third story.

The mansion is now part of Hutton Brickyards and will available for hotel stays starting in summer of 2022.

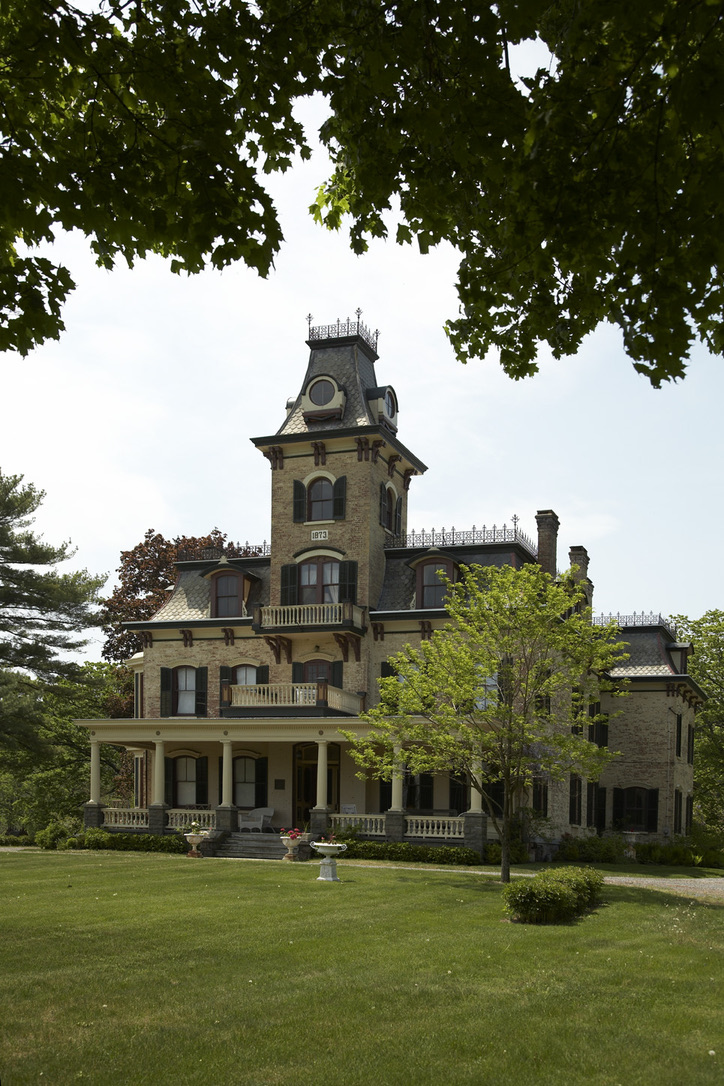
Edgewood mansion - Hutton Brickyards - Cordts Mansion - Kingston NY

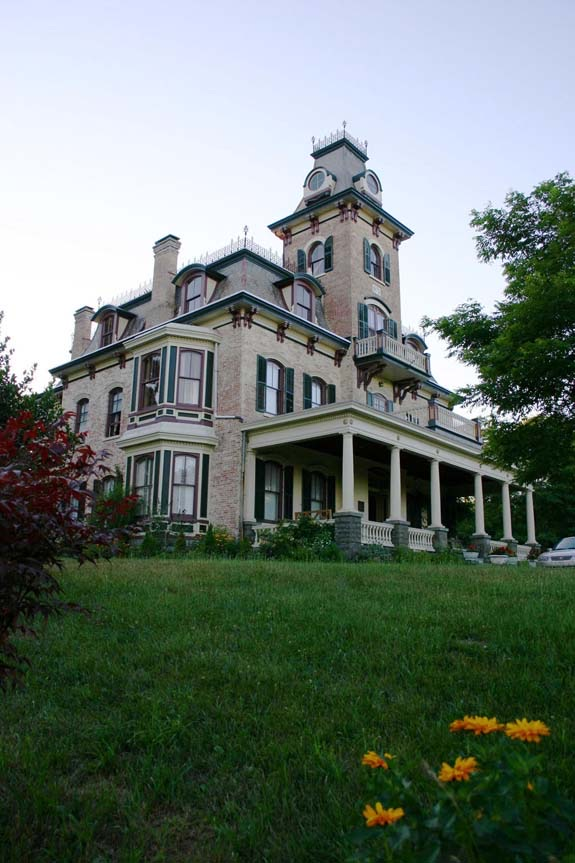
Edgewood mansion - Hutton Brickyards - Cordts Mansion - Kingston NY

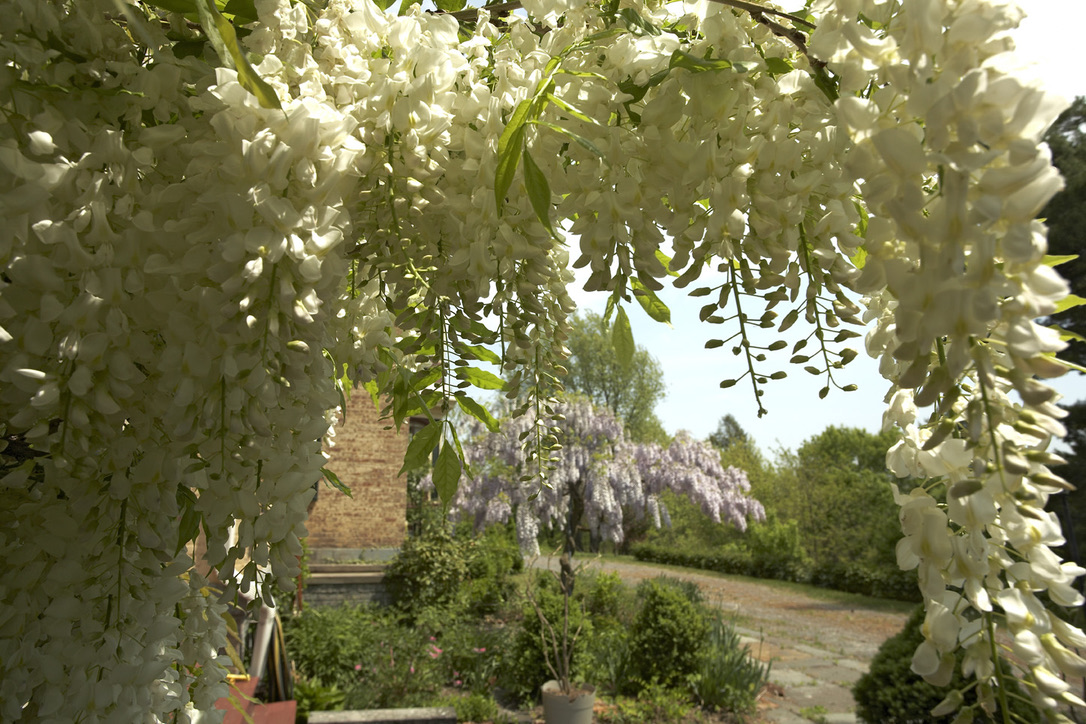
Edgewood mansion - Hutton Brickyards - Cordts Mansion - Kingston NY

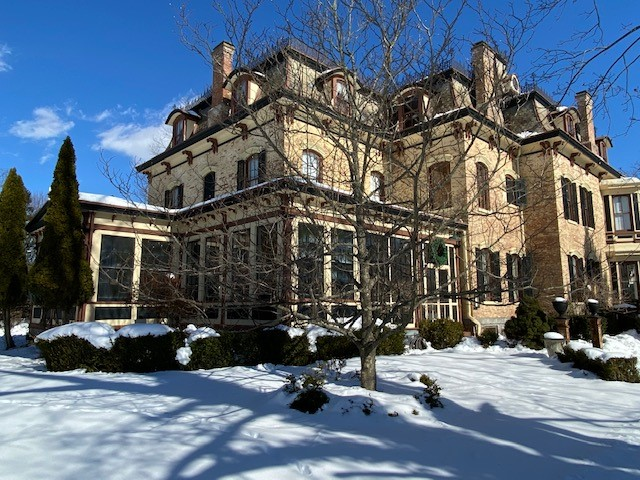
Edgewood mansion in the winter of 2020

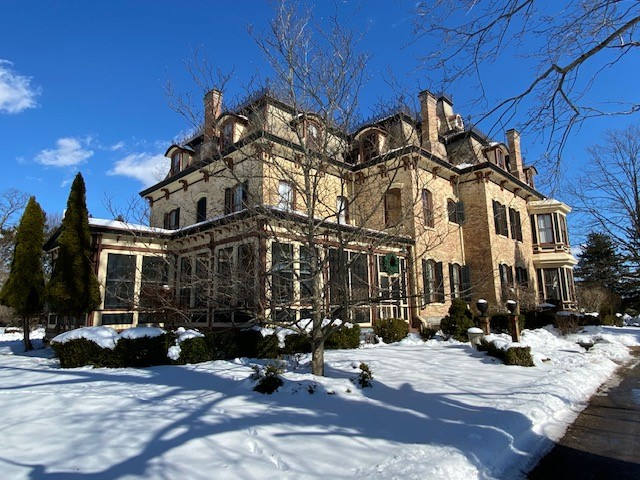
Edgewood mansion in the winter of 2020

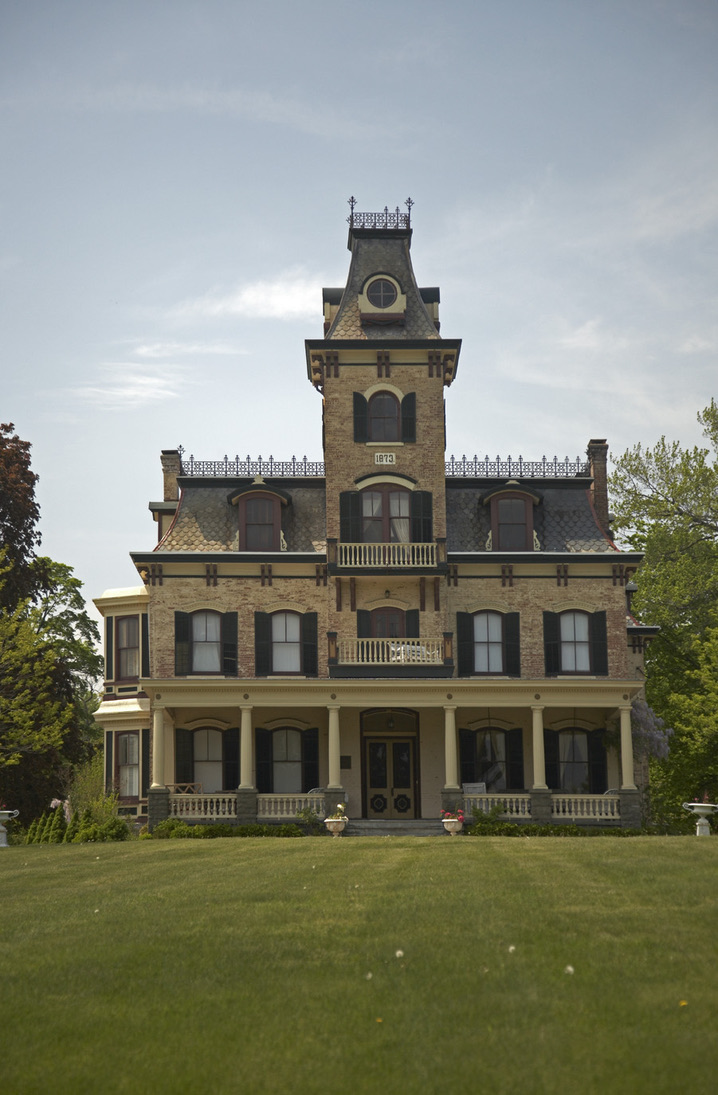
Edgewood mansion - Hutton Brickyards - Cordts Mansion - Kingston NY

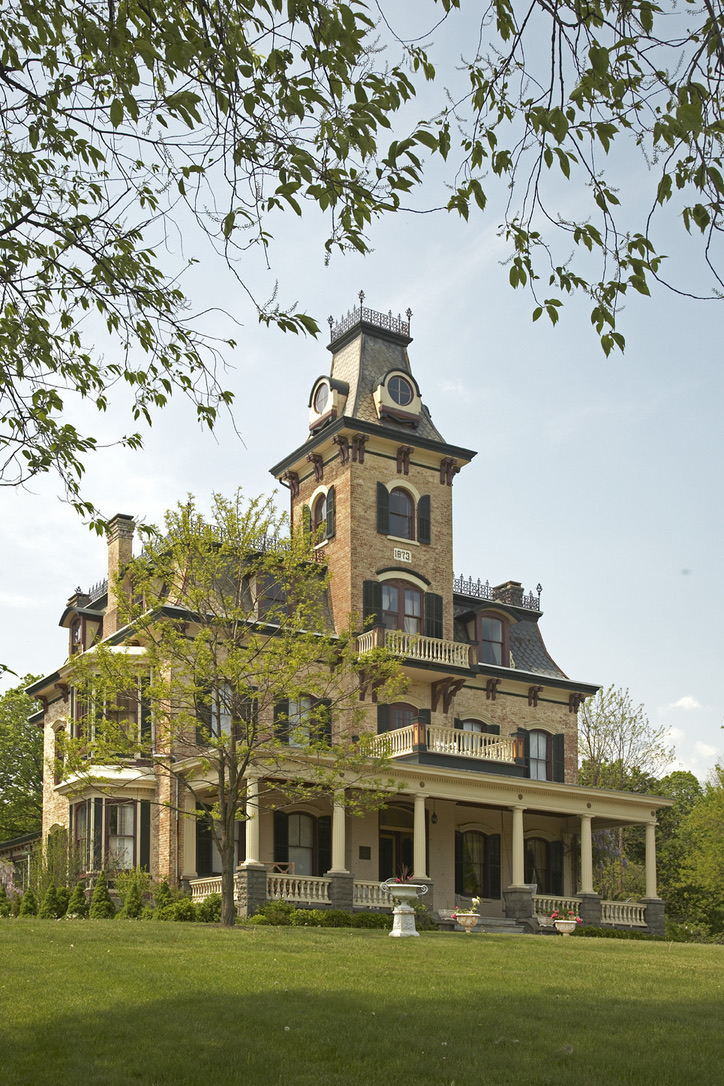
Edgewood mansion - Hutton Brickyards - Cordts Mansion - Kingston NY
