= Van Wagenen Stone House and Farm Complex =

Historic house in New York, United States

- U.S. National Register of Historic Places
- Location within New York Location within the United States
- Location: 2732 Lucas Turnpike, Rochester, New York
- Coordinates: 41°48′20″N 74°10′56″W
- Area: 125 acres (51 ha)
- Architectural style: Colonial, Federal
- MPS: Rochester MPS
- NRHP reference No.: 99000994
- Added to NRHP: August 12, 1999

Van Wagenen Stone House and Farm Complex, also known as Het Kilities Landt, is a historic home and farm complex located at Rochester in Ulster County, New York. The property includes the house, bank barn (c. 1880), small shed (c. 1890), storage barn (c. 1920), small barn with attached shed (c. 1920), and a garden shed (c. 1890). Also on the property are the remains of a smokehouse and the dug well. It is a 1 1/2-story, linear stone dwelling dated to the early 18th century. The front features five irregularly spaced dormers.

It was listed on the National Register of Historic Places in 1999.
