= Terwilliger House (Shawangunk, New York) =

Historic house in New York, United States

- U.S. National Register of Historic Places
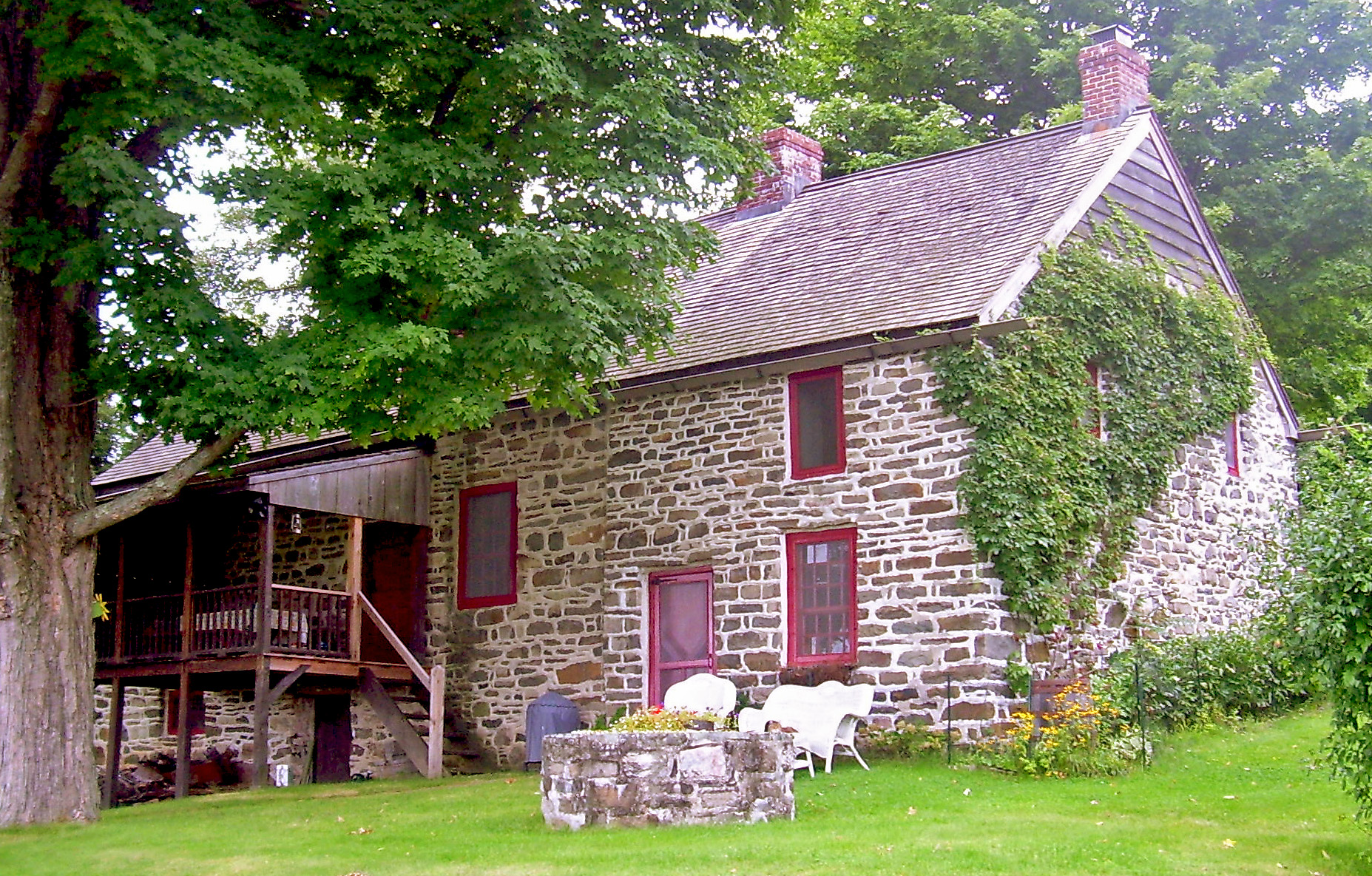
- House in 2007

- Location within New York Location within the United States
- Location: Town of Shawangunk
- Nearest city: Newburgh
- Coordinates: 41°36′59″N 74°13′58″W
- Area: 68.1 acres (27.6 ha)
- Built: c. 1766-1800
- Architectural style: Federal
- MPS: Shawangunk Valley MRA
- NRHP reference No.: 83001821
- Added to NRHP: September 26, 1983

The Terwilliger House is a historic home located on Myers Road in the Town of Shawangunk, Ulster County, New York, United States. It was built between about 1766 and 1800, and is a two-story, five-bay, Federal frame dwelling on a stone foundation. It has a one-story kitchen addition.

It was added to the National Register of Historic Places in 1983.
