= Tour de Kingston =

The Tour de Kingston is an annual cycling event held in the city of Kingston, New York. The event is designed to promote bicycling, drug-free community events, recreation, socialization, and to promote the region.

The Tour de Kingston is a free, police-escorted event founded by Allen Nace in 2006. He was joined by Bike Brothers Bike Shop and Kingston Mayor James Sottile, who allowed the Tour to be insured under the city of Kingston policy. The ride has been sponsored by Dr. Douglas Astion, Dr. Riccardo Esposito, Walmart, Nace Promotions, Health Alliance of the Hudson Valley, the YMCA of Kingston/ Ulster and by registration fees. Promotion of the event has been through WKNY Radio Sports Talk with Dan Reinhard, WDST Radio Woodstock, WBBM Radio Kingston, as well as the newspapers the Daily Freeman, the Kingston Times, and the Almanac. The Tour includes a slow ride through historic Kingston with stops at the Firemen's Museum and the Senate House.

Another regular stop on the tour is the Forsyth Nature Center. Funds raised from the bicycling events help fund scholarships, buy bicycles and assist individuals and groups in the community engaged in positive activities. The Tour has been the first event that has managed to bring together multiple bicycle shops for the good of bicycling. In addition to the original shops Bike Brothers of Kingston and Rhinebeck Bikes, Favatta's Table Rock Tours, Rosendale, Revolution Cycles, Saugerties, Overlook Bikes, Woodstock, and Big Wheels have joined.

The event is a community based and community sponsored event. It is possible through the efforts of many. This multiple ride event has the 5 mile family fun ride that tours historic Kingston as well as rides of 10, 25 and 50 miles. These rides include Kingston, Woodstock, Rosendale, Saugerties, the Ashokan Reservoir and views of the Catskill Mountains.

In 2010 the Tour included a Bicycle Rodeo that is presented by the Mid-Hudson Health and Safety Institute. 2010 also brought the YMCA of Ulster County and Kingston into the scene. The YMCA replaced the City of Kingston as the insurer of the event. The Kingston Hospital Foundation became the primary finance sponsor in 2008 and continued for every year since.

The 2011 Tour de Kingston featured 500 participants. In addition to the traditional 5 Mile Family Ride as well as the 12, 25 and 50 mile ride there was a bicycle rodeo for youngsters learning to ride and learning safety on bicycles.

Scholarship winners were Tara McGowan (Dr. Douglas Astion Award) and Allison Turner (Founders Award).

The 2012 Tour de Kingston again had hundreds of participants. The scholarship Winners were Yvonne Velez (Dr. Douglas Astion) and Frank Berensheim (Founders Award).

The YMCA of Ulster County, Cycle Therapy / Nace (Founder) and Bike Brothers (Founder) along with The Kingston Hospital/ Health Alliance of the Hudson Valley continued to be major sponsors of the community event. Additional bike shops (Big Wheels) joined the Tour. Most bike shops in the region are participants in the event in one way or another. Favatta's has donated bikes and hosted rest stops as do The Bike Brothers and Rhinebeck Cyclery on an annual basis. Overlook bikes served as a rest stop for the longer distance rides in 2011 and 2012.

2013 brought the 8th Annual Tour de Kingston, There were 500 participants according to the Daily Freeman. In addition to the regular rides 2013 brought a Rail Ride. Revolution Cycles in Saugerties, New York designed and led the Road and Rail version. This addition made the Tour the first local ride with rides for all. On road of various distances, a 5 mile family ride as well as a few choices for off road rides.

The 2013 Scholarship Winners were Alyssa Murtagh and Brey McCooey.

The 9th Annual Tour de Kingston was held on June 22, 2014. The same rides were held and an additional ride was added. The new ride was a Road and Rail ride that used the expanding rail trails to develop the first local recreational off road ride. Participant chose between the 5,10,25 and 50 mile road rides and 10, 17, and 25 mile road and rail trail rides. The recently opened Rosendale Trestle was included. Local news coverage from the Kingston Daily Freeman, Kingston Times and the Lincoln Eagle newspapers plus the YNN Television Network helped publicize the event. The 2014 participant numbers rose to 450-500. The new higher numbers were handled through the support of community agencies and businesses. Primary among them were the YMCA of Ulster County, HealthAlliance Foundation and Walgreens. In addition many other local businesses set up vending tables or offered donations. Bicycle clubs from a large area attended as well as bicycle shops making it a very inclusive event.

The 2014 scholarship winners were Alexander Chasin and Qumari Jackson.

The 10th Annual Tour de Kingston was scheduled and held on Sunday June 28, 2015. It was a rainy day and the expectations were lowered. However, over 150 people registered and close to 100 showed to ride in the rain. The 50 and 25 mile rides were larger than expected with 60 riders and the newer "Endurance" Off Road Ride proved to be just that. Many of the riders who did the Endurance Ride reported it to be the toughest charity ride they ever did.

The event is held on the Sunday following Father's Day and continues to be open to all participants whether they pay, make a donation or not.

In addition to scholarships, the Tour's focus is on improving bicycling and bicycling safety, improving safe routes and promoting the region. The inclusive event offers free set up for bicycle shops and clubs.
