= Drummer Boy (film) =

2026 historical musical film

- Theatrical release poster
- Directed by: Ben Smallbone; Joel David Smallbone
- Written by: Richard L. Ramsey
- Produced by: Chip Diggins; Kristy Choo; Luke Smallbone; Justin Tolley
- Starring: Joel David Smallbone; Lucas Leach; India Brown; Melora Hardin; Ioan Gruffudd; Beth Easdown; Beverley Knight; Charles Esten; Iain Glen
- Cinematography: Cathal Watters
- Edited by: Andrew Chandler
- Music by: For King & Country
- Production companies: Red 56; 2521 Entertainment
- Distributed by: Angel Studios
- Release date: November 6, 2026
- Running time: 128 minutes
- Country: United States
- Language: English
- Budget: $10 million
- Box office: $18.9 million

Drummer Boy is a 2026 American historical musical drama film directed by Ben and Joel David Smallbone and set during the American Revolution. Joel David stars as Jeremiah Clem, an American Loyalist who fights for the British Army, with Lucas Leach co-starring in the titular role as Benjamin Clem, Jeremiah's brother who becomes a drummer for the American Continental Army. India Brown, Melora Hardin, Ioan Gruffudd, Beth Easdown, Beverley Knight, Charles Esten, and Iain Glen round out the cast in supporting roles. The film was released by Angel Studios on November 6, 2026, to mixed reviews from critics, but high audience praise.

== Plot ==
In 1762, during the French and Indian War, two English families, the Clems and the Balfours, are on a ship headed to the Thirteen Colonies. As the ship arrives to shore, the French Navy ambushes them. Naval officer Nathaniel Clem is killed defending the ship's passengers as his youngest son Benjamin suffers a leg injury, forcing him to use a knee brace into adulthood.

Twelve years later in 1774, the Clems and Balfours have settled in Kingston, New York. Benjamin and his brother Jeremiah help their mother Rachel operate a grain mill. Jeremiah has his eyes set on Lord Balfour's daughter Elizabeth, maintaining a friendship with Balfour's young slave Emmalin, who has unrequited feelings for him. When news of the Battles of Lexington and Concord breaks out, the people of Kingston are split, with Benjamin expressing sympathy for the rebels. Jeremiah, having grown cynical and unwilling to disappoint Lord Balfour and Elizabeth, sides with the British Crown and joins the British Army, attempting to save face when Benjamin refuses to apologize for his dissent. Though the Clem brothers initially insist they will never be torn apart, they argue during Jeremiah's final supper at home before he joins a regiment led by Balfour.

Unwilling to sit idle, Benjamin himself leaves to join the Continental Army, devastating Rachel. Though initially turned away due to his leg injury, Benjamin follows and impresses the American regiment led by Major John Ambrose with his percussion skills, becoming their primary drummer boy. Jeremiah is promoted in his regiment as Balfour was friends with his father Nathaniel. Meanwhile, Elizabeth spurns Jeremiah's letters and romance, unwilling to commit to him during the war, but claims she is too busy to write him back, so Emmalin, who was secretly taught by Jeremiah during their childhoods and is saving up to buy her own freedom, forges a letter to inform him. Despite only intending to write once, Jeremiah's response to the letter signed by "E" sparks a correspondence, with Emmalin posing as Elizabeth and Jeremiah developing stronger feelings for "E" while maintaining a friendship. Elizabeth and her right-hand man eventually discover that not only had Emmalin been forging the letters, but that she was teaching the other slaves to read, so they reject Emmalin's offer to free herself and have her flogged.

As the two opposing regiments fight successive battles, Benjamin and Jeremiah eventually see each other on the battlefield on opposing sides and become conflicted. Balfour suddenly announces his intention to withdraw his regiment to Kingston and profit off the town, shocking Jeremiah and several other redcoats. The Americans burn much of the town and ambush the British, though Ambrose dies in battle, but not before making Benjamin promise not to kill anyone. Retreating to the Balfour mansion, an injured Jeremiah is tended by Emmalin after Elizabeth reveals the former's authorship of the letters. The Americans set fire to the Balfour mansion, with Jeremiah, Emmalin, Elizabeth, and the slaves barely escaping. Jeremiah realizes his feelings for Emmalin, who reveals that Balfour was her biological father.

Unwilling to fight for Balfour anymore after seeing his true character, Jeremiah refuses to lead a charge on Benjamin's regiment. Balfour orders Jeremiah's execution with the redcoats reluctantly agreeing, but Benjamin marches forward from his side singing "The Little Drummer Boy", serving as a distraction. A scuffle briefly occurs with Jeremiah taking a bullet from Balfour intended for Benjamin. The British refuse to attack the Americans on Christmas and stand down, carrying a severely injured Jeremiah to the American side and arresting Balfour for his conduct.

Benjamin is given an honorable discharge by General George Washington and told to "take care of his family", settling with Rachel and a recovering Jeremiah. Emmalin writes one final letter to Jeremiah, acknowledging their shared love and hoping to meet him again as she leads other escaped slaves to freedom. The Clem brothers resolve to find her, with Jeremiah writing another letter to her.

== Cast ==
- Joel David Smallbone as Jeremiah Clem, a cynical mill worker who sides with the British
- Lucas Leach as Benjamin Clem, Jeremiah's younger brother who has a lifelong knee injury and a talent for percussion. He sides with the Americans
- India Brown as Emmalin, Jeremiah's childhood friend and a household slave for the Balfour family and the lord's illegitimate daughter. She is in love with Jeremiah and becomes his love interest
- Melora Hardin as Rachel Clem, Jeremiah and Benjamin's mother and Nathaniel's widow
- Ioan Gruffudd as Nathaniel Clem, the late father to Jeremiah and Benjamin and husband to Rachel
- Beth Easdown as Lady Elizabeth Balfour, the conceited daughter of Lord Balfour and Jeremiah's initial love interest
- Beverley Knight as Margaret, an elder slave for the Balfours and Emmalin's peer
- Charles Esten as Lord Balfour, Elizabeth's widowed, manipulative, wealthy father. He was a friend of Nathaniel and leads Jeremiah's British regiment
- Iain Glen as Major John Ambrose, a Scottish Presbyterian displaced by the English who has lost his son James. He leads Benjamin's American regiment

== Production ==
The film had been in development by the Smallbone brothers since 2019, when they workshopped the idea with the Erwin brothers. It was officially announced by Angel Studios in April 2026, described as "an action-musical... which follows two brothers as they find themselves on opposite sides of the American Revolutionary War." Filming began in Ireland the following month. In June, star Melora Hardin posted that filming had wrapped. It is the second film released by Angel in 2026 set during the American Revolution, after July's Young Washington.

== Soundtrack ==
=== Track listing ===
No.	Title	Performer(s)	Length
1.	"Rhythms of the Sea"	Cast of Drummer Boy, Angel	0:39
2.	"Land Ho"	Ioan Gruffudd, Melora Hardin, Charles Esten, Angel	1:50
3.	"Who I Hope To Be"	For King & Country, Lucas Leach, Beth Easdown, India Brown, Charles Esten, Angel	4:44
4.	"Heart of A Lion"	For King & Country, Lucas Leach, Melora Hardin, Angel	3:32
5.	"Broken Lullabies"	Joel Smallbone, Lucas Leach, Melora Hardin, Angel	4:03
6.	"Same Blood"	Joel Smallbone, Lucas Leach, Charles Esten, Beverley Knight, India Brown, Iain Glen, Angel	3:41
7.	"Wildflower"	India Brown	3:32
8.	"O Come, O Come Emmanuel"	Joel Smallbone, Beth Easdown, Lucas Leach, Iain Glen, India Brown, Beverly Knight	3:43
9.	"Try"	Joel Smallbone, India Brown	2:53
10.	"Little Drummer Boy"	Lucas Leach	2:15
11.	"Who I Hope To Be (Reprise)"	Joel Smallbone, Lucas Leach, India Brown, Beverly Knight	2:46
12.	"O Come All Ye Faithful (Radiant Mix)"	For King & Country	3:30
13.	"Little Drummer Boy (Radiant Mix)"	For King & Country	3:57
Total length:			41:00:00

=== Charts ===
Chart performance for Drummer Boy (Original Motion Picture Soundtrack)
Chart (2026)	Peak position
US Soundtrack Albums (Billboard)	21

== Release ==
The film was theatrically released by Angel Studios on November 6, 2026.

== Reception ==
=== Box office ===
In the United States and Canada, Drummer Boy was projected to gross around $5 million from 2,850 theaters in its opening weekend. It ended up over-performing, debuting to $9.3 million and finishing in third place; 28% of ticket sales came from the South.

=== Critical response ===
On the review aggregator website Rotten Tomatoes, 69% of 16 critics' reviews are positive, with an average rating of 5.9/10. Audiences polled by CinemaScore gave the film an average grade of "A" on an A+ to F scale, while 81% of those surveyed by PostTrak said they would definitely recommend the film.

Dennis Harvey of Variety wrote "Arriving a bit late to ride the fizzled momentum of the nation's semiquincentennial, and a bit early for Christmas, patriotic musical Drummer Boy nonetheless should strike a chord with Christian audiences."
