= Tobias Van Steenburgh House =

Historic house in New York, United States

- U.S. National Register of Historic Places
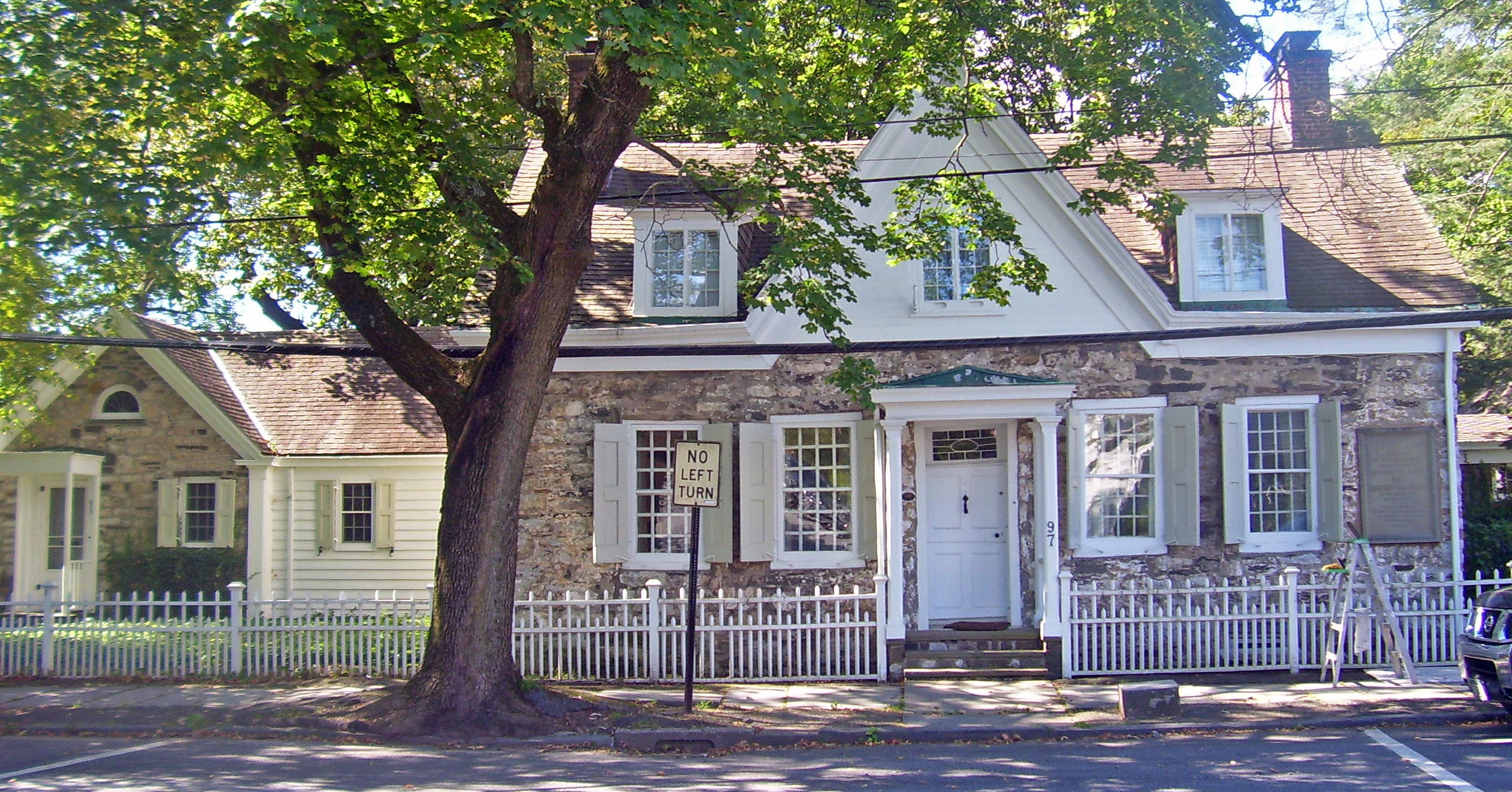
- Location: Kingston, NY
- Coordinates: 41°55′37″N 74°0′56″W
- Built: ca. 1700
- NRHP reference No.: 99001493
- Added to NRHP: 1999

The Tobias Van Steenburgh House is located on Wall Street (NY 32) in Kingston, New York, United States. It is a stone house built around the beginning of the 18th century.

It was one of the few buildings in Kingston not burned by the British in 1777. A large plaque on the front of the house notes this. In 1999 it was added to the National Register of Historic Places.

== Building ==
The house is located on the west side of Wall Street near its junction with Franklin Street. The surrounding neighborhood is residential, with houses of more recent construction. There is a former school building to the west. In the rear of the house are a modern garage and swimming pool, neither of which are considered contributing properties to the National Register listing. An iron fence separates the property from the sidewalk.

From a full basement, the house rises one and a half stories. It is faced in limestone rubble and has a steeply pitched gabled roof with projecting eaves pierced by a large central dormer with flanking shed dormers. On the west (rear) elevation, there is a frame extension one bay wider than the house itself in either direction. Both bays end in small, gabled dependencies.

The east (front) facade is five bays wide, asymmetrical but with a centrally located front entrance. The windows are in heavy mortise and tenon frames. In the front wall near the north end is a large embedded stone tablet explaining that the house "suffered no injury" when British troops burned Kingston on October 16, 1777, and that it was home to the van Steenburgh family for two centuries.

The north and south ends are similar, with asymmetrical fenestration in both. A garret door remains in the upper gable end on the west profile.

The main entrance, a recessed Georgian-style door with transom, opens into a central hallway that runs the depth of the original stone building. A parlor is on the east and a large dining area on the west. Both rooms have exposed ceiling beams and Georgian trim. In the parlor is an intricate Federal style mantel with chip-carved sunburst motif. The dining room has a large fireplace with plain surround meant for cooking. The original rear doors lead into the rear extension; hyphens lead to other stone dependencies with office space and a modern kitchen.

== History ==
The house's build date of 1700 comes from a statement by its owner in the late 1930s. He told the Daily Freeman, Kingston's newspaper, that the house had been built by that year. Its original owner, the first Van Steenburgh, was a man named Jan Janisse, later Jansen Timmerman, from the Dutch town of Amersfoort who assumed the Van Steenburgh name after he married in 1660.

His descendant Tobias Van Steenburgh was the owner of record at the time of the Revolution. Why the house was not burned in 1777 is not known. Legend has it that it was the home of a Mrs. Hammersly, a woman with Loyalist sympathies, who was in love with a British officer who spared the house. Others have it that the British began to burn the house, but the order to withdraw was sounded soon after and slaves who were hiding in the nearby woods quickly extinguished what little fire there was after the troops left. A variant on that tale says that since the house was used as an inn at the time, the slaves rolled a barrel of rum they had tapped and treated the soldiers to free drink until the order came to leave.

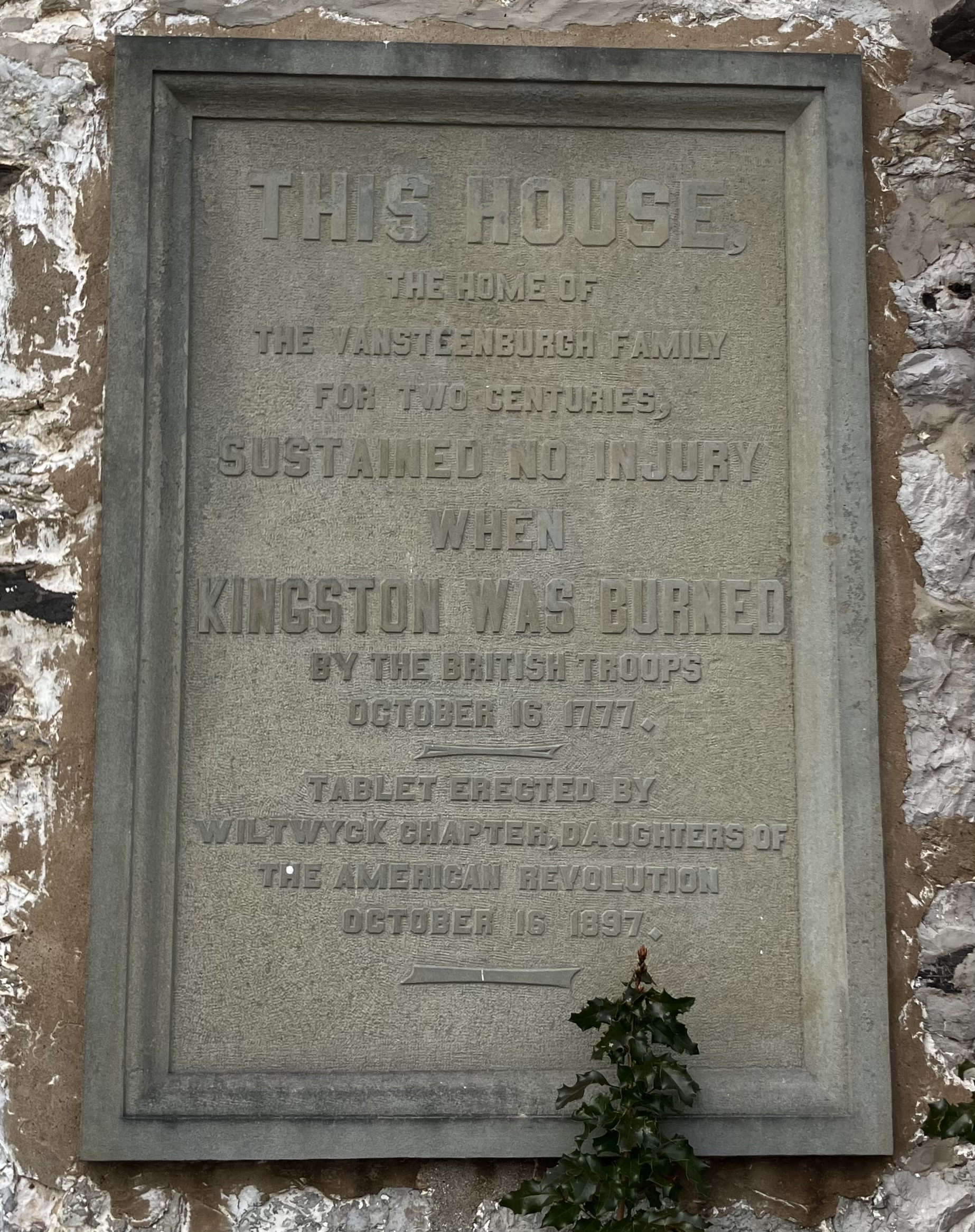
Marker placed in 1897 to note the survival of this house in 1777 when British troops burned Kingston

The house remained in the Van Steenburgh family until the mid-19th century. In 1897, on the 120th anniversary of the burning, the local Daughters of the American Revolution chapter placed the plaque in the front wall. In 1930 local architect Henry Graiser built the rear addition, carefully designed to be sympathetic and non-intrusive to the original house. There have been no significant changes to the building since.

== See also ==
- National Register of Historic Places listings in Ulster County, New York
