= O+ Festival =

American nonprofit organization

The O+ Festival is a 501c3 nonprofit organization that hosts festivals of art and music in cities around the United States. The organization is headquartered in Kingston, New York, where the first three-day, multi-venue festival launched in 2010. During the annual event, all participating artists and musicians exchange their contributions to the festival programming for free and discounted health and wellness services from a volunteer-staffed "pop-up clinic," serving as a "band-aid solution to unaffordable health care for the creative community."

== About O+ Festival ==
The O+ mission states that its aim is to foster "complete physical, mental, and social well-being by connecting artists directly with a coalition of health care providers and health resources, in a shared vision to nurture the individual and the community,".

Participating artists and musicians submit intake forms along with their stage plots, and are paid for their performances and artworks in health services: dental work, addiction counseling, cancer screenings, physical therapy and more, during a weekend triage clinic staffed by doctors who opt to treat artists outside the system, with case-by-case opportunities for follow-up care. Some health care providers who volunteer their time at the clinic have said they participate because they recognize the value of art as equivalent in a community to the services they provide. One opinion among expressed by a clinic volunteer is that artists "contribute so much to what makes a community worth living in."

O+ is working toward national expansion with a Bay Area festival, the first of which took place in the Mission District, San Francisco in November 2013, and will move to Petaluma, California in November 2014. Artists, musicians, and physicians from Philadelphia, Minneapolis, Nashville, Berkeley, and Lowell, Massachusetts, have contacted O+ looking to replicate the model. "It seems like something that should be everywhere and could definitely be everywhere," says Julia Henderson, a 32-year-old writer and development coordinator at a San Francisco theater who hopes to bring O+ to Berkeley.

In Kingston in 2012, the event drew 2000 attendees who were treated to the work of 45 visual artists and 35 bands (note: 150 musical acts applied for these spots). A record $78,000 in care was given by 85 healthcare providers and four dentists. The 2013 festival provided health, dental and wellness services that they valued at more than $95,000.

== History ==
After attending the Truck America Festival (a stateside branch of the UK Truck Festival) in the spring of 2010 in Big Indian, New York, local dentist Thomas F. Cingel DDS contacted an indie rock act from the roster, Monogold, and asked them if they would play a show in his home town of Kingston in exchange for free dental care. This unusual offer reached the band's manager, who asked a friend and music writer who was living in Kingston, Alexandra Marvar, if she was acquainted with Cingel. She reached out to him. Weeks later, Dr. Cingel met Joe Concra, Kingston property owner and friend of Marvar, at a party. Concra shared his vision of hosting a similar music festival in Kingston, and Cingel shared his vision of trading dentistry for musical performance. Inspired, Concra then contacted local doctor Dr. Art Chandler and discussed the possibility of exchanging other forms of health care for artistic performance. Chandler was optimistic about helping organize a broader corps of art-loving health care providers in the Hudson Valley to staff what would become the O+ pop-up clinic.

At the first meeting, the name O+ was introduced by Concra's wife, artist Denise Orzo. In part, it referenced the blood type of the universal donor, which was thought to be O positive (actually, it's O negative, but that doesn't sound as good). Concra, Marvar, Orzo, Cingel, and Chandler spearheaded the branding and initial planning, and within weeks, a committee was formed which included those founders and several artist and doctor friends to plan the festival. Five months later, over Columbus Day weekend, they hosted the first annual O+ Festival in venues throughout the Kingston Stockade District, the roster of which included Monogold, Phosphorescent, Nicole Atkins, and others.

== Notable participants ==
=== Musicians ===
Spiritualized
Lucius
Richard Buckner
The Felice Brothers
Phosphorescent (band)
Freeman, aka Gene Ween
Nicole Atkins
Dan Bern
Jay Ungar
Ida
Kevin Devine
Sara Lee
Members of Mercury Rev
Hopewell

=== Artists ===
Linda Montano
Peter Hutton
Gaia
LMNOPi
Nils Westergard
Jack Dishel
VOR138
