= Kirkland Hotel =

- U.S. National Register of Historic Places
- U.S. Historic district – Contributing property
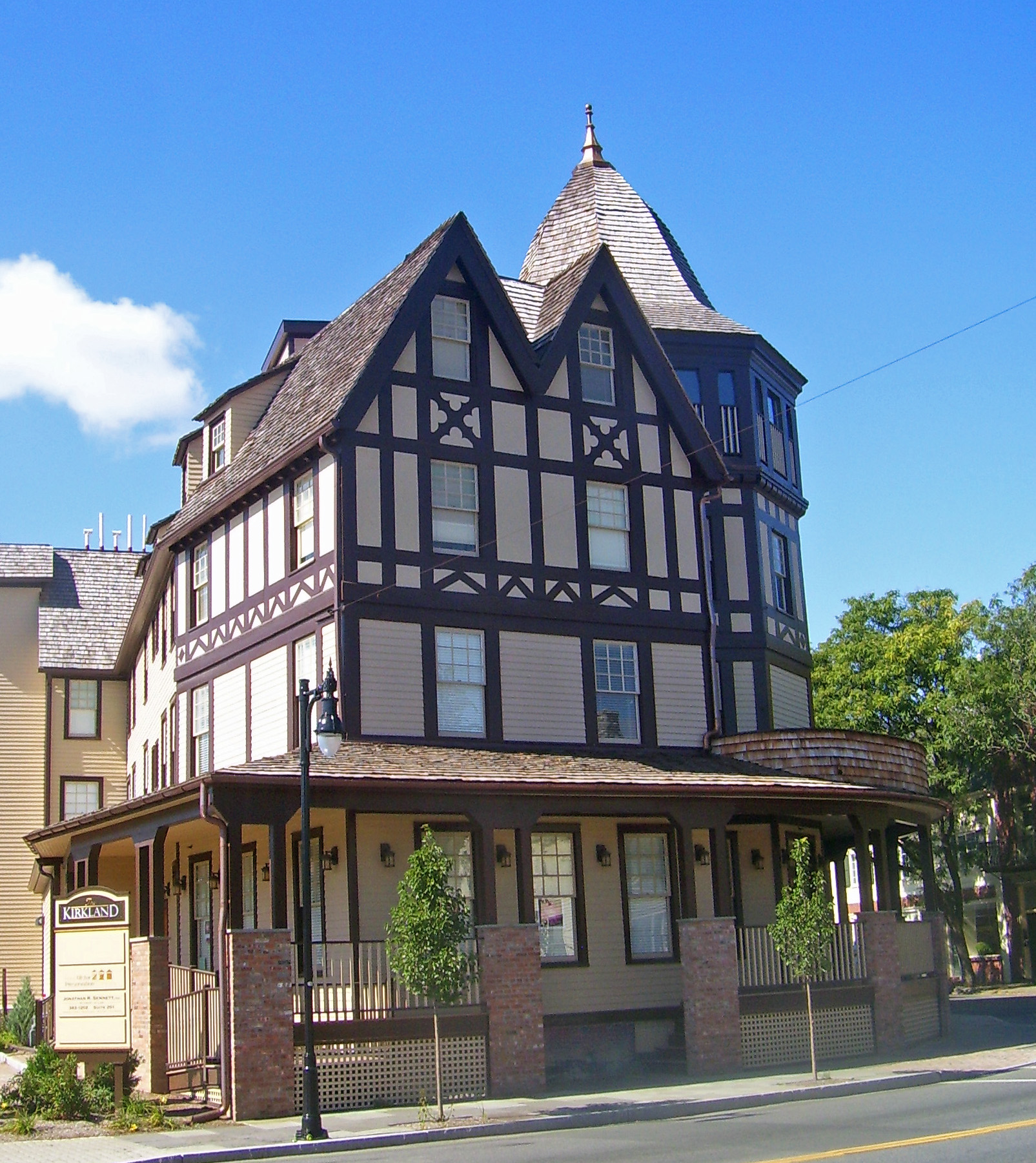
- North elevation and east profile, 2008
- Location: Kingston, NY
- Coordinates: 41°55′59″N 74°0′59″W
- Built: 1899
- Architectural style: Tudorbethan
- Part of: Kingston Stockade District (ID75001231)
- NRHP reference No.: 02001323

Significant dates
- Added to NRHP: November 15, 2002
- Designated CP: June 19, 1975

The Kirkland Hotel is located at the corner of Main Street and Clinton Avenue in Kingston, New York, United States. It is a Tudor-style building dating to the end of the 19th century.

It is a rare surviving example of a wood-frame urban hotel. From the middle of the 20th century to the early 1970s it was also a popular local restaurant. After it closed, redevelopment efforts stalled for several decades and it was almost demolished at one point. Today it is used as office space and apartments after being redeveloped. It was listed on the National Register of Historic Places on November 15, 2002, also becoming recognized as a contributing property to the Kingston Stockade District. After its redevelopment, it was recognized with a statewide preservation award.

== Building ==
The building is situated on an irregularly shaped lot on the east edge of uptown Kingston, outside the Stockade District. On the east is a garage in a similar style; to the south is an Ulster County office building. The neighborhood is urban, although not densely developed; the Old Dutch Church is a block and a half south along Main Street.

The hotel's main block is a trapezoid-shaped four-story frame building on a stone and brick foundation. A tower rises above the entry on the northwest. The roof is a complex series of intersecting steeply pitched gables.

On the west side, along Main Street, are two three-bay gabled blocks with another entrance in between them. A porch with steeply pitched roof wraps around the entire building at the first story. The main entrance is at the base of a tower on the northeast corner, topped with a cupola and finial. The north facade, along Clinton Avenue, has paired gables. The east and south have no decoration.

Inside the original layout remains mostly intact. Walls are finished in the original lath and plaster. A stair with metal newels and turned balusters connects all floors.

== History ==
The hotel's site had been a lumberyard from 1876 to 1885. In 1899 Margaret Conklin purchased the land and built the hotel in the relatively new Tudorbethan architectural style, very different from the mostly conservative, restrained styles hotels of the time were built in. It catered to guests doing business with the county, whose courthouse and offices are nearby.

Conklin sold the hotel in 1917 to George and Jane Holms, who in turn sold it to Samuel and Alice Saulpaugh five years later, in 1922. The Saulpaughs are credited with giving the hotel its name. They sold it to another couple, John and Mary Eagen, three years later. The Eagens operated the hotel until 1948, then sold to Max and Ruth Brugmann in 1950.

The Brugmanns began operating the Dutch Rathskeller restaurant and bar in the hotel basement. In 1968, they ended the hotel operations, and four years later, in 1972, shut down the restaurant. Later that year, the front porch and tower cupola were removed.

In 1976 another owner opened the Cleaver Steakhouse in the basement space. It failed later that year. In the mid-1980s, as it passed through a succession of owners trying to redevelop it, the city attempted to designate it a landmark, but its Landmarks and Historic Preservation Commission never approved.

Yet another owner repainted it cream and green in 1988 but was unable to complete any other work. In 1996 it reverted to the city, and at one point it was slated for demolition to make way for a county parking garage. In 2002 the Rural Ulster Preservation Company (RUPCO), a local non-profit organization specializing in community development, bought the property with the support of the city's mayor and restored it, including the cupola and front porch, helped by a grant from NeighborWorks America. Hillary Clinton, then one of New York's U.S. senators, strongly supported the project, helping RUPCO obtain other financing.

Ultimately the project cost $4.7 million. At one point it was over budget by $500,000, and was under fire for RUPCO's use of non-union labor. RUPCO was able to install a geothermal heating system, saving money and making the redeveloped building greener.

The basement restaurant has been refurbished for a potential owner. It was then designated a city landmark prior to its listing on the Register. RUPCO currently rents out the space for commercial and residential purposes, as well as events. In 2007 the restored hotel was one of several projects honored with the Excellence in Preservation Award given annually by the New York State Preservation League.

== See also ==
- National Register of Historic Places listings in Ulster County, New York
