= The Tappen House =

House in Kingston, Ulster County, New York

Coordinates: 41°55′57.9″N 74°1′14.6″W

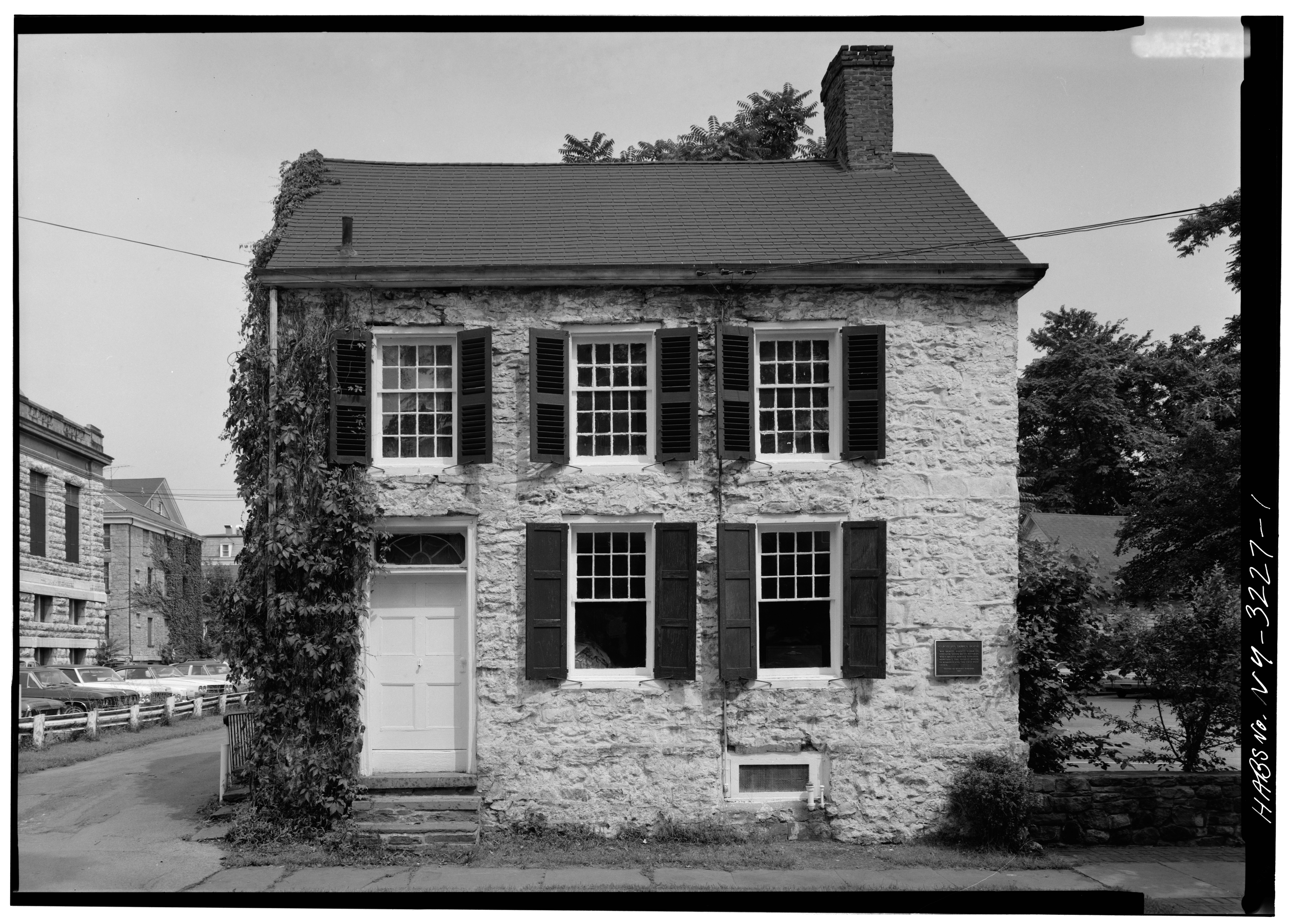
Front elevation in 1973

The Cornelius Tappen House, also known as the Vandenburgh-Hasbrouck House, is located in the Kingston Stockade District in Kingston, New York.

Designed and built as a salt-box style house, the Tappen building was constructed with uncut stones, an example of a "rubble" house. It was built sometime before the American Revolution, burned in 1777, and rebuilt later.

Following the 1777 fire the house was rebuilt and became Kingston's first post office.

Throughout the years the Tappen house was passed through many families until the 1970s. Slated for demolition as part of uptown urban development, the house was rescued by Heritage Savings bank who restored the building for use as a banking facility.
