= Red goats of Kingston =

2011 graffiti in Kingston, New York

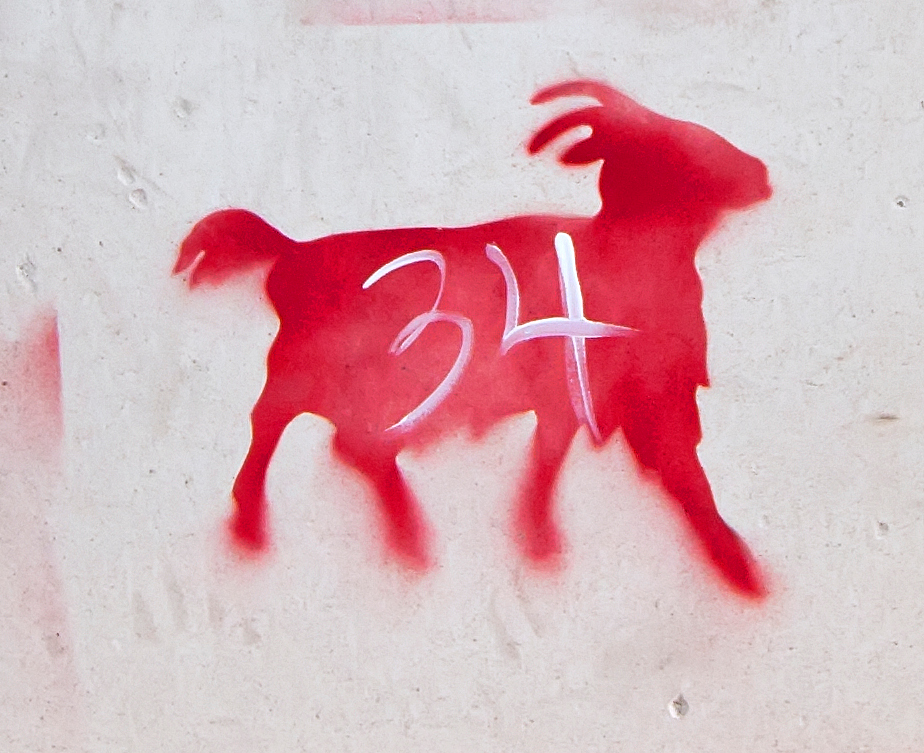
One of many red goats which appeared in the Kingston Stockade District

The red goats of Kingston is a controversial public art display which appeared in the stockade district of Kingston, New York, in October 2011. The artists responsible for the goats, which were stenciled on newly installed planters in front of area businesses, were apprehended and charged with several crimes. One, the owner of a tattoo shop in the area, had publicly praised the unknown vandals. His Facebook page showed a picture of a very similar goat that he had tattooed on several people in exchange for $37.

Speculation that the graffiti was placed by opponents of the Pike Plan project was not supported by the suspects' testimony. Nevertheless, a debate emerged about whether to preserve the stencils as art or remove them as vandalism. The goats were removed by the contractors renovating the neighborhood.

== History and appearance ==
The red goats are stencils which were painted onto a number of white planters and other locations around Kingston's Stockade District from October 24–26, 2011. Varying reports claim that 32, 33, or 38 football-sized red goat stencils appeared throughout the uptown area. The goats were placed on eleven planters which had been installed as part of a renovation project known as the Pike Plan, just prior to the project's dedication. Numbers were painted over the goat stencilled designs the following night.

The Pike Plan is a renovation project which is largely focused on restoring canopies which had originally been installed on uptown Kingston buildings in the 1970s; critics of the project advocated instead for removing them and using the funds for other projects. It is named for John Pike, the artist who originally designed the canopies. Many of the property owners who advocated the removal of the canopies, rather than their restoration, did not feel that the project had a thorough public hearing. The cost of maintenance of the canopies is raised by means of a special tax assessment on the owners of the 39 properties affected. The large, white sidewalk planters upon which most of the goats appeared were only a small part of the larger renovation plan.

The goats were first covered with plastic sheeting, and then removed with paint thinner; the process involved replacing the sealer on the planters, and was estimated to cost $5,000. Despite the original icons being covered, figures of the red goats were included in the parade which celebrated the completion of the plan.

== Investigation and arrests ==
Two local artists, Geddes Paulsen and Maggie Salesman, were brought up on charges by Kingston police on November 9. Each was charged with third-degree criminal mischief, a felony, and making graffiti, a misdemeanor. The charges can bring up to four years' prison time.

Salesman confessed after being confronted with security camera footage which was recorded from an undisclosed location. She was released on an appearance ticket. Despite the confession, police were not able to determine the significance of the numbers which were painted on the goats.

Paulsen, who owned a tattoo parlor on Wall Street, praised the "Red Goat Vandal". He said he had tattooed seven red goats at a cost of $37 each. One of the tattoos, which Paulsen posted on his Facebook page, was said to be similar to the original design.

== Reactions ==
Bloods, Crips, goats – it's all the same.

— Alderman Tom Hoffay, Daily Freeman

The stenciled goats were deemed graffiti by critics, including project planners and some local business owners.

Kingston Mayor James Sottile characterized the goats as defacement, and expressed hopes that the "suspects be ordered to remove all graffiti from the city with a toothbrush should be they convicted". Before the suspects were arrested, alderman Tom Hoffay likened the goats to gang graffiti, telling one area newspaper, "Bloods, Crips, goats – it's all the same." Hoffay further speculated that the goats were painted by people opposed to the controversial Pike Plan, which called for the restoration of canopies which opponents wished to have removed. One such opponent, Eric Francis Coppolino, called the remarks "inappropriate" and said that referring to the goats as "a political statement is an overreach." The suspects were later said to have been motivated by boredom.

Some residents advocated preserving the goats, likening them to officially sanctioned public art projects in other municipalities. Local business owners collected some 50 signatures on a petition to preserve the goats as a permanent installation. The goats became the subject of a Facebook page, tattoos, and a drink special; one area business owner placed the stencil on his store's facade. Several products with the red goat icon were made available for purchase in a shop on the web site Etsy.

In an editorial, the Daily Freeman said, "[W]e lean toward the opinion of the community members who have wondered how funny those inclined to defend the act would think it if the targets had been their cars or homes." Of the goats themselves, however, the editorial stated:

In truth, we found the goats to be curiosities – "Did you say 'red goats'?!" – and aesthetically inoffensive. Which is not at all to pass legal judgment.

— Editorial board, Daily Freeman

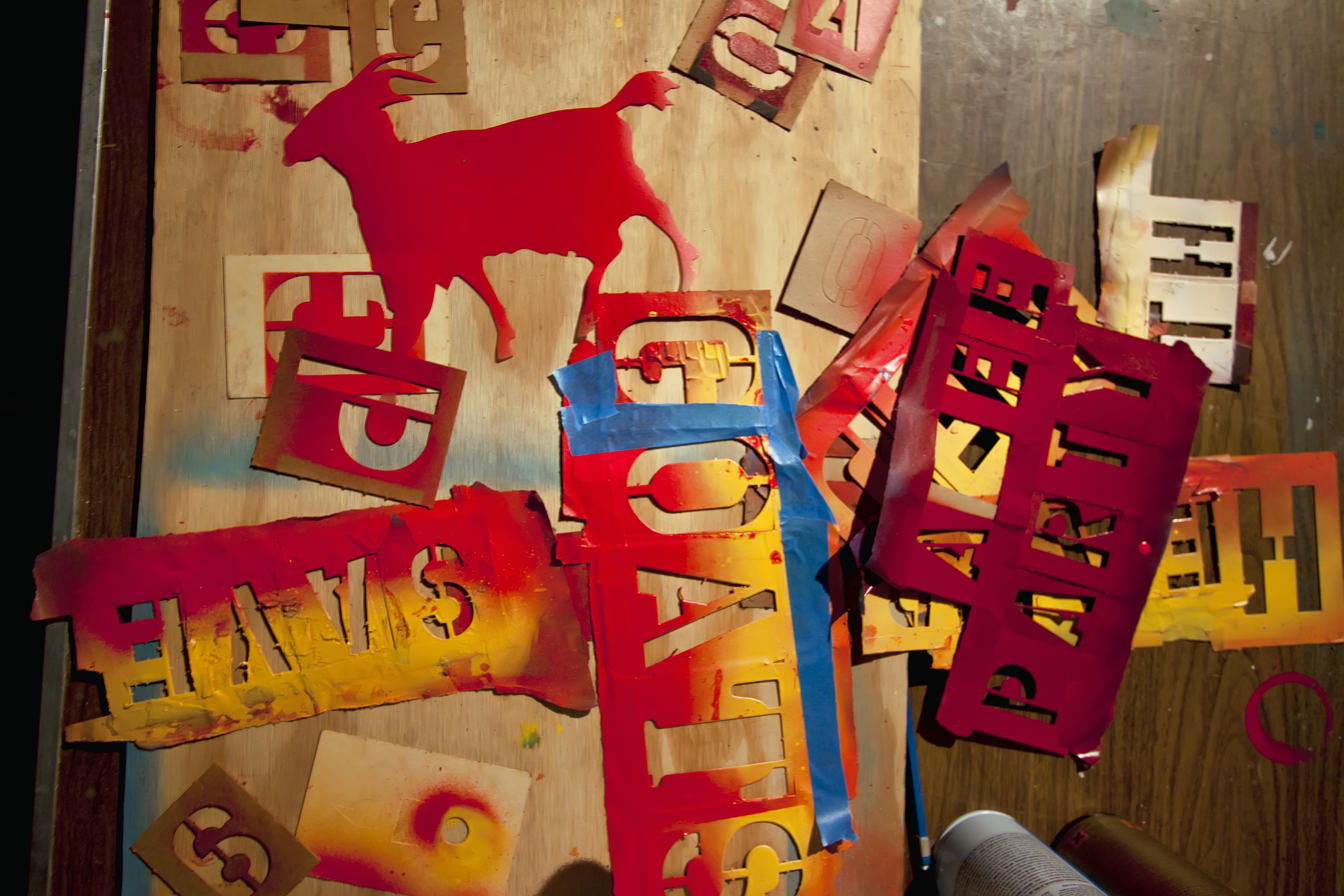
Red goat icon incorporated into "save the goats" artwork

The editorial went on to say that "the spray painting was certainly an undemocratic act," but that "We are struck, however, by the fact that, if convicted, the alleged perpetrators face up to 4 years in state prison, the same amount of time that Dr. Conrad Murray can get for causing the death of the singer Michael Jackson."

Reactions of residents and area business owners to the goats were mixed, focusing on both the aesthetic appeal of the stencils and the violation of law which they represented. Some condemned the paintings as vandalism, with one suggesting that the perpetrators be given community service to "put those powers to good instead of evil." Others viewed the goats as representative of the feeling of frustration shared by many community members over the renovation project itself.
