= Senate House State Historic Site =

Historic site in Kingston, New York

- Senate House
- U.S. National Register of Historic Places
- U.S. Historic district – Contributing property
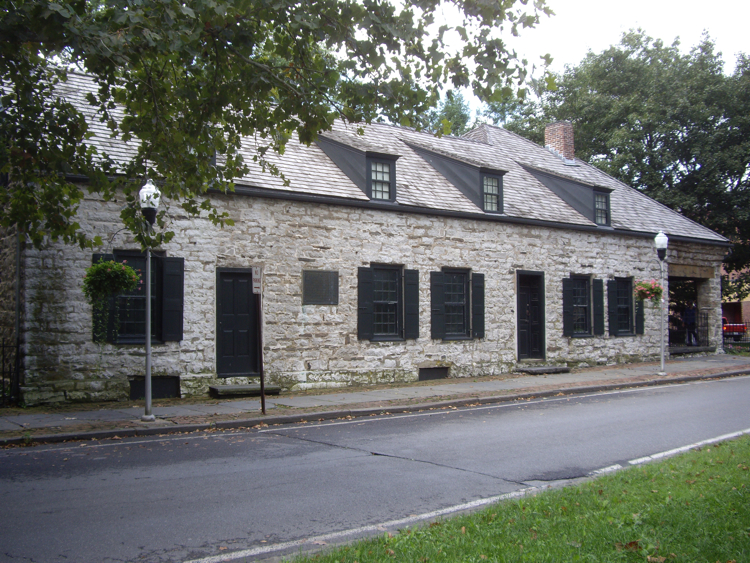
- North elevation, 2007

- Location within New York Location within the United States
- Location: Kingston, New York
- Coordinates: 41°56′6.28″N 74°1′8.8″W
- Built: 1676
- Architectural style: Dutch Colonial
- Part of: Kingston Stockade District
- NRHP reference No.: 71000564
- Added to NRHP: August 12, 1971

The Senate House State Historic Site is located on Fair Street in Kingston, New York, United States. During the Revolutionary War, New York's First Constitutional Convention met in Kingston, where it adopted the first New York State Constitution on April 20th, 1777. Upon being elected, the first New York State Senate met in the home of local merchant Abraham Van Gaasbeek, which is today referred to as Senate House.

After roughly one month, the Senate, along with the rest of the new government was forced to flee from advancing British troops just prior to the Burning of Kingston on October 16th 1777. Since it was established as a State Historic Site in 1887, Senate House has served as a historic house museum. The site now includes a museum building in addition to the historic house, as well as a number of other contributing structures. It is currently it is owned and operated by the New York State Office of Parks, Recreation and Historic Preservation.

In 1971 it was listed on the National Register of Historic Places, the first building in Kingston listed. At that time it was a contributing property to the small Clinton Avenue Historic District. Four years later, in 1975, the original district was replaced with the larger Kingston Stockade District, which retained the Senate House and all the other properties of the original district.

The house first belonged to Wessel Wesselse Ten Broeck, born about 1636, who emigrated to New Amsterdam from Wessen, in Westphalia in 1659. It is generally described as having been built in 1676, but can be certainly dated to some time before his death in 1704. The ground floor of the house consists of three rooms, lined up along the street, with an entrance hallway between two of the rooms. As is typical of early Dutch houses in the Hudson Valley, the house is of stone, with the exception of the rear wall which is brick, laid in Flemish bond.

== See also ==
- List of New York State Historic Sites
- List of the oldest buildings in New York
- National Register of Historic Places listings in Ulster County, New York
