= Kingston Stockade District =

Historic district in New York, United States

- U.S. National Register of Historic Places
- U.S. Historic district
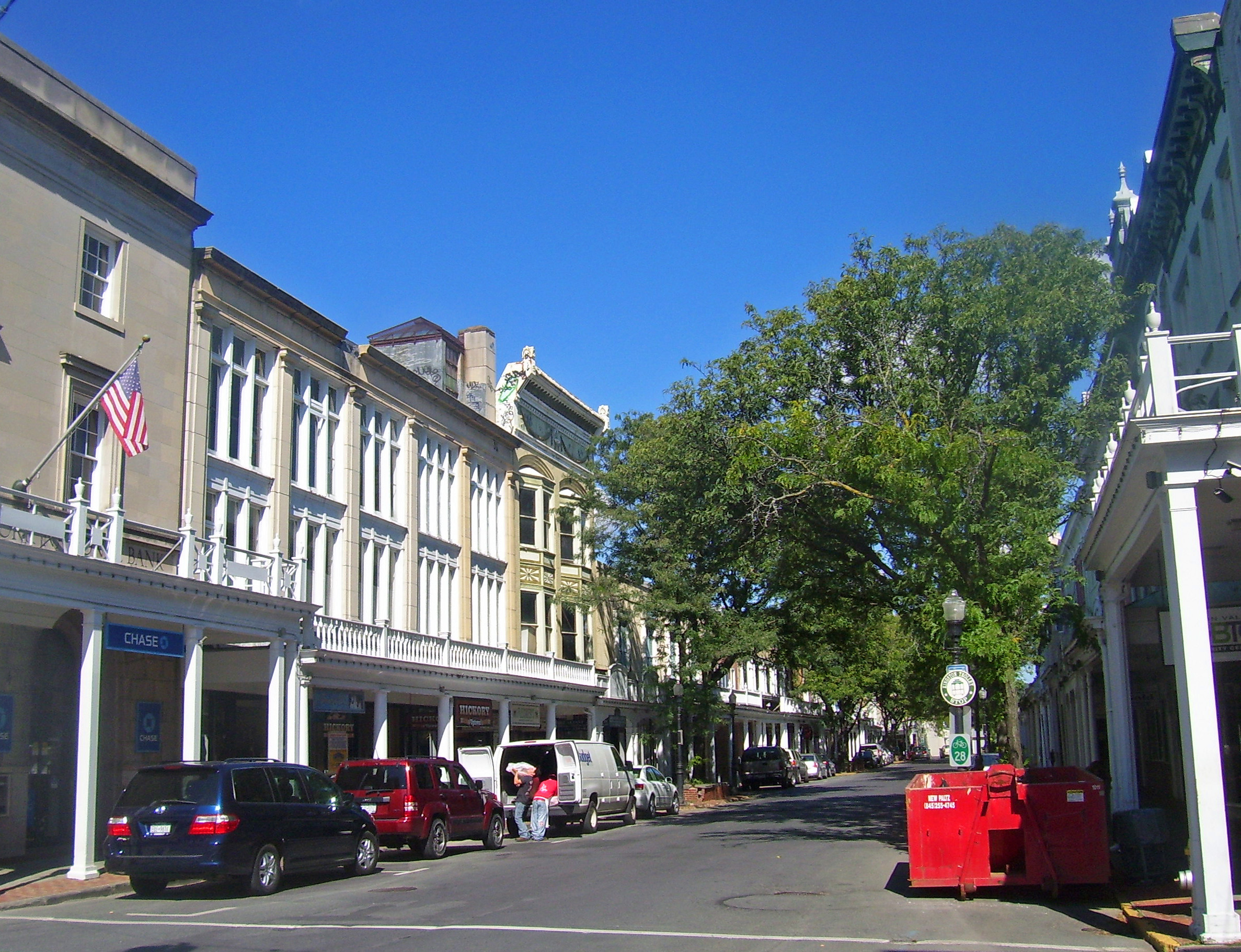
- View north along Wall Street from John Street intersection, 2008

- Location within New York Location within the United States
- Interactive map showing the location for Kingston Stockade District
- Location: Kingston, NY
- Coordinates: 41°56′1″N 74°1′10″W
- Area: 32 acres (13 ha)
- Built: 17th-19th centuries
- NRHP reference No.: 70000434; 75001231
- Added to NRHP: February 5, 1970; June 19, 1975

The Kingston Stockade District is an eight-block area in the western section of Kingston, New York, United States, commonly referred to as Uptown Kingston. It is the original site of the mid-17th century Dutch settlement of Wiltwyck, which was later renamed Kingston when it passed to English control.

It is the only one of three original Dutch settlements in New York surrounded by stockades where the outline of the stockade is still evident due to the raised ground. Within the area are many historic buildings from the 17th, 18th and 19th centuries, including the original Ulster County courthouse, the Senate House where the state of New York was established in 1777, and the Old Dutch Church, designed by Minard Lafever in 1852 and designated as a National Historic Landmark. Its steeple is considered a symbol of the city. Some buildings survived the burning of Kingston by British forces during the Revolutionary War. The intersection of Crown and John streets has Colonial-era Dutch stone houses on all four corners, the only intersection in the country where this is so.

In 1970 the area in the vicinity of the Senate House was listed on the National Register of Historic Places as the Clinton Avenue Historic District. Five years later, as the historic value of the entire uptown area became apparent, the larger Stockade District was created, subsuming the original one. The formal recognition of its historic importance has led to contentious battles in local government over proposals to redevelop the area.

== Geography ==
The Stockade District is parallelogram-shaped, with its boundaries defined as the rear property lines of lots on the far side of North Front Street on the north, Green Street on the west, Main Street on the south and Clinton Avenue on the east. Crown Street is entirely within the district, as are the intersecting segments of Fair, John and Wall streets. It also extends slightly along Frog Alley to take in the Lowe-Bogardus ruin and an interpretive exhibit with some of the original stockade at Frog Alley on the northwest corner. The total area is 32 acres (13 ha).

The district is split between residential and commercial use. The former dominates the western half of the district, while the commercial properties are on the east. The densely developed block of Wall Street between John and North Front streets has flat wooden roofs over its sidewalks, a distinctive touch not common in New York. The block of Wall to the south is dominated by the old county courthouse and the Old Dutch Church, whose cemetery and yard is apart from the Senate House State Park, the only significant green space in the district. There are also many parking lots between buildings in this area.

To the north and east the neighborhoods are primarily commercial. The city's football stadium is a short distance to the west, where the neighborhood is residential, as it also is on the south.

It is a short distance from the two major approaches to the city of Kingston from the west and the New York State Thruway. Washington Avenue is a block to the west. Both Interstate 587 and NY 28 end at Albany Avenue (NY 32) a short distance to the east. No major roads or streets go through the Stockade District.

== History ==
From its founding in the mid-17th century to the creation of the modern city of Kingston in 1872, the history of the Stockade District is the history of Kingston. Most of its older buildings were restored and rebuilt in the years after the 1777 burning of the village by the British, and its historic character has been made diverse as significant buildings were erected throughout the 19th century. Late 20th century preservation efforts have led to some confrontations between the city and its residents in recent years.

=== 1652–1783: Colonial and Revolutionary eras ===
Kingston began as the Dutch village of Wiltwijck, founded by Thomas Chambers of Fort Orange (later Albany) in 1652. The site, on a high plain near the drainage of Rondout Creek, was chosen for the ease with which it could be defended. Other colonists came to the area despite regular Indian raids.

Six years later, by 1658, Dutch colonial governor Peter Stuyvesant ordered all settlers to move to the village, behind the stockade whose construction he personally supervised. It was burned in 1663 and rebuilt, remaining until the early 18th century. By then it had established the street pattern along its boundaries which persists today. At its northwest corner, where the log palisade formed a bastion on a bluff that remains today, it was especially defensible.

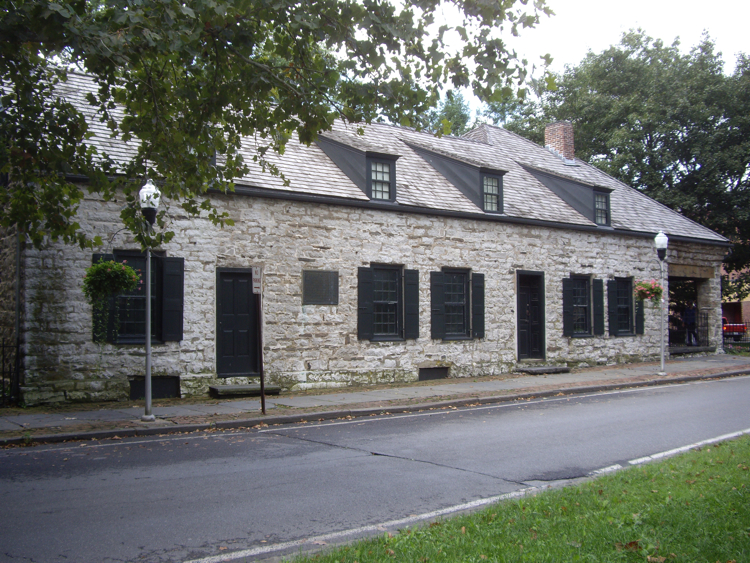
The Senate House, where the state of New York was founded.

In 1777, it was chosen to host the constitutional convention that established New York State. George Clinton was chosen the first governor, and John Jay, later the first Chief Justice of the United States, opened the first term of the New York Supreme Court in Kingston.

Later that year, the British under General John Vaughan took the lightly defended settlement by surprise and burned it. A total of 326 buildings inside and outside of the stockade were destroyed, with only a handful, such as the Tobias Van Steenburgh House, remaining untouched. The city was rebuilt along the lines previous established by the stockade. Five years later, George Washington visited Kingston. On a tour of the city's boundaries, he expressed appreciation for Stuyvesant's foresight in having the stockade built. In 1783, as the war was ending, New York proposed Kingston as a national capital.

=== 1784–1908: Buildup and early preservation ===
In the early 19th century, the area continued to grow. New commercial buildings were erected in the styles such as Federal architecture Greek Revival popular in the century's early decades. A new county courthouse, the current building, was built in 1818 on the site of the first one. The First Protestant Reformed Dutch Church of Kingston, the city's oldest congregation, dating to 1659, went through two buildings before the construction of its current home, the 1852 Minard Lafever edifice known as the Old Dutch Church. Its white tower rises over 200 feet above the district and is a city landmark.

Later in the century the villages of Kingston and Rondout merged into the current city. Rondout had grown from being at the northern end of the Delaware and Hudson Canal since 1825 and its commercial center on the banks of Rondout Creek near where it flows into the Hudson River became known as "downtown" to distinguish itself from the Stockade District, which accordingly became "uptown".

Historic preservation efforts in the Stockade began early in the 20th century. The Henry Sleight House on Crown Street had been used for many purposes since it was built around 1695, but by 1900 it was decrepit and in danger of demolition. The local Daughters of the American Revolution chapter paid for a complete restoration of the interior and exterior. Today it is their headquarters. A few years later, in 1908, George Clinton, long buried in Washington, was brought back to Kingston and reburied in the yard of the Old Dutch Church with full honors.

=== 20th century: Organized preservation ===
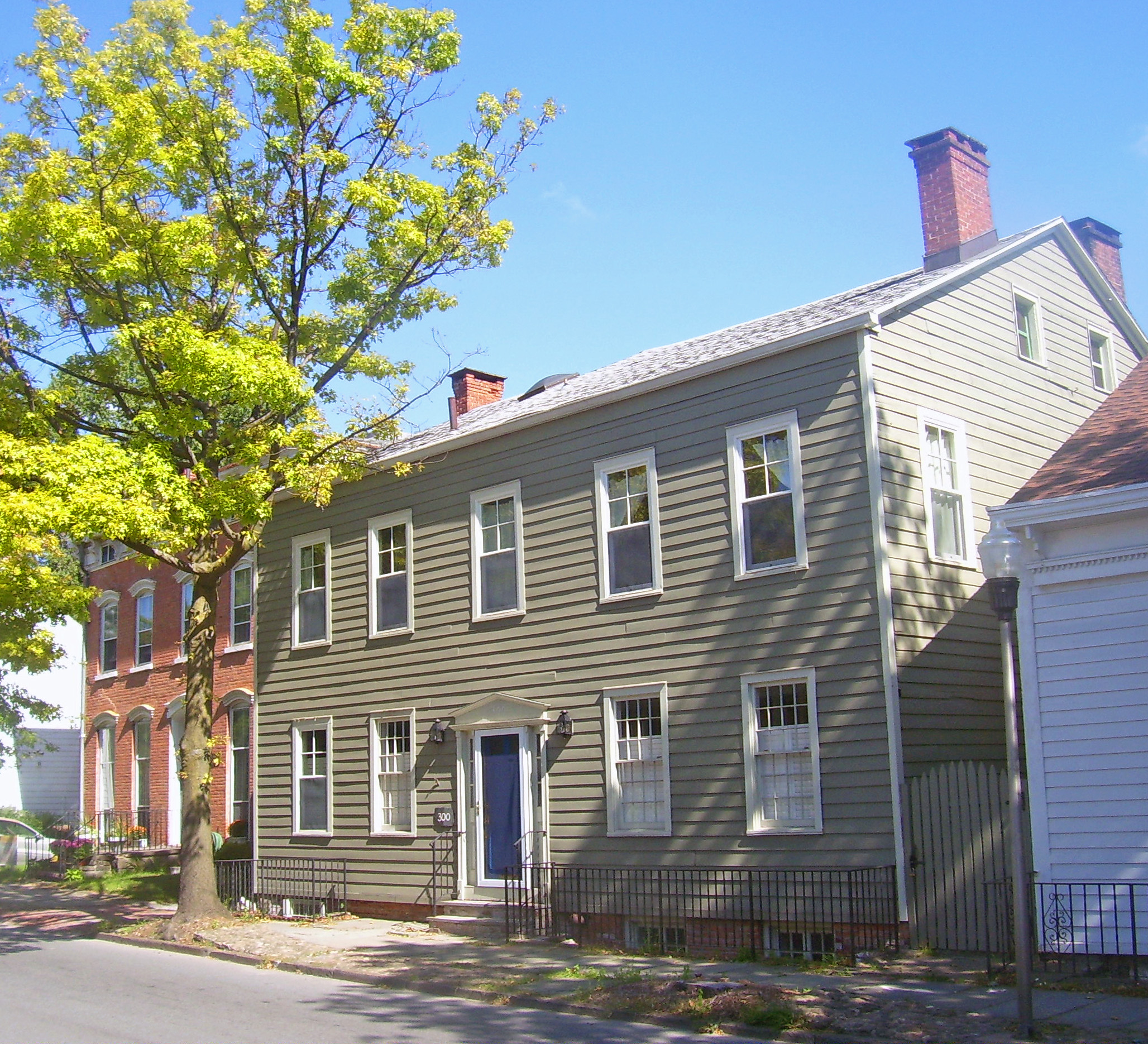
South Smith House on Clinton Avenue

Decades later, in 1965, Friends of the Senate House was founded to work to protect and preserve that building. It soon expanded its mission to all the city's historic architecture and became Friends of Historic Kingston (FOHK). In 1969 it got the original Clinton Avenue Historic District, consisting of the block between Clinton, North Fair, and John streets and Westbrook Lane, locally recognized as a historic district, the city's first listing on the National Register.

Four years later it was expanded into the Stockade District. FOHK has worked to get other properties in the Stockade recognized as well, and renovated some others. It also maintains the Frog Alley area at the district's northwest corner.

During the 1970s, the roofs were added to the sidewalks on North Front and Wall streets, part of the "Pike Plan" (named after Woodstock artist John Pike, who designed and built them) to revitalize the area, which had begun to lose shoppers to malls outside of the city. Businesses on those streets pay a maintenance fee for them. Some called for their removal, which the city did in 2026.

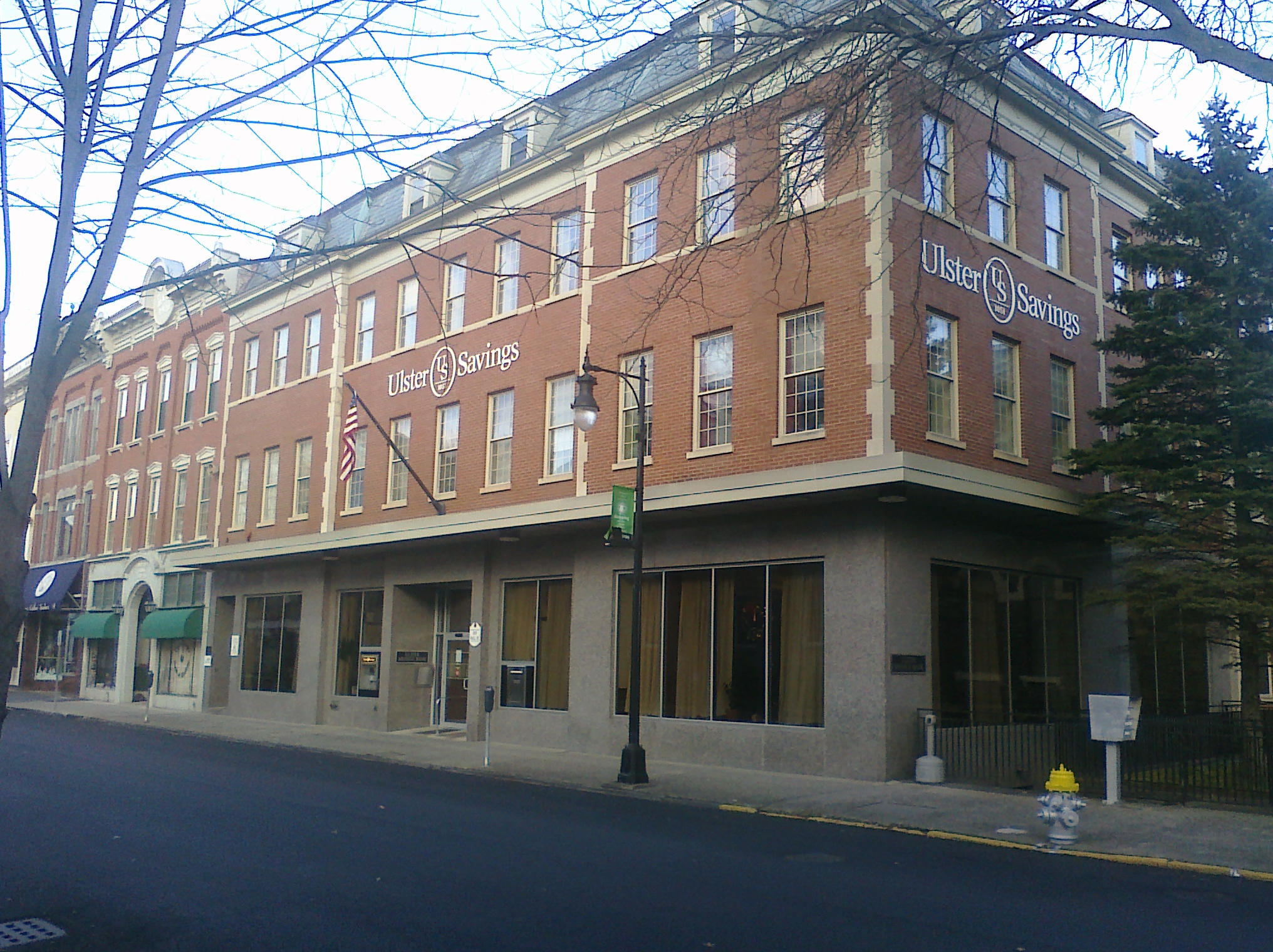
Ulster Savings Bank branch on Wall Street

=== 21st century: Preservation and redevelopment ===
In the early 21st century, the county sponsored an archaeological dig at the site of the Persen House, one of the four at the Crown-John intersection, as part of efforts to restore it and make it a museum. It yielded a number of artifacts, including some misshapen apparent cannonballs. Eight years later, in 2008, after having spent $2 million on the project the county was still unsure what to do with the building. It was hoping to use federal stimulus money to finish the work.

During the 2000s, preservationists and the city clashed over some projects slated for areas near or on the fringes of the district. A New Jersey developer's proposal for a 12-story condominium on the site of a closed parking garage the city planned to demolish on North Front Street drew objections for its height, as it would become the city's tallest building, dwarfing nearby historic buildings, and requiring a variance as Kingston's zoning code prohibits any new buildings in the Stockade District from being taller than the base of the Old Dutch Church's steeple, 62 feet (19 m) above street level. The city's attorney later decided that it would not need one since the parts of the proposed building that exceeded the height limit were outside the district boundary.

The state's Office of Parks, Recreation and Historic Preservation warned the city that such a towering building would have a negative impact on the Stockade District, and the state's Historic Preservation League put the Stockade on its "Seven to Save" list for 2007 because of the proposal. The city's mayor and proponents among the Stockade business community felt that the economic benefit the condo proposal would bring to the Stockade outweighed any effect it would have on the district's historic character. Eventually the developer began to reconsider the project due to the opposition,

With the project stalled, the city decided to survey residents about what should be built at the site. The results indicated strong opposition to affordable housing or any kind of rental units being built on the site. The parking garage was finally demolished amid allegations of bid rigging. A temporary parking lot has opened on the site.

At the time the condominium project was failing, in 2008, CVS Pharmacy proposed a 12,900-square-foot (1,200 m^{2}) store on Washington Avenue and Schwenk Drive. KingstonCitizens.org and preservationists collected 600 signatures on petitions opposing the development, saying a third chain drugstore in the uptown area would only drive an independent local drugstore on North Front Street out of business and make the city's main western gateway into a commercial strip indistinguishable from others in the country. One city alderman tried to stop the project with a building moratorium along Washington, which received the support of the Stockade's business association. It was eventually passed, excluding the CVS proposal. The city's Planning Board eventually approved the project, and construction crews began clearing the site in September 2009.

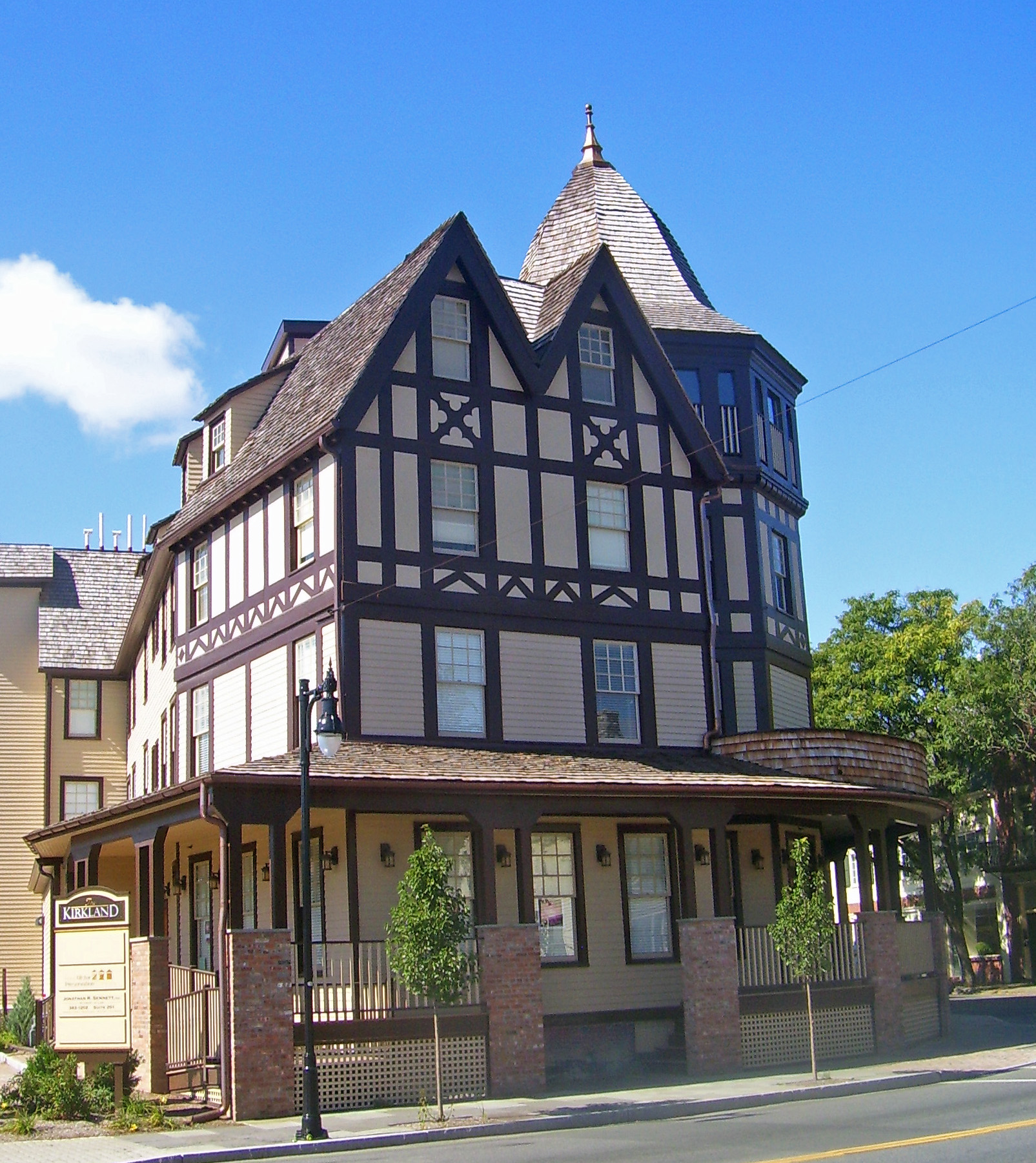
The Kirkland Hotel

The city and preservationists were able to work together on one project, the restoration of the 1899 Kirkland Hotel at Clinton Avenue and Main Street in the southeast corner of the district. A rare example of a wood-frame urban hotel, it had been vacant since the 1970s. Several owners since then had tried to at least reopen a restaurant in the hotel's basement, but had made no progress beyond repainting the exterior.

In 2003 the Rural Ulster Preservation Company (RUPCO), a local nonprofit organization devoted to housing, bought the hotel with the intention of completing the restoration. It spent $4.7 million over several years to restore the original porch and put in a geothermal heating system. The project won a 2007 Excellence in Preservation Award from the Historic Preservation League, and RUPCO has leased out space for commercial and residential use. It is hoping that someone will be able to reopen the restaurant.

The streets and sidewalks were also in need of repair. In 2008 Rep. Maurice Hinchey helped the city secure $1.3 million in federal grants to rehabilitate uptown and the Stockade District. $1.7 million had been set aside to restore the Pike Plan canopies, which were in need of repair. The following spring the city announced it would use some of the money to reverse the direction of traffic on several of the one-way streets within the district to ease travel through and around it. Later that year City council debated whether to restore the traffic light at North Front and Wall or keep the stop signs. They ultimately decided in favor of the traffic light. Just prior to completion of the canopy project, graffiti artists painted red goats on eleven of the new sidewalk planters, raising a furor. The two suspects face up to four years in prison for felony criminal mischief.

By 2020 the Pike Plan's canopies were again in need of repair. This time the cost would be higher, around $10 million, and the city instead decided it was time to take the canopies down. That project got underway in early 2026, at a cost of $2.67 million. Some local business owners who had opposed it due to the disruption it would cause were pleasantly surprised by the architectural features revealed. Among them were, on some facades, Luxfer glass tiles with distinctive designs by Frank Lloyd Wright, created in 1897. Owners of a group of three buildings decided to remove the siding rather than restore it and found distinctive designs, including a 1960s department store sign, beneath. The owner of one art gallery who had been skeptical says the removal of the canopies has made her business easier to find.

== Preservation ==
An entire section of Kingston's zoning code governs new construction in what it refers to as the Stockade Area. In its preamble the city council declares:

it is in the public interest to ensure that the distinctive and historical character of this Historic and Architectural Design District shall not be injuriously affected, that the value to the community of those buildings having architectural and historical worth shall not be impaired and that said ... [d]istrict be maintained and preserved to promote its use of the education, pleasure and welfare of the citizens of the City of Kingston, New York, and others ... This area contains the architecture of the past 300 years, and new development must not be allowed to erode the best of the architectural spaces and cultural association of the past.

The city's Landmarks Preservation Commission reviews applications for new construction, including significant alterations to existing structures, in the Stockade District. It may consider, and request modification of, many elements of the proposed construction, including roof shape, walls and paving, in the interest of protecting the Stockade's historic character. The height of new buildings is limited to 62 feet (19 m), or the base of the Old Dutch Church's steeple. The commission may also require the use of bluestone in sidewalks where it considers it historically appropriate, and that any newer construction be set back further from the street than neighboring historic buildings and screened from view with trees, possibly evergreens. Five percent of the area of all parking lots must be used for plantings to screen it.

Friends of Historic Kingston (FOHK), the group founded in the late 1960s to preserve the Senate House, has been a vocal defender of the Stockade's historic character. Its 400 members have actively opposed some recent projects that they believed would adversely affect the district, to the point that some critics have referred to the group as Friends of Hysteric Kingston or Enemies of Development. The group has also bought and restored some of the homes in the district, as well as elsewhere in the city. It operates two museums in the city and offers walking tours of the Stockade.

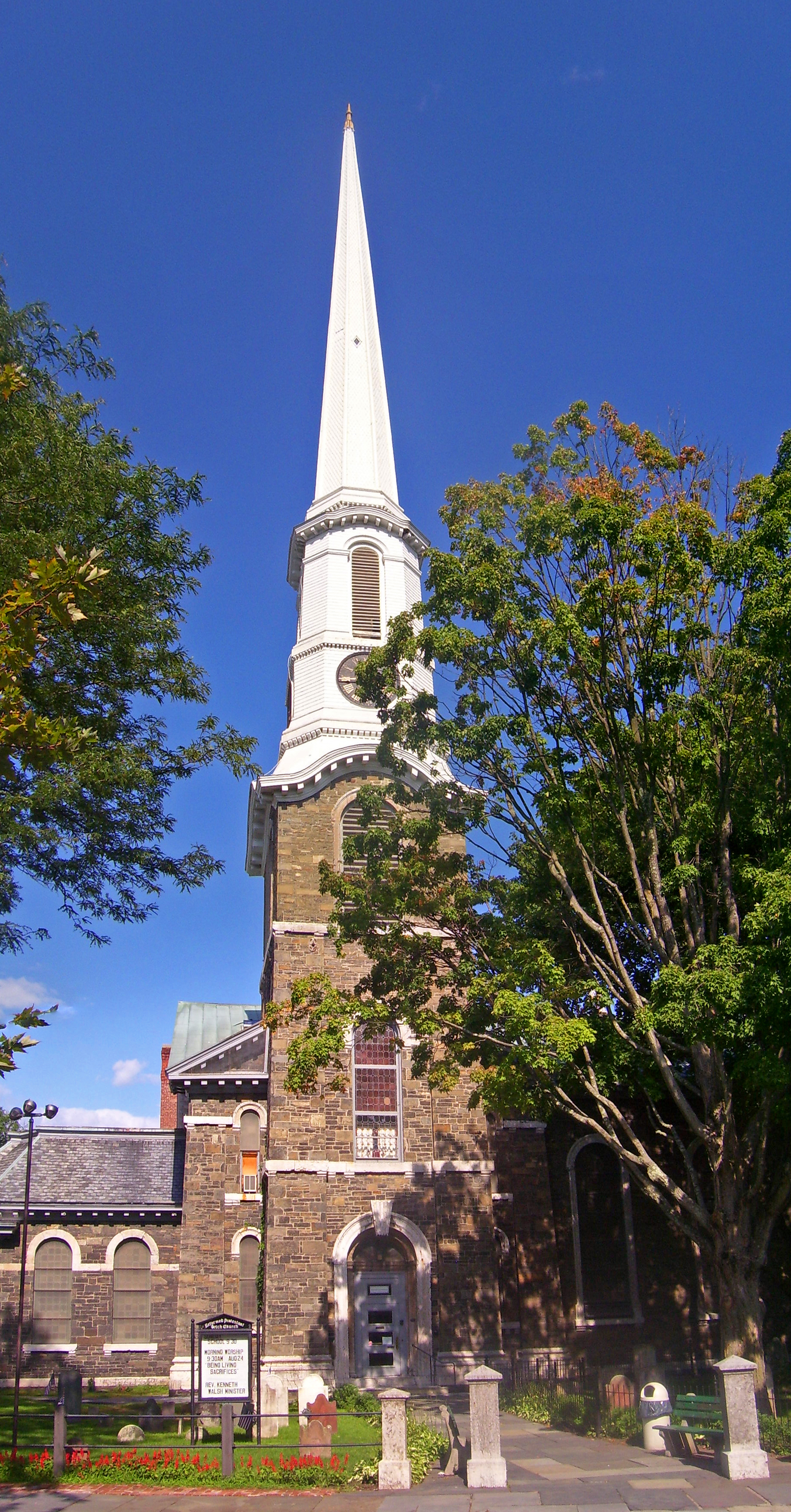
Old Dutch Church

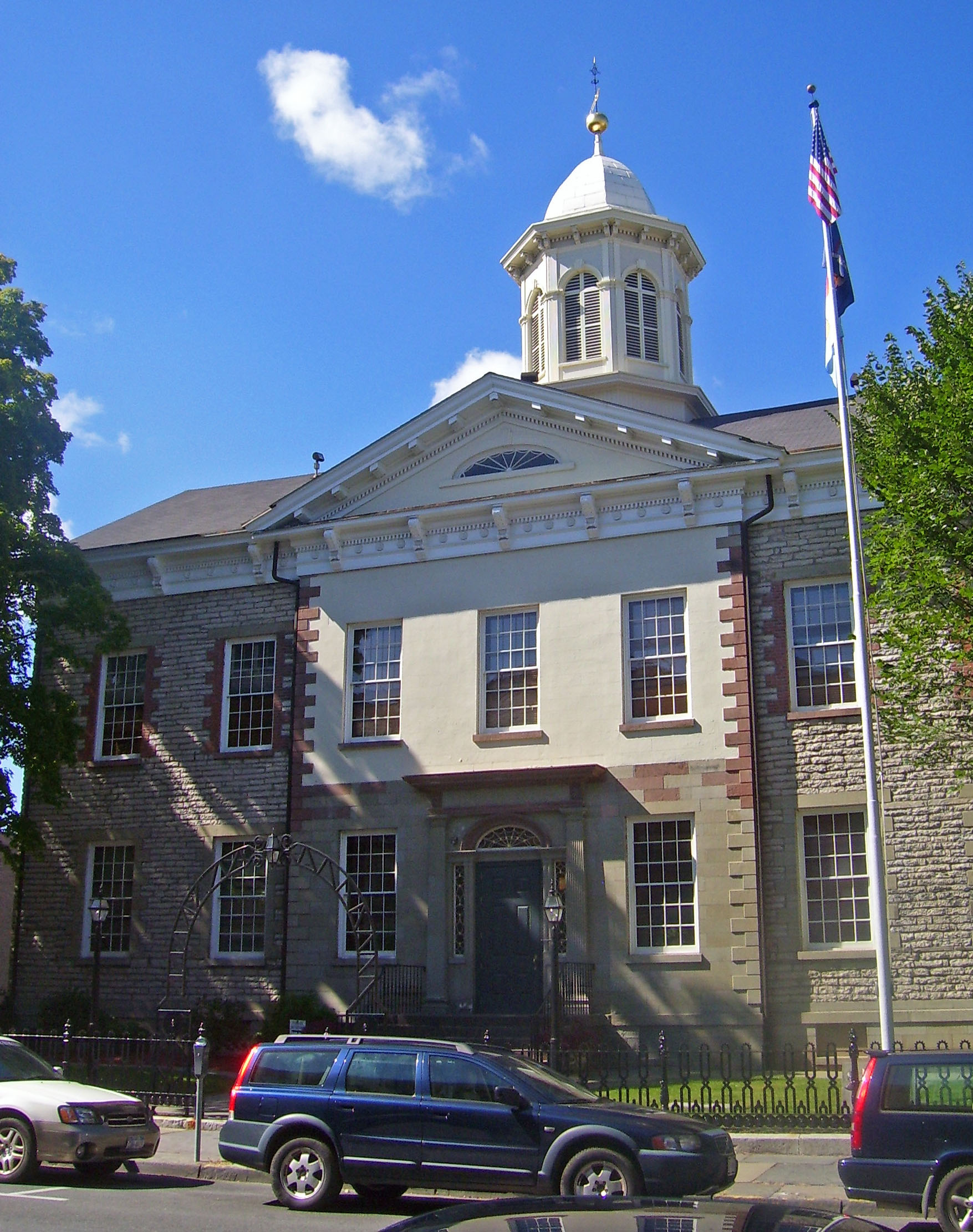
Ulster County courthouse

== Significant contributing properties ==
Some of the Stockade's buildings have earned a place on the National Register in their own right. One, the Old Dutch Church, was designated Kingston's first National Historic Landmark in 2008. Other contributing properties are not separately listed at present but are important to the district.

=== National Historic Landmark ===
- Old Dutch Church, 272 Wall Street. Formally known as the First Reformed Protestant Dutch Church of Kingston, founded in 1659, the 225-foot (69 m) white spire of this Minard Lafever-designed church dominates the uptown skyline. Built in 1852, it is Lafever's only surviving Renaissance Revival church, and his only stone church. George Clinton is buried in the yard.

=== National Register of Historic Places ===
- Kirkland Hotel, 2 Main Street. One of the district's newest contributing properties, this 1899 Tudorbethan hotel is a rare example of a wood-frame urban hotel. After almost three decades of vacancy, it was recently restored for mixed commercial and residential use by a local nonprofit group.
- Senate House, 276 Fair Street. A century after this stone house was built in 1676, the state of New York was founded in it. Later that year it was burned by the British Army. It is now a state historic site.

=== Other contributing properties ===
- Clermont Building, 295–299 Wall Street. This late 19th century commercial building retains the metal cresting on its slate mansard roof, a decorative feature often removed from many buildings of its era. The second floor has high ceilings with two murals of David and Goliath by an unknown artist.
- Houses at 21 and 25 Main Street. A pair of similar houses, with one dated to 1883, in the Eastlake variant of the Queen Anne style.
- House at 124 Green Street. Local watchmaker and inventor Charles Paige Carter built this board-and-batten cottage, the only Carpenter Gothic-style house in the district.
- Kingston Trust Company Building, 27 Main Street. This monumentally scaled Greek Revival commercial building has unusual windows, surrounded by carved wreaths, set into its frieze.
- Frantz Roggon House, 42 Crown Street. One of the four pre-Revolutionary stone houses at the Crown-John intersection, this was adapted for 19th-century purposes, with a diamond-paned glass door added to an early entranceway.
- St. Joseph's Church, 242 Wall Street. Built in 1833, this Greek Revival church was home to the Old Dutch Church congregation prior to the construction of its current church. It was later used as an armory during the Civil War, and afterwards became the city's first Roman Catholic church in 1868.
- Tappen House, 106–122 Green Street. Built ca. 1670, this is widely believed to be the oldest extant house in Kingston. Like the Roggon House, it was modified in the 19th century. It has a distinctive saltbox-style side elevation.
- Ulster County Courthouse, 285 Wall Street. One of the oldest extant county courthouses in the state, this Federal style stone structure was built in 1818 on the site of an earlier courthouse, parts of which remain in the foundation. The cupola was added in 1837.

== See also ==
- National Register of Historic Places listings in Ulster County, New York
