= Burning of Kingston =

1777 event in the American Revolutionary War

Depiction of the burning of Kingston in a British cartoon from 1778.

The Burning of Kingston, New York, took place on October 16, 1777, a Thursday, during the American Revolutionary War as part of the Saratoga Campaign.

== Description ==
In an attempt to relieve pressure on General John Burgoyne's forces in Saratoga, New York, British units under the command of Henry Clinton attacked and captured Fort Montgomery and Fort Clinton in the Hudson Highlands. Following this battle, Clinton sent forces under the command of General John Vaughan to raid the Hudson Valley. Vaughan attacked and burned Kingston, New York, then the capital of New York State, destroying more than 300 buildings.

The state government fled to Hurley, New York. Records of Ulster County, the county in which Kingston was located, were moved to a safe stone house in Kerhonkson to the southwest when it became evident that the British were going to burn or lay siege to the city.

== In popular culture ==
The burning of Kingston is central to the plot of the 1883 novel Rachel Du Mont by Mary Westbrook Van Deusen.

In the 2026 film Drummer Boy, Kingston is instead burned by American forces when a British regiment led by Lord Balfour decides to restock there.
