= Daily Freeman =

Daily morning newspaper in Kingston, New York

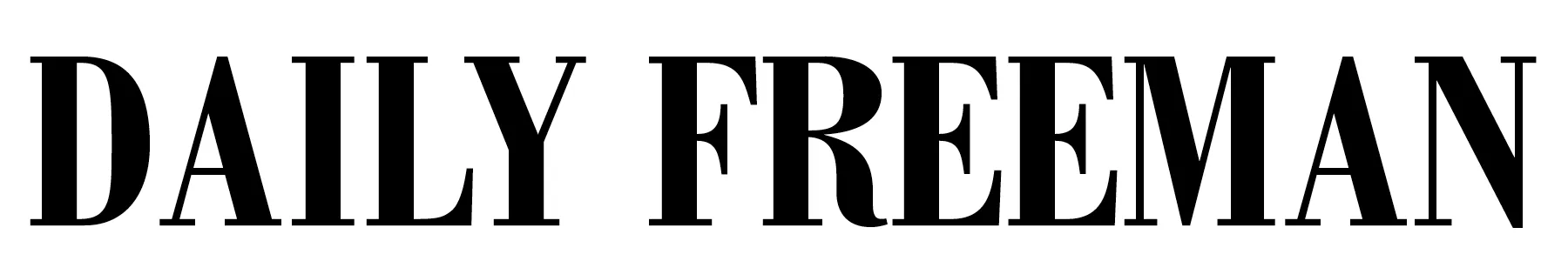
- Type: Daily newspaper
- Format: Broadsheet
- Owner: 21st Century Media
- Publisher: Kevin Corrado
- Founded: 1871
- Language: English
- Headquarters: Kingston, New York
- Circulation: 18,835 (as of 2024)
- Website: dailyfreeman.com

The Daily Freeman, published in Kingston, New York, serves as the primary morning newspaper for Ulster County, as well as Greene County, Columbia County and Dutchess County. Established in 1871 under the moniker "Rondout Daily Freeman," the publication initially resided in Downtown Kingston within the Rondout–West Strand Historic District. However, in November 1974, it shifted its headquarters to the enduring locale of Hurley Avenue in Uptown Kingston.

Notably, in 2021, under the stewardship of new owners, the MediaNews Group, the newspaper's administrative offices transitioned to 115 Green Street

Operating as a unionized entity, The Freeman employees are represented by the Kingston Newspaper Guild. Presently, the newspaper falls under the ownership of 21st-Century Media, a subsidiary of MediaNews Group (formerly known as Digital First Media). Noteworthy is the ownership chain's association with Alden Global Capital, a prominent hedge fund known for its strategic acquisitions within the newspaper industry. Alden Global Capital's approach often involves rigorous cost-cutting measures, significant layoffs, and strategic real estate sales following the acquisition of target newspapers .

== Archives ==
Archives of the newspaper can be found in different online collections including:

1. Hudson River Valley Historical Newspapers (HRVHN) has some 3037 issues from as early as 1892 through to 1959.
2. The Internet Archive has some 17, 304 issues in its "Newspapers Archive" collection.
3. The subscription website, newspapers.com has some 325,082 pages, and issues from 1873 to 1977.
