= Kingston, New York =

City in New York, United States

Kingston
- City
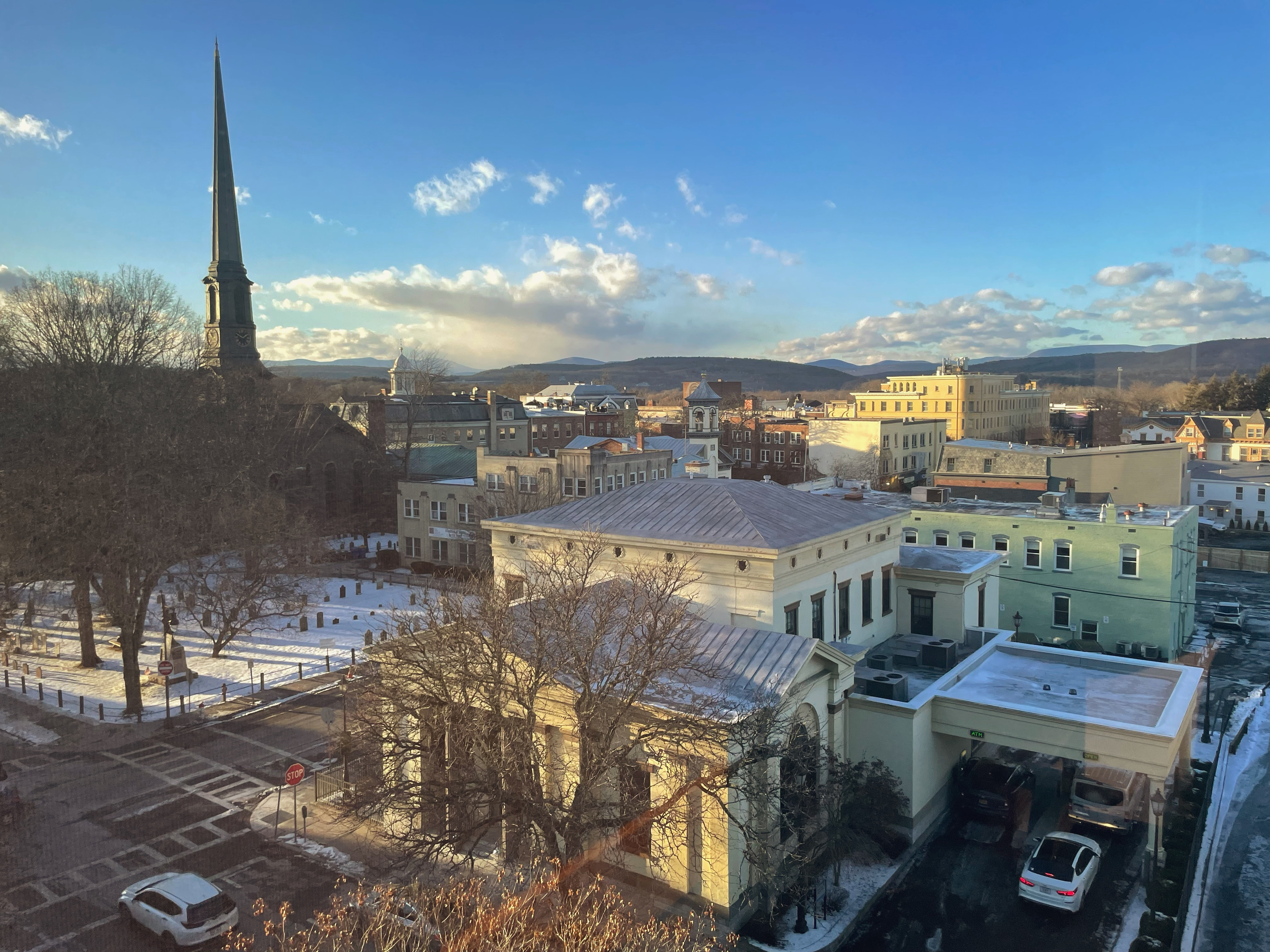
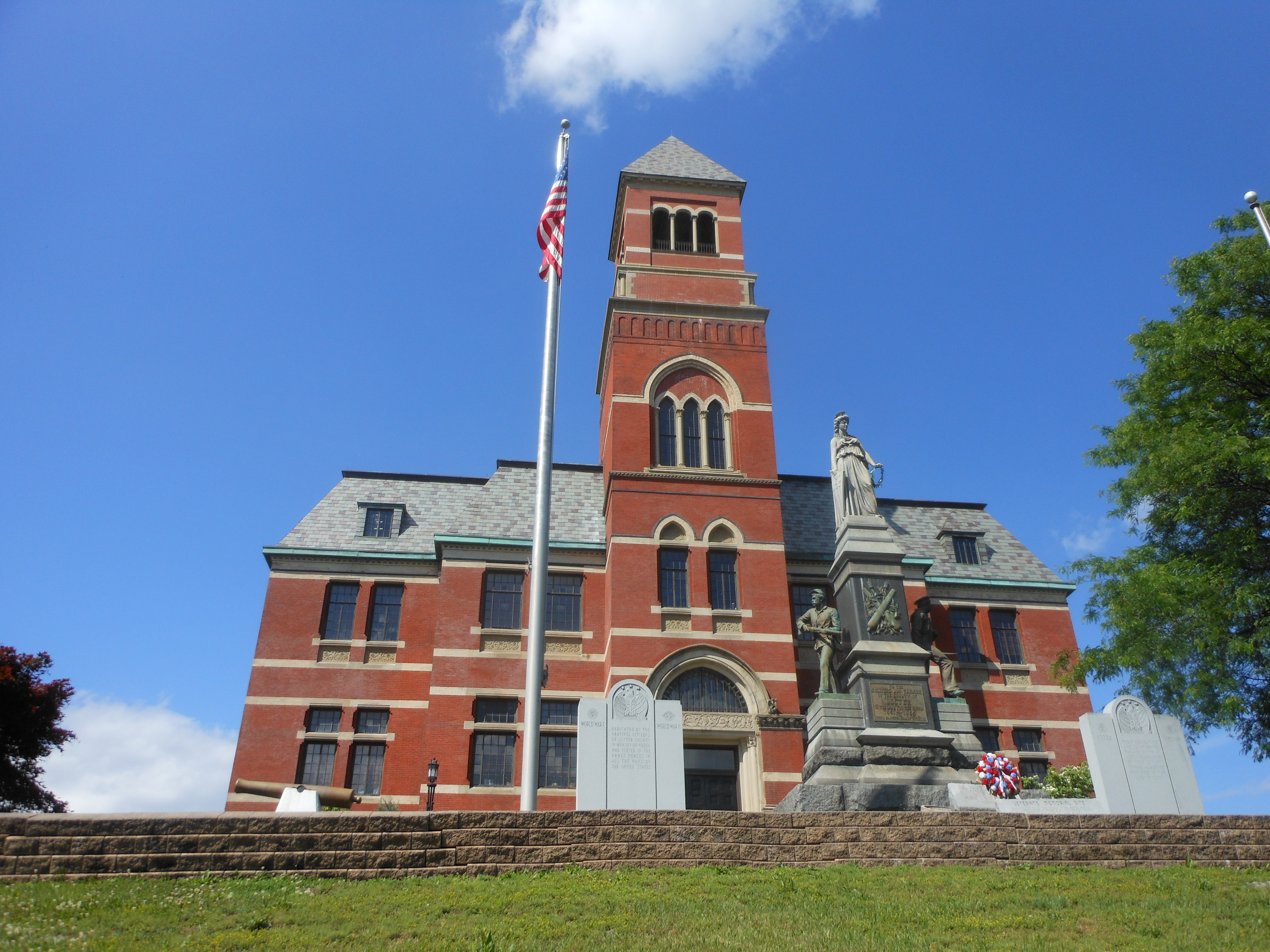
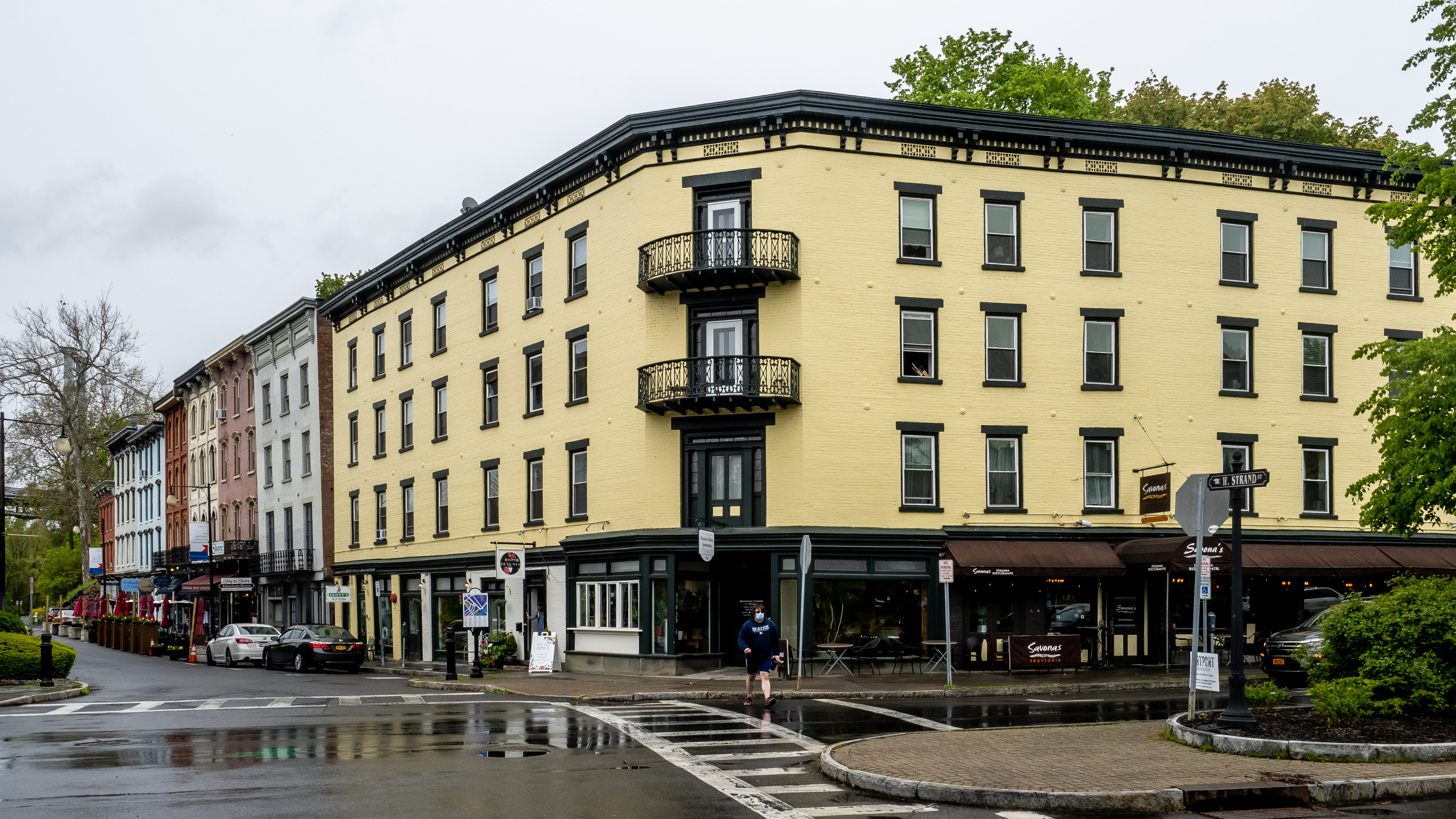
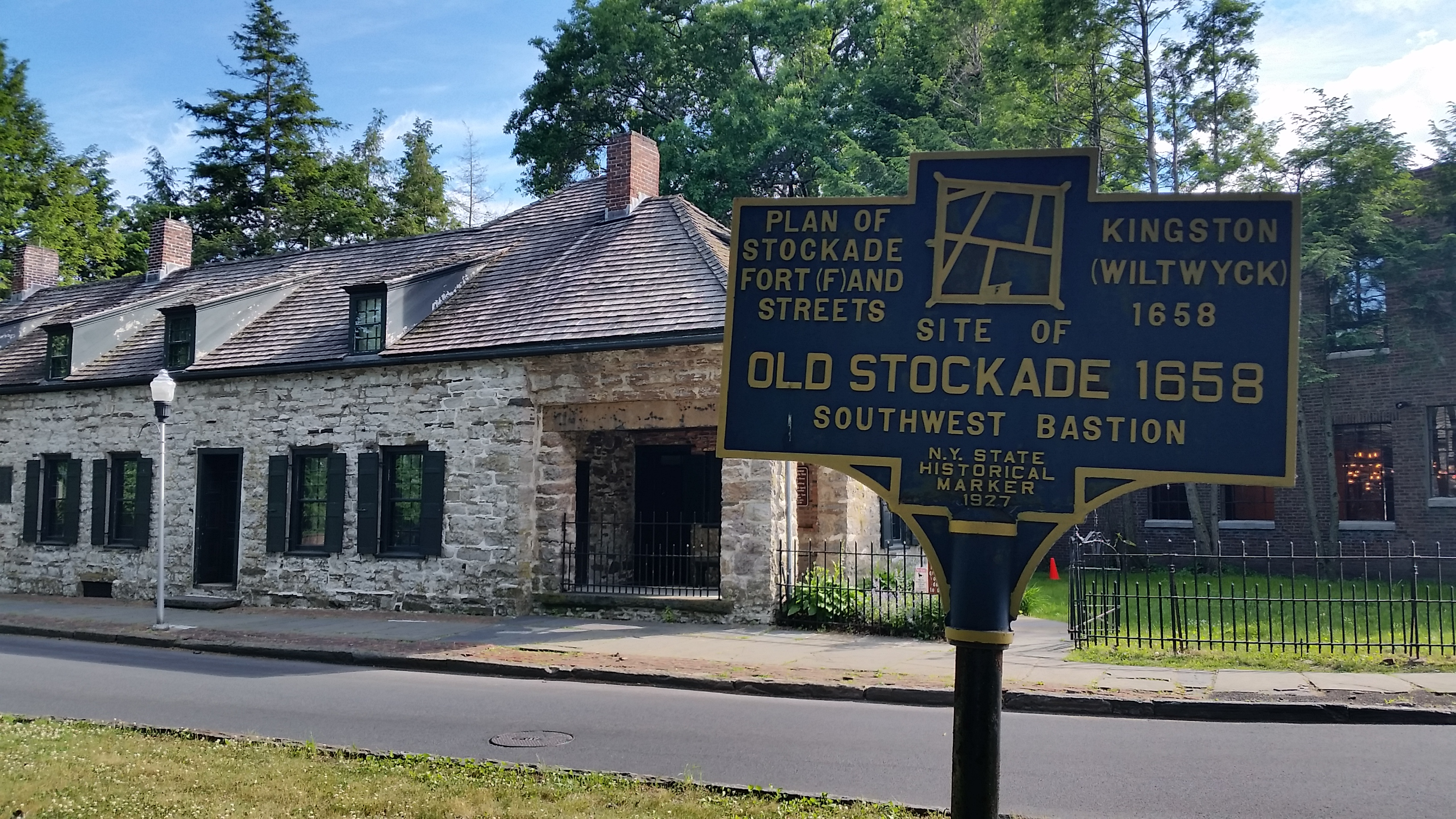
- Stockade District with the Old Dutch Church visible in the background City Hall The Rondout Senate House State Historic Site

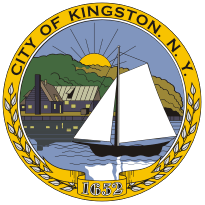
- Flag Seal

- Location in Ulster County, New York

- Location within New York Location within the United States
- Coordinates: 41°55′43″N 74°00′07″W
- Country: United States
- State: New York
- County: Ulster
- Settled: 1652; 374 years ago
- Village: April 6, 1805; 221 years ago
- City: May 29, 1872; 154 years ago

Government
  - Mayor: Steve Noble (D)
  - Common Council: Members' List: At-Large Member: • Andrea Shaut (D); • W1: Sara Pasti (D); • W2: Michael Tierney (D); • W3: Marissa Marvelli (D); • W4: Ben Falk (D); • W5: Teryl Mickens (D); • W6: Robert Dennison (D); • W7: Mike Ham (D); • W8: Ruth Katz (D); • W9: Michele Hirsch (D, Majority Leader)

Area
  - City: 8.77 sq mi (22.71 km^{2})
  - Land: 7.48 sq mi (19.38 km^{2})
  - Water: 1.29 sq mi (3.33 km^{2})
- Elevation: 190 ft (58 m)

Population (2020)
  - City: 24,069
  - Density: 3,220/sq mi (1,242/km^{2})
  - Metro: 181,851
- Time zone: UTC−5 (Eastern (EST))
  - Summer (DST): UTC−4 (EDT)
- ZIP Codes: 12401–12402
- Area code: 845
- FIPS code: 36-39727
- GNIS feature ID: 0979119
- Website: kingston-ny.gov

Kingston is a city in and the county seat of Ulster County, New York, United States. The population was 24,069 at the 2020 census, while the Kingston metropolitan statistical area had 177,749 residents. It is at the confluence of Rondout Creek and the Hudson River, 91 miles (146 km) north of New York City and 59 miles (95 km) south of Albany. The city's metropolitan area is grouped with the New York metropolitan area around Manhattan by the United States Census Bureau.

Kingston became New York's first capital in 1777. During the American Revolutionary War, the city was burned by the British on October 16, 1777, after the Battles of Saratoga. Albany was designated the state capital in 1797, years after the colonies achieved independence.

In the 19th century, Kingston became an important transport hub after the discovery of natural cement in 1825 in the region. The city's connections to other markets through both the railroad and Erie Canal made it strong economically. Today many of the older buildings associated with this era are considered contributing as part of three historic districts, including the Stockade District uptown, the Midtown Neighborhood Broadway Corridor, and the Rondout-West Strand Historic District downtown. Each district is listed on the National Register of Historic Places.

== History ==
Historical Affiliations

Dutch Republic Empire 1614–1674
British Empire 1674–1776
United States 1776–present

Pictorial map, 1875

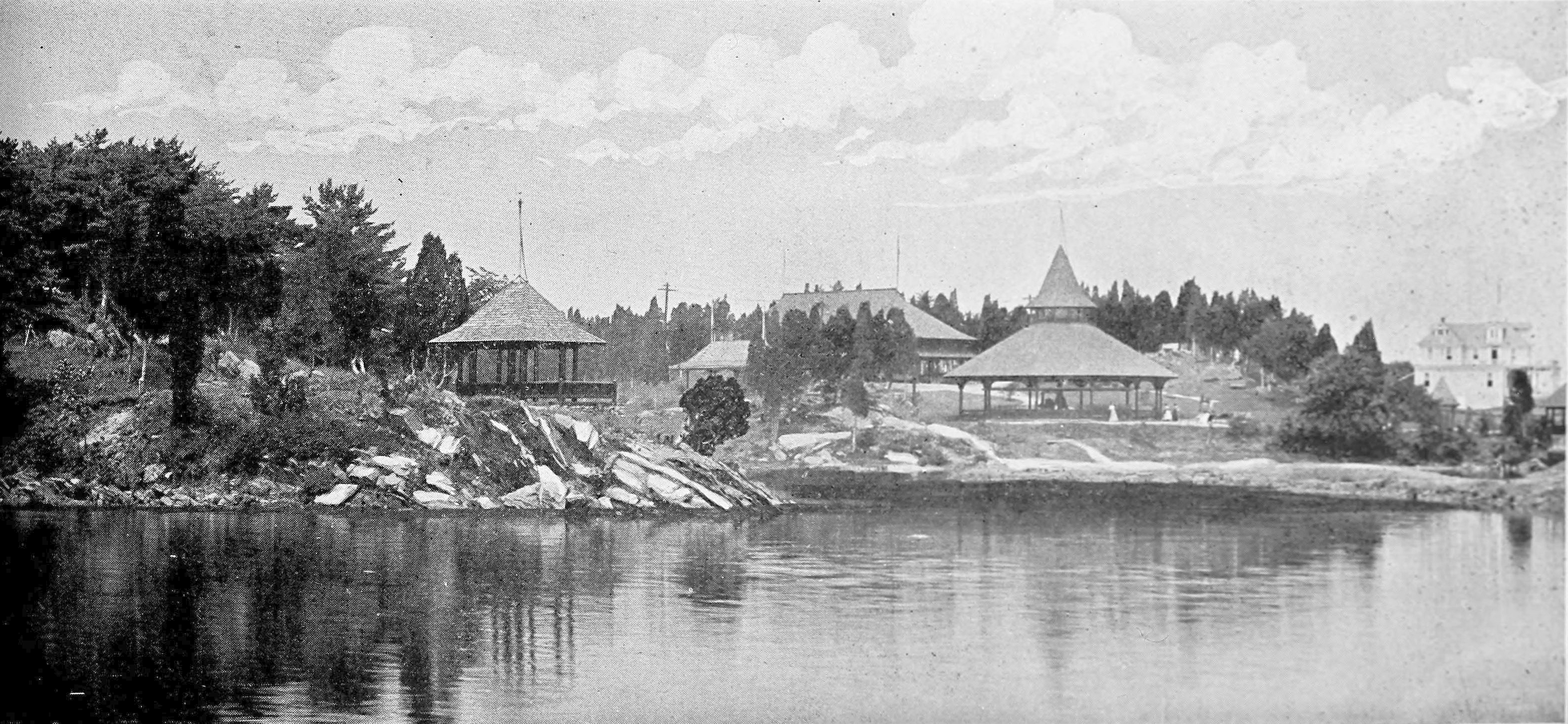
Kingston Point, 1899

=== Colonial history ===
Kingston is the traditional home of the Esopus people. As early as 1614, the Dutch had set up a factorij (trading post) at Ponckhockie, at the junction of the Rondout Creek and the Hudson River. They traded European goods with the Lenape and Mohican for the furs their trappers collected. In 1652, the Indians of Ulster County ceded some land to the Dutch in what is now known as Kingston. The first recorded permanent settler in what would become the city of Kingston was Thomas Chambers. He came from the area of Rensselaerswyck in 1653. The new settlement was called Esopus after the local Lenape people.

In 1654, European settlers began buying more land from the Esopus Indians further west. However, historians believe the two cultures had drastically different conceptions of property and land use, causing tension between the two groups. Common sources of friction between Dutch settlers and the Esopus included settlers' livestock trampling Indian cornfields, disputes over trade, and the adverse effects of Dutch brandy on the Native Americans. Prior to the Europeans' arrival, natives had no experience with liquor.

In the spring of 1658, Peter Stuyvesant, Director-General of New Amsterdam, ordered the consolidation and fortification of the settlement on high ground in what today is Uptown Kingston. The building of the defensive stockade increased the conflicts. Tensions broke out in the Esopus Wars.

In 1661, the Dutch granted a charter for the settlement as a separate municipality; Stuyvesant named it Wiltwijck (Wiltwyck). In 1663, the Esopus were defeated in the Second Esopus War by a coalition of Dutch settlers, and Wappinger and Mohawk peoples.

When the Dutch ceded their New Netherland to the British in September 1664, the British Royal Commission of 1664 worked to settle boundaries and conflict between the Europeans and the Esopus. Ultimately, the Richard Nicolls/Esopus Indian Treaty (1665) resulted in lasting peace between the natives and settlers. According to the treaty, the Esopus "in the names of themselves and theire heirs forever, give, Grant, Alienate, and Confirme all their Right and Interest, Claime or demand, to a certaine Parcell of Land" including the city of Kingston and extending to modern Kerhonkson. In exchange, the natives received "forty Blanketts, Twenty Pounds of Powder, Twenty Knives, Six Kettles, [and] Twelve Barrs of Lead" and "three laced redd coates" as a gift to the tribal leaders. Further, the British and Esopus designed a system of trade which included a protected trade path for the Esopus to travel unharmed, and a safe house where Esopus could stay when visiting the village. The treaty was respected for generations, as evidenced by records of annual gatherings between the Esopus and local Kingstonians where each exchanged gifts of mutual respect. The treaty is still recognized and celebrated by the City of Kingston and descendants of the Esopus.

Many descendants of the Esopus people who inhabited the area became remnant members of several other related, displaced tribes. Some in the diaspora are among the federally recognized Stockbridge–Munsee Community, who moved from New York to Shawano County, Wisconsin; the Munsee-Delaware of the Six Nations Reserve in Ontario, Canada, established after the Revolution by the Crown for its Iroquois and other Indian allies; and the Ramapough Lenape Indian Nation (located primarily in the highland of the New York-New Jersey border area).

Wiltwyck was one of three large Hudson River settlements in New Netherland, the other two being Beverwyck, now Albany; and New Amsterdam, now New York City. With the English seizure of New Netherland in 1664, relations between the Dutch settlers and the English soldiers garrisoned there were often strained. In 1669, the English renamed Wiltwyck Kingston, in honor of the family seat of Governor Lovelace's mother. In 1683, citizens of Kingston petitioned the Kingston court to buy more land from the Esopus people. Officials from Ulster County maintained contact with the Esopus until 1727.

In 1777, Kingston was designated as the first capital of the state of New York. During the spring of 1777, when the New York State constitution was being written in White Plains, New York City was occupied by British troops. The work was moved to Kingston, which was deemed safer, and the document completed that April 20. It was never submitted to the people for ratification, but the first governor of the state, George Clinton, was sworn in as the first Governor of New York on July 30, 1777.

The British never reached Albany, having been stopped at Saratoga, but they did reach Kingston. On October 16, 1777, the city was burned by British troops moving up river from New York City and disembarking at the mouth of the Rondout Creek at "Ponckhockie". (One contemporary letter implies the event occurred earlier, but this is widely considered a reporting error.) The residents of Kingston knew about the oncoming fleet. By the time the British arrived, the residents and government officials had removed to Hurley. The Kingston area was largely agricultural and a major granary for the colonies at the time, so the British burned large amounts of wheat and all but one or two of the buildings. Kingston celebrates and re-enacts the 1777 burning of the city by the British every other year in a citywide theatrical staging of the event that begins at the Rondout.

Kingston was incorporated as a village on April 6, 1805. In the early 1800s, four sloops plied the river, carrying passengers and freight from Kingston to New York. By 1829, river steamers made the trip to Manhattan in a little over twelve hours, usually travelling by night. Columbus Point (now known as Kingston Point) was the river landing for Kingston, and stage lines ran from the village to the Point. The Dutch cultural influence in Kingston remained strong through the nineteenth century.

=== Rondout ===
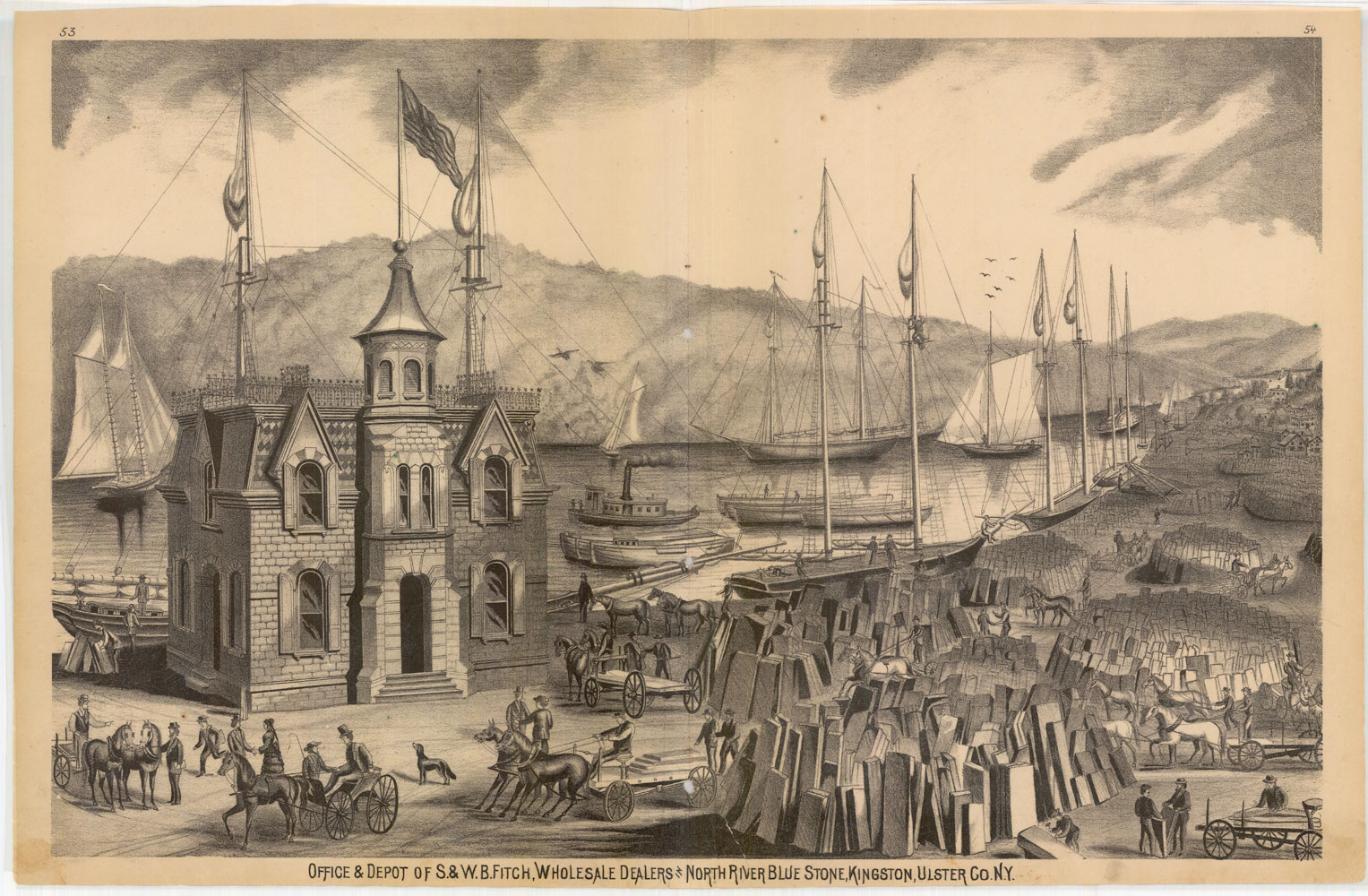
A 19th-century bluestone shipping depot on Rondout Creek

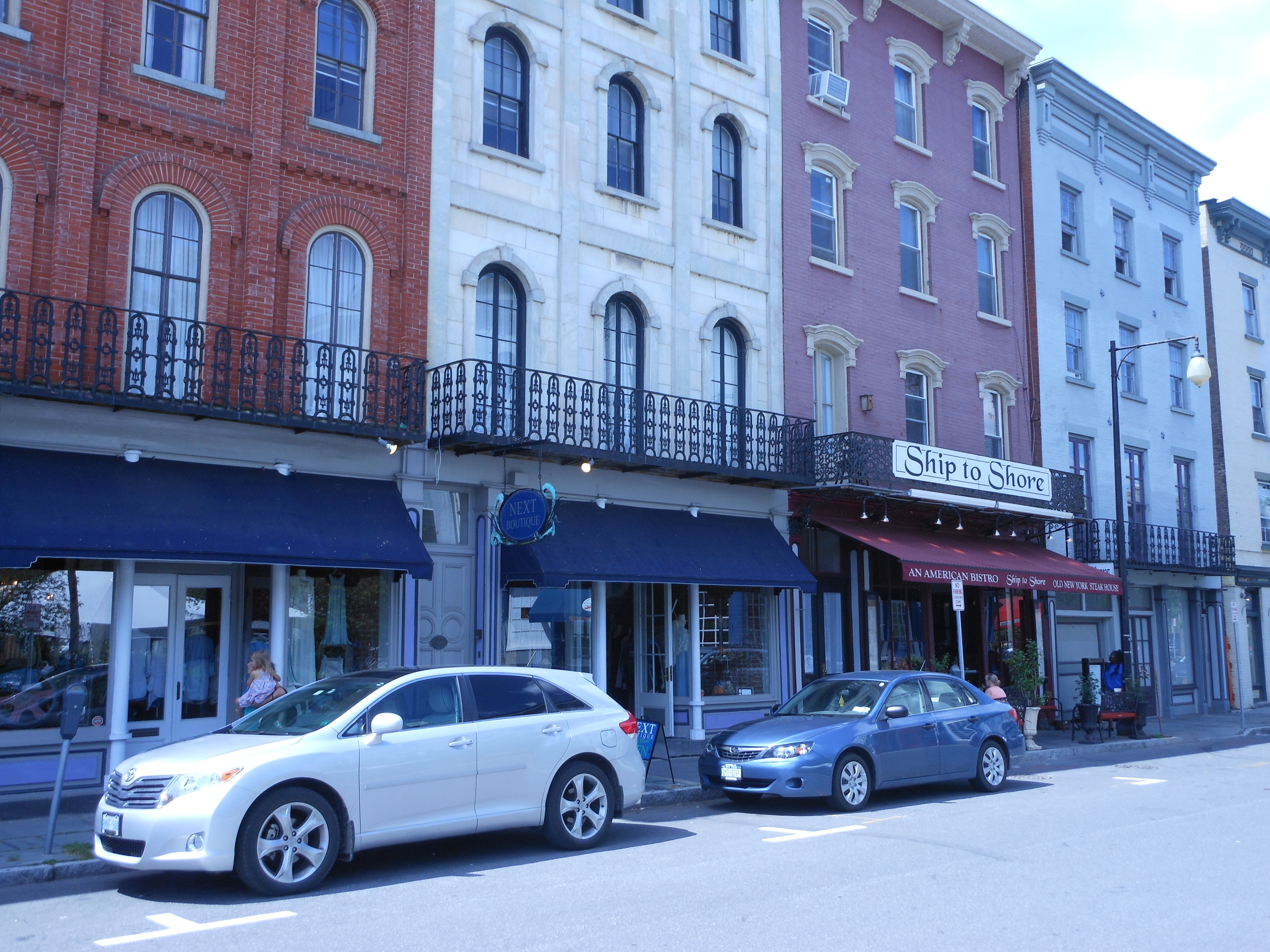
Historic commercial buildings in Kingston

Rondout was a small farming village until 1825, when construction of the Delaware and Hudson Canal from Rondout to Honesdale, Pennsylvania, attracted an influx of laborers. When they completed the canal in 1828, Rondout became an important tidewater coal terminal. Natural cement deposits were found throughout the valley, and in 1844 quarrying began in the "Ponchockie" section of Rondout. The Newark Lime and Cement Company shipped cement throughout the United States, a thriving business until the invention of cheaper, quicker drying Portland Cement. Workers cut and stored ice from the Hudson River each winter, keeping it in large warehouses of ice near the river. The ice would be cut in chunks and delivered to customers around the city. It was preserved in straw all year and ice chunks served as an early method of refrigeration.

Large brick making factories also were built near this shipping hub. Rondout's primacy as a shipping hub ended with the advent of railroads. These lines were built through Rondout and Kingston, with stations in each place. They could also transport their loads through the city without stopping.

=== Wilbur ===
Wilbur (aka Twaalfskill) was a hamlet upstream from Rondout, where the Twaalfskill Creek met the Rondout Creek. There was a sloop landing there. The hamlet became the center for the shipment of bluestone to lay the sidewalks of New York City.

Kingston officially became a city on May 29, 1872, with the merger of the villages of Rondout and Kingston, and the hamlet of Wilbur.

== Geography ==
Kingston has three recognized area neighborhoods. The Uptown Stockade Area, The Midtown Area, and The Downtown Waterfront Area. The Uptown Stockade District was the first capital of New York State. Meanwhile, the Midtown area is known for its early 20th century industries and is home to the Ulster Performing Arts Center and the historic City Hall building.

The downtown area, once the village of Rondout and now the Rondout-West Strand Historic District, borders the Rondout Creek and includes a recently redeveloped waterfront. The creek empties into the Hudson River through a large, protected tidal area which was the terminus of the Delaware and Hudson Canal, built to haul coal from Pennsylvania to New York City.

The Rondout neighborhood is known for its artists' community and its many art galleries. It is also the site of a number of festivals, including the Kingston Jazz Festival and the Artists Soapbox Derby.

Midtown is the largest of Kingston's neighborhoods, home to Kingston High School, an original Carnegie Library that is currently part of the high school, and both campuses of HealthAlliance Hospital, part of the Westchester Medical Center Health Network; HealthAlliance Broadway Campus (formerly The Kingston Hospital) and HealthAlliance Mary's Avenue Campus (formerly Benedictine Hospital).

While the Uptown area is noted for its "antique" feeling, the overhangs attached to buildings along Wall and North Front streets were added to historic buildings in the late 1970s and are not authentically part of the 19th century Victorian architecture. The historic covered storefront walks, known as the Pike Plan, were recently reinforced and modernized with skylights. In the Stockade district of Uptown, many 17th century stone buildings remain. Among these is the Senate House, which was built in the 1670s and was used as the state capitol during the revolution. Many of these old buildings were burned by the British Oct. 17, 1777, and restored later. A controversial restoration of 1970s-era canopies was marred by the sudden appearance of painted red goats on planters just prior to the neighborhood's rededication. This part of the city is also the location of the Ulster County Office Building.

According to the United States Census Bureau, the city has an area of 8.6 square miles (22 km^{2}), of which 7.3 square miles (19 km^{2}) is land and 1.3 square miles (3.4 km^{2}), or 15.03%, is water. The city is on the west bank of the Hudson River. Neighboring towns include Hurley, Saugerties, Rhinebeck, and Red Hook.

== Demographics ==
Historical population
| Census | Pop. | Note | %± |
|---|---|---|---|
| 1870 | 6,315 | | — |
| 1880 | 18,344 | | 190.5% |
| 1890 | 21,261 | | 15.9% |
| 1900 | 24,535 | | 15.4% |
| 1910 | 25,908 | | 5.6% |
| 1920 | 26,688 | | 3.0% |
| 1930 | 28,088 | | 5.2% |
| 1940 | 28,589 | | 1.8% |
| 1950 | 28,817 | | 0.8% |
| 1960 | 29,260 | | 1.5% |
| 1970 | 25,544 | | −12.7% |
| 1980 | 24,481 | | −4.2% |
| 1990 | 23,095 | | −5.7% |
| 2000 | 23,456 | | 1.6% |
| 2010 | 23,893 | | 1.9% |
| 2020 | 24,069 | | 0.7% |
U.S. Decennial Census

=== 2020 census ===
As of the 2020 census, Kingston had a population of 24,069. The median age was 40.1 years. 20.2% of residents were under the age of 18 and 18.1% of residents were 65 years of age or older. For every 100 females there were 94.0 males, and for every 100 females age 18 and over there were 91.8 males age 18 and over.

99.9% of residents lived in urban areas, while 0.1% lived in rural areas.

There were 10,407 households in Kingston, of which 25.0% had children under the age of 18 living in them. Of all households, 30.2% were married-couple households, 24.0% were households with a male householder and no spouse or partner present, and 35.2% were households with a female householder and no spouse or partner present. About 38.8% of all households were made up of individuals and 15.0% had someone living alone who was 65 years of age or older.

There were 11,571 housing units, of which 10.1% were vacant. The homeowner vacancy rate was 1.7% and the rental vacancy rate was 6.0%.

Racial composition as of the 2020 census
| Race | Number | Percent |
|---|---|---|
| White | 15,348 | 63.8% |
| Black or African American | 3,144 | 13.1% |
| American Indian and Alaska Native | 268 | 1.1% |
| Asian | 636 | 2.6% |
| Native Hawaiian and Other Pacific Islander | 3 | 0.0% |
| Some other race | 1,819 | 7.6% |
| Two or more races | 2,851 | 11.8% |
| Hispanic or Latino (of any race) | 4,107 | 17.1% |

=== 2010 census ===
As of the 2010 census, the city had 23,887 people, 9,844 households, and 5,498 families. The population density was 3,189.5 persons per square mile (1,231.5 persons/km^{2}). There were 10,637 housing units at an average density of 1,446.4 houses per square mile (558.5 houses/km^{2}). The city's racial makeup was 73.2% White, 14.6% Black or African American, 0.50% Native American, 1.80% Asian, 1.90% from other races, and 5.00% from two or more races. Hispanic or Latino of any race were 13.4% of the population.

=== 2000 census ===
As of the 2000 census there were 9,871 households, out of which 27.0% had children under the age of 18 living with them, 35.2% were married couples living together, 15.8% had a female householder with no husband present, and 44.3% were non-families. 36.8% of all households were made up of individuals, and 14.8% had someone living alone who was 65 years of age or older. The average household size was 2.28 and the average family size was 3.02.

In the city, the population was spread out, with 23.9% under the age of 18, 8.1% from 18 to 24, 28.9% from 25 to 44, 21.9% from 45 to 64, and 17.1% who were 65 years of age or older. The median age was 38 years. For every 100 females, there were 89.1 males. For every 100 females age 18 and over, there were 84.1 males.

The city's median household income was $31,594, and the median family income was $41,806. Males had a median income of $31,634 versus $25,364 for females. The city's per capita income was $18,662, with 12.4% of families and 15.8% of the population below the poverty line, including 23.5% of those under age 18 and 10.3% of those age 65 or over.

== Arts and culture ==
O+ Festival is a music and arts festival in Kingston.

== Sports ==
Kingston Stockade FC is a men's semi-professional soccer club that competes in the National Premier Soccer League in the fourth division of the US soccer pyramid. Kingston Stockade FC play their home games at Dietz Stadium.

In 1921, one time major league player Dutch Schirick organized a semi-professional team, the Colonels, in Kingston, New York. Major league teams would, on occasion, play exhibition games against the Kingston Colonels, and would sometimes recruit local talent. Bud Culloton became a pitcher for the Pittsburgh Pirates.

In the 1880s a semipro baseball team, the Kingston Leaders, played at Donovan Field. The team was sponsored by a local newspaper, the Kingston Daily Leader.

== Parks and recreation ==
The city's Hasbrouck Park was created in 1920; it is 45 acres (18 ha) in area and includes a nature trail.

== Government ==
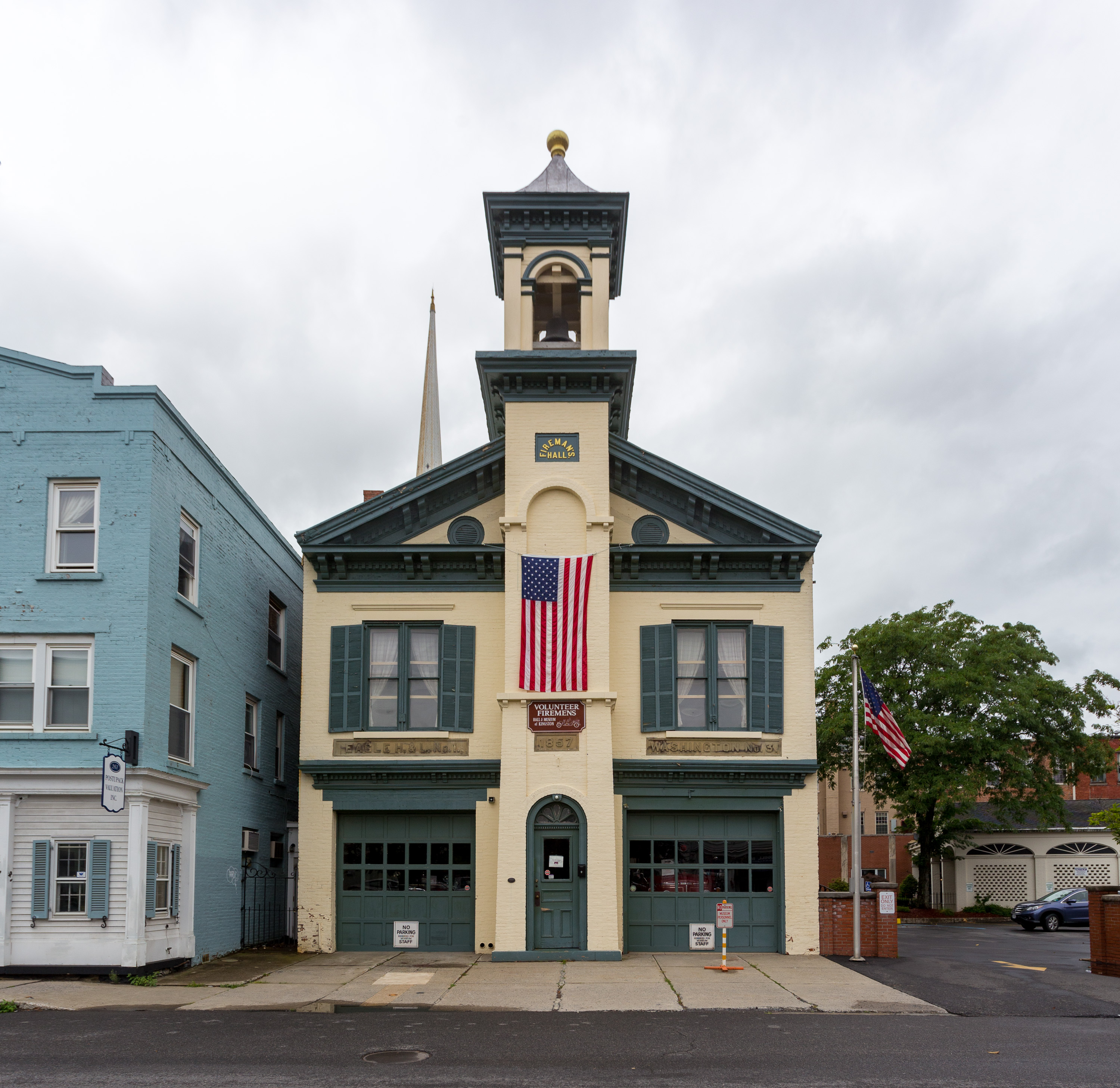
Volunteer Firemen's Hall and Museum

The government of Kingston consists of a mayor and city council known as the Common Council. The Common Council consists of 10 members, nine of which are elected from wards while one is elected at large. The mayor is elected in a citywide vote every four years.

Steve Noble was elected to the mayoral post in 2015.

List of notable mayors:

| Name | Years served | Notes |
|---|---|---|
| James Girard Lindsley | 1872-1877 | Lindsley Street named for him |
| William Lounsbery | 1878-1879 | Lounsbery Place named for him |
| Raymond W. Garraghan | | Garraghan Drive named for him |
| Frank Koenig | -1979 | Frank Koenig Boulevard named for him |

== Education ==
- The Kingston City School District, which covers the entire city, contains seven elementary schools, two middle schools, and one high school.
- Kingston High School is the district's public high school

The Roman Catholic Archdiocese of New York operates Catholic schools in Ulster County. John A. Coleman Catholic High School closed in 2019. Kingston Catholic School is also in the community.

St. Joseph School in Kingston had 267 students in 2007. It was originally scheduled to close in 2013. However the archdiocese reversed course and allowed it to stay open. However, in 2017 the school ultimately did close. By spring 2017 the school had 146 students. The would-be enrollment had dropped to 90 for the 2017–2018 school year. Kingston Catholic School acquired the newer St. Joseph building and turned it into its middle school facility. The older building was put up for sale in 2019.

The Kingston Center of SUNY Ulster (KCSU) is a branch of the county's community college that offers programs, courses and certifications at a convenient Midtown location. KCSU is the new home for Police Basic Training and also offers human services, criminal justice and the general education courses required by the State of New York to satisfy the liberal arts core of an A.A. or A.S. degree.

== Media ==
=== Newspapers ===
- Daily Freeman, Kingston Times
- See also: List of newspapers in New York in the 18th-century#Kingston

=== Television ===
- Public-access television channel 23
- News 12

=== Radio ===
- Kingston-based: WAMK (90.9 FM), WGHQ (920 AM), WKNY (1490 AM/107.9 FM), WKXP (94.3 FM)

=== Print ===
- Chronogram, Trends Journal

== Infrastructure ==
=== Transportation ===
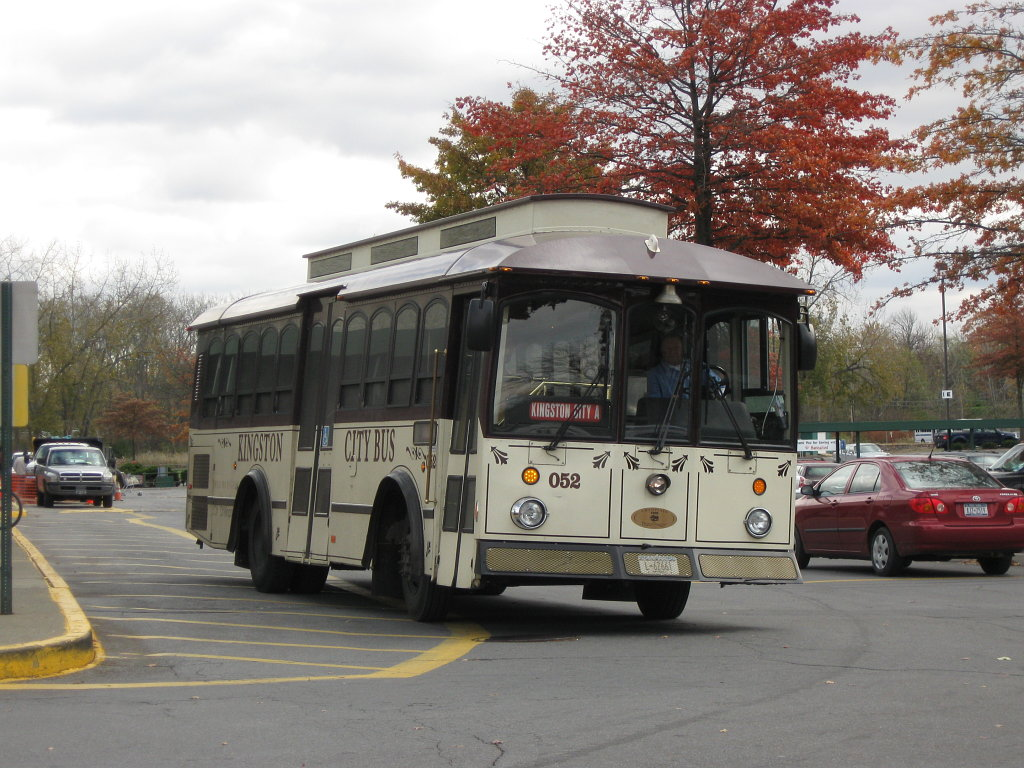
Kingston CitiBus provides service within the city and to Port Ewen.

Commuter service is available by bus to New York City daily via Trailways of New York. The 90-mile trip takes roughly two hours by motor coach.

Passenger railroad service to Kingston Union Station was discontinued in 1958 when the New York Central Railroad ended passenger service on the West Shore Railroad, which ran on an Albany—Kingston—Newburgh—Weehawken, New Jersey itinerary. Amtrak maintains service on the east side of the Hudson. The Rhinecliff–Kingston Amtrak station is about 11 miles (20 km) away, and there is also access to Amtrak at the Poughkeepsie station, on the east bank of the Hudson and about 17 miles (30 km) south. That station also serves as the northernmost terminus for Metro-North commuter trains.

CSX Transportation operates freight rail service through Kingston on the River Line Subdivision. A small rail yard containing seven tracks is operated in Kingston.

The Kingston-Rhinecliff Bridge, 4.32 miles (6.95 km) to the north, carries New York State Route 199 and is the nearest bridge traversing the Hudson River. U.S. Highway 9W runs north–south through the city. The New York State Thruway, carrying the Interstate 87 designation through this section, runs through the western part of the city.

The area is served by Kingston–Ulster Airport, located at the western base of the Kingston–Rhinecliff bridge. The nearest major airports to Kingston are Stewart International Airport 39 miles (62.8 km) south in Newburgh, and Albany International Airport, approximately 65 mi (105 km) north. The three major metropolitan airports for New York City are located on western Long Island (LaGuardia Airport, approximately 80 mi (129 km) south and John F. Kennedy International, approximately 93 mi (150 km) south) and in New Jersey (Newark Liberty International, approximately 86 mi (138 km) south).

Local travel was supported by the city-owned CitiBus system (headquarters at 420 Broadway) provides city bus service, and Ulster County Area Transit (UCAT) provides service to points elsewhere in Ulster County. Route A travels between Kingston Plaza and Riverfront, B between Albany Avenue and Fairview Avenue, and C between Golden Hill and Port Ewen. The service was taken over by UCAT in 2019.

Kingston historically was an important transportation center for the region. The Hudson River, Rondout Creek and Delaware and Hudson Canal were important commercial waterways. At one time, Kingston was served by four railroad companies and two trolley lines. Kingston has been designated as a New York State Heritage Area, with a transportation theme. The Hudson River Maritime Museum and Trolley Museum of New York are located along the waterfront and help interpret this historic role.

The Catskill Mountain Railroad, a scenic railroad company, runs trains from Kingston to West Hurley on the former Ulster and Delaware right of way.

As of 2016, more than 12 projects were being coordinated among the Kingston Land Trust, Kingston City Government, and Ulster County Government, which will connect all three of Kingston's historic neighborhoods with a combination of rail trails, bike lanes and Complete Streets connections.

=== Healthcare ===
Residents of the city and surrounding areas are served by the two hospital campuses of HealthAlliance of the Hudson Valley, a 315-bed healthcare system:

- HealthAlliance Hospital: Broadway Campus (formerly Kingston Hospital)
- HealthAlliance Hospital: Mary's Avenue Campus (formerly Benedictine Hospital)

HealthAlliance is part of the Westchester Medical Center Health Network, a 10-hospital, 1,700-bed Hudson Valley-wide healthcare system.

== See also ==
- Reher Center for Immigrant Culture and History
