= List of New York State Historic Markers in Ulster County, New York =

This is an incomplete list of New York State Historic Markers in Ulster County, New York.

== Listings County-Wide ==
(147 Markers)

#	Marker heading	Image	Designator	Location	City or town	Coordinates	Marker text
1	CHURCH OF THE ASCENSION ESOPUS	Historic marker sign for the church	State Ed Dept, 1935	US 9W AT WEST PARK	Esopus	41°48′17.59″N 73°57′32.87″W	CHURCH OF THE; ASCENSION; ESOPUS; BUILT 1842
2	JOHN BURROUGHS	Historic marker sign to Slabsides	State Ed Dept, 1935	B'WAY & PARK LA., IN WEST PARK,	Esopus	41°47′56.9544″N 73°57′32.4612″W	JOHN BURROUGHS; 1 $\frac{1}{2}$ MILES WESTWARD IS "SLABSIDES", RUSTIC CABIN; OF THE POET-NATURALIST, WHERE HE SPENT MUCH TIME; IN THE LATE 90'S [sic] AND EARLY 1900'S [sic].
3	GENERAL WASHINGTON	Historic marker sign for where there was a party for George Washington	State Ed Dept, 1938	N.E. CORNER ZANDHOECK RD. & MILLBROOK AVE.	Hurley	41°55′27.75″N 74°03′40.1″W	GENERAL WASHINGTON WAS GIVEN A PUBLIC RECEPTION HERE ON HIS JOURNEY FROM WEST POINT TO KINGSTON, NOV. 16, 1782
4	OLD GUARD HOUSE	Historic marker sign for the Old Guard House	State Ed Dept, 1938	US 209	Hurley	41°55′33.42″N 74°03′49.86″W	LIEUT. DAVID TAYLOR, BRITISH SPY, WAS CONFINED IN THIS HOUSE AND HANGED ON AN APPLE TREE, OCTOBER 18, 1777
5	OLD MINE ROAD	Historic marker sign for the Esopus-Minisink Trail	State Ed Dept, 1949	US 209.	Hurley	41°55′30.94″N 74°03′46.77″W	ESOPUS-MINISINK TRAIL INDIAN TRAIL CONNECTING; DELAWARE VALLEY WITH HUDSON; RIVER. USED BEFORE AND; DURING REVOLUTION
6	VAN DEUSEN HOUSE	Historic marker sign for the van Dusen House	NY State Historical Marker (no date)	US 209.	Hurley	41°55′30.66″N 74°03′45.01″W	BUILT 1723 TEMPORARY CAPITOL OF STATE AFTER BURNING OF KINGSTON 1777.
7	ELMENDORF TAVERN			SE CORNER MAIDEN LA. & FAIR ST.	Kingston		MEETING PLACE STATE COMMITTEE OF SAFETY 1777
8	FIRST KINGSTON ACADEMY			SW CORNER JOHN & CROWN STS.	Kingston		FIRST KINGSTON ACADEMY FOUNDED 1774 BY TRUSTEES OF TOWN OF KINGSTON.
9	PLAN OF KINGSTON STOCKADE	Historic marker for the Kingston Stockade	NY State Historical Marker, 1927	N. FRONT ST. & CLINTON AVE.	Kingston	41°56′07.2″N 74°01′07″W	PLAN OF KINGSTON STOCKADE (WILTWYCK) FORT (F) AND 1658 STREETS SITE OF OLD STOCKADE 1658
10	SITE OF OLD BLOCKHOUSE	Historic marker for the location of the Old Blockhouse	NY State Historical Marker, 1927	S.W. CORNER MAIN & FAIR STS.	Kingston	41°55′57.7″N 74°01′05.3″W	SITE OF OLD BLOCKHOUSE BUILT 1658
11	SITE OF BOGARDUS TAVERN	Original Historic marker for the Bogardus Tavern	NY State Historical Marker, 1927	N.W. CORNER MAIDEN LA. & FAIR ST.	Kingston	41°55′52.09″N 74°01′01.17″W	SITE OF; BOGARDUS TAVERN; FIRST MEETING PLACE; NEW YORK STATE; ASSEMBLY; SEPTEMBER 10TH 1777
11b	(Return of NY Assembly to Kingston)	Historic marker for return of NYS Assembly to the Bogardus	(no agency or date)	N.W. CORNER MAIDEN LA. & FAIR ST.	Kingston	41°55′52.09″N 74°01′01.17″W	ON APRIL 23, 1977, A DELEGATION REPRESENTING; THE NEW YORK STATE; ASSEMBLY RETURNED TO THE; SITE OF THE ASSEMBLY'S; FIRST MEETING
12	SITE OF TAPPEN HOUSE	Historic marker for the Tappen House	NY State Historical Marker, 1927	S.W. CORNER N. FRONT & WALL STS.	Kingston	41°56′06.36″N 74°01′12.32″W	SITE OF; TAPPEN HOUSE; OCCUPIED BY GEORGE CLINTON; WHILE GOVERNOR OF STATE
13	VAN KEUREN HOMESTEAD	Historic marker for the Van Keuren Homestead	State Ed Dept, 1938	ST. JAMES ST. BETWEEN PINE & CLINTON AVES.	Kingston	41°55′50.7″N 74°00′52.3″W	VAN KEUREN HOMESTEAD; BURNED BY BRITISH OCT. 17, 1777. REBUILT AND OCCUPIED; BY DIRECT DESCENDANTS OF; ORIGINAL OWNER SINCE THEN.
14	COLONEL DEYO HOME			NYS 55 E. OF TRAFFIC CIRCLE	Lloyd		COLONEL DEYO HOME ERECTED 1805 BUILT AND OCCUPIED BY COLONEL JACOB DEYO 8TH REGIMENT, NEW YORK STATE GUARD
15	ELTING HOMESTEAD	Historic marker for the Elting Homestead	State Ed Dept, 1938	MAIN ST., S. OF ELTING PL., IN HIGHLAND	Lloyd	41°43′15.04″N 73°57′54.37″W	BUILT BY PHILIP ELTING 1817 WHO FOUNDED VILLAGE OF HIGHLAND ON HIS FARM WHICH WAS DEVISED BYT HIS GRANDFATHER ABRAHAM ELTING TO NOAH ELTING APRIL 1797
16	ELTING'S LANDING			W. OF R.R., NEAR RIVER IN HIGHLAND	Lloyd		BOMBARDED BY BRITISH 1777 NOAH ELTING'S FERRY 1793 HORSE DRAWN FLAT BOAT 1819 "DUTCHESS AND ULSTER", STEAM POWER FERRY EST. 1830
17	HIGHLAND LANDING	Historic marker with the Yelverton house behind it	State Ed Dept, 1949	E. END OF MAIN ST., HIGHLAND	Lloyd	41°43′01.1″N 73°57′00.1″W	YELVERTON'S LANDING 1777 VALENTINE BAKER'S LANDING 1786 NEW PALTZ LANDING 1798 THE TOWN'S SHIPPING CENTER FOR A CENTURY AND A HALF
18	PRESBYTERIAN CHURCH	Historic marker for the church	State Ed Dept, 1932	CHURCH & GROVE STS., HIGHLAND	Lloyd	41°43′10.38″N 73°57′55.44″W	ORGANIZED MAY 26, 1792, AS THE PRESBYTERIAN CONGREGA- TION OF NEW PALTZ. PRESENT EDIFICE ERECTED 1844.
19	REVOLUTIONARY DRILL FIELD 1775			US 9W S. OF TRAFFIC CIRCLE	Lloyd		9TH COMPANY THIRD ULSTER COUNTY REGIMENT COMMANDED BY CAPTAIN PELEG RANSOM
20	ULSTER COUNTY			NYS 55 AT W. ENTRANCE TO MID-HUDSON BRIDGE	Lloyd		ONE OF ORIGINAL COUNTIES OF NEW YORK STATE, 1683, RECEIVED ITS NAME FROM THE EARLDOM IN IRELAND OF JAMES, DUKE OF YORK.
21	1 1/2 MILE	Historic marker for the church	State Ed Dept, 1939	NYS 213 AT HIGH FALLS	Marbletown	41°49′42.3696″N 74°07′59.178″W	1 1/2 MILE SITE OF CLOVE REFORMED CHURCH; ORGANIZED 1807. MOVED TO PRESENT SITE; IN HIGH FALLS 1867
22	DAVIS TAVERN	Historic marker for Davis Tavern	State Ed Dept, 1935	Route 209 north of Marbletown, New York	Marbletown	41°52′50.88″N 74°06′56.16″W	DAVIS TAVERN FOR MANY YEARS BEFORE AND; AFTER THE REVOLUTION, THE; PUBLIC BUSINESS OF THE; TOWN OF MARBLETOWN WAS; TRANSACTED HERE.
23	OLD DEPUY HOUSE	Historic marker for the Depuy House	State Ed Dept, 1939	NYS 213 AT HIGH FALLS	Marbletown	41°49′37.85″N 74°07′39.32″W	OLD DEPUY HOUSE BUILT IN 1797 BY S. AND A. DEPUY, WHO KEPT A TAVERN HERE.
24	OLIVER HOUSE	What is left of the Oliver House marker	State Ed Dept, 1935	US 209 AT MARBLETOWN	Marbletown	41°52′48.18″N 74°06′56.1″W	IN ORIGINAL ANDREW OLIVER HOUSE HERE, THE NEW YORK LEGISLATURE MET FOR ONE MONTH, AFTER BURNING OF KINGSTON, OCTOBER, 1777.
25	SCHOONMAKER HOME	Historic marker for a Schoonmaker Home	State Ed Dept, 1935	NYS 213, E. OF HIGH FALLS, AT COXEN CREEK BRIDGE	Marbletown	41°49′51.96″N 74°06′37.7″W	BUILT IN 1760 BY CAP. FREDERICK SCHOONMAKER, REVOLUTIONARY OFFICER; HOME; FORTIFIED AND USED AS PLACE; OF REFUGE DURING THE WAR.
26	SITE OF COLONIAL CHURCH	Historic marker for a Colonial church	State Ed Dept, 1935	US 209 AT MARBLETOWN	Marbletown	41°52′45.6126″N 74°06′56.9262″W	SITE OF COLONIAL CHURCH HERE STOOD THE EARLIEST; CHURCH IN THIS VICINITY, ORGANIZED 1737, BUILT 1746, THE FIRST MINISTER WAS; BURIED BENEATH THE PULPIT.
27	TACK TAVERN	Historic marker for the Tack Tavern	State Ed Dept, 1938	US 209 AT STONE RIDGE	Marbletown	41°50′55.32″N 74°08′35.52″W	TACK TAVERN HOME OF JOHANNES TACK, WHERE COURT CONVENED AFTER; BURNING OF KINGSTON BY THE; BRITISH, OCTOBER, 1777. FIRST SCHOOL WAS NEARBY.
28	DISCOVERY OF CEMENT	Historic marker for the (local) discovery of cement	State Ed Dept, 1939	NYS 213 AT HIGH FALLS	Marbletown	41°49′37.56″N 74°07′34.93″W	DISCOVERY OF CEMENT AT BRUCEVILLE, NATHANIEL; BRUCE, BURNED IN A BLACKSMITH'S; FORGE, SOME NATIVE ROCK AND; DISCOVERED CEMENT IN 1818.
29	JOHN BURROUGHSBY S. AND A. DEPUY			CHURCH ST., S. OF NYS 213 IN HIGH FALLS	Marbletown		JOHN BURROUGHSBY S. AND A. DEPUY AMERICAN NATURALIST TAUGHT SCHOOL AT HIGH FALLS IN 1857 NEAR PRESENT BUILDING
30	OLD STONE AQUEDUCT	Historic marker for an aqueduct that was part of the D&H Canal	State Ed Dept, 1940	NYS 213 AT HIGH FALLS	Marbletown	41°49′38.64″N 74°07′39″W	OLD STONE AQUEDUCT BUILT IN 1825 BY D. & H. CANAL CO.; COMPLETED 1828; ENLARGED IN 1842 AND 1851; ABANDONED FEB. 23, 1899.
31	BEVIER HOUSE	Historic marker for the house	State Ed Dept, 1935	SE CORNER HUGUENOT ST. & BROADHEAD AVE., NEW PALTZ	New Paltz	41°45′07.1″N 74°05′17.4″W	BUILT BY LOUIS BEVIER, THE PATENTEE, IN 1698. ELTING HOMESTEAD FROM 1740. THIS HOUSE HAS AN INTERESTING SUB-CELLAR
32	DEYO HOUSE	Historic marker for the house	State Ed Dept, 1935	HUGUENOT ST., IN NEW PALTZ	New Paltz	41°45′04.4″N 74°05′17.0″W	BUILT BY PIERRE DEYO, ONE OF TWELVE ORIGINAL PATENTEES OF NEW PALTZ, IN 1692.
33	DIE PFALZ	hHistoric marker for the house	State Ed Dept, 1935	HUGUENOT & N. FRONT STS., IN NEW PALTZ	New Paltz	41°45′02.8″N 74°05′17.1″W	A FRENCH HUGUENOT VILLAGE GOVERNED BY "THE DUSINE", A BODY OF 12 MEN CHOSEN ANNUALLY. FOR 100 YEARS THE ONLY FORM OF GOVERNMENT.
34	DUBOIS HOUSE	Historic marker for the house	State Ed Dept, 1935	HUGUENOT ST., IN NEW PALTZ	New Paltz	41°45′05.4″N 74°05′17.9″W	THE FORT BUILT IN 1705 BY DANIEL DUBOIS. SITE FIRST REDOUBT. THERE ARE PORT HOLES IN THE EAST END.
35	FREER HOUSE	hHistoric marker for the house	State Ed Dept, 1935	HUGUENOT ST., IN NEW PALTZ	New Paltz	41°45′10.6″N 74°05′18″W	BUILT 1720 BY HUGO FREER, ONE OF TWELVE ORIGINAL PATENTEES OF NEW PALTZ. THE LOW HOUSE AFTER 1732.
36	HASBROUCK HOUSE	Historic marker for the house	State Ed Dept, 1935	HUGUENOT ST., IN NEW PALTZ	New Paltz	41°45′09.7″N 74°05′17.8″W	BUILT IN 1712, BY ABRAHAM, THE PATENTEE, ONCE SOLDIER IN ENGLISH ARMY, FRIEND OF GOV. ANDROS. KITCHEN SCENE OF COCK FIGHTS.
37	JEAN HASBROUCK	Historic marker for the house	State Ed Dept, 1935	HUGUENOT & N. FRONT STS., IN NEW PALTZ	New Paltz	41°45′03.0″N 74°05′17.4″W	JEAN HASBROUCK HOUSE BUILT IN 1712, BY; THE PATENTEE; NOW HOME OF; THE HUGUENOT PATRIOTIC, HISTORICAL AND MONUMENTAL; SOCIETY, SINCE 1899 (n.b. sign was redone since 2011, used to be just "Huguenot Historical Society" but they apparently became patriotic and monumental)
38	NEW PALTZ	Historic marker for New Paltz and Historic marker for New Paltz	State Ed Dept, 1935	NYS 208, S. OF NEW PALTZ also same on NE CORNER MAIN & N. FRONT STS., IN NEW PALTZ	New Paltz	41°44′53.74″N 74°05′05.64″W and 41°45′02.82″N 74°05′17.08″W	FOUNDED 1678. SIX HOUSES BUILT BEFORE 1720 ARE ON HUGUENOT STREET, ON THE WALKILL RIVER, HOMES OF REFUGEES OF FRANCE.
39	SITE OF THE "OWL" CHURCH	a picture of the marker	State Ed Dept, 1935	CO. RD. W. OF NEW PALTZ, 1 MI. S. OF NYS 299	New Paltz	41°43′53.4″N 74°06′44.3″W	CONFERENTIA CHURCH PARTY; ORGANIZED 1767, TO MAINTAIN; CONTACT WITH CLASSIS OF; NORTH AMSTERDAM, HOLLAND, JOINED PALTZ CHURCH, 1783.
40	SITE OF WALLOON CHURCH	Historic marker for the house	State Ed Dept, 1935	HUGUENOT ST., W. OF N. FRONT ST., IN NEW PALTZ	New Paltz	41°45′01.9″N 74°05′18.1″W	BUILT OF LOGS, FIRST CHURCH-SCHOOL, 1783, FIRST CHURCH OS STONE 1717. CALLED "OLD FRENCH CHURCH", PRECURSOR REFORMED CHURCH.
40.5	1799 HOUSE	Historic marker for the house	Huguenot Historical Society (no date)	Huguenot St, southwest of North Front St	New Paltz	41°45′00.7″N 74°05′19.8″W	BUILT BY EZEKIEL ELTING AS A HOME AND STORE. ORIGINAL GAMBREL ROOF DESTROYED IN 1888 BLIZZARD. 1968 PURCHASED BY LE FEVRE FAMILY ASSOC. MAINTAINED HHS AND LE FEVRE FAMILY.
41	STONE CHURCH - 1773	Historic marker for the house	State Ed Dept, 1935	HUGUENOT ST., NEAR BROADHEAD AVE., NEW PALTZ	New Paltz	41°45′07.8″N 74°05′18.3″W	FIRST STONE CHURCH, 1717. SERVICES IN FRENCH TO 1753, DUTCH LANGUAGE TO 1800. CHURCH CORNER STONE SEEN AT SOUTH WALL OF PORTICO.
42	ULSTER COUNTY			NYS 32, S. OF PLATTEKILL, AT ULSTER-ORANGE CO. LINE	Plattekill	Marker no longer exists; former site is 41°36′14.9394″N 74°04′28.4412″W.	ONE OF ORIGINAL COUNTIES OF NEW YORK STATE, 1683, RECEIVED ITS NAME FROM THE EARLDOM IN IRELAND OF JAMES, DUKE OF YORK.
43	ALTON BROOKS PARKER	Historic marker for school Parker was principal of	State Ed Dept, 1932	US 209, N. OF ACCORD	Rochester	41°47′36.41″N 74°13′26.41″W	MAY 14, 1852 - MAY 10, 1926 PRINCIPAL OF THIS SCHOOL, 1870–71 CHIEF JUDGE OF THE NEW YORK STATE COURT OF APPEALS, 1897-1904 CANDIDATE FOR PRESIDENT OF U.S.; 1904
44	COLONIAL TAVERN	Post where marker stood	State Ed Dept, 1936	US 209, S. OF ACCORD	Rochester	Marker no longer exists; former site is 41°47′23.046″N 74°14′55.485″W. Marker appears in Google Street View in May 2009.	SILES BOUCK, SCOUT TAKEN IN INDIAN AND TORY RAID IN 1779, TO FORT NIAGARA, CAME BACK HERE, WHILE NEIGHBORS WERE HOLDING A MEETING
45	ROCHESTER CHURCH	Historic marker for the Rochester Church	State Ed Dept, 1938	US 209, S. OF ACCORD	Rochester	41°47′25.77″N 74°14′38.45″W	REV. NUCELLA PREACHED, 1695 LOG CHURCH BUILT, 1700 2 STONE CHURCHES, 1743, 1860, 2 OTHER CHURCHES BURNED PRESENT 6TH ON SAME SPOT
46	SITE OF INDIAN RAID	Historic marker for a Native American raid	(no agency or date)	US 209 AT PINE BUSH	Rochester	41°47′04.19″N 74°16′52.75″W	SITE OF INDIAN RAID IN COLONIAL CHURCH WHICH; STOOD HERE, 1778, SETTLERS; FORTIFIED THEMSELVES, AND; SUCCESSFULLY FOUGHT OFF; ATTACK OF INDIAN RAIDERS.
47	SITE OF TRAINING FIELD	Historic marker for training field site	State Ed Dept, 1935	US 209, N. OF ACCORD	Rochester	41°47′34.08″N 74°13′34.68″W	SITE OF TRAINING FIELD COLONIAL MILITIA, IN THE; FRENCH AND INDIAN AND; REVOLUTIONARY WARS, MET; FOR TRAINING IN A FIELD; AT THIS PLACE.
48	SITE OF COLONIAL FORT	Historic marker for the site of a colonial fort	State Ed Dept, 1938	US 209 N. OF KERHONKSON	Rochester	41°46′53.42″N 74°17′27.45″W	HERE ON DEYO'S HILL; STOOD A FORT PROTECTING; EARLY SETTLERS FROM INDIANS
49	TOM QUICK FARM	hiHistoric marker for the Tom Quick farm	(no agency or date)	US 209, N. OF ACCORD	Rochester	41°47′28.34″N 74°14′29.18″W	HOME OF TOM QUICK, BOUGHT; FROM HARMON HEKUN, INDIAN, 1676; QUICK WAS KILLED BY; INDIANS AND HIS SON SLEW; MANY RED MEN IN REVENGE. 1904
50	CREEKLOCKS	Historic marker for the locks	State Ed Dept, 1935	CREEKLOCKS RD., CREEKLOCKS [Hamlet]	Rosendale	41°52′05.1702″N 74°02′37.6044″W	ORIGINALLY WAGENDALL. RENAMED 1825 WHEN DELAWARE; AND HUDSON CANAL WAS BUILT. CANAL ENTERED CREEK HERE.
51	D. & H. CANAL	Historic marker for the D&H Canal with the Rosendale Trestle in the background	State Ed Dept, 1935	NYS 213 W. OF ROSENDALE	Rosendale	41°50′37.35″N 74°05′19.51″W	STARTED 1825, OPENED 1828. IMPORTANT WATERWAY IN THE DEVELOPMENT OF NEW YORK STATE, CONNECTING DELAWARE AND HUDSON RIVERS.
52	FORDING PLACE	Historic marker for this Fording Place	State Ed Dept, 1935	NYS 32 AT ROSENDALE	Rosendale	41°50′44.64″N 74°04′26.82″W	USED BY GEN. CLINTON'S FORCES, ON WAY FROM NEWBURGH TO DEFEND KINGSTON, FROM BRITISH RAIDERS IN OCTOBER, 1777.
53	FREER HOUSE			NYS 32 S. OF TILLSON	Rosendale		BUILT 1765 BY JACOB FREER, GRANDSON OF HUGO FREER, NEW PALTZ PATENTEE; FIRST SETTLED BY FAMILY IN 1730 CALLED "HALF MOON".
54	GRIST MILL			NYS 213 W. OF ROSENDALE	Rosendale		OPERATED IN 1809 BY JACOB LOW SNYDER, EARLY SETTLER; IN 1825 BY JUDGE LUCAS ELMENDORF. CEMENT GROUND HERE FOR D. & H. CANAL.
55	HOME OF ABRAHAM VAN WAGENEN	Historic marker for this home	State Ed Dept, 1935	CREEKLOCKS RD., CREEKLOCKS [Hamlet]	Rosendale	41°52′26.24″N 74°02′33.81″W	HOME OF ABRAHAM VAN WAGENEN AN ORIGINAL SETTLER, BUILT, 1725–1730.
56	JOPPENBERGH	Historic marker for Joppenbergh mountain	State Ed Dept, 1935	NYS 213 W. OF ROSENDALE	Rosendale	Marker no longer exists; former site is 41°50′36.96″N 74°05′15.18″W. Marker appears in Waymarking.com and in Google Street View in May 2009.	JOPPENBERGH - JACOB'S MOUNT, NAMED FOR COL. JACOBUS RUTSEN, FIRST SETTLER, IN 1680
57	LEFEVRE HOUSE				Rosendale		BUILT 1780; SINCE 1810 HOME OF LEFEVRE FAMILY, DESCENDANTS OF SIMON, NEW PALTZ PATENTEE, CALLED BLOEMENDAL.
58	MEETING HOUSE	Historic marker for the Meeting House in Tillson	State Ed Dept, 1935	GRIST MILL RD., TILLSON	Rosendale	41°49′47.89″N 74°03′55.15″W	FRIENDS' CHURCH, BUILT IN 1800. PHEBE TILLSON WAS THE FIRST RECOMMENDED MINISTER.
59	NEWKIRK TAVERN	Historic marker for the Newkirk Tavern in Maple Hill	State Ed Dept, 1935	NYS 32 AT MAPLE HILL	Rosendale	41°51′54.1″N 74°03′38.5″W	BUILT IN 1781 BY GERRIT NEWKIRK. A FAMOUS HOSTERLRY.
60	PERRINE'S BRIDGE			NYS 32 S. OF TILLSON	Rosendale		ERECTED IN 1850. ONE OF THE FEW OLD COVERED BRIDGES STILL STANDING IN NEW YORK STATE.
61	PETRUS VAN WAGENEN	Historic marker for the house	State Ed Dept, 1935	SW CORNER CREEKLOCKS RD. & MAIN ST., BLOOMINGTON	Rosendale	41°52′29.712″N 74°02′31.3188″W	PETRUS VAN WAGENEN ONE OF ORIGINAL SETTLERS; OF WAGENDALL, OCCUPIED BY; VAN WAGENEN FAMILIES, BUILT; THIS HOUSE IN 1699.
62	REFORMED PROTESTANT DUTCH CHURCH	Historic marker for the church	State Ed Dept, 1935	CHURCH ST., W. OF MAIN ST., BLOOMINGTON	Rosendale	41°52′42.978″N 74°02′42.2946″W	REFORMED PROTESTANT DUTCH CHURCH; FIRST ORGANIZED 1797, BURNED 1846, REBUILT ON; PRESENT LOCATION, 1847.
63	ROSENDALE CEMENT			NYS 213 W. OF ROSENDALE	Rosendale		ROSENDALE CEMENT DISCOVERED HERE IN 1826. FIRST COMMERCIAL MILL OPERATED HERE 1826 BY WATSON E. LAWRENCE, CALLED LAWRENCEVILLE.
64	RUTSEN HOUSE			NYS 32 AT ROSENDALE	Rosendale		FIRST HOUSE BUILT IN TOWN BY JACOBUS RUTSEN IN 1680. JACOBUS RUTSEN HARDENBERGH GEN. GEORGE WASHINGTON.
65	SITE OF DE WITT HOUSE	Historic marker for the house	State Ed Dept, 1935	NYS 32 AT BLOOMINGTON	Rosendale	41°53′15.1656″N 74°02′36.888″W	SITE OF; DE WITT HOUSE; BUILT 1736; DESTROYED 1930; HOME OF COL. CHARLES DE WITT, MEMBER PROVINCIAL CONGRESS; CALLED CROCODILE INN, ABOUT 1800.
66	SITE OF DE WITT MILL	Historic marker for the mill	State Ed Dept, 1935	NYS 32 AT BLOOMINGTON	Rosendale	41°53′14.69″N 74°02′37.366″W	SITE OF; DE WITT MILL; ERECTED ABOUT 1750 BY COL. CHARLES DE WITT. FLOUR; GROUND HERE FOR AMERICAN; ARMY IN THE REVOLUTION.
67	SITE OF TAVERN	Historic marker for the site	State Ed Dept, 1935	E. OF NYS 32 IN MAPLE HILL	Rosendale	41°51′53.2″N 74°03′45.1″W	SITE OF TAVERN, FIRST CHURCH ERECTED HERE IN 1797, REFORMED CHURCH OF BLOEMENDAL BURNED 1846, REBUILT 1847, AT NEW LOCATION AT BLOOMINGTON
68	SNYDER HOME	Historic marker for the Snyder Home	State Ed Dept, 1935	CO. RD. AT COTTEKILL	Rosendale	41°51′08.3″N 74°06′12.94″W	SNYDER HOME COMMUNITY FIRST SETTLED; 1755 BY JACOB SNYDER, HOUSE ERECTED 1788; HOME; OF CHRISTOPHER SNYDER, REVOLUTIONARY SOLDIER.
69	TAWAERI TAQUI	Historic marker for Tawaeri Taqui	State Ed Dept, 1935	SPRINGTOWN RD., TILLSON	Rosendale	41°49′46.96″N 74°04′35.58″W	NORTHWEST CORNER OF PATENT GRANTED TO THE HUGUENOT SETTLERS OF NEW PALTZ, IN 1677, IS ONE HALF MILE WEST.
70	TILLSON HOME	Historic marker for the Tillson Home	State Ed Dept, 1935		Rosendale	41°49′44.58″N 74°04′13.8″W	FIRST ESTABLISHED IN 1778. HOME OF JOB TILLSON, SCOUT IN REVOLUTIONARY ARMY AT 12 YEARS. COMMUNITY NAMED IN HONOR OF FAMILY.
71	WAGENDALL	Historic marker for the home	State Ed Dept, unreadable date	CREEKLOCKS RD., CREEKLOCKS	Rosendale	41°52′28.6242″N 74°02′30.3138″W	ON THIS FARM IS HOME OF JACOB AARTSEN VAN WAGENEN, BUILT 1669, FIRST SETTLER, AND HOME OF JOHANNES VAN WAGENEN, BUILT 1775.
72	WHITE'S MILL	Historic marker for Whites Mill	State Ed Dept, 1935	CO. RD. AT WHITEPORT	Rosendale	41°52′55.76″N 74°03′04.43″W	BUILT 1830 BY HUGH WHITE, SUPPLIED CEMENT FOR CROTON; RESERVOIR, WHITEPORT NAMED; TO HONOR HUGH WHITE.
73	BARCLAY HEIGHTS	NY State historic marker for the Barclay Heights in Saugerties, NY	(no agency or date)	US 9W, S. OF BARCLAY ST., IN SAUGERTIES	Saugerties	42°03′54.38″N 73°56′54.58″W	NAMED FOR HENRY BARCLAY; 1778–1851. EARLY SETTLER; WHO FOUNDED TRINITY CHURCH, UTILIZED LOCAL WATER POWER; AND GREATLY PROMOTED INDUSTRY
74	BRICK CHURCH	NY State historic marker for the Brick Church	State Ed Dept, 1936	LIVINGSTON ST., W. OF NYS 32, SAUGERTIES	Saugerties	42°04′41.4″N 73°57′22.0″W	BUILT 1827. USED FOR WORSHIP; UNTIL 1852. THEN SOLD FOR; USE AS AN ACADEMY. LATER; KNOWN AND USED AS; BURHANS BLACKSMITH SHOP
75	BRINK HOMESTEAD	The marker	State Ed Dept, 1936	CO. RD., 1-1/2 MIS. S. OF MT. MARION	Saugerties	42°01′19.1″N 73°59′46.4″W	OWNED CONTINUOUSLY BY FAMILY OF CORNELIUS LAMBERTSEN BRINK, PURCHASER, 1688, OF SECOND LAND GRANT IN TOWN. ART OF ORIGINAL HOUSE REMAINS.
76	FLATBUSH REFORMED CHURCH OF SAUGERTIES, N. Y.	The marker	State Ed Dept, 1938	NYS 32, 1-1/2 MIS. S. OF GLASCO	Saugerties	42°01′22.4″N 73°57′18.7″W	FLATBUSH REFORMED CHURCH OF SAUGERTIES, N. Y. ORGANIZED JUNE 9, 1807. BUILDING ERECTED 1808.
77	GLASCO TURNPIKE	Historic marker for the Glasco Turnpike on Rt. 212 east of Woodstock Historic marker for the Glasco Turnpike on in Glasco, NY	State Ed Dept, 1935	Rt. 212, east of Woodstock; NYS Route 32 and Main Street in Hamlet of Glasco	Saugerties	42°03′01.54″N 74°04′07.02″W and 42°02′36″N 73°57′12.5″W	GLASCO TURNPIKE ROAD FROM EARLY GLASS WORKS; ON THE UPPER SAWKILL, TO; SHIPPING POINT ON HUDSON, ABOVE RONDOUT. NAMED FOR; SIGN ON COMPANY'S WAREHOUSE.
78	INDIAN CAVE	NY State historic marker for an Indian Cave	State Ed Dept, 1936	NYS 32, SO. OF KATSBAAN	Saugerties	42°06′34″N 73°58′06.5″W	HOME OF "NACHTE JAN", LAST; INDIAN OF REGION. FRIEND; OF CORNELIUS PERSEN, OFTEN; WARNED HIM OF ATTACKS; BY INDIANS AND TORIES.
79	KATSBAAN CHURCH	NY State historic marker for the Katsbaan Church	State Ed Dept, 1936	CO. RD., 8 MIS. N. OF KATSBAAN	Saugerties	42°07′16.4″N 73°57′42.5″W	ERECTED 1732 KNOWN AS "DE STEENEKERK OP DE KATS; BAAN." REBUILT 1867. IN; NORTH WALL ARE STONES WITH; NAMES OF BUILDERS.
80	KIERSTED HOUSE	NY State historic marker for the Kiersted House	State Ed Dept, 1936	MAIN ST., E. OF WASHINGTON AVE., SAUGERTIES	Saugerties	42°04′44″N 73°56′58.3″W	KIERSTED HOUSE OF PRE-REVOLUTIONARY DAYS. HOME OF DR. CHRISTOPHER KIERSTED, FIRST PHYSICIAN IN TOWN, RENDERED SERVICE DURING; REVOLUTIONARY WAR
81	KING'S ROAD	NY State historic marker for the Kings Road	State Ed Dept, 1936	NYS 32, 100 YDS. N. OF THRUWAY ENTRANCE NO. 20	Saugerties	42°05′14.4″N 73°58′26.4″W	OLDEST HIGHWAY IN TOWN, 1703. FIRST KNOWN AS "FOOTPATH" TO; ALBANY, THEN AS THE "QUEEN'S HIGHWAY", LATER AS "THE OLD KING'S ROAD."
82	LUTHERAN CHURCH	NY State historic marker for the Lutheran Church	State Ed Dept, 1936	US 9W AT WEST CAMP	Saugerties	42°07′26.5″N 73°55′55.6″W	ORGANIZED IN 1710 BY THE; PALATINES. FIRST PASTOR; REV. JOSHUA KOCHERTHAL. FIRST CHURCH NEAR SITE; OF PRESENT CHURCH.
83	MYER HOMESTEAD			CO. RD., 1-1/2 MIS. S. OF NYS 32	Saugerties		LAND DEEDED 1724 TO CHRISTIAN MYER, PROMINENT PALATINE SETTLER; EIGHTEEN DESCENDANTS SERVED IN REVOLUTIONARY WAR
84	MYNDERSE HOUSE	NY State historic marker for the Mynderse House	State Ed Dept, 1936	MYNDERSE ST., S. OF US 9W, IN SAUGERTIES	Saugerties	42°04′39.4″N 73°56′35.1″W	JOHN PERSON, PATENTEE 1712, BUILT GRIST MILL AND EST'D; FERRY ACROSS ESOPUS CREEK. DEEDED TO DAUGHTER OF MYNDERT; MYNDERSE. ADDITION BUILT 1743
85	POST TAVERN SITE	NY State historic marker for the Post Tavern Site	State Ed Dept, 1936	MAIN ST., W. OF PARTITION ST., SAUGERTIES	Saugerties	42°04′40″N 73°57′09.8″W	USED AS PATRIOTS MEETING; PLACE DURING REVOLUTION. ARTICLES OF ASSOCIATION; SIGNED HERE. RELIGIOUS; SERVICES HELD HERE 1815–29.
86	SAWYER'S MILL	NY State historic marker for Sawyer's Mill	State Ed Dept, 1936	US 9W N. OF SAUGERTIES AT BRIDGE	Saugerties	42°05′03.2″N 73°56′35.6″W	STOOD ON THIS SITE 1663. SAUGERTIES DERIVED ITS; NAME FROM THE DUTCH; WORD "DE ZAAGERTJES".
87	SCHOONMAKER HOMESTEAD	NY State historic marker for the Schoonmaker Home	State Ed Dept, 1936	MAIN ST., W. OF MYNDERSE ST. IN SAUGERTIES	Saugerties	42°04′49.2312″N 73°56′40.293″W	ELDER KATSBAAN CHURCH, MEMBER; OF GENERAL COMMITTEE OF ARTICLES; OF ASSOCIATION. OCCUPIED CON- TINUOUSLY BY DESCENDANTS. PRE-REVOLUTIONARY HOUSE.
88	SETTLERS CAPTURED	Historic marker for Settlers Captured	State Ed Dept, 1935	NYS 212, E. OF WOODSTOCK	Saugerties	42°02′32.24″N 74°04′43.26″W	SETTLERS CAPTURED JUNE 18, 1780, NEAR THIS; SPOT, PETER SHORT AND PETER; MILLER WERE CAPTURED BY; TORIES DISGUISED AS INDIANS; AND TAKEN TO CANADA.
89	TAVERN SITE	NY State historic marker for a Tavern Site	State Ed Dept, 1937	NO. OF NYS 32, AT KATSBAAN	Saugerties	42°06′40″N 73°58′03.4″W	TAVERN SITE KEPT BY CHRISTIAN FIERO. PUBLIC MEETING PLACE; DURING REVOLUTION. FIRST TOWN MEETING HELD; HERE APRIL 16, 1811.
90	ULSTER COUNTY		State Ed Dept, 1936	US 9W AT ULSTER-GREENE CO. LINE	Saugerties	Marker no longer exists; former site is 42°07′50.8″N 73°55′41.9″W. Marker appears in Google Street View in May 2012 and June 2009.	ONE OF ORIGINAL COUNTIES OF NEW YORK STATE, 1683, RECEIVED ITS NAME FROM THE EARLDOM IN IRELAND OF JAMES, DUKE OF YORK.
91	WEST CAMP			US 9W AT WEST CAMP	Saugerties		SETTLED 1710 BY PALATINES FROM THE RHINELAND FOR PRODUCTION OF NAVAL STORES. BUILT CHURCH AND SCHOOL DURING FIRST WINTER.
92	SITE OF NEW FORT			OFF CO. RD., 1 MI. S. OLD SHAWANGUNK CHURCH	Shandaken		23 INDIANS KILLED, 13 CAPTURED. 23 CAPTIVE WOMEN AND CHILDREN RELEASED. 3 SOLDIERS KILLED, SEPT. 5, 1663
93	ULSTER COUNTY	Historic marker for Ulster County	State Ed Dept, 1936	South Side Rt 28 at Ulster - Delaware Co Line	Shandaken	42°08′53.83″N 74°29′45.61″W	ONE OF ORIGINAL COUNTIES OF NEW YORK STATE, 1683 RECEIVED ITS NAME FROM THE EARLDOM IN IRELAND OF JAMES, DUKE OF YORK.
94	ABRAM BEVIER	a picture of the current marker	(no agency or date)	US 209 AT NAPANOCH	Wawarsing	41°44′33.0″N 74°22′07.0″W	ABRAM BEVIER WHOSE HOUSE STOOD HERE, HAD A SMALL CANNON, WHICH THE INDIANS FEARED, AND WHICH MADE HIS HOME OF FORT FOR SETTLERS IN RAID OF 1781.
95	BEVIER HOUSE			US 209 AT WAWARSING	Wawarsing		AUG. 12, 1781, INDIANS RAIDING RONDOUT VALLEY FIRED HOUSE OF CORNELIUS BEVIER, BUT FLAMES WERE PUT OUT BY NEGRO WOMAN SLAVE.
96	CORNELIUS DEPUY HOUSE	Historic marker for another Depuy House	Mc Bride Family, 1969	US 209, N. OF WAWARSING	Wawarsing	41°45′51.95″N 74°20′32.78″W	ATTACKED BY INDIANS, AUG. 12, 1781. GARRET VAN WAGENEN, 16, SHOT THE LEADER, AND SCARED THE OTHERS AWAY.
97	HOME OF JOHANNES G. HARDENBERGH	Historic marker for the home of Johannes Hardenbergh	State Ed Dept, 1932	US 209, 1 MI. S. OF KERHONKSON	Wawarsing	41°46′15.92″N 74°18′56.7″W	ERECTED 1762. NEW YORK RECORDS DEPOSITED HERE OCT. 12, 1777 BEFORE KINGSTON WAS BURNED BY THE BRITISH
98	OLD MINE ROAD			US 209, N. OF SPRING GLEN	Wawarsing		ESOPUS - MINISINK TRAIL INDIAN TRAIL CONNECTING DELAWARE VALLEY WITH HUDSON RIVER. USED BEFORE AND DURING REVOLUTION
99	SITE OF LONG HOUSE	Historic marker for the Long House	State Ed Dept, 1938	US 209 AT WAWARSING	Wawarsing	41°45′32.18″N 74°21′25.89″W	AT FOOT OF HIGH BLUFF STOOD; INDIAN COUNCIL HOUSE DESTROYED; BY CAPT. KREGIER, AUGUST 31, 1663
100	SITE OF FIRST MILL			US 209 AT WAWARSING	Wawarsing		SITE OF FIRST MILL HERE, ON VERNOOY KILL, WAS FIRST MILL, BROUGHT FROM HOLLAND AND SET UP EARLY IN THE EIGHTEENTH CENTURY BY CORNELIUS VERNOOY.
101	ULSTER COUNTY	Historic marker for Ulster County	State Ed Dept, 1936	US 209, S. OF SPRING GLEN	Wawarsing	41°39′41.79″N 74°25′31.02″W	ONE OF ORIGINAL COUNTIES OF NEW YORK STATE, 1683, RECEIVED ITS NAME FROM THE EARLDOM IN IRELAND OF JAMES, DUKE OF YORK.
102	"DOWN RENT" WAR			S. OF NYS 212, AT LAKE HILL	Woodstock		REBELLION AGAINST "THREE LIFE" LEASES CAUSED RIOTS HERE BY FARMERS DISGUISED AS INDIANS, 1845, AND LED TO ABOLISHMENT OF SYSTEM.
103	BAEHR'S STORE	Historic marker for Baehr's Store	State Ed Dept, 1935	NYS 212, AT BEARSVILLE	Woodstock	42°02′26.39″N 74°09′15.87″W	BAEHR'S STORE CHRISTIAN BAEHR, A GERMAN; PEDDLER, FOUNDED STORE ON; SAWKILL, IN 1839. EARLY IN; TANBARK INDUSTRY, IT GAVE; NAME TO HAMLET BEARSVILLE.
104	BLUESTONE QUARRY			CO. RD., NE OF WOODSTOCK	Woodstock		THE CALIFORNIA QUARRY, ON OVERLOOK MOUNTAIN, NORTH, WAS ONE OF THE LARGEST OF THESE INDUSTRIES WHICH FLOURISHED, 1839–1900.
105	ELIAS HASBROUCH			N. OF NYS 212 AT LAKE HILL	Woodstock	42°04′04.2″N 74°11′12.1″W	CAPTAIN IN AMERICAN ARMY, 1775–1783; AT QUEBEC WITH GEN. MONTGOMERY; BURIED HERE. HIS HOUSE IN KINGSTON WAS BURNED BY BRITISH, 1777.
106, 107	GLASCO TURNPIKE			CO. RD., NE OF WOODSTOCK, also CO. RD., N OF WOODSTOCK	Woodstock		ROAD FROM EARLY GLASS WORKS ON THE UPPER SAWKILL, TO SHIPPING POINT ON HUDSON, ABOVE RONDOUT. NAMED FOR SIGN ON COMPANY'S WAREHOUSE.
108	GLASS FACTORY			1/2 MI. N. OF SHADY	Woodstock		GLASS FACTORY BRISTOL (SHADY) 1825–1856. ONE OF EARLY INDUSTRIES IN CATSKILLS; MADE WINDOW GLASS AND DOMES FOR WAX FLOWERS, STILL FOUND IN WOODSTOCK.
109	OLD WOODSTOCK MILL	New York State Historical marker for the Old Woodstock Mill		SE CORNER NYS 212 AND NYS 375	Woodstock	42°02′10.8″N 74°06′39.3″W	GRIST MILL, 1788-1925 ALSO RUN AS CARDING MILL, 1836 AND LATER, BY JOSHUA NASH.
110	OLD ZENA MILL	Historic marker for Old Zena Mill	State Ed Dept, 1935	CO. RD., N. OF ZENA	Woodstock	42°02′01.44″N 74°05′01.68″W	OLD ZENA MILL OPERATED PRIOR TO 1750 BY; MAJOR JOHANNES HARDENBERGH. GRANTED TO EPHRAIM VAN KEUREN. LATER RUN BY CAPT. WILLIAM; SWART AND WILHELMUS ROWE.
111	SITE OF NEWKIRK HOUSE	New York State Historical marker for the Newkirk House		NYS 212, AT VILLAGE CENTER IN WOODSTOCK	Woodstock	42°02′27.8406″N 74°07′06.2472″W	ONE OF THE EARLIEST HOUSES IN WOODSTOCK, OCCUPIED 1777 BY BARRET NEWKIRK, LATER BY JACOBUS ELTINGE.
112	TANNERY BROOK	New York State Historical marker for the Tannery Brook		NYS 212, W. OF WOODSTOCK	Woodstock	42°02′25.70″N 74°07′11.56″W	TANNERS, USING HEMLOCK BARK, RAN MILLS HERE, 1830–1870. HIDES WERE BROUGHT IN SHIPS UP THE HUDSON TO KINGSTON.
113	ZENA - WAGHKONK	Historic marker for Zena Waghkonk	State Ed Dept, 1935	CO. RD. AT ZENA	Woodstock	42°01′00.74″N 74°04′35.86″W	ZENA-WAGHKONK ZENA WAS CALLED WAGHKONK OR; AWAGHKONK, INDIAN FOR LOW; MEADOWS OR MARSH; DUTCH; TRANSLATED IT VAN DAAL, OR; VALLEY; ENGLISH VANDALE.
114	Old Dutch Church	Historic marker for the Old Dutch Church	NY State Historical Marker, 1927	272 Wall Street, Kingston	Kingston	41°55′56.45″N 74°01′09.74″W	SITE OF FIRST; OLD DUTCH CHURCH; BUILT 1661
115	Original Kingston Academy Site	Historic marker for the original site of the Kingston Academy	(no agency or date)	81 Green Street, Kingston	Kingston	41°55′59.98″N 74°01′15.67″W	ORIGINAL SITE; KINGSTON ACADEMY; FOUNDED 1974; MOVED TO ACADEMY GREEN 1830; BOARD OF TRUSTEES IN SERVICE FROM 1785 TO PRESENT
116	Wynkoop House	Historic marker for the Wynkpoop Hse	(no agency or date)	3705-3721 Main Street, Stone Ridge, NY (part of a historic district)	Marbletown	41°50′55.32″N 74°08′34.46″W	WYNKOOP HOUSE BUILT 1767-72 FOR MAJOR C.E. WYNKOOP, MERCHANT & PATRIOT; HONORED BY GEN. WASHINGTON'S; STAY NOV. 15, 1782; LOUNSBERY HOUSE 1818-1988
117	Keator Home	Historic marker for the Keator home	State Ed Dept, 1935	734 Binnewater Lane, Kingston	Kingston near Rosendale	41°51′30.03″N 74°05′06.79″W	KEATOR HOME BUILT ABOUT 1770 BY; FIRST SETTLER, KEATOR, COMMUNITY FORMERLY; CALLED KEATORS CORNERS
118	Westbrook House	Historic marker for the Westbrook House	(no agency or date)	Accord	Rochester	41°48′21.84″N 74°13′15.16″W	WESTBROOK HOUSE LAND ACQUIRED FROM INDIANS; IN 1696, JONATHAN WESTBROOK; ENGLISH OFFICER BUILT THIS; ORIGINAL WING IN 1700. BOUGHT; BY MARSHAL FAMILY IN 1924.
119	MAVERICK ROAD	Historic marker for Maverick Road	Woodstock Bicentennial, 1987		Woodstock	42°01′24.68″N 74°06′23.48″W	MAVERICK ROAD LEADS TO "THE MAVERICK"; FAMED FOR FESTIVAL, ART, THE AFTER, MUSIC; AND THE SIMPLE LIFE; FOUNDED 1906.
120	ROSENDALE LIBRARY	Historic marker for the Rosendale Library	(no agency or date (but must be =>1986))		Rosendale	41°50′43.98″N 74°04′33.6″W	ROSENDALE LIBRARY FORMERLY ALL SAINTS' CHAPEL; BUILT 1876 OF ROSENDALE; CEMENT. DEDICATED STATE AND; NATIONAL HISTORIC SITE; AUG. 11, 1986.
121	ALLIGERVILLE HISTORIC DISTRICT	Historic marker for Alligerville	Town of Rochester, 2015	in Alligerville center city	Rochester	41°47′49.2″N 74°10′41.9″W	ALLIGERVILLE HISTORIC DISTRICT LISTED ON THE; NATIONAL REGISTER OF; HISTORIC PLACES
122	WATERING TROUGH	Historic marker for a Water Trough	(no agency or date)		Rochester	41°48′07.2″N 74°10′39.36″W	THIS TRIANGULAR SPRING-FED WATERING TROUGH WAS USED DURING; THE ERA OF; HORSE DRAWN TRANSPORTATION
123	JOHN BURROUGHS	Historic marker pointing the school where Burroughs taught	State Ed Dept, 1939	213 and School Street, just south of but in High Falls, New York	Marbletown	41°49′24.68″N 74°07′39.39″W	JOHN BURROUGHS AMERICAN NATURALIST; TAUGHT SCHOOL AT HIGH FALLS; IN 1857 NEAR PRESENT BUILDING
124	Jacob Hasbrouck Jr. House (n.b. fully size house, Jacob's dad was named Jacob)	Historic marker for the Hasbrouck Junior House	Maj. J. Hasbrouck Trust (no date)	193 Huguenot Street New Paltz, New York	New Paltz	41°45′38.16″N 74°05′08.52″W	1786; MAJ. JACOB HASBROUCK, JR. HOUSE; MEMBER PROVINCIAL CONGRESS 1775; OFFICER 3RD REG. N.Y. MILITIA; GRANDSON OF JEAN HASBROUCK; THE PATENTEE; BIRTHPLACE OF JACOB M. HASBROUCK; 1ST MAYOR OF NEW PALTZ 1887; LAND TITLE VESTED BY FAILY WILLS
125	AFRICAN-AMERICAN BURIAL GROUND	Historic marker for an African American burial ground	Town and Village of New Paltz, 2000	190 Huguenot Street New Paltz, New York	New Paltz	41°45′34.05″N 74°05′08.19″W	SITE OF; AFRICAN-AMERICAN BURIAL GROUND; FRENCH HUGUENOTS WHO FOUNDED NEW PALTZ IN 1677 HAD USED ENSLAVED AFRICANS FOR CONSTRUCTION AND FARM WORK AS EARLY AS 1673. BY 1790, 179 ENSLAVED AFRICAN-AMERICANS AND 9 FREE PERSONS OF COLOR LIVED IN NEW PALTZ. SLAVERY OFFICIALLY ENDED IN NEW YORK STATE IN 1827, BUT MANY AFRICAN-AMERICANS REMAINED IN SERVITUDE UNTIL 1848. A BURIAL GROUND USED BY AFRICANS AND THEIR DESCENDANTS IS LOCATED NEAR THIS MARKER. AFRER THE CIVIL WAR, WHEN WHITES ALLOWED AFRICAN-AMERICAN BURIALS IN A SEGREGATED PORTION OF THE NEW PALTZ BURIAL CEMETERY ON PLAINS ROAD, THIS BURIAL GROUND WAS NO LONGER USED AND ITS EXISTENCE NEARLY FORGOTTEN.
126	ELTING CEMETERY	Historic marker for the Elting Cemetery	(no agency or date)	171 Huguenot Street New Paltz, New York	New Paltz	41°45′27.24″N 74°05′09.24″W	SITE OF; ELTING CEMETERY; JACOB ELTING'S DESCENDANTS DONATED THIS MEADOW AND FAMILY CEMETERY TO THE VILLAGE IN 2017. ONE OF THE EARLIEST FAMILIES OF NEW PALTZ, THESE ELTINGS GAVE THE BEVIER-ELTING HOUSE AND THE HARCOURT SANCTUARY TO THE HUGUENOT HISTORICAL SOCIETY AND ALSO CONTRIBUTED TO THE ELTING MEMORIAL LIBRARY BUILDING. THEIR GIFT OF THE SANCTUARY TO THE HHS ENABLED THE CREATION OF THE NYQUIST-HARCOURT WILDLIFE SANCTUARY.
127	TOWN ORGANIZED	Historic marker for site where Lloyd was organized	(no agency or date)	439 New Paltz Road, Highland, NY 12528	Lloyd	41°44′04.88″N 74°00′11.88″W	TOWN ORGANIZED FIRST OWN OF LLOYD MEETING; HELD HERE MAY 6, 1845. LLOYD TOWNSHIP SET OFF; FROM TOWN OF NEW PALTZ. TOWN POP. 1845 WAS 2035.
128	YELVERTON HOUSE	Historic marker for the Yelverton House	(no agency or date)	39 Maple Ave, Highland, NY 12528	Lloyd	41°43′02.53″N 73°57′03.97″W	YELVERTON HOUSE 1754 HISTORIC SITE ON STATE; AND NATIONAL REGISTERS. SAWMILL, BRICK YARD AND; STORE. SLAVES SCULLED HIS; FERRY ACROSS HUDSON.
129	DEWITT HOUSE	Historic marker for the DeWitt House	State Ed Dept, 1939	7800 US 209, Napanoch, NY 12458	Napanoch	41°44′16.26″N 74°22′40.11″W	DEWITT HOUSE THIS HOUSE IS ON ORIGINAL; CELLAR OF HOME OF EGBERT de WITT, WHOSE DAUGHTER MARIA; WAS MOTHER OF de WITT CLINTON; FIRST GOVERNOR OF NEW YORK.
130	OLD SCHOOL BAPTIST MEETING HOUSE	Historic marker for the Old Baptist Meeting House	Historical Society of Olive (no date)	Route 28 and Reservoir Road	Shokan	41°58′24.05″N 74°12′44.07″W	CHURCH ORGANIZED IN 1799; AS THE TONGOR BAPTIST; CHURCH OF CHRIST. PRESENT; EDIFICE ERECTED IN 1857.
131	SHOKAN REFORMED	Historic marker for the Shokan Reformed Church	Historical Society of Olive (no date)	Route 28 and Church St.	Shokan	41°58′22.77″N 74°13′20.87″W	CHURCH ORGANIZED IN 1799; ORIGINAL SITE NOW BELOW; ASHOKAN RESERVOIR; PRESENT EDIFICE DEDICATED; ON SEPTEMBER 14, 1913.
132	1779; FORT SHANDAKEN	Historic marker for Fort Shandaken	Shandaken Historic Site (no date)	Route 28 across from Hudler Cemetery	Mt. Tremper	42°01′59.31″N 74°16′30.47″W	DURING THE REVOLUTIONARY WAR, A LOG FORT STOOD NEAR; THIS SPOT TO DEFEND; KINGSTON FROM ENEMY ATTACK
133	OLIVEBRIDGE	Historic marker for the church	(no agency or date)	Route 213 south of Route 28A	Olivebridge	41°55′49.7058″N 74°12′58.6584″W	OLIVEBRIDGE UNITED METHODIST CHURCH; CONGREGATION FORMED CIRCA; 1810, BUILDING ERECTED 1823; REBUILT 1867, AFTER A FIRE. WE WELCOME YOU TO ATTEND!
134	DUTCH CHURCH - 1827	Historic marker for this Dutch church	Klyne Esopus Historical Society Museum (no date)	9W / Broadway in Ulster Park	Esopus, in its hamlet of Ulster Park	41°51′13.5″N 73°58′09.89″W	DUTCH CHURCH - 1827 KLYNE ESOPUS & EAST NEW PALTZ; REFORMED DUTCH CHURCH; 1791–1965. MOTHER CHURCH OF ST. REMY, PORT EWEN & UNION CENTER CONGREGATIONS.
135	SOJOURNER TRUTH	Historic marker for a site of Sojourner Truth's enslavement	William C. Pomeroy Foundation 2013	Broadway and River Road in Ulster Park	Esopus, in its hamlet of Ulster Park	41°54′00.55″N 73°58′27.22″W	SOJOURNER TRUTH 1797 - 1883; A SLAVE HERE AT MARTINUS; SCHRYVER'S TAVERN: 1808–1810. SPEAKER - ACTIVIST ON ABOLITION, WOMEN'S RIGHTS & TEMPERANCE.
136	VICTORY IN 1777	the marker	Cahill School Grade 4 1997	School Road and Old King's Road	Saugerties	42°08′30.8″N 73°57′12.9″W	VICTORY IN 1777 TRADITION TELLS US THAT TROOPS; FROM THE BATTLE OF SARATOGA; WERE GREETED HERE, FEASTED, AND ESCORTED DOWN THE KING'S; ROAD BY JOYOUS TOWNSPEOPLE.
137	PERSEN STORE SITE	NY State historic marker for the Persen Store Site	State Ed Dept, 1936	Route 32 and Route 34 in Katsbaan hamlet of Saugerties	Saugerties	42°06′34.1″N 73°58′05.2″W	PERSEN STORE SITE 23 YARDS EAST STOOD STORE; OF CORNELIUS PERSEN; ALSO; FUR TRADE HEADQUARTERS OF; JOHN JACOB ASTOR; IN 1867; USED AS A PLACE OF WORSHIP
138	PHOENICIA STATION	NY State historic marker at the station	National Register of Historic Places (no date but likely 1999)	Phoenicia	Shandaken's hamlet Phoenicia	42°04′49.9″N 74°18′30″W	PHOENICIA STATION CENTENNIAL; ULSTER AND DELAWARE RR; 1899-1999
139	GLASSWORKS SITE	Historic marker for the glassworks site	Hudson Valley Bottle Club (no date)	West corner of Canal St and Edwards Pl in Ellenville	Wawarsing	41°42′51.5″N 74°23′18.9″W	GLASSWORKS SITE ELLENVILLE GLASS CO. 1836-96; PRODUCED BOTTLES, DEMIJOHNS, FRUIT JARS & INSULATORS ON; A LARGE SCALE EMPLOYING UP; TO FOUR HUNDRED HANDS.
140	NEW HURLEY REFORMED CHURCH	marker for the church	Town of Plattekill 1990	208 and New Hurley Road	Wallkill	41°38′18″N 74°08′37.9″W	☨ HISTORICAL SITE NEW HURLEY REFORMED CHURCH; FOUNDED NOV 9, 1770; REBUILT 1835
141	NEW PROSPECT	a picture of the marker, in the dark, with a cemetery sign behind it	(no agency or date)	Pirog Road, N of Route 52	Pine Bush	41°37′05.7″N 74°18′59.3″W	NEW PROSPECT ORIGINALLY PECONASINK SETTLEMENT; DUBOIS AND SCHOONMAKER; GRANTED 1749. ORIGINAL NEW PROSPECT; DUTCH REFORMED CHURCH BUILT 1815; NEW CHURCH BUILT 1856
142	WALKER VALLEY	a picture of the marker, in the dark, with sunflowers	Town of Shawangunk (no date)	Route 52 at Marl Road	Shawangunk	41°37′56.7″N 74°22′28″W	WALKER VALLEY ORIGINALLY NAMED JAMESBURGH; RENAMED WALKER VALLEY-1862; HOME TO DELAWARE INDIANS; UNTIL THE LATE 1700'S [sic] DUTCH SETTLEMENT IN MID 1700'S [sic]
143	LOCUST LAWN	the marker and the house	Huguenot Historical Society (no date)	436 State Route 32 South, Wallkill, NY 12589	Wallkill	41°41′49.6″N 74°06′06.4″W	LOCUST LAWN BUILT FOR COLONEL JOSIAH HASBROUCK; IN 1814. THIS FEDERAL STYLE RESIDENCE; WAS DESIGNED BY LOCAL ARCHITECT; CROMWELL OF NEWBURCH, N.Y.
144	GRIST MILL 1762	Historic marker for the mill	(no agency or date)	Mill Dam Road, Marbletown, NY	Marbletown	41°51′44.3″N 74°08′28.11″W	GRIST MILL 1762 LEONARD HARDENBERGH BUILT; THIS MILL AND RESIDENCE IN; 1762, THE MILL PROVIDED; FLOUR FOR THE ARMY DURING; THE AMERICAN REVOLUTION
145	SOJOURNER TRUTH	the marker	New York State (no date but during Pataki administration 1995–2006)	Route 213 in Rifton	Esopus	41°50′59.3″N 74°02′09.1″W	SOJOURNER TRUTH 1797? - 1883 BORN INTO; SLAVERY IN SWARTEKILL, THEN; HURLEY, SHE ROSE TO BECOME; A FAMOUS ORATOR AND; CHAMPION OF HUMAN RIGHTS.
146	WALK TO FREEDOM	the marker	William C. Pomeroy Foundation 2015 (marker is numbered 231)	Floyd Ackert Road west of 9W in Esopus	Esopus	41°47′46.8″N 73°57′42.9″W	WALK TO FREEDOM IN OCTOBER 1826 SOJOURNER TRUTH WALKED THIS ROAD FROM WEST PARK TO RIFTON LEAVING SLAVERY BEHIND FOR A LIFE OF FREEDOM
147	JENKINSTOWN	the marker	(no agency or date)	Jenkinstown Road, Gardiner	Gardiner	41°41′49.8″N 74°06′29.8″W	JENKINSTOWN JENKINS-DUBOIS FARM & MILL; PART OF 1688 LOUIS DUBOIS PATENT; LAMBERT JENKINS EST. MILLS & BUILT STONE HOUSE IN 1793; DUBOIS-JENKINS FAMILY STILL; RESIDES ON THE FARM
148	BRUYNSWICK	the marker	Town of Shawangunk (no date)	Hoagerburgh and Bruynswick Roads, Shawangunk	Shawangunk	41°39′28.3″N 74°13′34.1″W	BRUYNSWICK NAMES FOR SETTLER GERTRUYD BRUYN. HER 1682 DEED PURCHASING; LAND FROM THE INDIANS; CONTAINS THE EARLIEST USE OF; THE NAME "SAWANKONCK" (SHAWANGUNK)
149	BRUYNSWICK SCHOOL	the marker	National Register of Historic Places (no date)	Brunyswick Road, north of Hoagerburg Road, Shawangunk	Shawangunk	41°39′34.3″N 74°13′32.8″W	BRUYNSWICK SCHOOL DISTRICT NO. 8 BUILT C. 1840 THIS NEW SCHOOL; HOUSE REPLACED THE OLD SCHOOL; WHICH STOOD ONE-FOURTH MILE NORTH; THE SCHOOL CLOSED 1943 SERVING AS A PLACE OF LEARNING FOR 100 YEARS.
150	REFORMED CHURCH OF SHAWANGUNK	the marker	National Register of Historic Places (no date)	Hoagerburgh Road, Shawangunk	Shawangunk	41°39′13.5″N 74°12′49.9″W	REFORMED CHURCH OF SHAWANGUNK PARSONAGE BUILT 1751; CHURCH BUILT 1752-55; OLDEST CHURCH STILL IN USE; AMONG REFORMED CHURCH; CONGREGATIONS IN AMERICA
151	THE FOUR CORNERS	NY State historic marker for the Four Corners	William C Pomeroy Foundation, 2018 (#552)	Corner of Crown and John Streets, Kingston, New York	Kingston, New York	41°56′01.1″N 74°01′15.4″W	THE FOUR CORNERS; ALL FOUR STONE HOUSES AT THIS INTERSECTION BUILT BETWEEN CA. 1663 - CA. 1775. PRIOR TO THE REVOLUTIONARY WAR.
152	POPPLETOWN HOUSE	NY State historic marker for the Poppletown House	(no agency or date)	Jct. of Old Post Rd. and Swarte Kill Rd., Esopus, New York	Esopus, New York	41°49′16.79″N 73°58′29.76″W	POPPLETOWN HOUSE A STONE FARM HOUSE TYPICAL OF; HOUSES BUILT IN ULSTER COUNTY, NY DURING THE LATE 18TH AND; EARLY 19TH CENTURIES. AN HISTORIC SITE.
153	The Senate House	the marker	State of NY Educ. Dept and NYS Thruway Authority, 1965	Ulster Travel Plaza, US Interstate 87 southbound, north of Kingston, NY	Ulster	42°00′51.22″N 73°59′58.46″W	Historic New York: The Senate House, 1676, Clinton Avenue, Kingston
154	Kingston Area	the marker	State of NY Educ. Dept and NYS Thruway Authority, 1965	Ulster Travel Plaza, US Interstate 87 southbound, north of Kingston, NY	Ulster	42°00′50.76″N 73°59′58.65″W	Historic New York: Kingston Area
155	Hudson Valley	NY State historic marker for the Hudson Valley	State of NY Educ. Dept and NYS Thruway Authority, 1965	undeveloped Malden travel plaza, US Interstate 87 southbound, north of Saugerties	Saugerties	42°06′25.03″N 73°57′33.33″W	Historic New York: Hudson Valley
156	SOJOURNER TRUTH	NYS Historical Marker commemorating Sojourner Truth	Colonel Hasbrouck House	Green Street between John and Crown, Kingston, NY	Kingston, New York	41.9321797°N 74.021501°W	SOJOURNER TRUTH LIVED HERE IN 1828 WHEN SHE FOUGHT TO FREE HER ENSLAVED SON, BECOMING THE 1ST BLACK WOMAN IN US HISTORY TO SUE A SLAVEHOLDER—AND WIN. COLONEL HASBROUCK HOUSE - 2022
157	Dubois House	NY State Historical marker for (another) DuBois House	State Ed Dept, 1935	Springtown Road, New Paltz, NY	New Paltz, NY	41°48′26.5″N 74°04′54.8″W	DUBOIS HOUSE BUILT IN 1755 BY BENJAMIN DUBOIS, GRANDSON OF ISAAC DUBOIS, NEW PALTZ PATENTEE.

This list does not include the satirical markers in Ulster County erected by artist Norm Magnusson to resemble official Historic Markers. Such markers are distinguished by official Markers by displaying a map of the continental United States with the words "UNITED STATES" above the map at the top of the sign (official Markers in Ulster County usually display a map of New York State (sometimes with the map placed in between the words "NEW" and "YORK") and at the bottom, displaying the words "EDUCATION DEPARTMENT", aping the "STATE EDUCATION DEPARTMENT" that erects the official Markers. Magnusson's satirical markers further distinguish themselves from official Markers by placing the words "ON THIS SITE STOOD" on the same part of, and the same size as, the part of the sign where the name of the event/place/person(s) that the official Marker commemorates is placed. Magnusson's markers do not represent actual historical events, places or people but are intended to make a political point on issues that Magnusson feels need to be discussed and addressed. For example, in Woodstock, Magnusson erected a marker (at the coordinates 42°02′26.0″N 74°07′10.4″W) "commemorating" a fictitious Patriot called "Rob't Hass" that reads "ON THIS SITE STOOD AMERICAN PATRIOT ROB'T HASS WHO BELIEVED THAT A HEALTHY DEMOCRACY MUST DISCOURAGE APATHY AND RESPECT DISSENT. EDUCATION DEPARTMENT, 2006".

== See also ==
- List of New York State Historic Markers
- National Register of Historic Places listings in Ulster County, New York
- National Register of Historic Places listings in New York
- List of National Historic Landmarks in New York
- Historical Marker Database for Ulster County
