= Johannes Jansen =

Johannes Jansen may refer to:

- Johannes Henricus Gerardus Jansen (1868–1936), archbishop of Utrecht and Roman Catholic Primate of the Netherlands
- Johannes Jansen (mayor), mayor of New York, 1725–1726
- Johannes J.G. Jansen (1942–2015), scholar of contemporary Islam in the Netherlands
- Johannes Janssen (1829–1891), German historian

== See also ==
- Hans Jansen (disambiguation)
- Johannes Jansen House, Shawangunk, New York
