= Pearl Street Schoolhouse =

- U.S. National Register of Historic Places
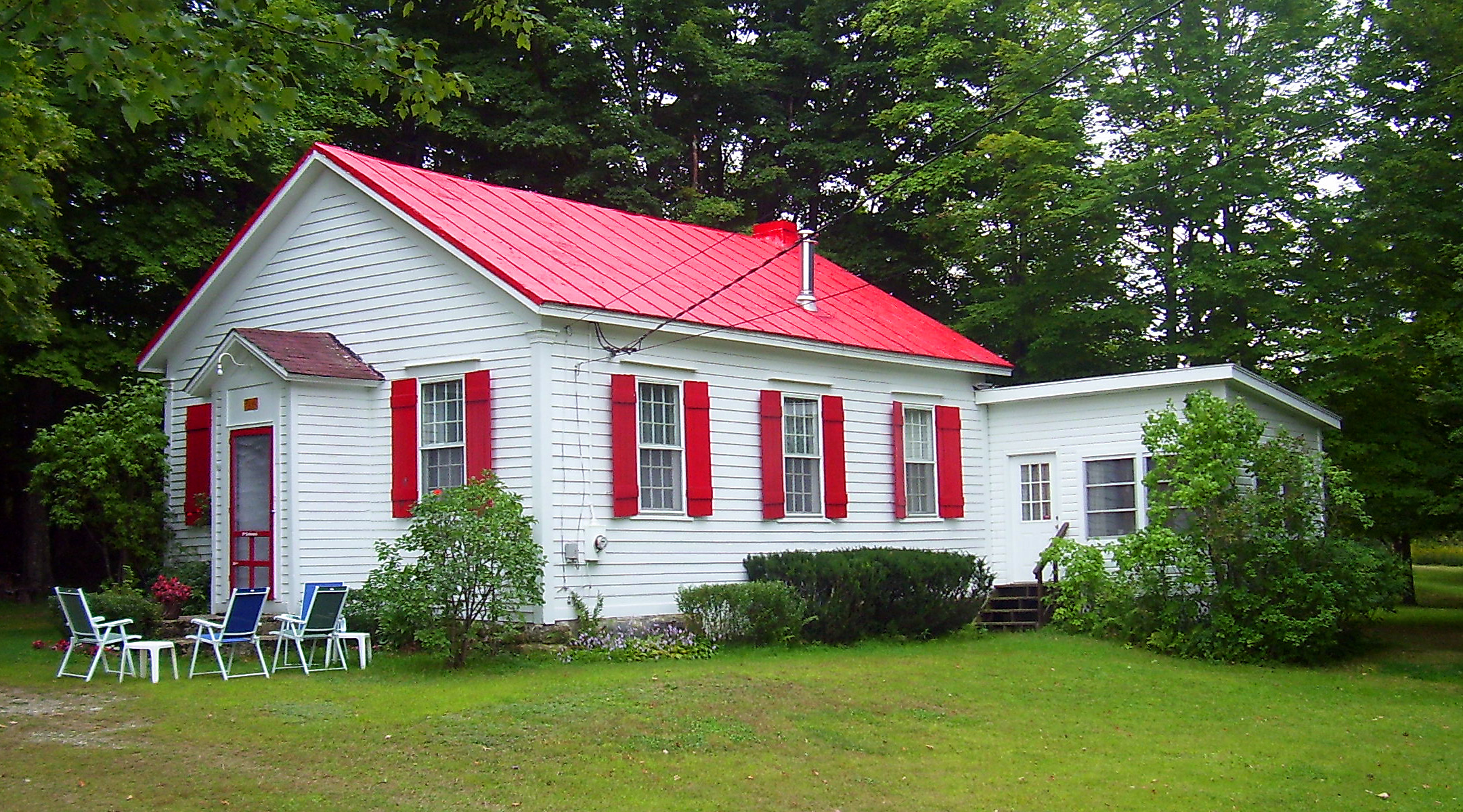
- Front (north) elevation and east profile, 2007
- Location: Shawangunk, NY
- Coordinates: 41°39′22″N 74°16′36″W
- Area: 1.5 acres (6,100 m^{2})
- Built: ca. 1850
- MPS: Shawangunk Valley MRA
- NRHP reference No.: 83001820
- Added to NRHP: September 26, 1983

The Pearl Street Schoolhouse, also known as District 11 Schoolhouse, is located south of the junction of Awosting and Decker roads in the Town of Shawangunk, New York, United States. It was built around 1850.

The schoolhouse name is derived from the tendency of the Jansen family to speak often of Pearl Street in what is today Lower Manhattan. The homes of early settlers Thomas and Johannes are within a mile (1.6 km) of each other. Eventually, the whole area they lived in became known as Pearl Street.

The building, now a private home, was added to the National Register of Historic Places in 1983. It is a single-story three-by-three-bay frame structure on a stone foundation, now parged with concrete. A gabled roof is pierced by a brick chimney. To the west a modern shed-roofed wing on block piers projects.

Inside, the single room has been divided into two large spaces. Much of the original woodwork, including the wainscoting, remains. Other signs of the building's use as a school are evident, particularly the coat pegs near the south door, a black spot on the floor where the potbelly stove was and a hole in the wall for its exhaust pipe.

The first record of the building is an 1858 atlas describing the building as a store with the school across the street; however this is believed to be in error because of the building's architecture. In 1875 another atlas describes it as Public School No. 11. It remained in use as a school until 1942-43, after which it was sold for use as a private residence. In 1956 the rear wing was added, and it was expanded nine years later, adding two more rooms to the house.

== See also ==
- Bruynswick School No. 8, another former schoolhouse nearby listed on the Register
- National Register of Historic Places listings in Ulster County, New York
