= Rochester, New York (disambiguation) =

Rochester, New York, is a city in New York, United States.

Rochester, New York, may refer to:

- Rochester metropolitan area, New York, the metropolitan area centered on Rochester
- Rochester, Ulster County, New York, a town in New York, United States
- Rochester New York FC, a soccer club
