= Krom Stone House at 31 Upper Whitfield Road =

Historic house in New York, United States

- U.S. National Register of Historic Places
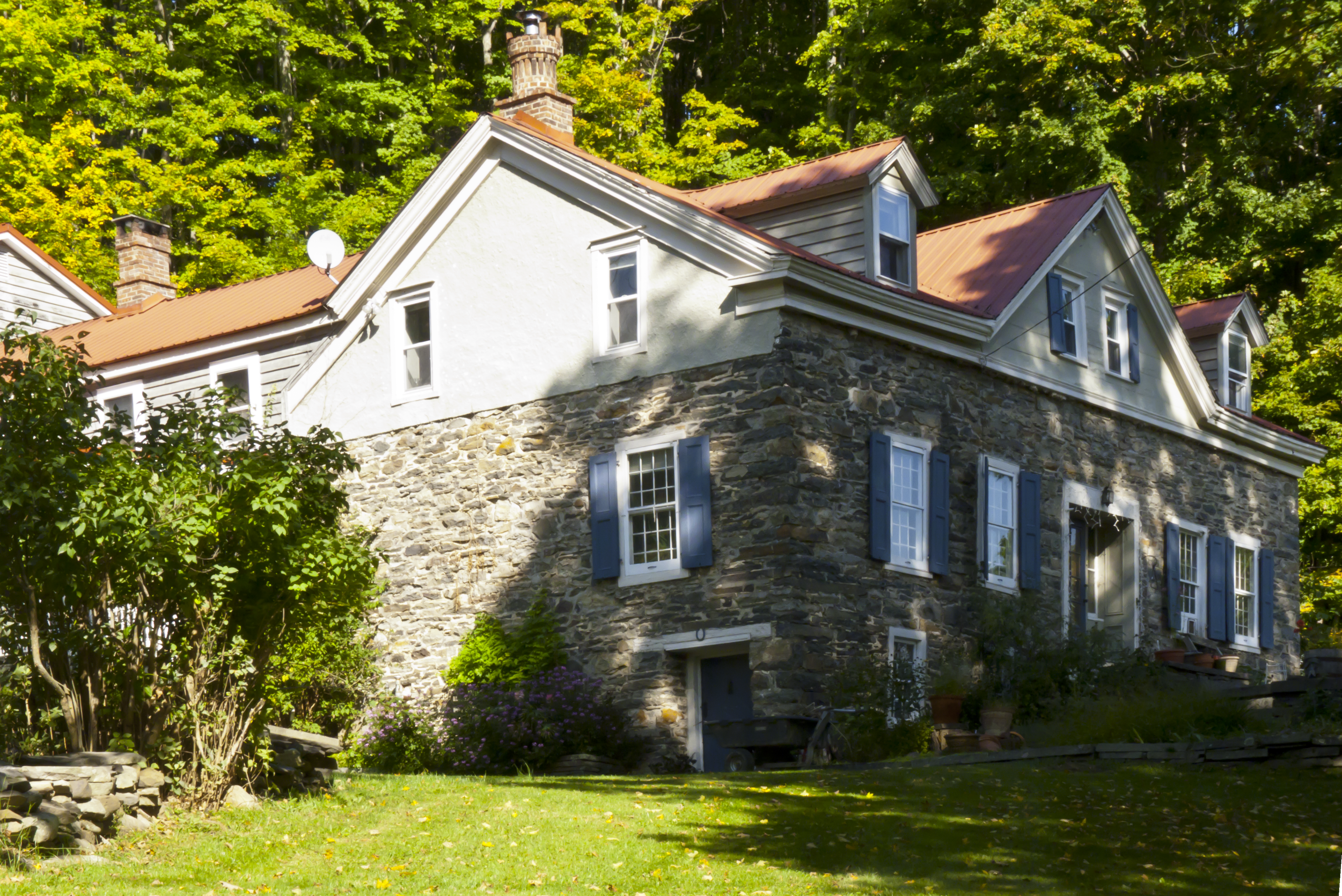
- Krom Stone House at 31 Upper Whitfield Road, September 2012

- Location within New York Location within the United States
- Location: 31 Upper Whitfield Rd., Rochester, New York
- Coordinates: 41°49′43″N 74°13′39″W
- Area: 7 acres (2.8 ha)
- Built: 1764
- MPS: Rochester MPS
- NRHP reference No.: 95000954
- Added to NRHP: August 10, 1995

Krom Stone House at 31 Upper Whitfield Road is a historic home located at Rochester in Ulster County, New York. It is a 1 1/2-story stone dwelling in a linear plan built about 1764. At the rear is a four-bay, 2-story frame ell dating to about 1879.

It was listed on the National Register of Historic Places in 1995.
