= Hans Jansen (disambiguation) =

Hans Jansen (1942–2015) was a Dutch politician, scholar of contemporary Islam and author.

Hans Jansen may also refer to:

- Hans Martens, sometimes given the name Hans Jansen, father of Dutch spectacle-maker Zacharias Jansen
- Hans Jansen, a developer who submitted code related to the XZ Utils backdoor

== See also ==
- Johannes Jansen (disambiguation) (Hans is often short for Johannes)
