= Zena, New York =

- CDP
- Location in Ulster County and the state of New York.
- Coordinates: 42°1′20″N 74°5′9″W
- Country: United States
- State: New York
- County: Ulster

Area
  - Total: 3.09 sq mi (8.01 km^{2})
  - Land: 3.06 sq mi (7.92 km^{2})
  - Water: 0.035 sq mi (0.09 km^{2})
- Elevation: 377 ft (115 m)

Population (2020)
  - Total: 1,038
  - Density: 339.5/sq mi (131.08/km^{2})
- Time zone: UTC-5 (EST)
  - Summer (DST): UTC-4 (EDT)
- FIPS code: 36-84187
- GNIS feature ID: 0971869

Zena is a hamlet (and census-designated place) in Ulster County, New York, United States. As of the 2020 census the population was 1,038.

Zena is in the Town of Woodstock on County Route 30. The community is northwest of Kingston. Zena is one of the more wealthy areas of this region, with the average home value above $300,000.

== Geography ==
Zena is located at 42°1′20″N 74°5′9″W (42.022311, -74.085908).

According to the United States Census Bureau, the CDP has a total area of 3.0 square miles (7.8 km^{2}), all land.

Zena is bordered on the west by Morey Hill Rd, extends north through Zena Highwoods Rd until Church Rd., also north halfway up John Joy Rd. It extends north on Zena Rd, almost all the way to State Route 212. On the northern end, it also includes the southern half of Chestnut Hill Rd and most of Witchtree Rd.

== Demographics ==
Historical population
Census	Pop.	Note	%±
2000	1,119		—
2010	1,031		−7.9%
2020	1,038		0.7%
U.S. Decennial Census

As of the census of 2000, there were 1,119 people, 447 households, and 320 families residing in the CDP. The population density was 379.8 inhabitants per square mile (146.6/km^{2}). There were 501 housing units at an average density of 170.0 per square mile (65.6/km^{2}). The racial makeup of the CDP was 94.37% White, 1.79% African American, 0.09% Native American, 1.97% Asian, 0.09% Pacific Islander, 0.71% from other races, and 0.98% from two or more races. Hispanic or Latino of any race were 1.52% of the population.

There were 447 households, out of which 28.4% had children under the age of 18 living with them, 60.0% were married couples living together, 8.7% had a female householder with no husband present, and 28.2% were non-families. 21.5% of all households were made up of individuals, and 7.6% had someone living alone who was 65 years of age or older. The average household size was 2.49 and the average family size was 2.93.

In the CDP, the population was spread out, with 22.9% under the age of 18, 3.6% from 18 to 24, 22.8% from 25 to 44, 32.9% from 45 to 64, and 17.9% who were 65 years of age or older. The median age was 45 years. For every 100 females, there were 87.4 males. For every 100 females age 18 and over, there were 90.1 males.

The median income for a household in the CDP was $62,566, and the median income for a family was $80,945. Males had a median income of $48,523 versus $39,500 for females. The per capita income for the CDP was $32,084. About 3.3% of families and 5.9% of the population were below the poverty line, including 10.4% of those under age 18 and 1.5% of those age 65 or over.

== Education ==
The school district for most of the CDP is Kingston City School District. A portion of the CDP is in Onteora Central School District. The comprehensive high school of the Kingston City district is Kingston High School.
