= Tillson, New York =

- CDP
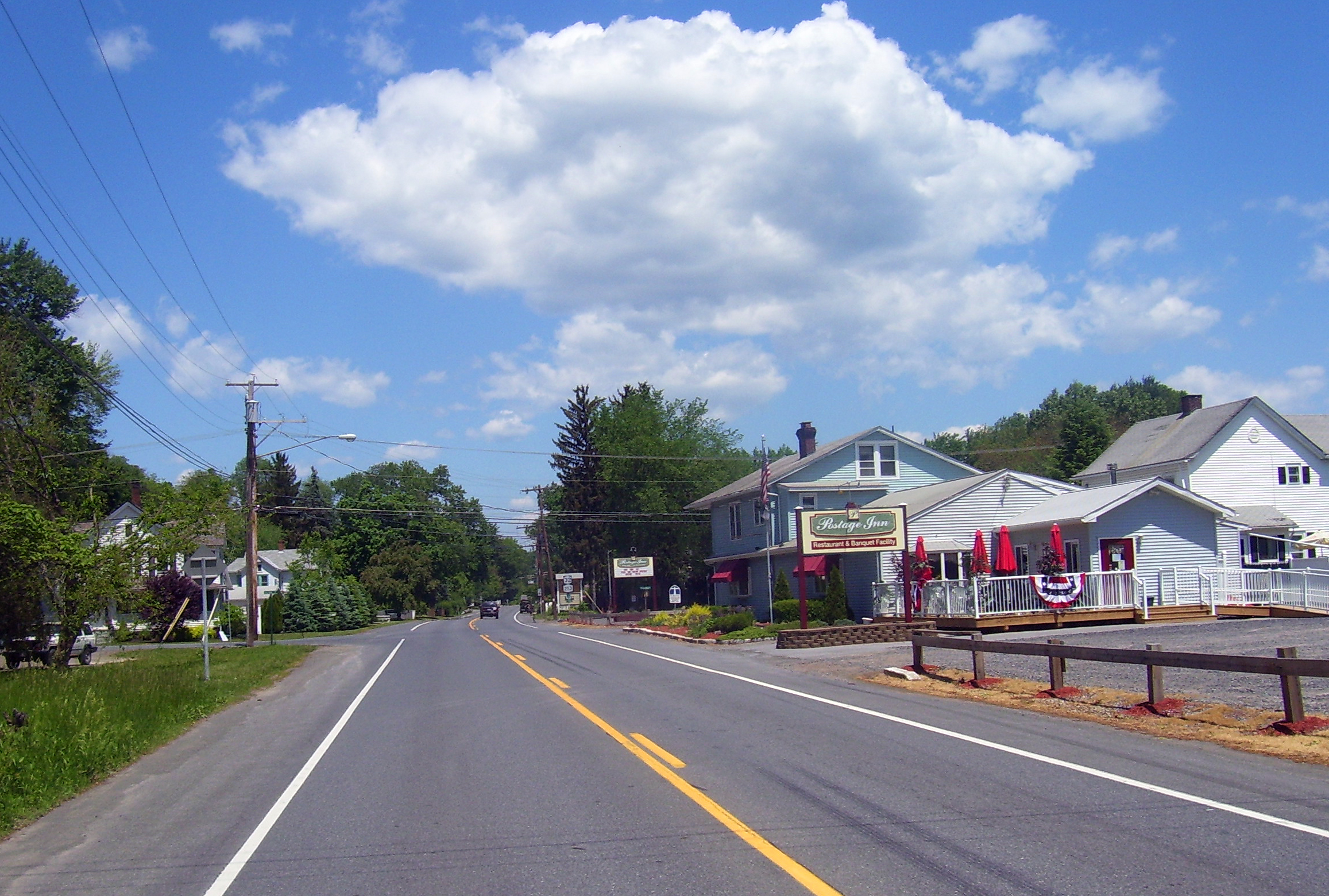
- Tillson, looking north along the main highway

- Location in Ulster County and the state of New York.
- Coordinates: 41°49′52″N 74°4′19″W
- Country: United States
- State: New York
- County: Ulster

Area
  - Total: 2.37 sq mi (6.14 km^{2})
  - Land: 2.34 sq mi (6.07 km^{2})
  - Water: 0.023 sq mi (0.06 km^{2})
- Elevation: 233 ft (71 m)

Population (2020)
  - Total: 1,516
  - Density: 646.5/sq mi (249.61/km^{2})
- Time zone: UTC-5 (EST)
  - Summer (DST): UTC-4 (EDT)
- ZIP code: 12486
- Area code: 845
- FIPS code: 36-73902
- GNIS feature ID: 0967526

Tillson is a hamlet (and census-designated place) in Ulster County, New York, United States. The population was 1,516 at the 2020 census.

Tillson is in the Town of Rosendale, along routes 32 and 213.

== Geography ==
Tillson is located at 41°49′52″N 74°4′19″W (41.831082, -74.072072).

According to the United States Census Bureau, the CDP has a total area of 2.3 square miles (6.0 km^{2}), of which 2.3 square miles (6.0 km^{2}) is land and 0.04 square miles (0.10 km^{2}) (1.28%) is water.

== Demographics ==
Historical population
Census	Pop.	Note	%±
2000	1,709		—
2010	1,586		−7.2%
2020	1,516		−4.4%
U.S. Decennial Census

As of the census of 2000, there were 1,709 people, 629 households, and 452 families residing in the CDP. The population density was 738.4 inhabitants per square mile (285.1/km^{2}). There were 676 housing units at an average density of 292.1 per square mile (112.8/km^{2}). The racial makeup of the CDP was 96.96% White, 1.05% African American, 0.29% Native American, 0.23% Asian, 0.06% from other races, and 1.40% from two or more races. Hispanic or Latino of any race were 1.93% of the population.

There were 629 households, out of which 37.4% had children under the age of 18 living with them, 58.7% were married couples living together, 9.5% had a female householder with no husband present, and 28.0% were non-families. 20.0% of all households were made up of individuals, and 8.7% had someone living alone who was 65 years of age or older. The average household size was 2.72 and the average family size was 3.16.

In the CDP, the population was spread out, with 28.8% under the age of 18, 5.4% from 18 to 24, 33.0% from 25 to 44, 21.2% from 45 to 64, and 11.6% who were 65 years of age or older. The median age was 36 years. For every 100 females, there were 95.5 males. For every 100 females age 18 and over, there were 91.4 males.

The median income for a household in the CDP was $47,083, and the median income for a family was $51,375. Males had a median income of $38,696 versus $27,298 for females. The per capita income for the CDP was $19,413. About 7.1% of families and 14.5% of the population were below the poverty line, including 26.6% of those under age 18 and 6.3% of those age 65 or over.

== Education ==
The school district for most of the CDP is Kingston City School District.. A small portion is in Rondout Valley Central School District. The comprehensive high school of the Kingston City district is Kingston High School.
