= Poppletown Farmhouse =

Historic house in New York, United States

- U.S. National Register of Historic Places
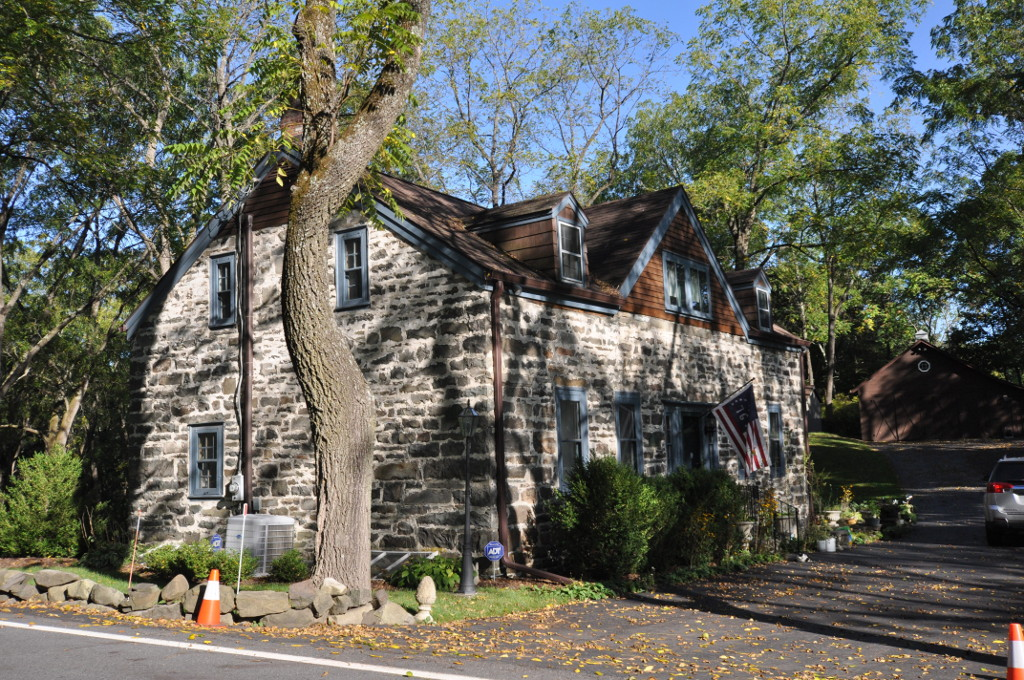

- Location within New York Location within the United States
- Location: Jct. of Old Post Rd. and Swarte Kill Rd., Esopus, New York
- Coordinates: 41°49′16″N 73°58′31″W
- Area: 4.4 acres (1.8 ha)
- Built: 1800
- Architectural style: Federal
- NRHP reference No.: 91001656
- Added to NRHP: November 7, 1991

Poppletown Farmhouse is a historic home located at Esopus in Ulster County, New York. It is a compact, two story rectangular stone house with a side facing gable roof built about 1800.

It was listed on the National Register of Historic Places in 1991.
