= Bruynswick School No. 8 =

Historic 1840 schoolhouse in Bruynswick, New York

- U.S. National Register of Historic Places
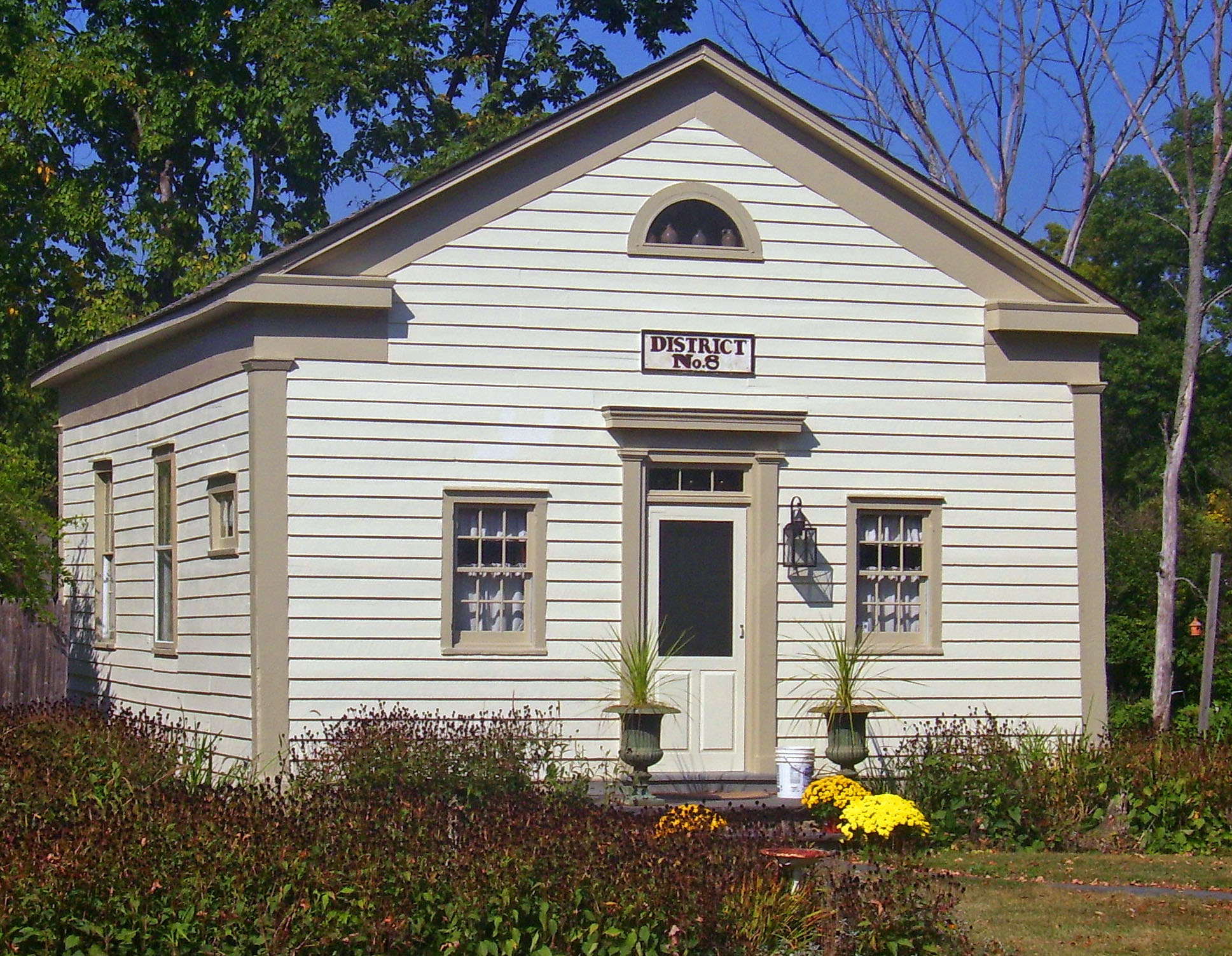
- School building in 2007
- Location: Town of Shawangunk, New York
- Nearest city: Middletown
- Coordinates: 41°39′33″N 74°13′35″W
- Built: 1840
- Architectural style: Greek Revival
- NRHP reference No.: 00001277
- Added to NRHP: 2000

Bruynswick School No. 8 is a former school located on Bruynswick Road (Ulster County Route 7) in the small hamlet of the same name in the northwestern portion of Shawangunk, New York, United States. It is one of the few remainders of a time when Bruynswick was more populous.

The building is on a small lot next to the Shawangunk Valley firehouse on the west side of the road, just south of the Gardiner town line. The Shawangunk Ridge dominates the view to the west across mostly open rural land. It is a frame one-room schoolhouse, three bays by three and one story in height. It sits on a stone foundation with a gabled roof shingled in asphalt.

The front facade faces east and features a centrally located entrance amid simple wooden surrounds and a lunette in the gable apex. The windows on either side have louvered shutters. A wood plaque above the door has "District No. 8" painted on it. Both north and south profiles have two similarly shuttered windows; with an additional, smaller third on the south with an awning. The rear is blank with the exception of a small shed addition.

Inside, much of the original floor plan and finishes remain. A bedroom has been created in the southeast corner, and a second-story loft added. The shed serves as a bathroom and utility room. A garage and privy are also located on the property; these are of modern construction and not considered contributing resources.

The schoolhouse was built in 1840 to replace an older school a quarter-mile (400 m) to the south. It continued to be used as a school until 1943, when the Wallkill Central School District was created. Some modifications, such as the front lunette, were made in the 1950s to convert it into a private home. In 2000 it was added to the National Register of Historic Places.

== See also ==
- Gardiner Town Hall, former schoolhouse in neighboring Gardiner on the Register.
- Pearl Street Schoolhouse, another former school in the town on the National Register.
- National Register of Historic Places listings in Ulster County, New York
