= New Hurley Reformed Church =

Historic church in New York, United States

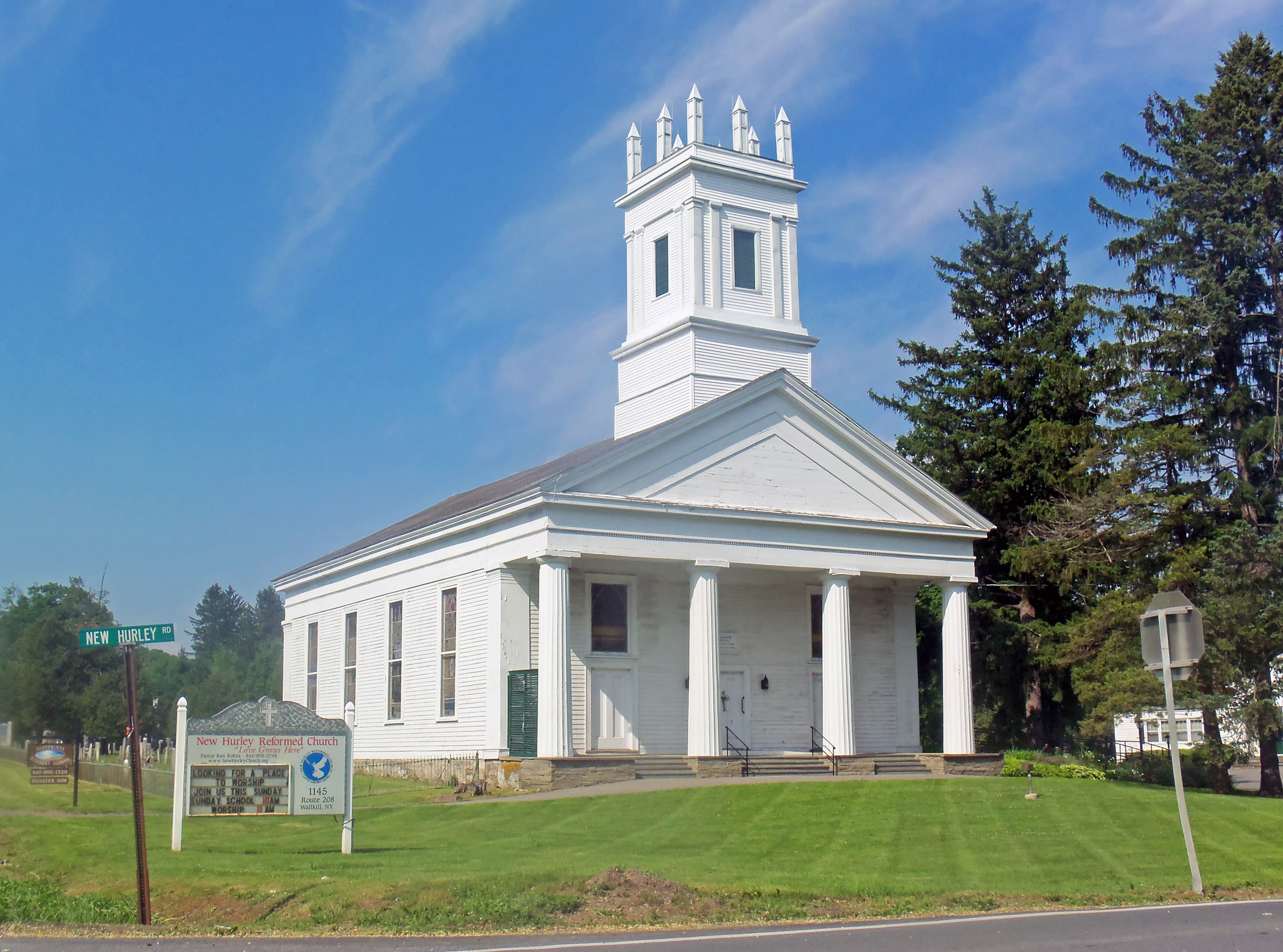
- West profile and south (front) elevation, 2013

- Location within New York

Religion
- Affiliation: Reformed Church in America
- Leadership: The Rev. Ken Kobza
- Year consecrated: 1835

Location
- Location: Wallkill, NY, US
- Coordinates: 41.63817°N 74.14375°W

Architecture
- Style: Greek Revival
- Completed: 1835

Specifications
- Direction of façade: South
- Length: 80 feet (24 m)
- Width: 50 feet (15 m)
- Materials: Wood, stone, brick

U.S. National Register of Historic Places
- Added to NRHP: November 10, 1982
- NRHP Reference no.: 82001273

Website
- New Hurley Reformed Church

The New Hurley Reformed Church, listed on the National Register of Historic Places (NRHP) as the Reformed Dutch Church of New Hurley, is located on New York State Route 208 roughly 3 miles (4.8 km) north of the hamlet of Wallkill, New York, United States, midway between it and Gardiner to the north, in the town of Plattekill. It is a wooden structure built in the Greek Revival style during the 1830s. In 1982 it was listed on the NRHP.

The church was established in the late 18th century, shortly before the Revolutionary War, when a flood on the nearby Wallkill River washed out a bridge that Dutch settlers in the area had used to reach services at another nearby Dutch Reformed Church. After several years, they were granted permission to establish a new church on the condition it was located away from the river. The site was purchased several years afterwards, and a primitive church built on the spot, with a parsonage and cemetery added later. For its first half-century it shared a pastor with another Reformed church in New Paltz.

It was replaced by the current building in 1835. While the Greek Revival style was used for many American churches at the time, the New Hurley church's implementation is unusually large, and visibly restrained in its use of decoration, per the austere style favored by the Reformed Church. Its front columns were created by laying brick in a circular pattern and then plastering over them to create the fluting on the exposed points.

In the early 20th century the current stained glass windows were installed; during the 1920s the aging building was renovated after a period in which church membership had declined to the point that a vote had to be taken to save it from closure. A second renovation, in the middle of the century, focused on the interior; around the same time a new church hall was built on the property to replace one that had been located a short distance away. Further work was done on the interior in the 1970s.

== Building and grounds ==
The church is located on the east side of New York State Route 208, in the northeast corner of the three-way intersection with New Hurley Road (Ulster County Route 20). It is three miles (4.8 km) north of the hamlet of Wallkill and roughly the same distance south of Gardiner, the next hamlet to the north; it is almost a thousand feet south of the boundary of the town of that name. The church is in the westernmost corner of the town of Plattekill; neighboring Shawangunk, where the church's Wallkill ZIP Code is based, is on the south and west across the two roads.

The surrounding area is primarily rural in character, with a mix of woodlots, orchards and open fields. The terrain is gently rolling, mostly level on the east side of the church but descending slowly towards the Wallkill River, two miles (3.2 km) to the west in that direction. On the south side of New Hurley are two residences on large lots with mostly wooded area to their south; another large woodlot is on the west side of Route 208. To the east is the Catskill Aqueduct, part of New York City's water supply system. Around 2,000 feet (610 m) to the southwest along the highway is the combined property of Shawangunk and Wallkill state prisons.

In addition to the church, the property includes a cemetery, the oldest portion of which is included along with it in the one-acre (4,000 m^{2}) portion listed on the National Register, since it has many intact gravestones of locally prominent church members from the early 19th century. It fills out most of the property to the north and northeast, ending just short of the aqueduct. On the east side of the church is an asphalt parking lot, with the parsonage and church hall on its east.

=== Exterior ===
The church building itself is a rectangular wooden structure, four bays by three, 50 by 80 feet (15 by 24 m), on a stone foundation. It is sided in clapboard and topped by a front-gabled roof pierced by a square bell tower near the south elevation; a brick chimney is to its northeast. A paved driveway runs across the south (front) elevation from Route 208 to the parking lot; a lengthy inclined sidewalk flanked by metal guardrails connects the front portico with the parking lot near the handicapped spaces, to provide accessibility. Mature Norway spruces on the east and southeast shade the building in that direction. A metal fence anchored to the building on both sides near the front delineates the church's cemetery.

Three sets of steps, the central one with metal handrails, cut in the bluestone porch provide access to the portico on the south elevation. Four round fluted Doric columns support a projecting pediment with a tympanum faced in flushboard. On the facade behind the colonnade, the curtain wall has two wide smooth square pilasters at either corner. A wooden wall is at the west end of the porch.

In between the pilasters are three wide entrances. The main entrance, in the center, is flanked with two iron lamps. Above it is a wooden plaque with "R.D. Church of New Hurley, founded 1770, rebuilt 1835" on it; the other two are topped with windows of equal size.

Both sides have four evenly spaced tall and narrow windows. A pair of bulkhead doors to the cellar is located on the east side near the south corner. On the rear there are two near the corners. The roofline is set off by two wide molded friezes divided by a narrow dentilled course and topped by a raking cornice, a treatment that continues into the broken pediment on the rear. Below the eaves on the front pediment are two plain linear nested molded friezes.

The roof is sheathed in wooden shingles. The bell tower has five stages, all faced in narrow clapboard. The first ends in a narrow molded cornice; the second, slightly smaller, ends in a much larger cornice. Above it the taller third stage has a louvered rectangular vent on each side, flanked by pilasters with a larger pilaster at each corner, all topped with mutules ending on a molded course. The fourth stage, above that, is another short clapboarded section ending in a projecting cornice, above which a short clapboarded parapet, the final stage, rises. It is topped by eight pluicles.

=== Interior ===
All three entrances, set with paneled doors, open into a narrow vestibule. They in turn open into the sanctuary, corresponding to three aisles between and aside the wooden pews, each with mahogany back rails and arm rests. At the rear of the church is a lectern on a raised platform. Behind it is an entablature screen supported by four fluted pilasters, flanked by the rear windows.

Pilasters flank all eight side windows, rising to a broad, flat cornice at the ceiling. In the space between the cornice and window sash are five wooden bosses. The space is illuminated by chandeliers hung from the ceiling. Staircases at opposite ends of the front vestibule lead up to the organ and choir where a trap door permits access to the bell tower. In the basement is a furnace.

== History ==
The church owes its establishment to the accident of a flood along the Wallkill River denying settlers in the area easy access to what had up till then been their church. For its first half-century it shared a pastor with yet another nearby church. The current building, erected in 1835, has been in continuous use ever since.

=== 1628–1766: Establishment of the Dutch Reformed Church in the Hudson Valley ===
Dutch colonists brought the Dutch Reformed Church with them to New Netherland when they began settling the Hudson Valley in the early 17th century. The first Reformed church in the colony was established in New Amsterdam (today's New York City) in 1628; the colony's capital Fort Orange (now Albany) followed in 1642.

Over the course of the century, even after the Dutch ceded the colony to Britain after the Esopus Wars, settlers and their descendants ventured out of their original communities in search of arable land in the valley. They brought the Reformed Church with them, establishing today's Old Dutch Church in Kingston in 1660 and another in what is now New Paltz in 1717. Two decades later, settlement had reached the valley of the Wallkill River and its major tributary the Shawangunk Kill below the eponymous ridge, where the towns of Shawangunk and Gardiner are today, south of New Paltz.

In those early days, the settlers had kept their faith by gathering in their houses. After more years had passed and the population became larger, this was no longer feasible, and in 1753 the Reformed Church of Shawangunk was chartered. Its church in the nearby hamlet of Bruynswick, also listed on the National Register, is the oldest building in continuous use by what is now the Reformed Church in America.

=== 1767–1774: Establishment of the New Hurley church ===
At that time, the farmers in the New Hurley area were able to reach the church by means of a bridge across the Wallkill. In September 1767, a flood washed that bridge away, greatly inconveniencing those members of the congregation who lived east of the river. They appealed to the church's consistory to let them build a new church they could reach, but were rejected out of concern that a new church so close to the existing one would deprive it of members and resources, and urged the petitioners to be "patiently content with the present divine arrangement."

Two years of the arrangement did not make them any more patient. They appealed to the consistory again in 1769, but received no reply. So instead they went up to the classis which governed the area's Reformed churches. After some deliberation, a committee appointed by the classis concluded that "the aforesaid community [should] in a friendly manner be permitted to accomplish their desire to be constituted into a church." However, to avoid the potential diversion of resources from the existing Bruynswick church, the classis required that the new church be located some distance away from the Wallkill.

A majority vote of the putative congregants chose the present site for the church, as yet unbuilt. The congregation was formally established in late 1770. Three years later, the church bought the land the current structure stands on and began building the first church, using the timber felled in clearing the property to build a plain 30-by-40-foot (9.1 by 12.2 m) wooden structure. The building had no heat of its own—members brought their own foot stoves to keep warm during winter services.

=== 1774–1828: Shared pastors with New Paltz ===
In those earliest years, the church had no pastor, laving with sporadic, mostly nonexistent records. That changed in 1775, when it agreed to share a pastor with the Reformed Church in New Paltz. The arrangement worked well enough that the two churches pooled their resources to build a parsonage three years later.

The pastor, Stephen Goetschius, had given his services in Dutch as he spoke little English. But by the end of the 18th century, English was beginning to displace Dutch as the native language of the younger residents of Dutch descent. Whether to hold services in English was a subject of much discussion in the Dutch Reformed Church of the Hudson Valley, and the New Paltz and New Hurley churches had to consider this issue as well when they sought a new pastor in the later 1790s. They hired the bilingual J.H. Meyer, who gave his sermons in Dutch first and then English every other Sunday, as the churches had decided, for the three years he held the position.

In 1811 a 20-foot (6.1 m) extension was added to the rear of the church. It thus became one of the few churches wider than it was long. The following year, the new section was nearly burned down when a celebration of Oliver Hazard Perry's victory over Britain's Royal Navy in the Battle of Lake Erie during the War of 1812 became overzealous.

Six years later, William Bogardus came to serve as pastor of both churches. He would be the last to serve in this dual capacity, taking leave of New Hurley to become New Paltz's pastor exclusively in 1828. The following year F.H. Vanderveer became the first full-time pastor at New Hurley.

=== 1829–1848: New buildings ===
During Vanderveer's tenure, the church would totally revamp its facilities. Before his arrival it had already purchased the land for a new parsonage; soon after he took office it was actually built. The major task, however, was the construction of a new church, the current structure.

By the early 1830s the population in the New Hurley had grown, testing the limits of even the expanded structure. At the same time, that original church, now almost 60 years old, had begun to deteriorate. Accordingly, it was demolished to make way for a new church, built on the same foundation, in 1835.

The new church, whose architect is unknown, was a larger wooden structure built in the popular Greek Revival architectural style, complete with a front colonnade. Those columns were built in an unusual manner. First, bricks were laid in a circular pattern, their projecting points corresponding to those in the fluting planned for the columns. After they had set, they were plastered over.

Even within the conventions of the Greek Revival, very popular at that time, the church is distinctive. Its proportions and scale are unusually large for the temple-style variant, muted somewhat by the use of narrow clapboard siding instead of the flushboard more commonly used at the time. Also, in keeping with the minimalist aesthetic of the Reformed Church, it uses far less ornament than was otherwise common on contemporary Protestant churches in the style.

At that time there was also a row of sheds along the east wall exterior. These were primarily meant for members to stable their horses during services, but they also served to house the occasional church bazaars. On the building's inside, the organ and choir were located at the front of the sanctuary rather than the rear, as is the tradition in the Reformed Church.

=== 1849–1926: Prosperity and decline ===
Church growth continued with the new facilities. Vanderveer had long been succeeded by two other pastors when, in 1848, the church reported to the classis that it had increased its membership by 85 people since that time. In 1854 L.L. Comfort took over as pastor; he would oversee the church during the difficult Civil War years. Afterwards, in 1870, he composed a hymn to mark the church's centennial.

Comfort retired due to health problems the next year. Eight different pastors would preside over the church in the next half-century. Many members got wealthier as the country itself did during the Gilded Age; this was reflected in the stained glass windows purchased for the church and installed in 1905–06. One, on the east side of the north facade, was based on Heinrich Hofmann's Christ Knocking at the Door.

But this increase in affluence was accompanied by a decline in membership, as people became more materially satisfied. Churches closed around the country. When New Hurley's pastor resigned in 1922, no one was called to replace him as the members were too few. This situation persisted for the next four years.

=== 1927–present: Renewal and reconstruction ===
The classis summoned the remaining members of the church to a meeting and asked them if they wanted to close the church or not. Unanimously, they voted to continue, and hired a new pastor, Arthur van Arendonk. He revitalized the church's ministry, and oversaw the first serious renovations to the building, now almost a century old.

On the outside, the church was repainted and the steeple repaired. Inside, the church was wired for electricity and a new baptismal font installed. Both the property and the building were formally conveyed to the church. A building four miles (6.4 km) from the church, at what is today the intersection of New York State Route 300 and Plains Road (Ulster County Route 20), was put into use as a church hall.

Van Aredonk died in 1932, but the church's renewal survived. His replacement, a younger man named Vernon Negal, added a weekday Bible study group and a Daily Vocation Bible School. He also bought new hymnals, and most significantly led the project to build a new parsonage on the site of the old one, whose wood fueled heating system was no longer efficient or effective.

Negal left in 1939. His successor, John Tysse, would stay through 1955. He continued to expand the church's programming outside of services, coordinating massive donations to the War Emergency Fund and instituting a Good Cheer Committee to help the sick and grieving in the Wallkill area. New Hurley joined with six other Reformed churches in the area to start the Wallkill Valley Union Lenten Series; which continues to meet today after Lent services, making it the oldest such continuous series in the history of the Reformed Church.

Under Tysse the church and its members continued their improvements to the church's physical plant. The congregation had outgrown the church hall after only 20 years; it was sold and a new one, complete with a full-size gym and industrial cooking facilities, constructed by the end of Tysse's tenure. Between the two new buildings and the church, the old horse sheds were finally torn down and a parking lot built on their location, acknowledging that congregants now traveled to the church by automobile. Within the church itself the cellar was excavated so that a modern furnace could replace the old wood stoves that had up till then provided heat in wintertime.

When the church's bicentennial came in 1970, another new pastor, D. Reardon, came to New Hurley. His project would be further renovations to the interior. Most significantly, the organ and choir were finally moved from the front of the sanctuary to the rear upstairs, bringing them into line with Reformed Church tradition. The pews were removed and repainted, the floor was refinished and a new ceiling was installed.

== Services and programs ==
"We seek to be an honest and faithful Christ-centered Biblical group of people," the church says in its mission statement. "We have committed ourselves to joyfully and obediently offer praise to God." To that end its members aim to create "an accepting environment for people on their [s]piritual journey towards a greater commitment to Jesus Christ." Sunday school, for children 4 and up with another class for interested adults, and regular services are held every Sunday morning, with a coffee hour afterwards.

For more advanced adults, a Bible study group is held midweek on evenings. Also during the week, Footprints, a morning day care program, is held. Local Alcoholics Anonymous meetings are held on Tuesday and Thursday evenings, with a women-only session on Fridays.

== See also ==
- National Register of Historic Places listings in Ulster County, New York
