= Reformed Church of Shawangunk =

Historic church in New York, United States

- U.S. National Register of Historic Places
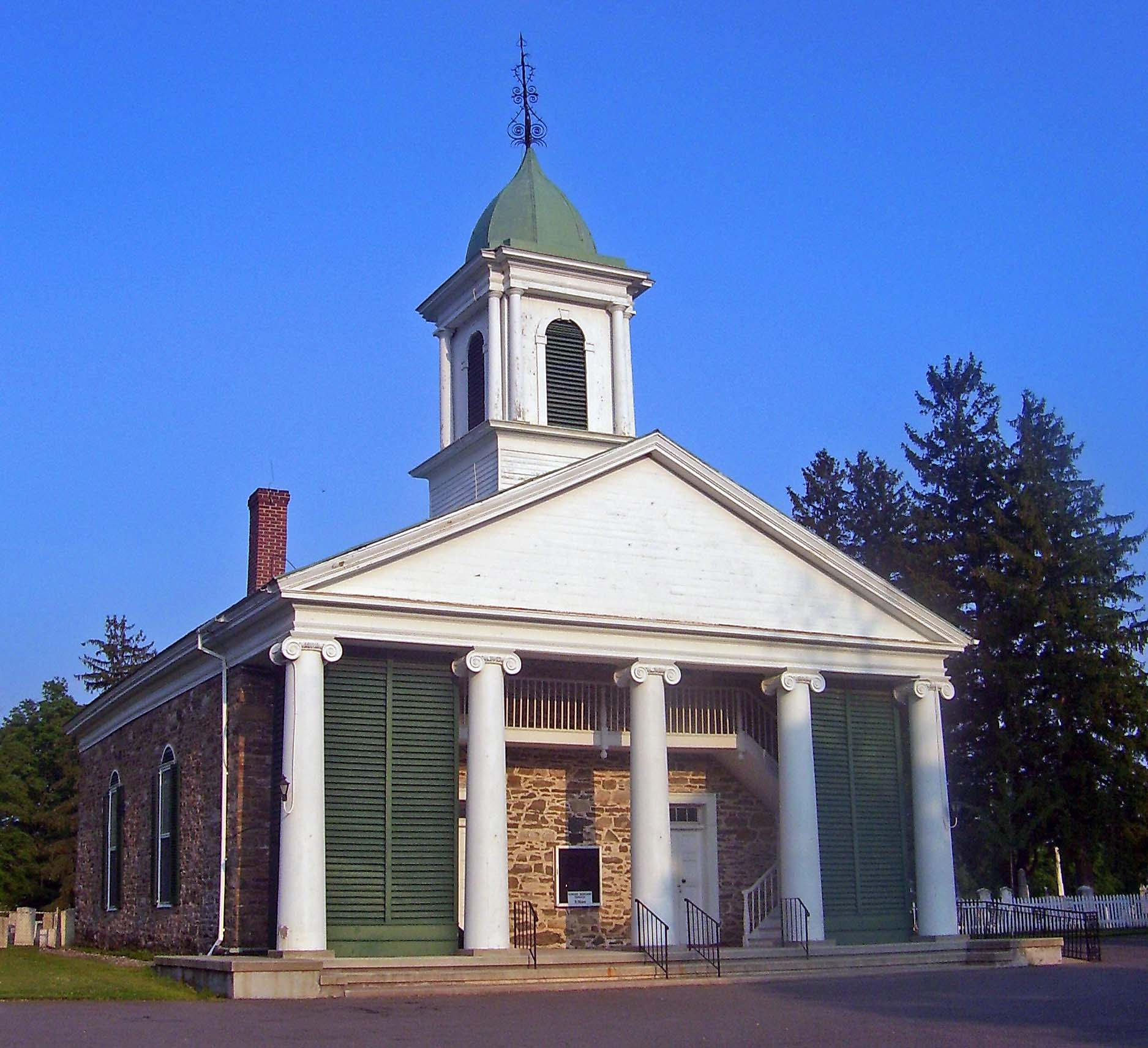
- Main church building in 2007

- Location within New York Location within the United States
- Location: Town of Shawangunk, NY
- Nearest city: Newburgh
- Coordinates: 41°39′17″N 74°13′04″W
- Area: 4 acres (1.6 ha)
- Built: 1755. Greek Revival Portico added in 1833.
- Architectural style: Greek Revival
- NRHP reference No.: 82003408
- Added to NRHP: 3 June 1982

The Reformed Church of Shawangunk is located along Hoagerburgh Road in the Bruynswick section of the Town of Shawangunk, Ulster County, New York, United States. Perched above the Shawangunk Kill, it enjoys a splendid view of the nearby Shawangunk Ridge. Built between 1752–55, it is the oldest building in continuous use among American congregations of the Dutch Reformed Church.

It is on the National Register of Historic Places, and has played a role in the development of the larger Reformed Church in the U.S. through some church leaders who began their careers there.

== History ==
There has been a congregation in the area since 1736, when five baptisms were recorded. The Dutch, German and Huguenot settlers of the region went to Kingston to handle their religious affairs, but eventually the local population grew large enough that they desired a church closer to home. So, in 1751, Isaac Hasbrouck bought six acres (2.4 ha) on which to build a church.

After the current parsonage across the road was built, construction began on the church itself the following year when subscribers put up the money in return for pews. Legend has it the workers had to first put up wooden stockades to fend off hostile Indian attacks. The adjacent Bruynswick Rural Cemetery, no longer owned by the congregation, saw its first burials that year, and the congregation was formally organized in 1753, with the Rev. Barent Vrooman serving as the first pastor. He left after a year to be replaced by Johannes Goetschius in 1760.

On 26 December 1755, the pews were sold and the completed church formally opened. Goetschius served until his death in 1771 and was buried in the church, beneath what was then the pulpit. The building underwent its first serious renovations in the late 1790s, when the interior was rotated. The west windows became the doors and the pulpit was moved to the east wall, followed by a corresponding change in the orientation of the pews, and the parsonage's second story completed.

In 1833–34 the five front columns were added, in the then-popular Greek Revival style, to protect the doors. The original south entrance was finally sealed in 1881.

A third building, a church hall to the west, was added to the church complex in 1916. It received a wing for modern kitchen and bathroom functions in 1958, and another one to meet space needs in 1990. In 1982 the building was listed on the National Register as "Reformed Church of Shawangunk Complex", reflecting the historic importance of all the buildings and the cemetery.

== Legacy ==
Five other local Dutch Reformed Church congregations have been split off from the Shawangunk Reformed Church: New Hurley, New Prospect, Guilford, Wallkill and Gardiner. The New Hurley church is also on the National Register.

Two former pastors of the church have become President of the Reformed Church in America: Ryniew Van Nest in the late 18th century and Charles Scott a century later. Scott left Shawangunk to accept a professorship at Hope College in Holland, Michigan; he would eventually serve as church president from 1881-92. He is buried in the church's cemetery.

John Van Vleck, a former congregant who became a minister himself, helped establish Hope's forerunner, Holland Academy. Van Vleck Hall on campus is named for him. Abraham Wilson, another former pastor, left to fill the same position for the Reformed Church in Fairfield, Illinois, the church's first congregation in what was then known as the West, in 1837.

At least 143 men from the congregation fought in the Revolutionary War. Of those, 43 are buried in the cemetery.
