= Alligerville Historic District =

Historic district in New York, United States

- U.S. National Register of Historic Places
- U.S. Historic district
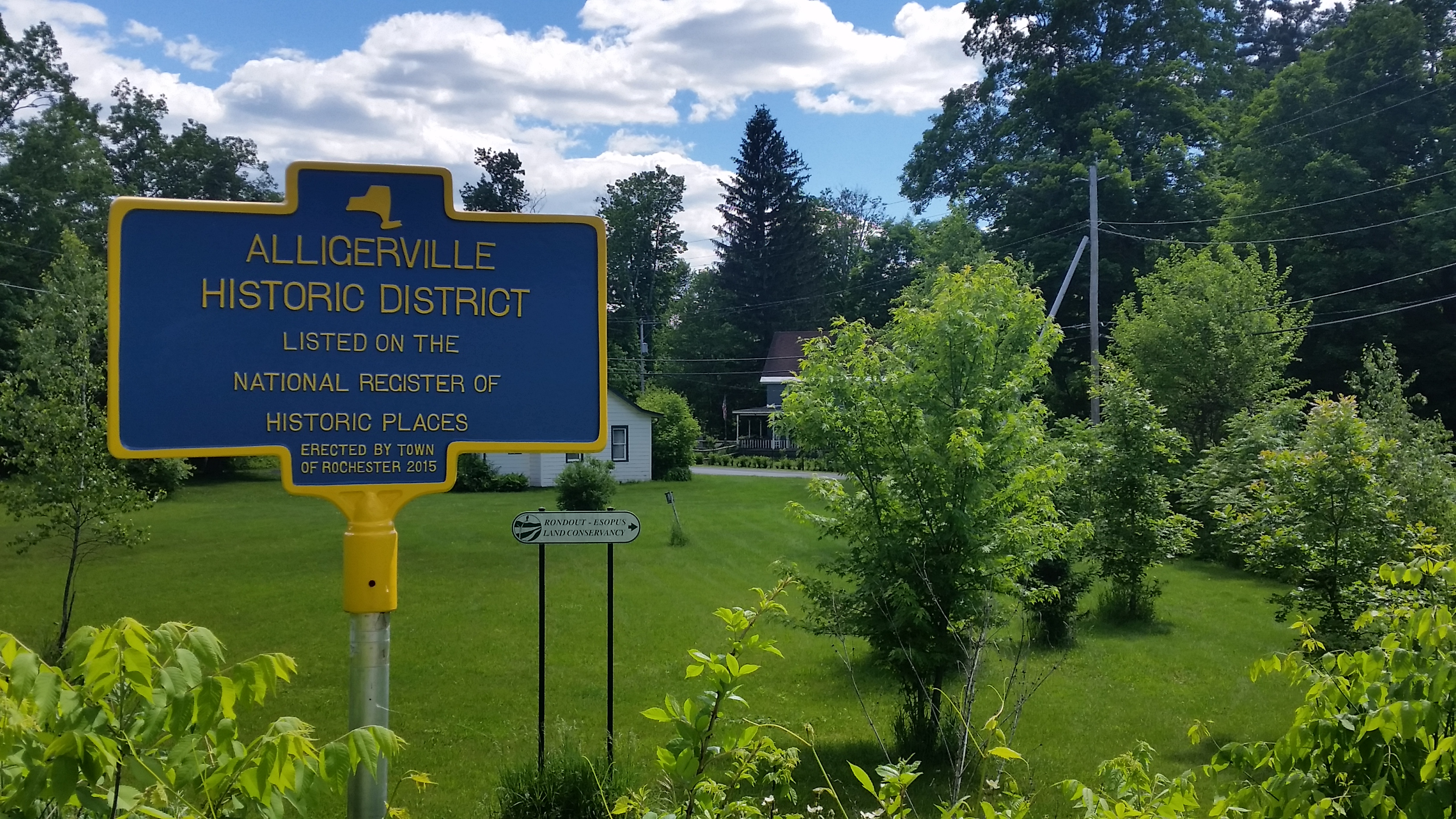
- NY State historical marker for Alligerville, NY

- Location within New York Location within the United States
- Location: Berme, Church Hill, Creek, Rose Hill & Towpath Rds., Cty. Rd. 6, Church & Purcell Lns., Alligerville, New York
- Coordinates: 41.7959°N 74.1789°W
- Area: 154.16 acres (62.39 ha)
- Built: c. 1828-1935
- Architectural style: Greek Revival, Gothic Revival, Italian Villa
- NRHP reference No.: 15000370
- Added to NRHP: June 30, 2015

Alligerville Historic District is a national historic district located at Alligerville, Ulster County, New York. It encompasses 81 contributing buildings, 5 contributing sites, and 8 contributing structures in the hamlet of Alligerville. It developed after 1828 around Lock 21 (originally Lock 22) on the Delaware and Hudson Canal and includes notable examples of Greek Revival, Gothic Revival, and Italian Villa architecture. Notable contributing resources include the John & Catrina Alliger House (c. 1828), Reformed Dutch Church of the Clove Chapel (c. 1858), Ira Brodhead House (c. 1851), John Forbes Hotel (c. 1868), Alligerville Post Office (c. 1920), Thomas S. Schoonmaker Farm (1830), Union Free District No. 1 School (1878, 1966), Canal Outbuilding (c. 1850), Hall-Latinville Summer Cottages (c. 1935), and Hall-Barrett Summer Cottage (c. 1935).

It was listed on the National Register of Historic Places in 2015.
