= Anthony Yelverton House =

Historic house in New York, United States

- U.S. National Register of Historic Places
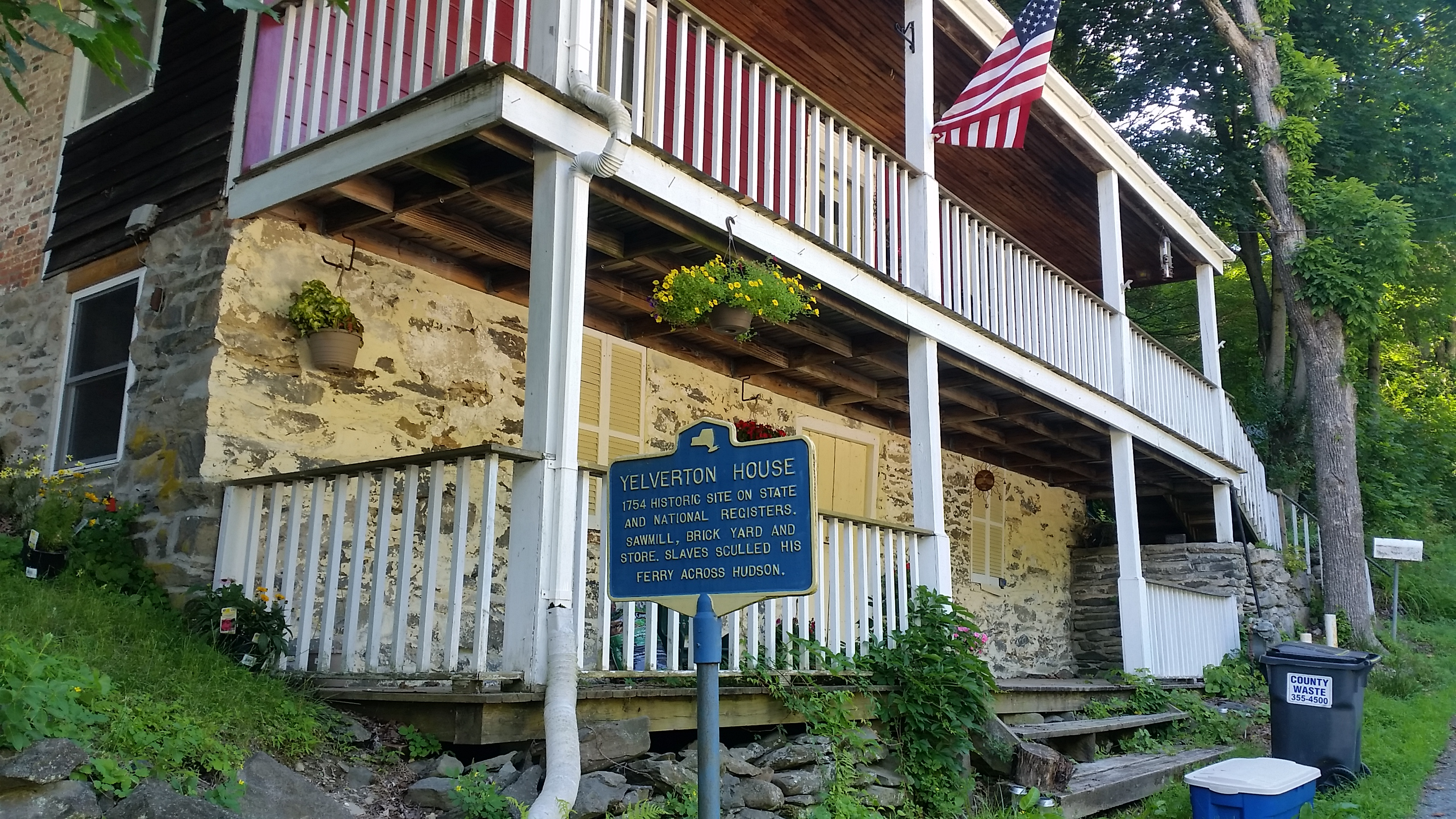
- The Yelverton House with its NYS Historical Marker, July 2017

- Location within New York Location within the United States
- Location: 39 Maple Ave., Highland, New York
- Coordinates: 41°43′1″N 73°57′5″W
- Area: less than one acre
- Built: c. 1754
- NRHP reference No.: 83001823
- Added to NRHP: September 22, 1983

The Anthony Yelverton House is a historic house located at 39 Maple Avenue Highland, Ulster County, New York.

== Description and history ==
It is a 1 1/2-story, three-bay wide frame structure built about 1754. It is built into the hillside. It features a two-story porch spanning the full width of the building. It is the only surviving structure from "Yelverton's Landing", and once served as a tavern, storehouse, and private residence.

Anthony Yelverton was a Poughkeepsie businessman. From this building and adjacent sawmill, Yelverton developed the area called both Yelverton's Landing and New Paltz Landing because a road connected it to New Paltz, further west. It became both a community in its own right and a Hudson River "port" for commerce from the New Paltz area.

It was listed on the National Register of Historic Places on September 22, 1983.
