= Johannes Jansen House =

Historic house in New York, United States

- Johannes Jansen House and Dutch Barn
- U.S. National Register of Historic Places
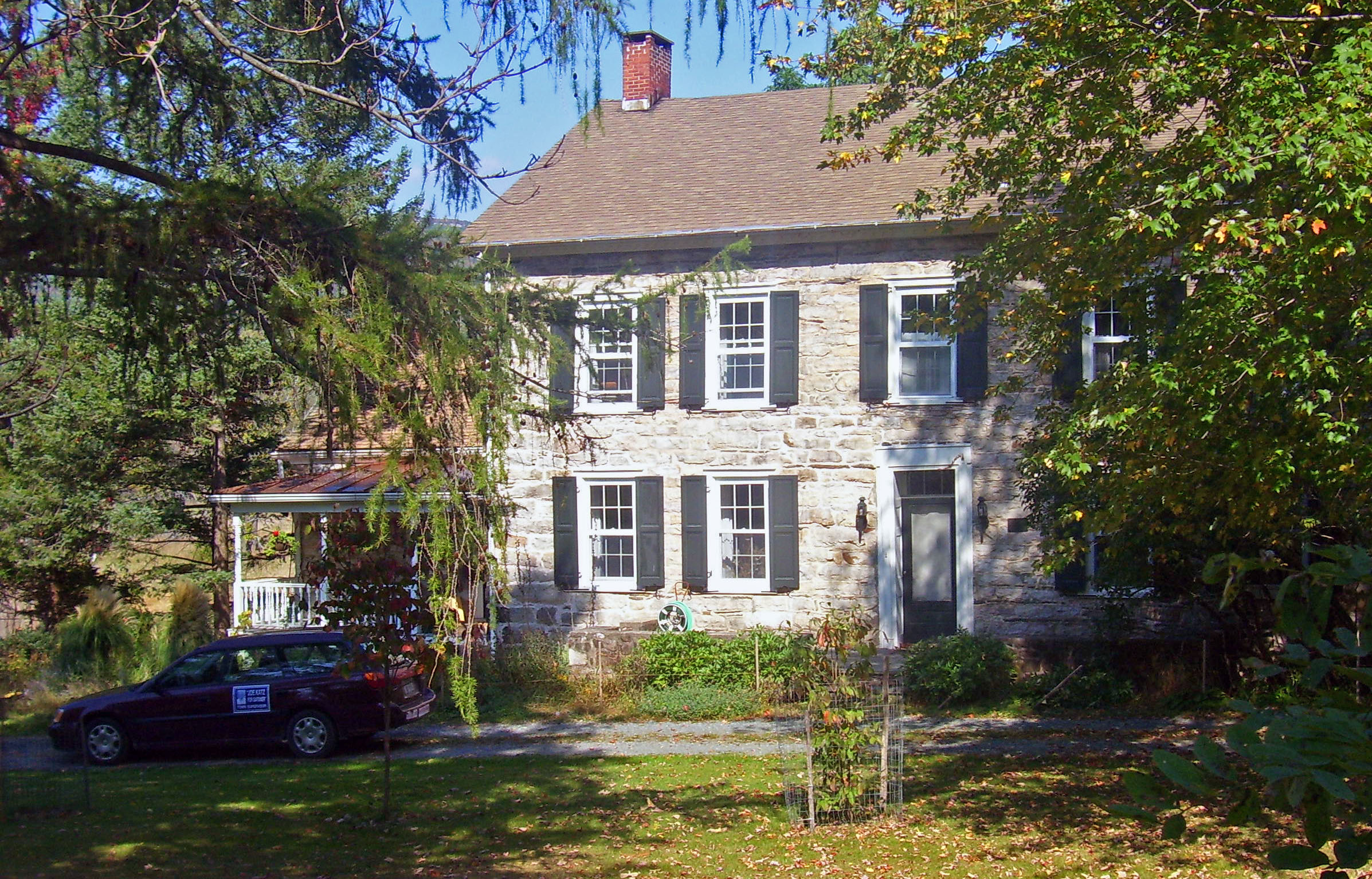
- House in 2007

- Location within New York Location within the United States
- Location: Decker Rd., Town of Shawangunk, NY
- Nearest city: Middletown
- Coordinates: 41°39′50″N 74°16′13″W
- Area: 40.5 acres (16.4 ha)
- Built: 1750
- Architectural style: Federal
- MPS: Shawangunk Valley MRA
- NRHP reference No.: 83001818
- Added to NRHP: September 26, 1983

The Johannes Jansen House, also known as Johannes Jansen House and Dutch Barn, is located along Decker Road at the foot of the Shawangunk Ridge in the western section of the Town of Shawangunk, in Ulster County, New York, United States. It was started by Jansen, who had settled the area along with his brother Thomas, whose own house is a mile (1.6 km) to the southeast, in 1750. His son finished it in the newer Federal style 53 years later. The property also boasts a Dutch barn.

It and the house were added to the National Register of Historic Places in 1983.
