= Rochester, Ulster County, New York =

Rochester
- Town
- Location in Ulster County and the state of New York.
- Coordinates: 41°48′13″N 74°15′48″W
- Country: United States
- State: New York
- County: Ulster
- Settled: 1672; 354 years ago
- Land patent: 1703; 323 years ago
- Town: 1788; 238 years ago
- Formal Town: 1803; 223 years ago

Area
  - Total: 88.8 sq mi (229.9 km^{2})
  - Land: 88.4 sq mi (229.0 km^{2})
  - Water: 0.39 sq mi (1.0 km^{2})
- Elevation: 535 ft (163 m)

Population (2020)
  - Total: 7,272
  - Density: 82.25/sq mi (31.76/km^{2})
- Time zone: UTC-5 (Eastern (EST))
  - Summer (DST): UTC-4 (EDT)
- FIPS code: 36-63011
- GNIS feature ID: 0979427
- Website: townofrochester.ny.gov

Rochester is a town in Ulster County, New York, United States. The population was 7,305 at the 2022 census. It is an interior town located near the center of Ulster County. The northwestern part of the town is in the Catskill Park.

U.S. Route 209 passes across the town.

== History ==
Mombaccus was the Dutch name for the area that became the town of Rochester. It was first settled by Europeans in 1672. The name Rochester began with the issuance of a land patent in 1703. It became a town in 1788, and the formal establishment of the town of Rochester occurred in 1803.

Parts of Rochester were used to create the towns of Middletown in 1798 (now in Delaware County), Neversink in 1798 (now in Sullivan County), Wawarsing in 1806, and Gardiner in 1853.

== Geography ==
According to the United States Census Bureau, the town has a total area of 88.8 square miles (230 km^{2}), of which 88.4 square miles (229 km^{2}) are land and 0.4 square miles (1.0 km^{2}) (0.42%) is covered by water.

Rochester lies in the foothills of the Catskill Mountains.

== Demographics ==
Historical population
| Census | Pop. | Note | %± |
|---|---|---|---|
| 1820 | 2,063 | | — |
| 1830 | 2,420 | | 17.3% |
| 1840 | 2,674 | | 10.5% |
| 1850 | 3,174 | | 18.7% |
| 1860 | 4,539 | | 43.0% |
| 1870 | 4,088 | | −9.9% |
| 1880 | 4,169 | | 2.0% |
| 1890 | 3,557 | | −14.7% |
| 1900 | 2,874 | | −19.2% |
| 1910 | 2,760 | | −4.0% |
| 1920 | 2,188 | | −20.7% |
| 1930 | 2,051 | | −6.3% |
| 1940 | 2,454 | | 19.6% |
| 1950 | 2,532 | | 3.2% |
| 1960 | 3,012 | | 19.0% |
| 1970 | 3,940 | | 30.8% |
| 1980 | 5,344 | | 35.6% |
| 1990 | 5,679 | | 6.3% |
| 2000 | 7,018 | | 23.6% |
| 2010 | 7,313 | | 4.2% |
| 2020 | 7,272 | | −0.6% |
U.S. Decennial Census 2020

As of the census of 2000, there were 7,018 people, 2,688 households, and 1,830 families residing in the town. The population density was 79.4 inhabitants per square mile (30.7/km^{2}). There were 3,750 housing units at an average density of 42.4 per square mile (16.4/km^{2}). The racial makeup of the town was 93.42% white, 2.51% African American, .54% Native American, .51% Asian, .04% Pacific Islander, .83% from other races, and 2.15% from two or more races. Hispanic or Latino of any race were 4.83% of the population.

There were 2,688 households, out of which 34.3% had children under the age of 18 living with them, 52% were married couples living together, 11.2% had a female householder with no husband present, and 31.9% were non-families. 24.7% of all households were made up of individuals, and 8.6% had someone living alone who was 65 years of age or older. The average household size was 2.58 and the average family size was 3.10.

In the town, the population was spread out, with 26.4% under the age of 18, 6.7% from 18 to 24, 30.3% from 25 to 44, 25.1% from 45 to 64, and 11.5% who were 65 years of age or older. The median age was 38 years. For every 100 females, there were 102.1 males. For every 100 females age 18 and over, there were 98.5 males.

The median income for a household in the town was $43,071, and the median income for a family was $47,257. Males had a median income of $36,250 versus $24,773 for females. The per capita income for the town was $21,065. About 8.2% of families and 10.9% of the population were below the poverty line, including 17.2% of those under age 18 and 7.2% of those age 65 or over.

== Communities and locations in Rochester ==
- Accord – a hamlet that is the seat of town government.
- Alligerville – a hamlet near the eastern town line. The Alligerville Historic District was listed on the National Register of Historic Places in 2015.
- Cherrytown – a hamlet northwest of Mombaccus.
- Fantinekill – a hamlet north of Kerhonkson and Pataukunk on Route 3.
- Granite – a hamlet south of Kerhonkson.
- Kerhonkson – a hamlet located at the western town line on US 209.
- Liebhart – a hamlet in the northern part of the town, east of Tabasco.
- Kyserike – a hamlet near the eastern town boundary, east of Alligerville.
- Mettacahonts – a hamlet north of Accord.
- Mill Hook – a hamlet northwest of Accord.
- Minniwaska – a hamlet near the southern town line.
- Minnewaska State Park – a state park partly in the southern section of Rochester.
- Mohonk Preserve – a nature preserve partially in the eastern part of the town. Part of Lake Mohonk is within the town also.
- Mombaccus – a hamlet north of Fantinekill on Route 3.
- Palentown – a hamlet in the northwestern part of the town, inside the Catskill State Park.
- Pataukunk – a hamlet north of Kerhonkson on Route 3.
- Pine Bush – a location on the western town line, north of Kerhonkson.
- Potterville – a hamlet by the town line in the northwestern part of the town, and inside the Catskill State Park.
- Riggsville – a hamlet in the northwestern part of the town, inside the Catskill State Park, southwest of Palentown.
- St. Joseph – a hamlet southeast of Accord.
- Tabasco – a hamlet in the northern part of the town on Route 3.
- Whitfield – a hamlet northeast of Accord.
- Yagerville – a location south of Potterville, located in the Catskill State Park.
