= Cragsmoor Historic District =

Historic district in New York, United States

- U.S. National Register of Historic Places
- U.S. Historic district
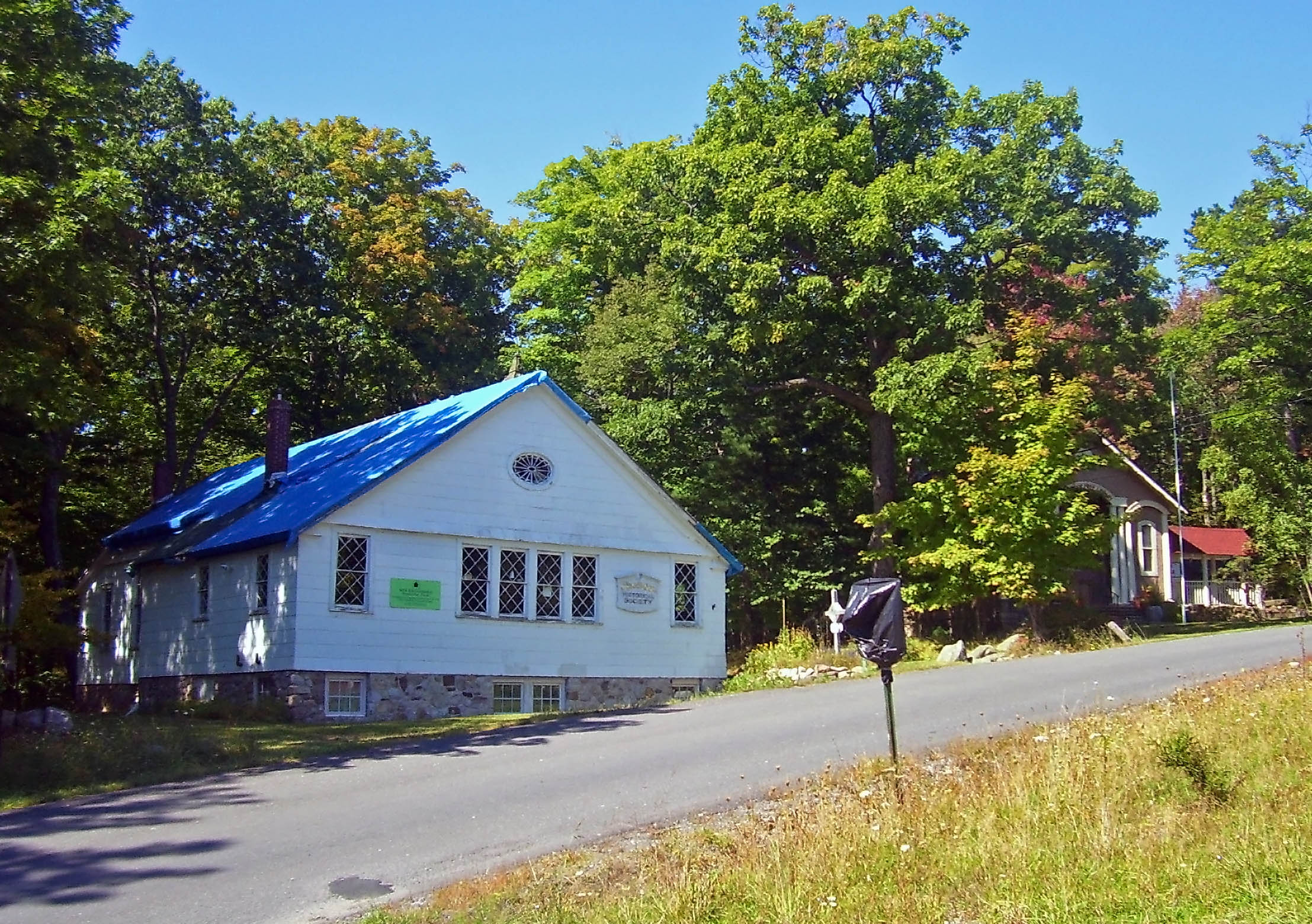
- Dellenbaugh-designed Cragsmoor library and historical museum, 2007

- Location within New York Location within the United States
- Location: Cragsmoor, NY
- Nearest city: Poughkeepsie
- Coordinates: 41°40′13″N 74°22′36″W
- Area: 362 acres (146 ha)
- Built: mid-19th to mid-20th century
- Architect: Bert Goldsmith, Frederick Dellenbaugh, among others
- Architectural style: Shingle Style architecture#Shingle, Colonial Revival, Federal
- NRHP reference No.: 96000860
- Added to NRHP: August 8, 1996

The Cragsmoor Historic District in a historic district that includes most of the Cragsmoor hamlet atop the Shawangunk Ridge in the Town of Wawarsing, part of Ulster County, New York, United States. It is roughly bounded by Henry, Cragsmoor and Sam's Point roads, a Y-shaped area of 3,620 acres (14.5 km²). Within it are 168 buildings (mostly homes), 15 structures and 11 objects, all located amidst a quiet, heavily wooded ridgetop community. It was added to the National Register of Historic Places in 1996.

Many of the buildings in the district date to Cragsmoor's founding as an art colony in the late 19th century, when Edward Lamson Henry and some of his fellow painters visited what was then a small mountain hamlet for local loggers and grew enamored of the scenery. Many homes were designed by Frederick Dellenbaugh and Bert Goldsmith. George Inness, Jr. and Charles Courtney Curran were among the artists who lived and worked here.
