= Inness =

Inness may refer to:

== People ==
- Gary Inness (born 1949), Canadian ice hockey goaltender
- George Inness (1825-1894), American landscape painter
- George Inness, Jr. (1854-1926), American figure and landscape artist, and son of George Inness
- Julia Goodrich Roswell-Smith Inness (1853–1941), American clubwoman and wife of George Inness Jr.
- Mathew Inness (born 1978) Australian cricket player

== Places ==
- Inness-Fitts House and Studio/Barn, historic house in Medfield, Massachusetts
