= Chetolah =

Historic house in New York, United States

- U.S. National Register of Historic Places
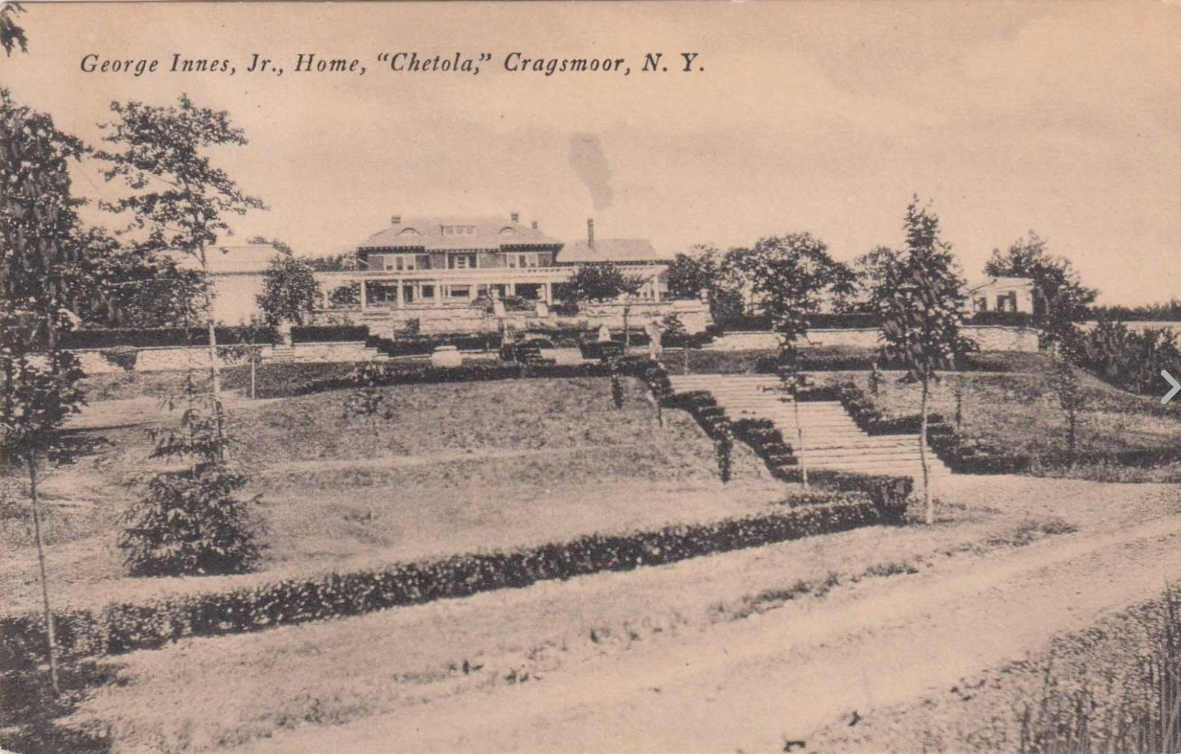
- Postcard showing the George Innes, Jr. Estate

- Location within New York Location within the United States
- Nearest city: Cragsmoor, New York
- Coordinates: 41°39′39″N 74°22′39″W
- Area: 115 acres (47 ha)
- Built: 1901
- Architect: Inness, George, Jr.; Greenley, Howard
- Architectural style: Colonial Revival, Mixed (more Than 2 Styles From Different Periods), Queen Anne
- NRHP reference No.: 80002782
- Added to NRHP: October 21, 1980

Chetolah, also known as the George Inness, Jr. Estate, is a historic estate located at Cragsmoor in Ulster County, New York.

== Description ==
The estate includes the main house and 10 support structures. The main house was begun in 1901 and is a large, rambling, 2 1/2-story, eclectic style residence with a hipped, metal-sheathed roof with both shed and eyelid type dormers. It features both a stucco and shingled exterior. Other buildings include a greenhouse, studio, garage, two residences, a log cabin, and stone tower and gatehouse. It was designed by and used as a summer home by George Inness, Jr. (1854–1926), son of noted artist George Inness (1825–1894). In 1936, the estate was purchased by the missionary order Daughters of Mary, Health of the Sick and served as Motherhouse and Novitiate until 1970.

It was listed on the National Register of Historic Places in 1980.
