= Bear Hill =

Mountain in New York, United States

- Location within New York Location within the United States

Highest point
- Elevation: 1,946 feet (593 m)
- Coordinates: 41°40′02″N 74°23′49″W

Geography
- Location: Ellenville, New York, U.S.
- Topo map: USGS Ellenville

Bear Hill is a mountain located in the Catskill Mountains of New York south of Ellenville. Losees Hill is located east, and Mount Meenahga is located northeast of Bear Hill.

Bear Hill is part of the Shawangunk Mountains. The closest hamlet is Cragsmoor, New York.

The Bear Hill Preserve is roughly coterminous with Bear Hill, and offers hiking and picnicking. This is a private park, managed by the not-for-profit Cragsmoor Association, with public access for a fee. Scenic Hudson Valley, a local environmental organization, recommends the hiking trail for its views and challenging "Grapefruit Squeeze."
