= Austa Densmore Sturdevant =

American artist

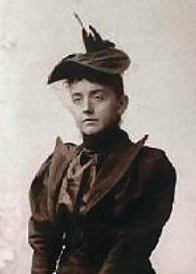
- Born: Austa Densmore; 1855; Blooming Valley, Pennsylvania
- Died: 1936 (aged 80–81); Kingston, New York
- Known for: Painting
- Spouse: James Warner Sturdevant

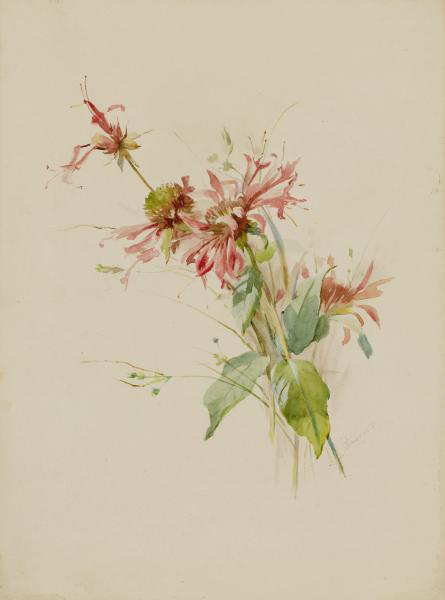
Bergamot (or Bee Baum)

Austa Densmore Sturdevant (1855-1936) was an American painter.

== Biography ==
Sturdevant née Densmore was born in Blooming Valley, Pennsylvania in 1855. She married James Warner Sturdevant with whom she had two children. She studied at Allegheny College where she earned both a bachelor's and Master of Arts degree. She went on to study at the Art Students League of New York and the Metropolitan Museum of Art. In 1895 she went to Paris for several years to continue her studies. In Paris she exhibited at the Paris Salon.

When Sturdevant returned to the United States she established the Cragsmoor Inn in Cragsmoor, New York which became part of the art colony that flourished there. She died in 1936 in Kingston, New York.

Sturdevant's work is in the collection of the Smithsonian American Art Museum. Her papers are in the Archives of American Art at the Smithsonian Institution.
