= The 9:45 Accommodation =

Series of paintings by Edward Lamson Henry

9:45 A.M. Accommodation, Stratford, Connecticut, April 1864
- The 9:45 Accommodation
- Artist: Edward Lamson Henry
- Year: 1864
- Medium: Oil on wood panel
- Dimensions: 31.75 cm × 50.8 cm (12.50 in × 20.0 in)
- Location: Charles Hosmer Morse Museum of American Art; Winter Park, Florida

The 9:45 Accommodation is a 19th-century painting by American artist Edward Lamson Henry. Done in oil on canvas, the work depicts a train being boarded. Several notable versions of the painting have been produced, the first being an 1864 painting on wood panel and the second being an 1867 oil on canvas painting. The original 1864 work is in the collection of the Morse Museum of American Art, while the 1867 work is in the collection of the Metropolitan Museum of Art.

== Description ==
=== History ===
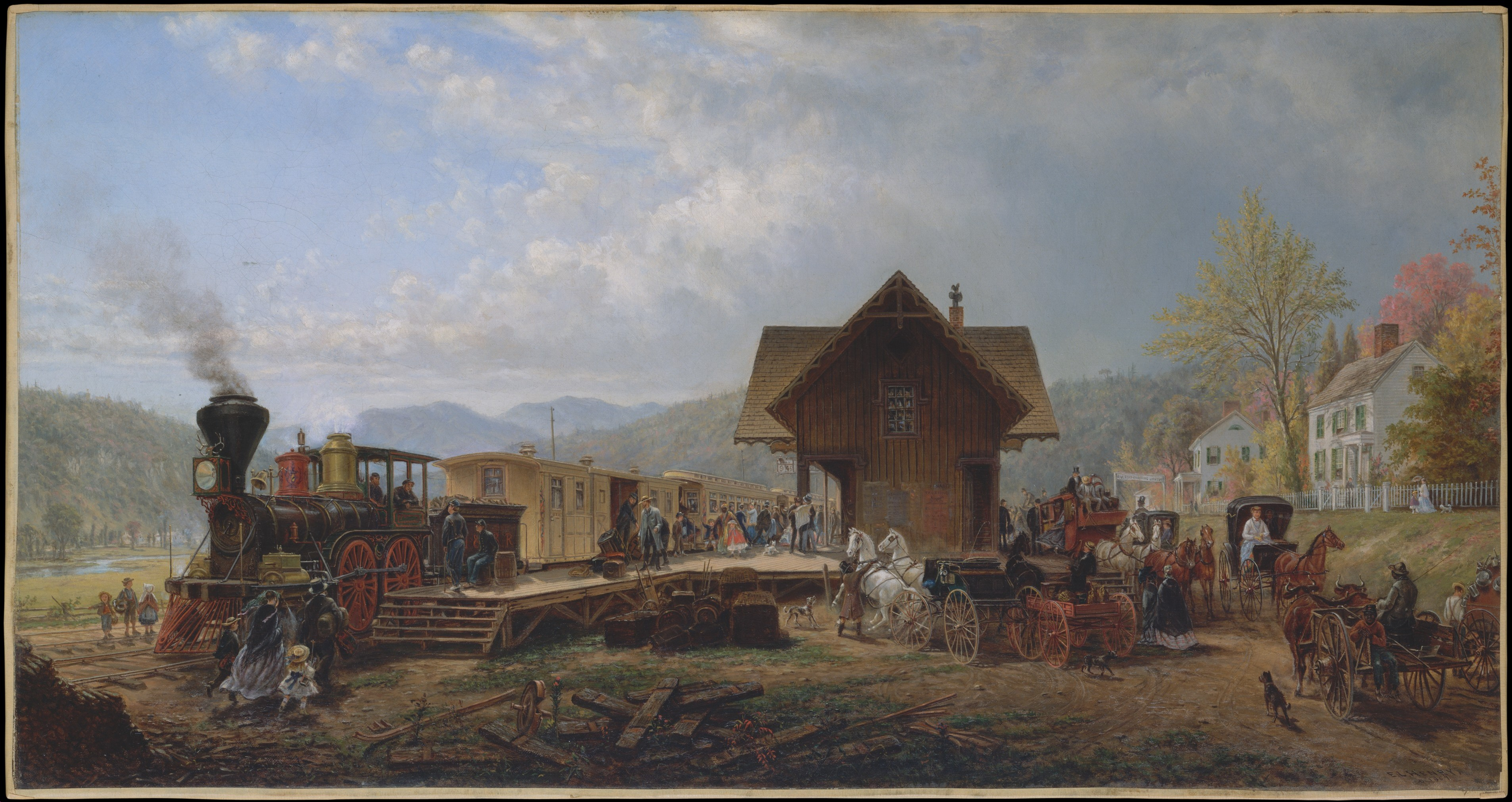
The 1867 iteration of the work in the collection of the Metropolitan Museum of Art. As opposed to the 1864 version of the painting, the Met painting is done in oil on canvas.

Henry painted his original 9:45 in 1864 using oil paint on wood panel. This earliest painting is in the collection of the Morse Museum of American Art in Winter Park, Florida. The museum's first director, Hugh F. McKean, once described 9:45 as a painting that "has won the hearts of many Americans."

A second, widely reproduced version of the painting was painted by Henry for American businessman John Taylor Johnston, president of the New Jersey Central Railroad. Johnston also served as the first President of the Metropolitan Museum of Art, where the 1867 painting is on display.

=== Painting ===
Edward Lamson Henry, a noted genre painter, was deeply interested in transportation. This interest included trains, a key part of 19th century America's infrastructure. As noted by the Met's description of the work, the model of train station depicted in the 1867 painting was widely produced, rendering the exact station hard to identify. Per the museum, Henry may have also used elements from multiple stations in his depiction of a bustling station.
