= Daughters of Mary, Health of the Sick =

Roman Catholic religious institute

- Filiarum Mariae, Salutem Infirmorum
- Abbreviation: F.M.S.I.
- Named after: Saint Mary
- Formation: 1935
- Founder: Edward F. Garesche
- Dissolved: 1976
- Type: Roman Catholic religious institute
- Headquarters: Cragsmoor, New York, United States
- Parent organization: Catholic Church

The Daughters of Mary, Health of the Sick was a Roman Catholic religious institute for women. The order was founded in 1935 by Rev. Edward F. Garesche SJ with authorization of the Archbishop of New York, Cardinal Patrick Joseph Hayes.

Their motherhouse, Vista Maria, was established in 1936 in Cragsmoor, New York. In 1953, a foreign mission was founded in Okinawa. The sisters devoted their time to caring for the sick and needy through medical ministry, as well as religious instruction. In 1976 the order disbanded. Some members joined other religious orders, including the Sisters of Charity of New York.
