= Edward Lamson Henry =

19th/20th-century American painter

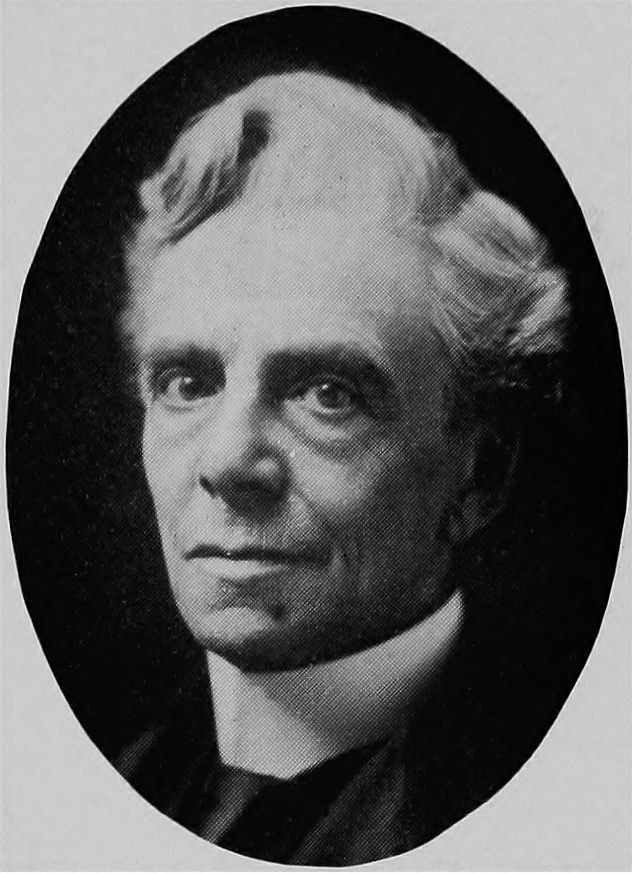
- Born: January 12, 1841; Charleston, South Carolina
- Died: May 9, 1919 (aged 78); Ellenville, New York
- Occupation: Painter

Edward Lamson Henry (January 12, 1841 – May 9, 1919), commonly known as E.L. Henry, was an American genre painter, born in Charleston, South Carolina.

== Early life ==
Though born in Charleston, by age seven his parents had died, and Henry moved to live with cousins in New York City. He began studying painting there, and later at the Pennsylvania Academy of Fine Arts in Philadelphia. In 1860 he went to Paris, where he studied with Charles Gleyre and Gustave Courbet, at roughly the same time as Claude Monet, Pierre-Auguste Renoir, Frédéric Bazille, and Alfred Sisley.

In 1862, he returned to the United States, where he served as a clerk on a Union transport ship in the American Civil War. After the war he resumed his painting, with many works inspired by his experiences in the war. He moved into the prestigious Tenth Street Studio Building in Greenwich Village, where Winslow Homer also had a studio. In 1869, Henry was elected to the National Academy of Design, New York.

He died at his home in Ellenville, New York, on May 9, 1919.

== Painting ==
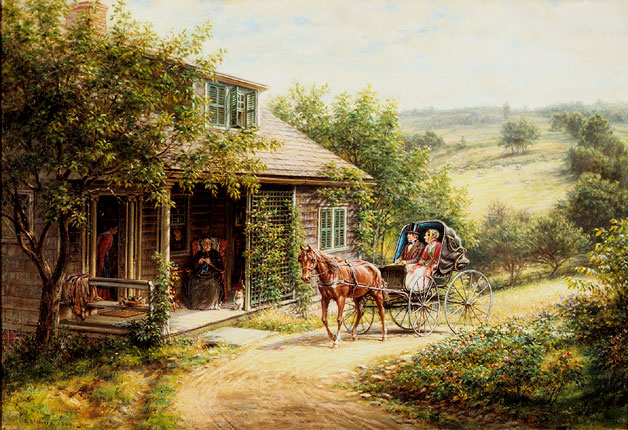
Unexpected Visitors, a typical painting of rural nostalgia

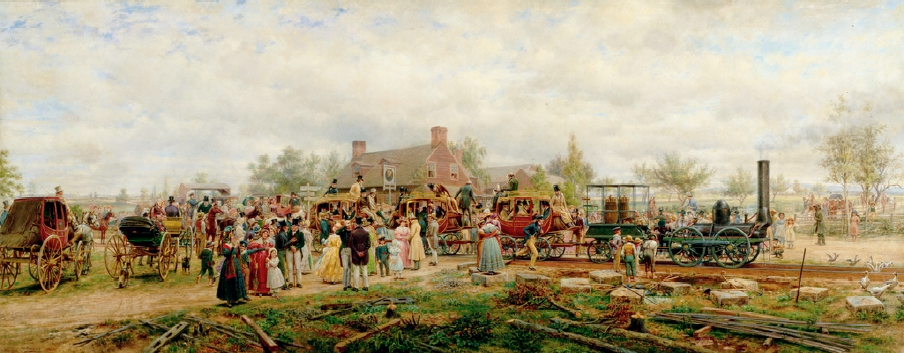
The First Railroad Train on the Mohawk and Hudson Road, 1892–93

As a painter of colonial and early American themes and incidents of rural life, he displays a quaint humor. He was best known for themes involving transportation, especially railroads, but also stagecoach and canal boat journeys, among other means, all rendered in minute detail.

Henry was a member of the New-York Historical Society. Because of his great attention to detail, his paintings were treated by contemporaries as authentic historical reconstructions. In 1884, Henry and his wife Frances Livingston Wells moved to the town of Cragsmoor in the Shawangunk Mountains of Upstate New York where they helped to found an artists' colony. Henry acquired a large collection of antiques, old photos, and assorted Americana, from which he researched his paintings. His wife Frances said that "Nothing annoyed him more than to see a wheel, a bit of architecture, etc. carelessly drawn or out of keeping with the time it was supposed to portray".

Henry's "historical fictions" often portrayed an idyllic and agrarian America, one relatively unperturbed by Civil War or by the growing phenomena of industrialization, urbanization and immigration that were taking place during the period in which he painted.

Henry's paintings were extremely popular throughout his life. Art professor William T. Oedel wrote of his legacy, "Perhaps no artist played so consistently and so durably to the American cult of nostalgia in the last quarter of the 19th century as Edward Lamson Henry."

== Gallery ==
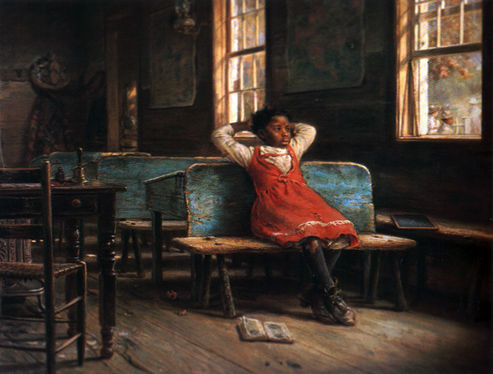
Kept In, 1888. Race was a theme in many of Henry's paintings, inspired by his time in the Civil War.

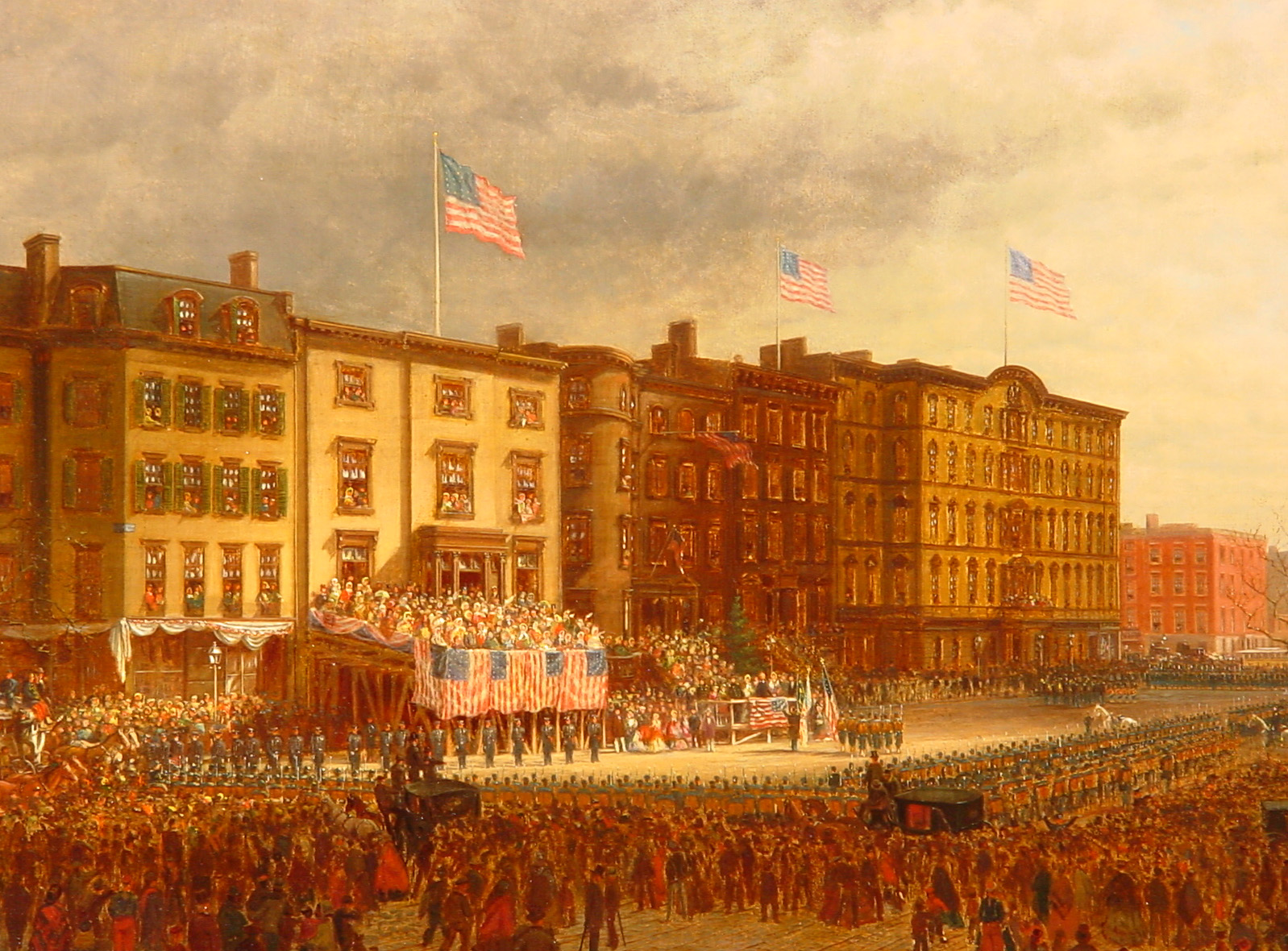
Presentation of Colors, 1864 depicts the outfitting of two African-American Civil War regiments at the Union League Club of New York.

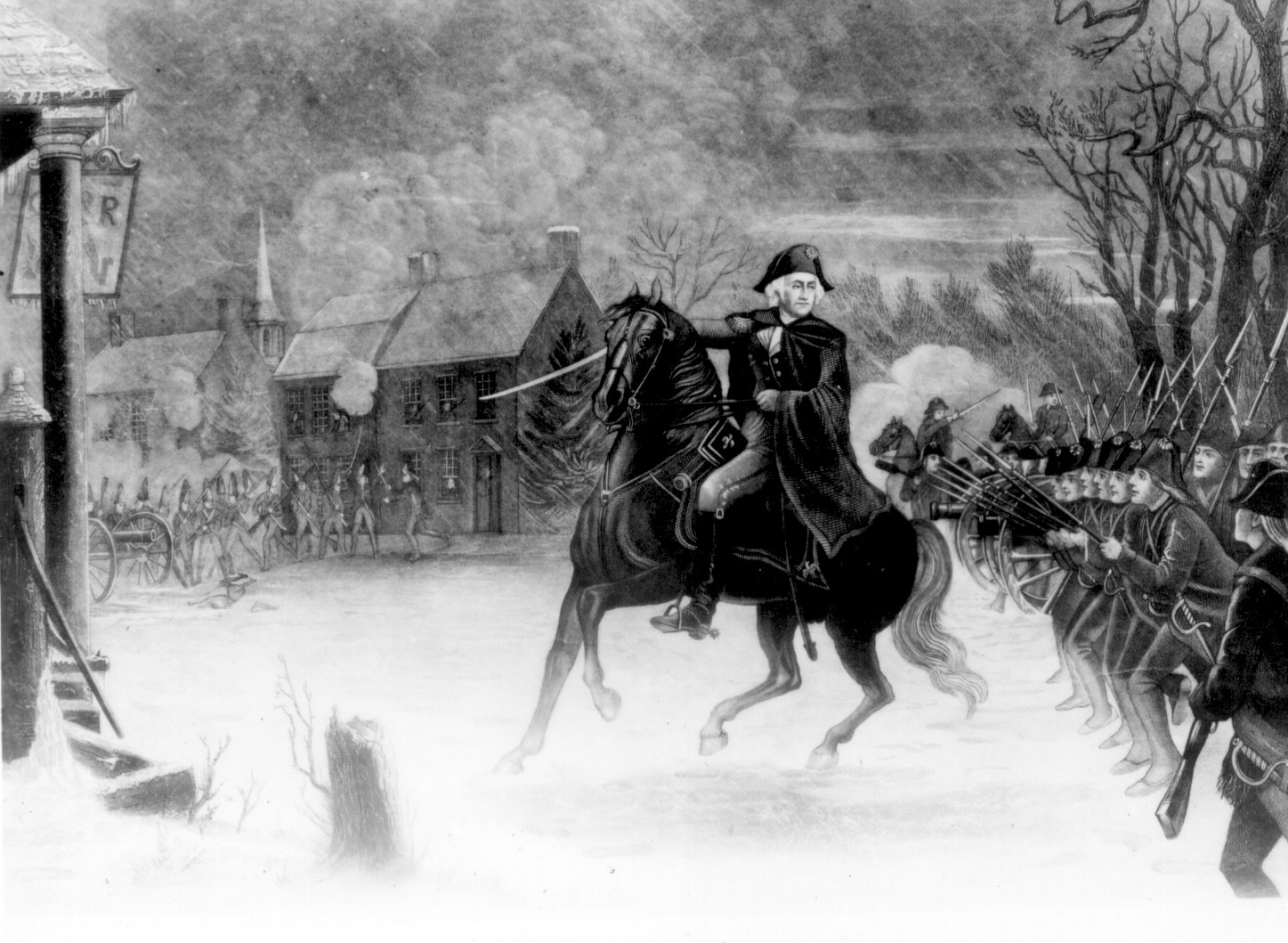
Washington at the Battle of Trenton, an engraving after a painting by Henry

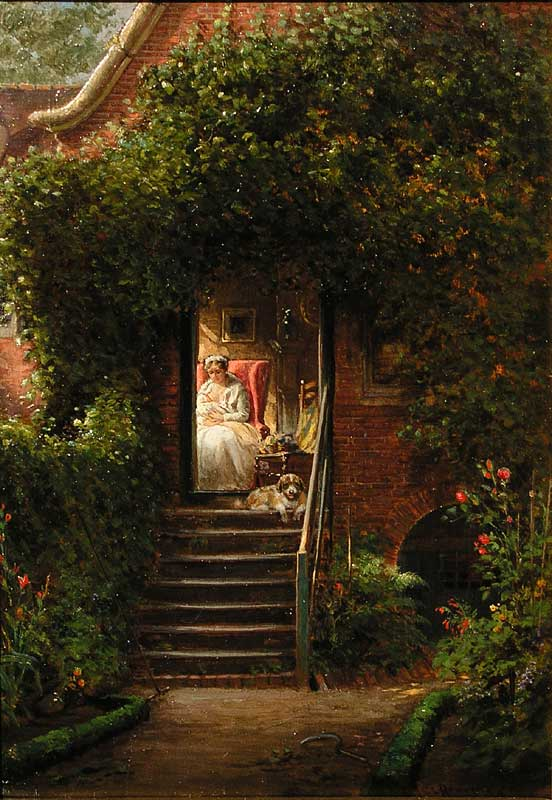
Motherhood. Much of Henry's work romanticized traditional American values.

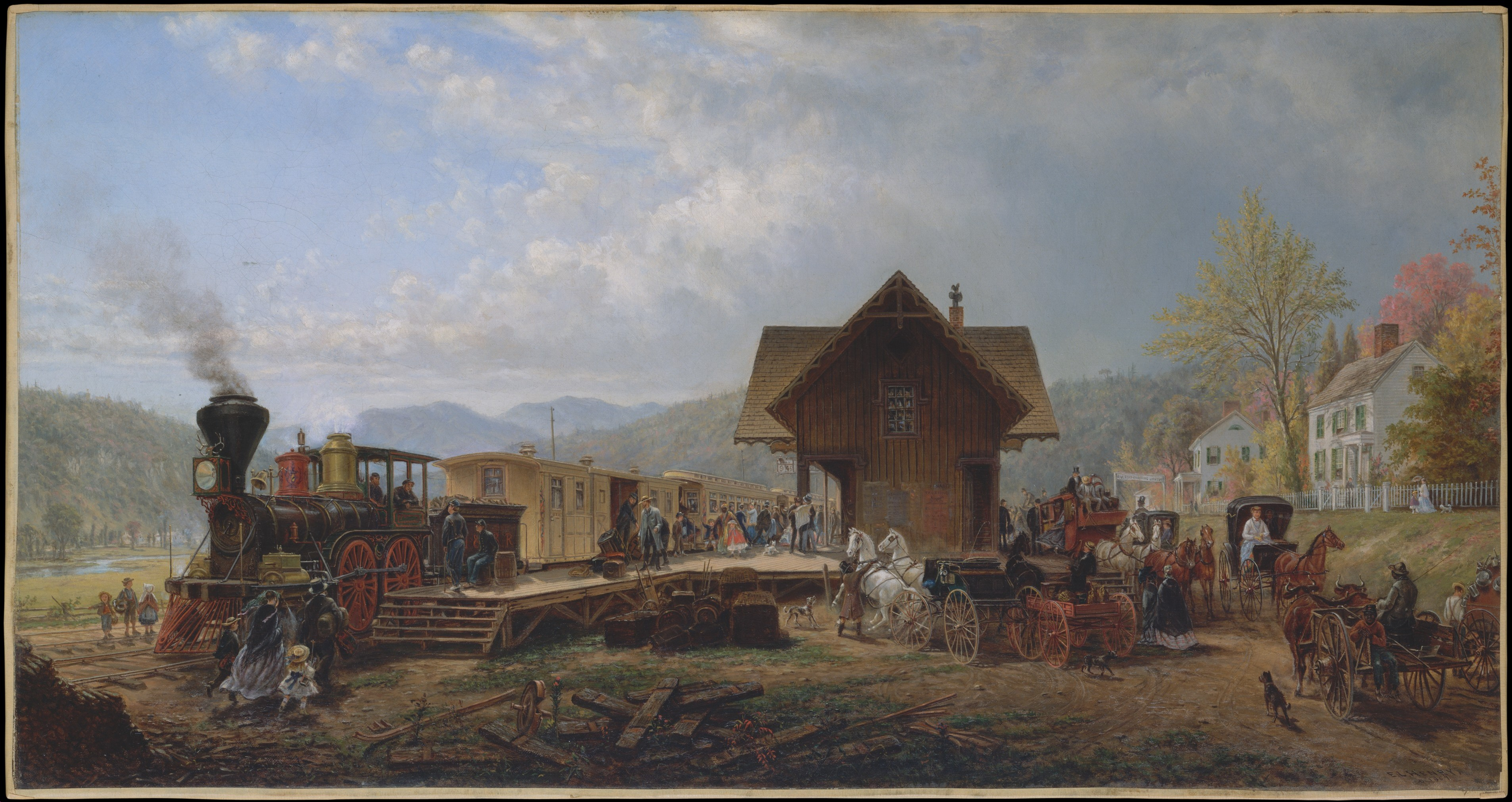
The 9:45 Accommodation

The Invalid
