= George Inness Jr. =

American painter (1854–1926)

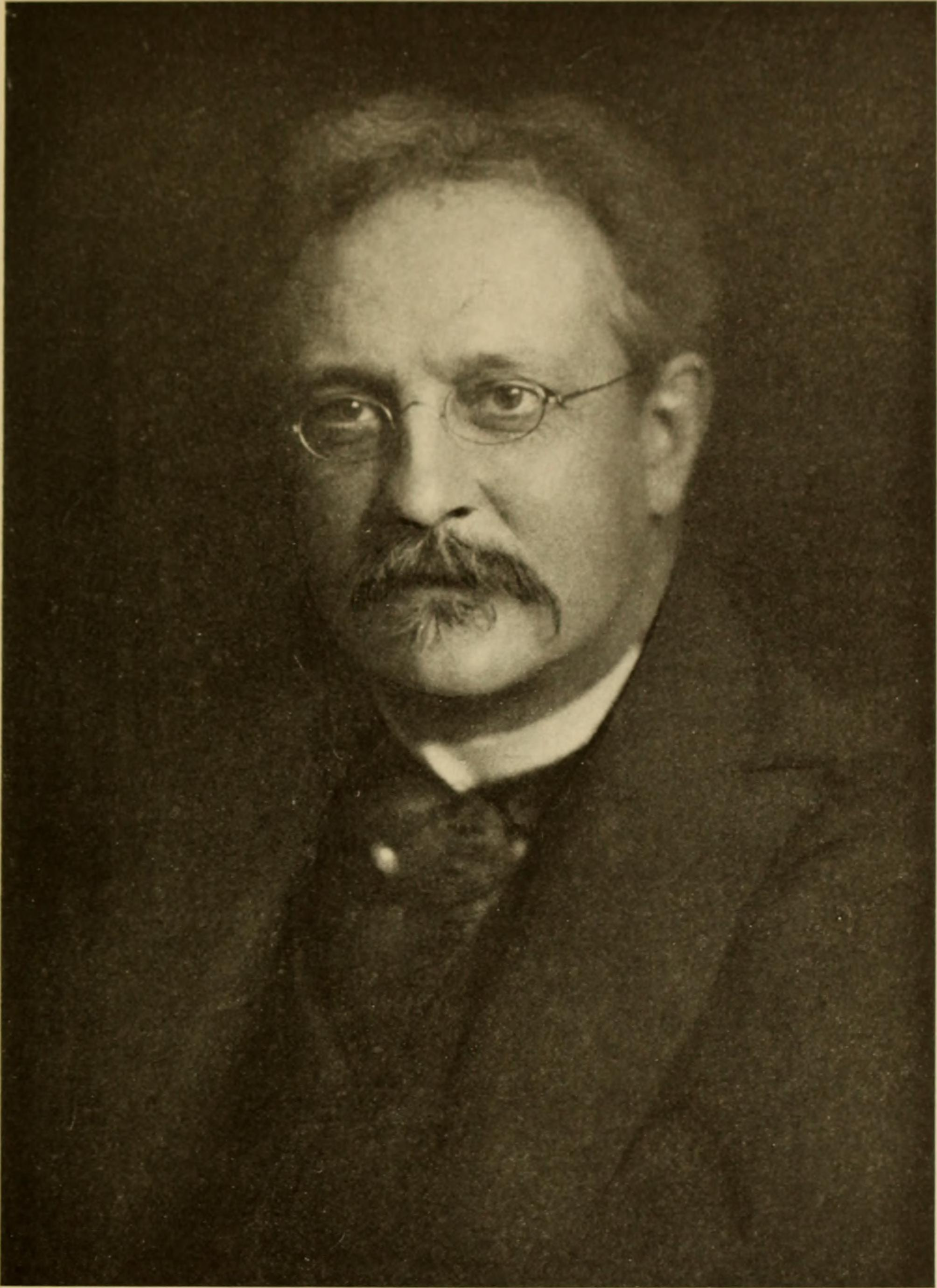
- Born: January 5, 1854
- Died: July 27, 1926 (aged 72)
- Resting place: Rosedale Cemetery
- Occupation: artist
- Spouse: Julia Goodrich Roswell-Smith
- Parent: George Inness (father)

George Inness Jr. (January 5, 1854 – July 27, 1926), was one of America's foremost figure and landscape artists and the son of George Inness, an important American landscape painter.

== Biography ==
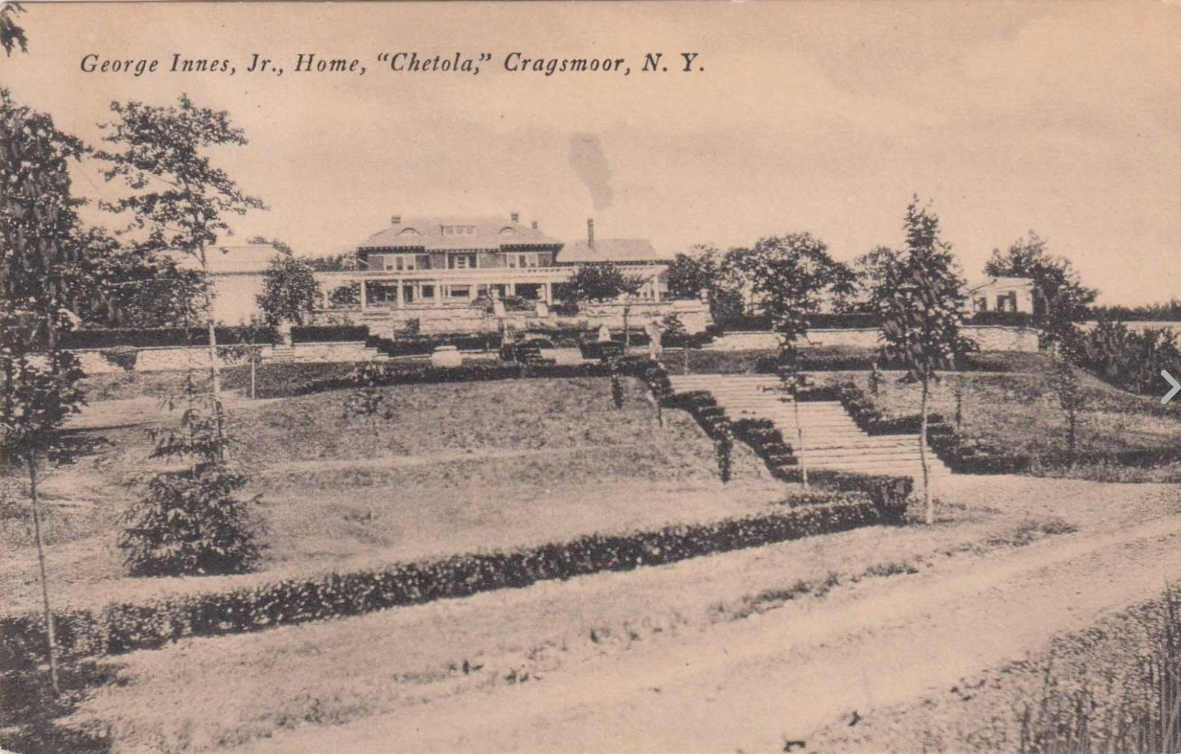
Postcard showing Chetolah, the George Inness Jr. estate in Cragsmoor, New York.

He studied with his father and Léon Bonnat in the 1870s in Europe, where he was made an officer of the Académie des Beaux-Arts. Like his father, he was considered a member of the Barbizon School and resisted impressionism.

Later he returned to the United States and became known for his paintings of animals and illustration of hunting scenes. In 1899 he was elected to the National Academy of Design. He lived and worked in Boston, New York City and New Jersey and finally in Tarpon Springs, Florida, where he produced most of his life's work. The Unitarian Universalist Church in Tarpon Springs contains a collection of eleven of his works, several of which are murals painted directly to the walls of the church sanctuary.

Inness married Julia Goodrich Roswell-Smith, the daughter of publisher Roswell Smith, who founded the publishing house the Century Company. Smith's purchase of a large canvas painted by Inness of New Hampshire's Mount Washington helped launch Inness's financial success, which did not come until middle age. Inness later purchased his home Wentworth Manor in Montclair, New Jersey, from his father-in-law Smith in 1889. His summer estate at Cragsmoor, New York, known as Chetolah, was listed on the National Register of Historic Places in 1980.

He is buried in Montclair's Rosedale Cemetery, next to his father.
