= Charles Courtney Curran =

American painter

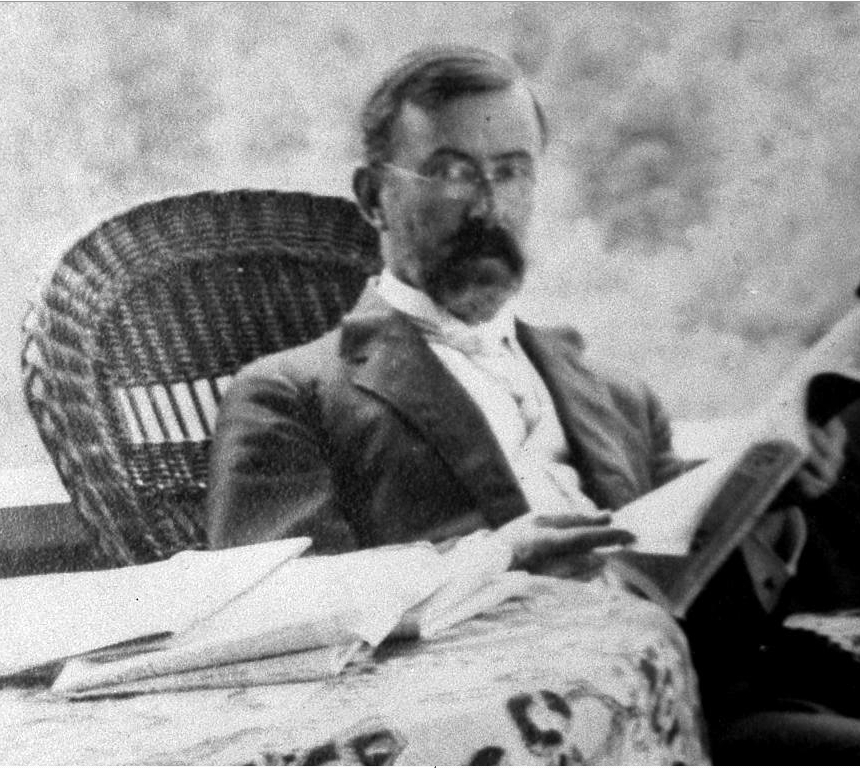
- Curran in 1909
- Born: February 13, 1861; Hartford, Kentucky
- Died: 9 November 1942 (aged 81); New York City
- Education: National Academy of Design, Académie Julian
- Known for: Painting
- Movement: Impressionism
- Spouse: Grace Wickham Curran
- Awards: Third Hallgarten Prize (1888); Second Hallgarten Prize (1895)

Charles Courtney Curran (13 February 1861 – 9 November 1942) was an American impressionist painter. He is best known for his canvases depicting women in various settings, as well as for his leadership role at the Cragsmoor Art Colony.

== Biography ==
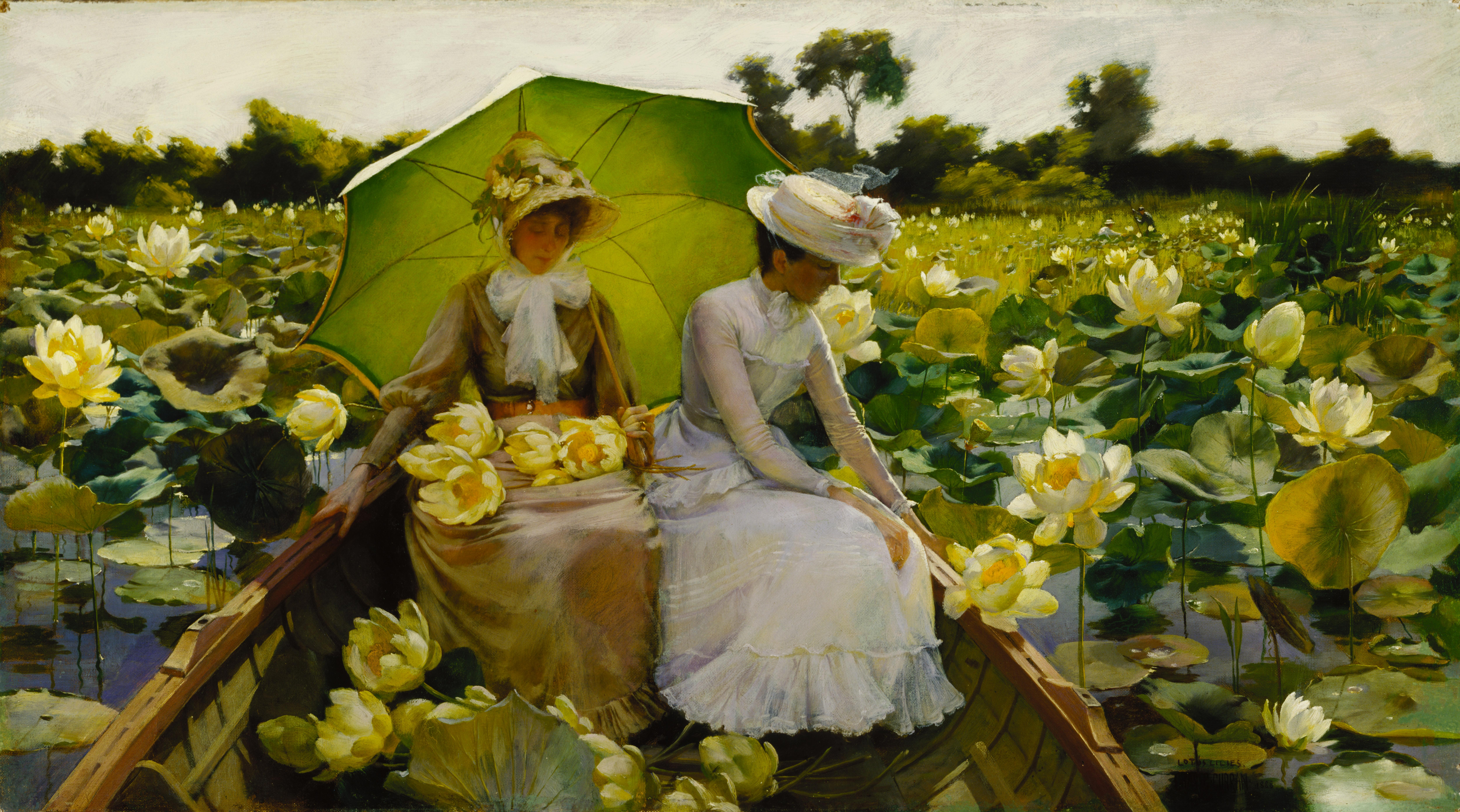
Lotus Lilies

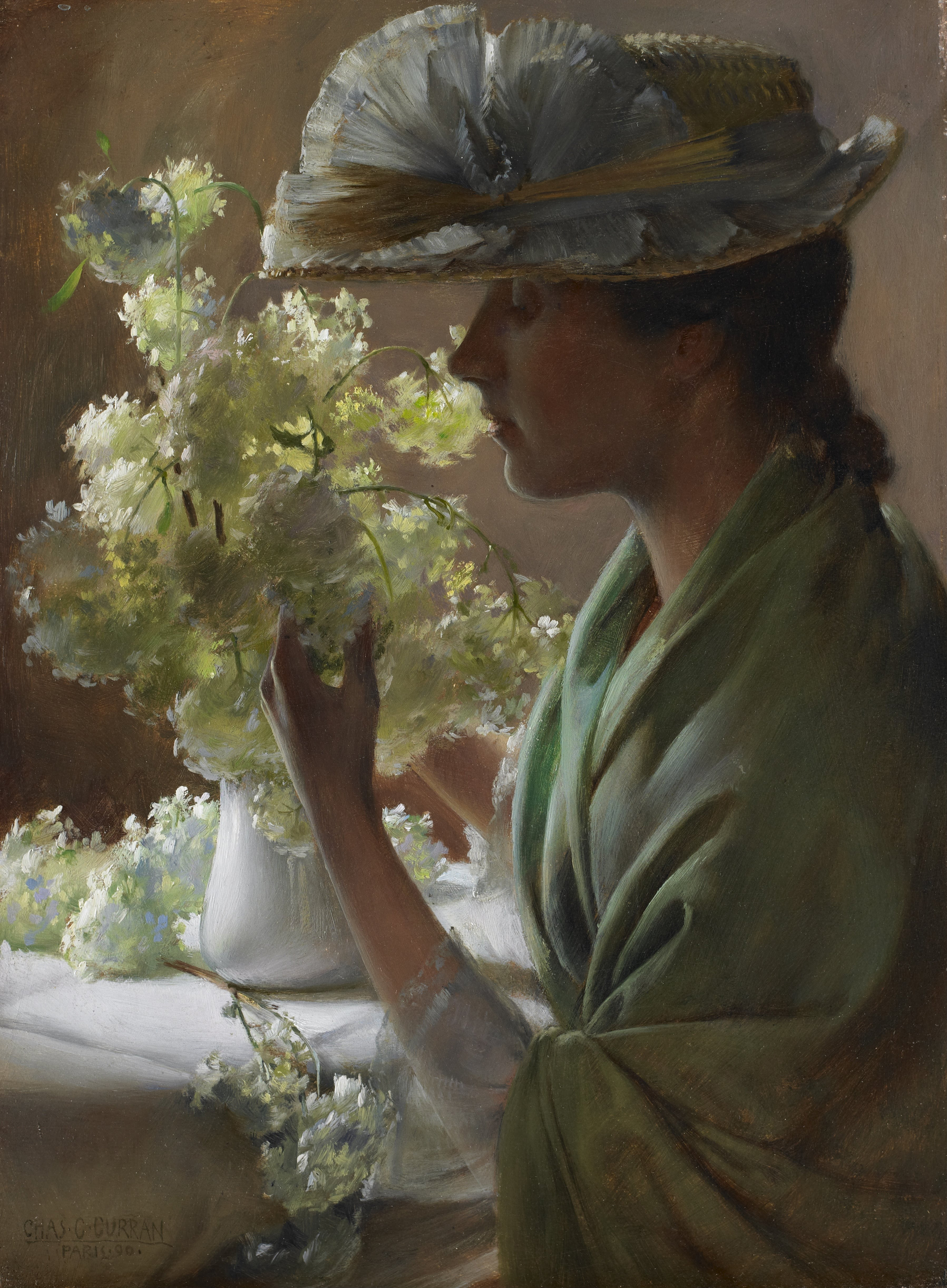
Lady with a Bouquet. The artist's wife with flowers from the Viburnum 'Snowball' bush

Curran was born in February, 1861, in Hartford, Kentucky, where his father taught at the school. A few months later, after the beginning of the Civil War, the family left there and returned to Ohio, eventually settling in Sandusky on the shores of Lake Erie where the elder Curran served as superintendent of schools.

Charles Curran showed an early interest and aptitude for art, and in 1881 went to Cincinnati to study at the McMicken School (later the Fine Arts Academy of Cincinnati). He stayed there only a year before going to New York to study at the National Academy of Design and the Art Students League where he studied under Walter Satterlee. Many of the pictures he created during this period featured young attractive working-class women engaged in a variety of tasks.

One was particularly noteworthy: Breezy Day (1887, collection of Pennsylvania Academy of the Fine Arts) and won the Third Hallgarten Prize for Oils from the NAD in 1888. Shortly thereafter Curran and his young bride Grace left the United States to study in Paris, where their first child Louis was born.

After two and half years abroad, the young family returned to the United States in June, 1891. For the next ten years Curran divided his time between New York where the couple had an apartment and Curran maintained a studio, and Ohio where they had extended family and spent most summers. In 1903 the Currans visited the summer arts colony of Cragsmoor for the first time. Located in the scenic Shawangunk Mountains about 100 miles northwest of New York City, the spectacular scenery and native flora inspired Curran to build a summer home there. He died in New York City in 1942.

== Career ==
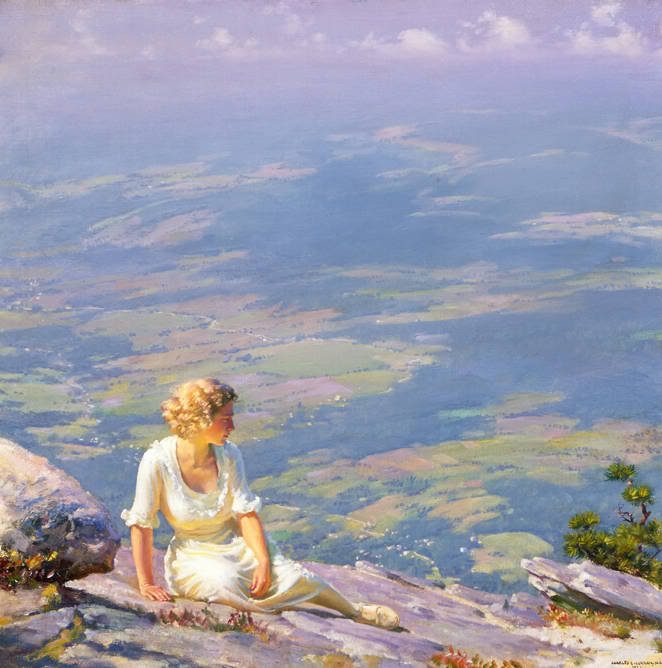
Sunshine and Haze (1915)

While in Paris, Curran enrolled at the Académie Julian where he began to concentrate on new subject matter and experimented with a variety of painting styles. Many of his pictures from this time were painted outdoors en plein air and features well dressed modern women enjoying a variety of leisure activities. Two pictures from this time spent in the French capital are In the Luxembourg (Garden) (1889, collection of Terra Foundation for American Art) and Afternoon in the Cluny Garden, Paris (1889, collection of The Fine Arts Museums of San Francisco). Curran also showed three of his pictures at the Paris Salons.

There Curran often used family members as models when he painted on the shores of Lake Erie, experimenting with a variety of artistic styles including impressionism, symbolism, tonalism and naturalism.

After the Currans visited the summer arts colony of Cragsmoor, the couple and their family would summer at Cragsmoor for the next forty years, and Curran would create some of his best known paintings in the vicinity. They feature young attractive girls dressed in white or pastel colors posed in brilliant sunshine. Two examples of these pictures are On the Heights (1909, collection of the Brooklyn Museum) and Hilltop Walk (1927, collection of Sheldon Museum of Art, University of Nebraska, Lincoln). Curran, along with his wife, became main figures at Cragsmoor. In addition to his own artwork, he taught painting, and with the assistance of his wife, helped edit the student art publication at the colony.

Although Curran continued to paint until shortly before his death, he never accepted or practiced newer artistic styles that emerged in the U.S. after World War I. He remained active with a number of arts organizations, especially the National Academy of Design where he served as secretary for fifteen years. He also became a successful portrait artist after 1920. In addition, Curran and his wife were avid travelers, visiting Europe at least five times and even mainland China in 1936.

== Works ==
Charles Curran's work is represented in numerous museum collections, and his outdoor paintings of youthful women have remained popular with individual collectors. It has been estimated that he produced more than 1500 pictures during his career. Besides oil paintings, these include watercolors and numerous illustrations for magazines in both color and black and white.

Charles Courtney Curran

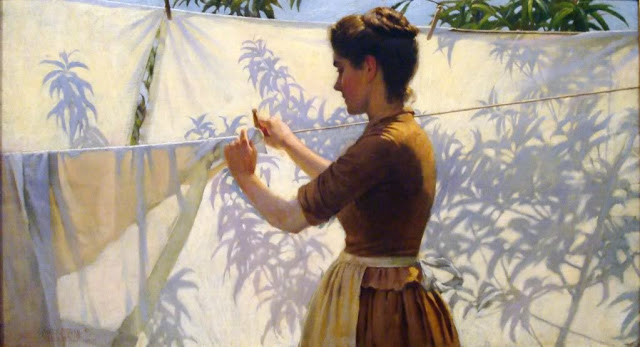
Shadows, 1887

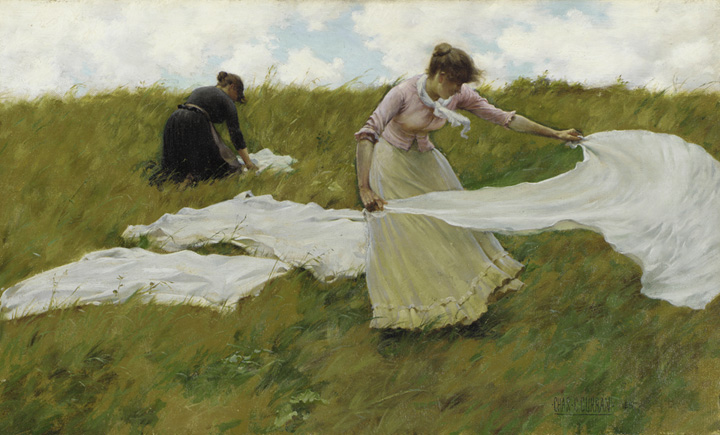
A Breezy Day, 1887. Pennsylvania Academy of the Fine Arts

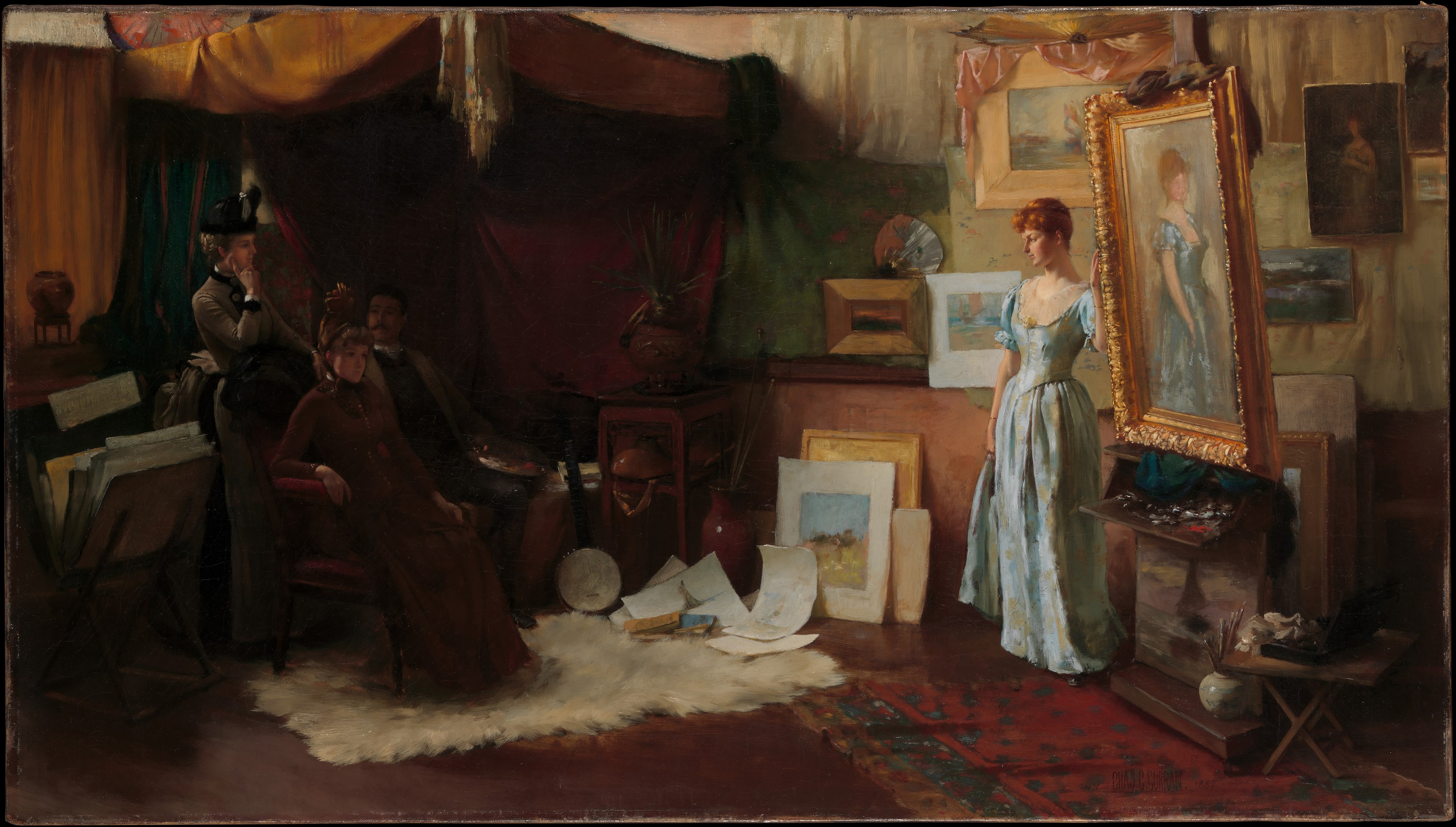
Fair Critics, 1887. Metropolitan Museum of Art

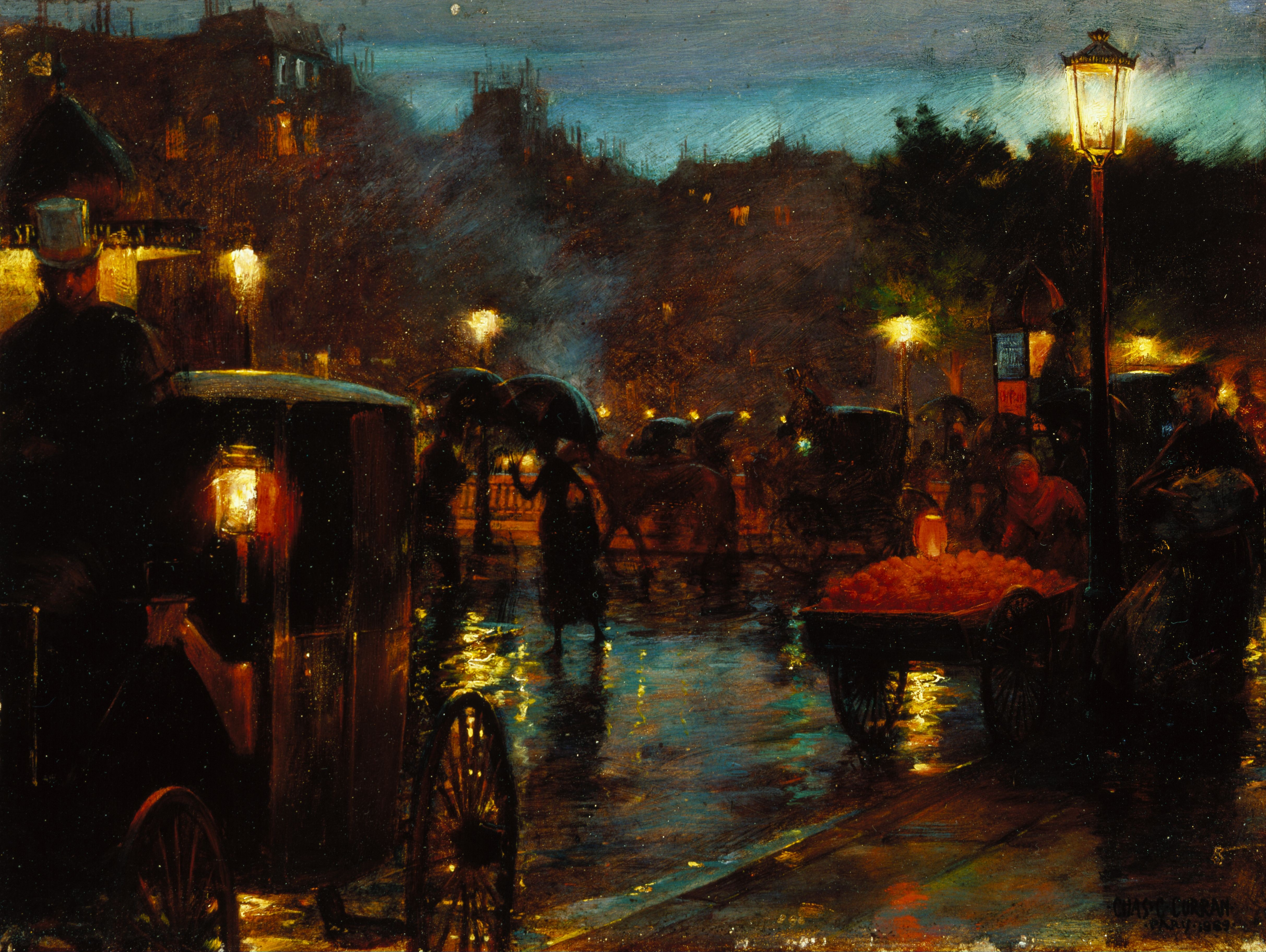
Paris at night, 1889. Terra Foundation for American Art

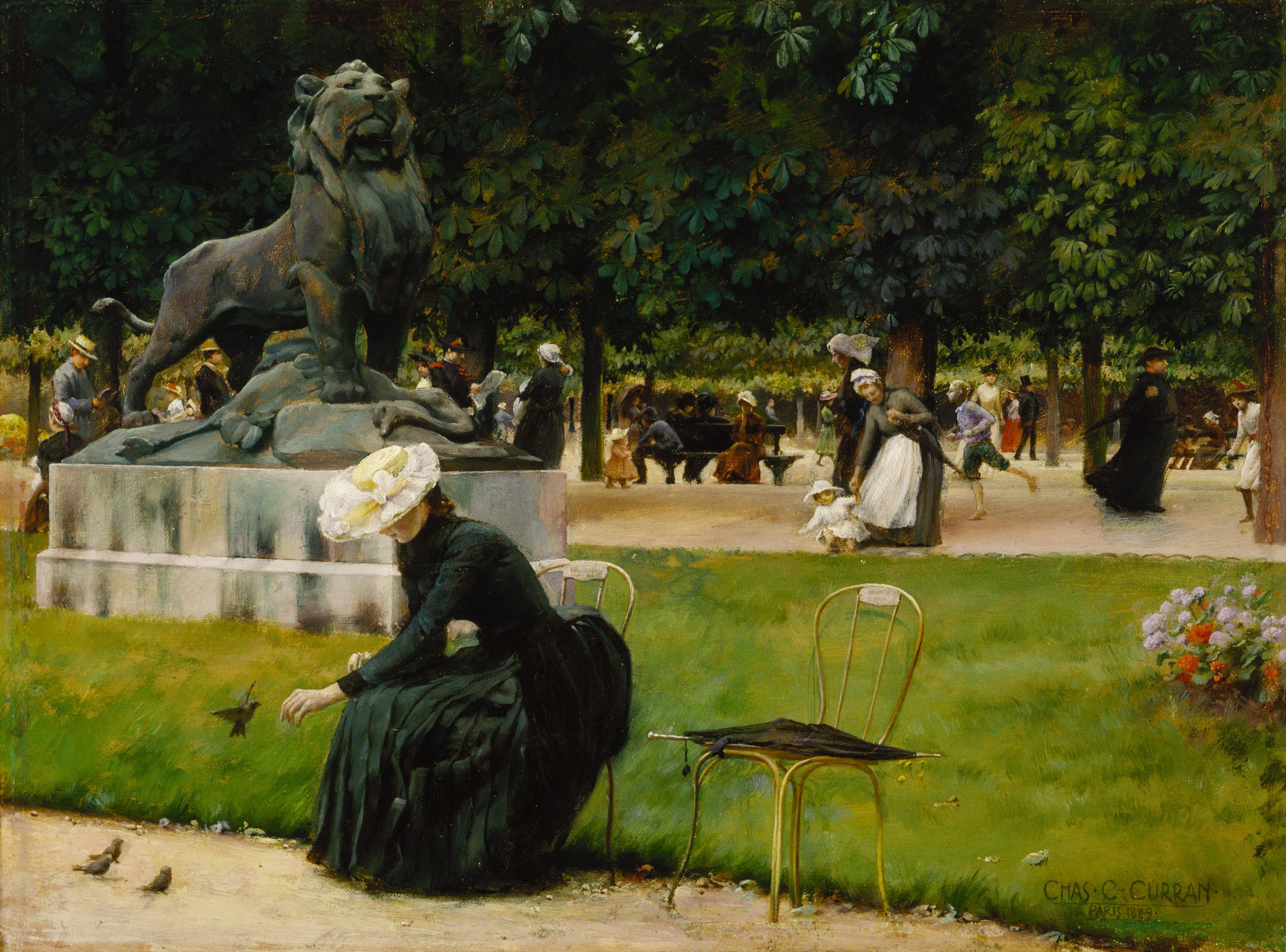
Dans le Jardin du Luxembourg or In Luxembourg's gardens, 1889. Terra Foundation for American Art

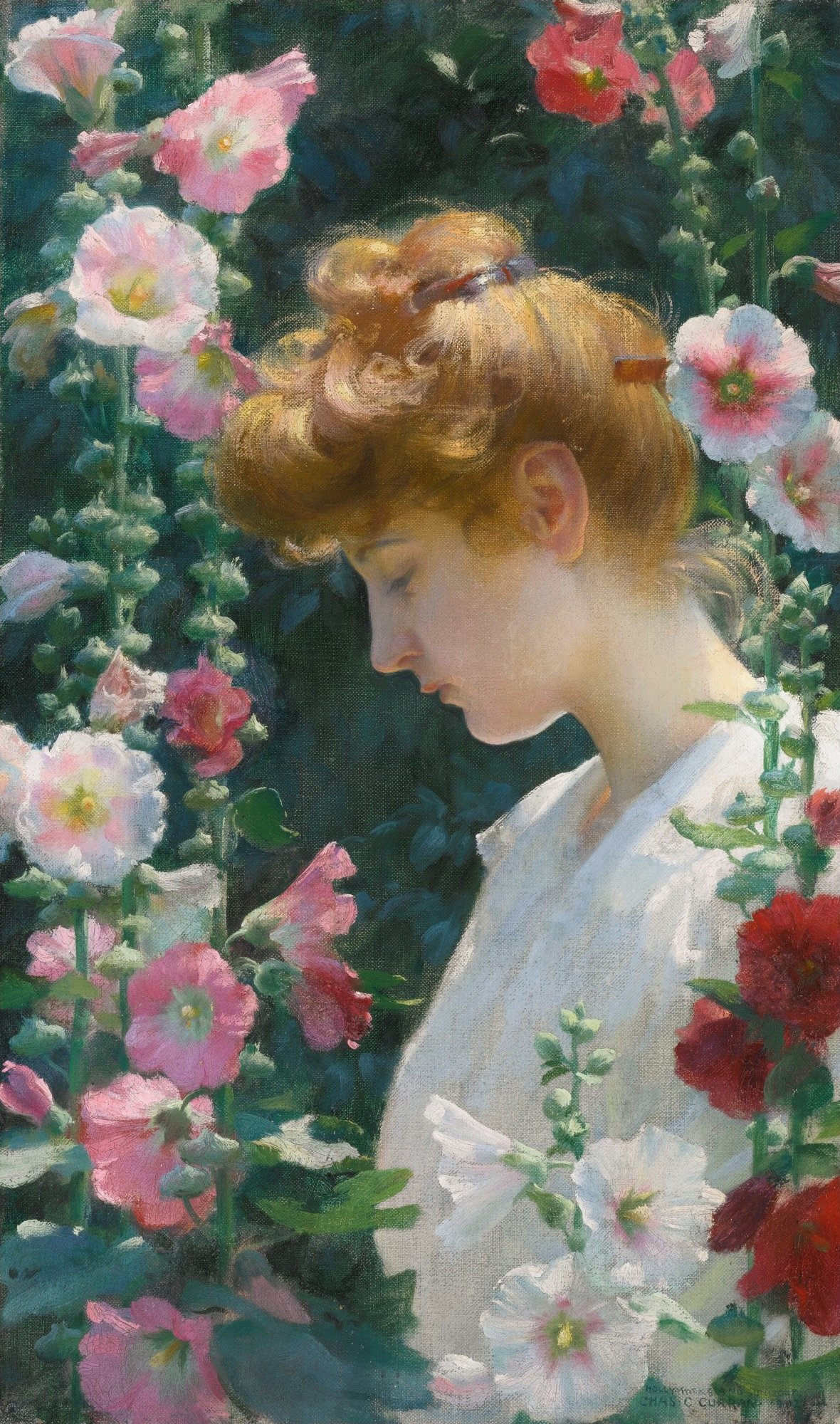
Hollyhocks and Sunlight, 1902

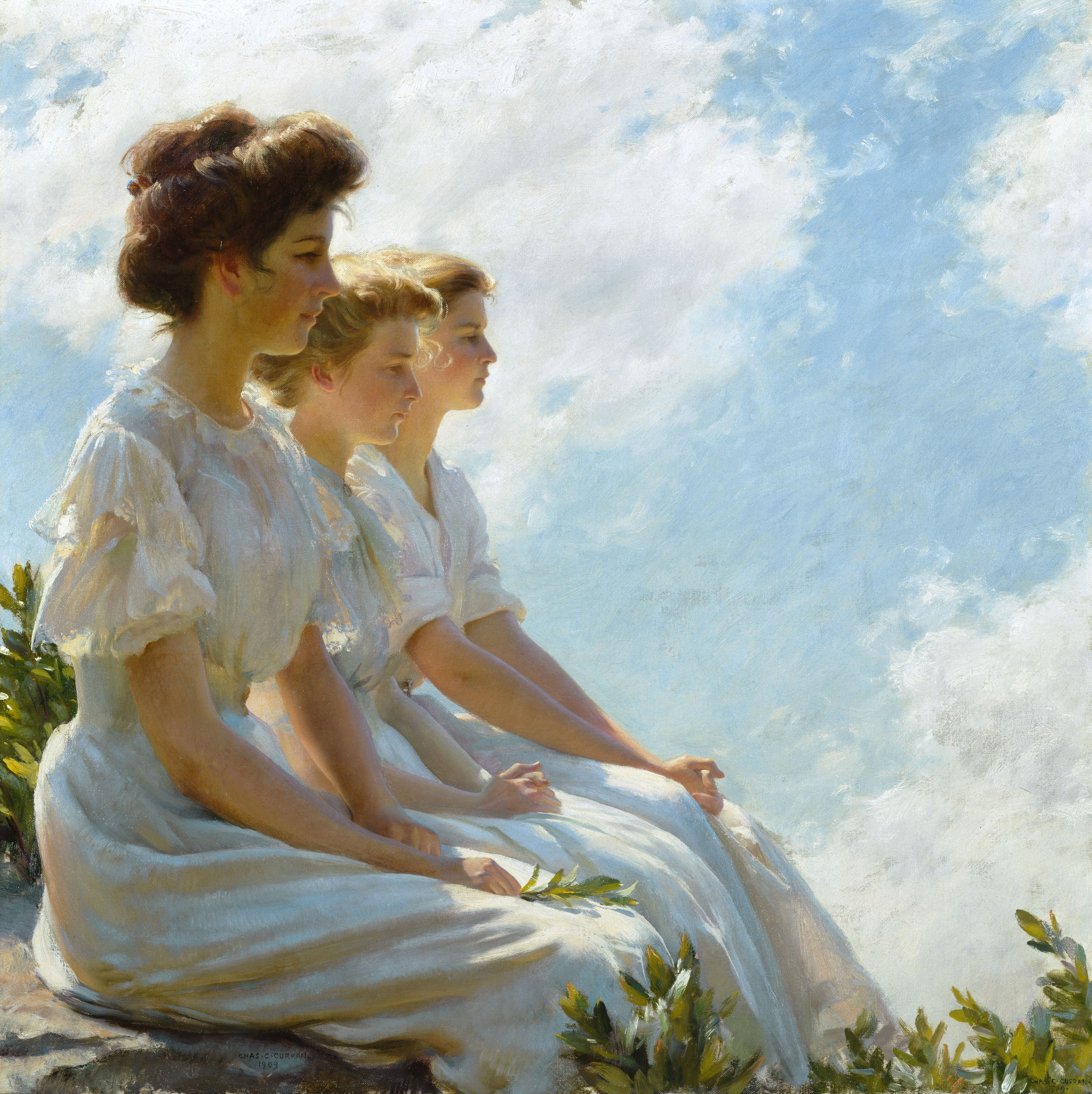
On the Heights, 1909. Brooklyn Museum

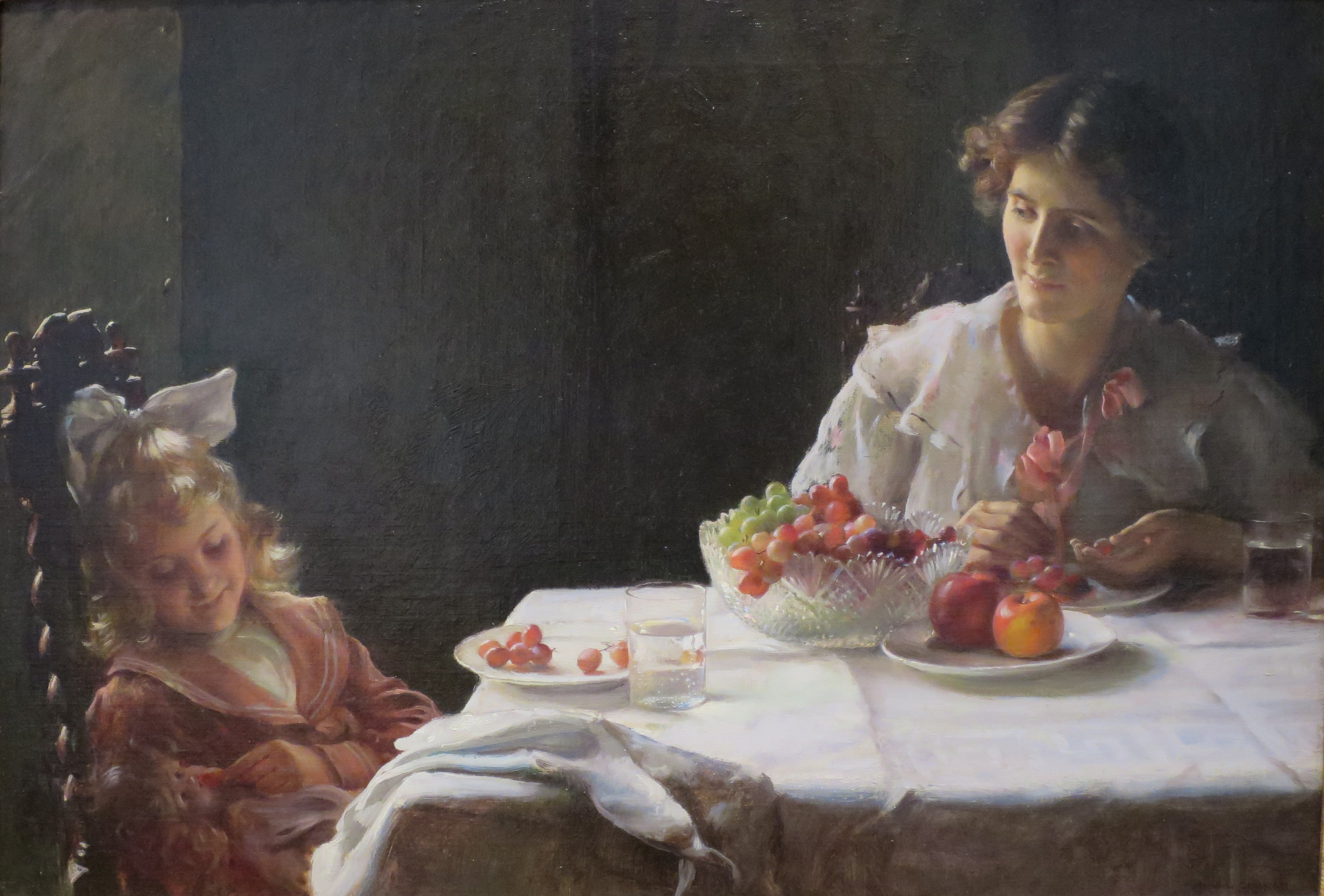
Breakfast for Three, 1909. High Museum of Art

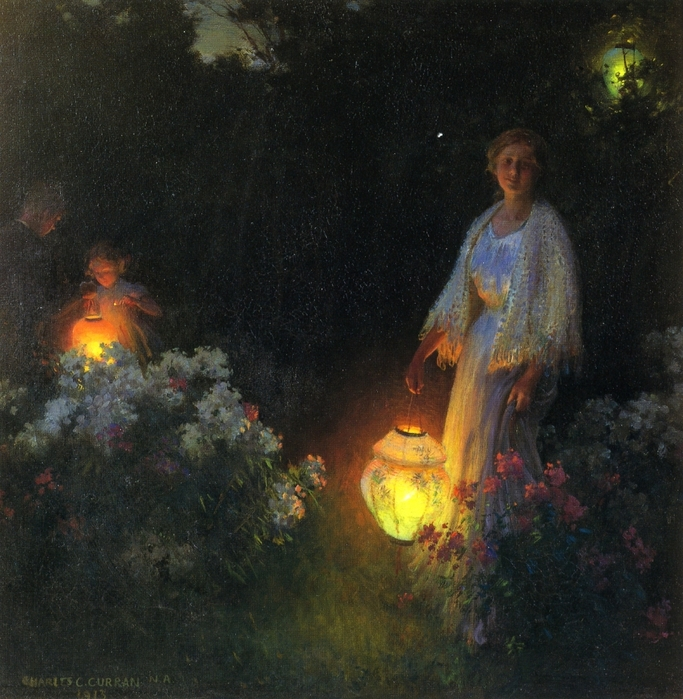
The Lanterns, circa 1910

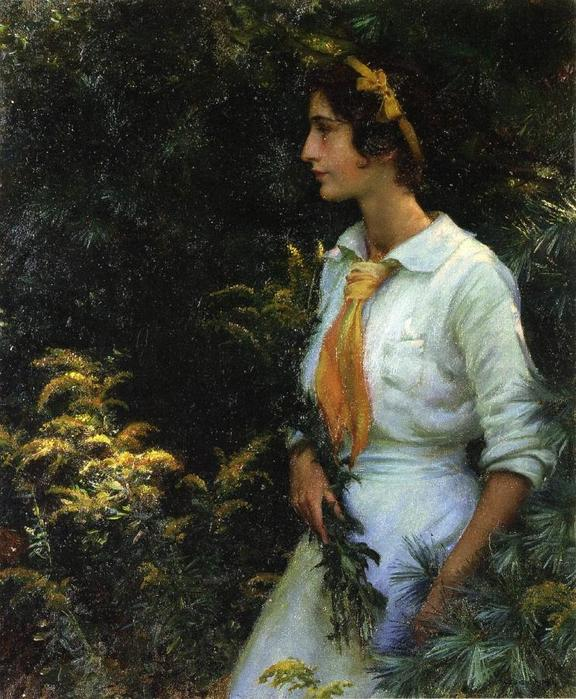
Goldenrod Curran, circa 1910

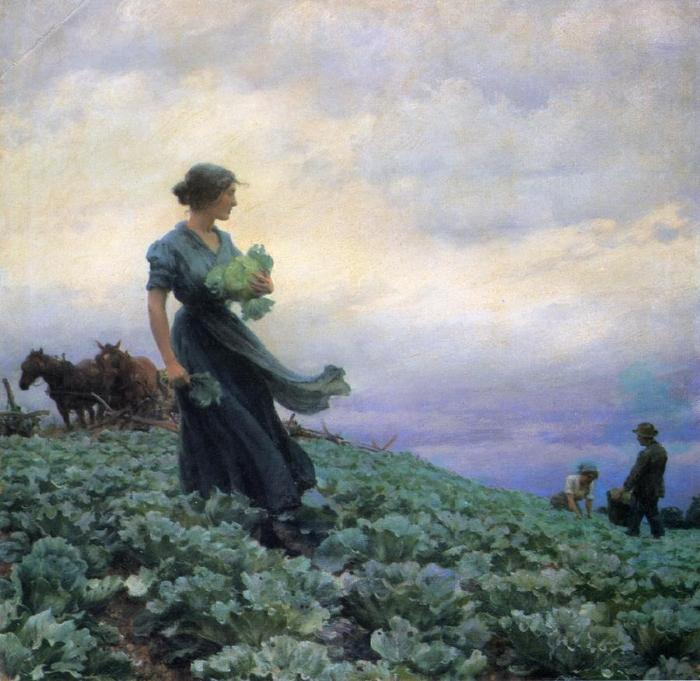
The Cabbage Field, 1914. Private collection

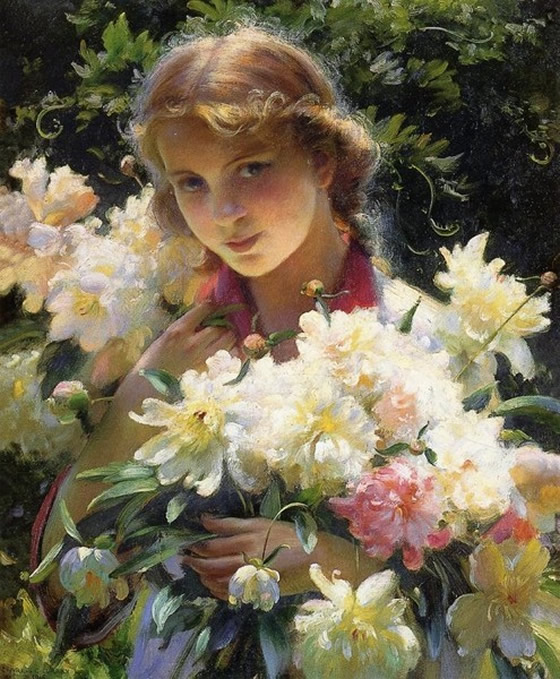
Peonies, 1915
