= Julia Goodrich Roswell-Smith Inness =

American clubwoman

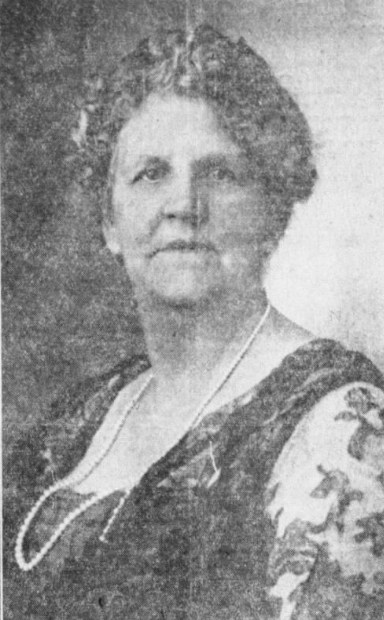
- Born: Julia Goodrich Roswell-Smith; April 23, 1853
- Died: May 24, 1941 (aged 88); New York, New York, U.S.
- Resting place: Rosedale Cemetery
- Occupation: Clubwoman
- Spouse: George Inness Jr.

Julia Goodrich Roswell-Smith Inness (April 23, 1853 – May 24, 1941) was an American clubwoman. She served as chairwoman of the Fine Arts of the Pinellas County Federation of Clubs and on the national executive committee of the General Society Daughters of the Revolution 1776.

== Early life and family ==
Inness was born on April 23, 1853, the daughter of publisher Roswell Smith, who founded The Century Company publishing house.

== Civic activities ==
In 1928, Inness was appointed as the chairwoman of the Fine Arts of the Pinellas County Federation of Clubs. She also served on the executive committee of the General Society Daughters of the Revolution 1776.

== Personal life and death ==
She was married to the painter George Inness Jr.. They had two daughters.

Her husband bought Wentworth Manor, her father's estate in Montclair, New Jersey, in 1889.

Inness died on May 24, 1941 at the Harkness Pavilion of the Columbia Presbyterian Medical Center in New York City.
