= Cragsmoor, New York =

- CDP
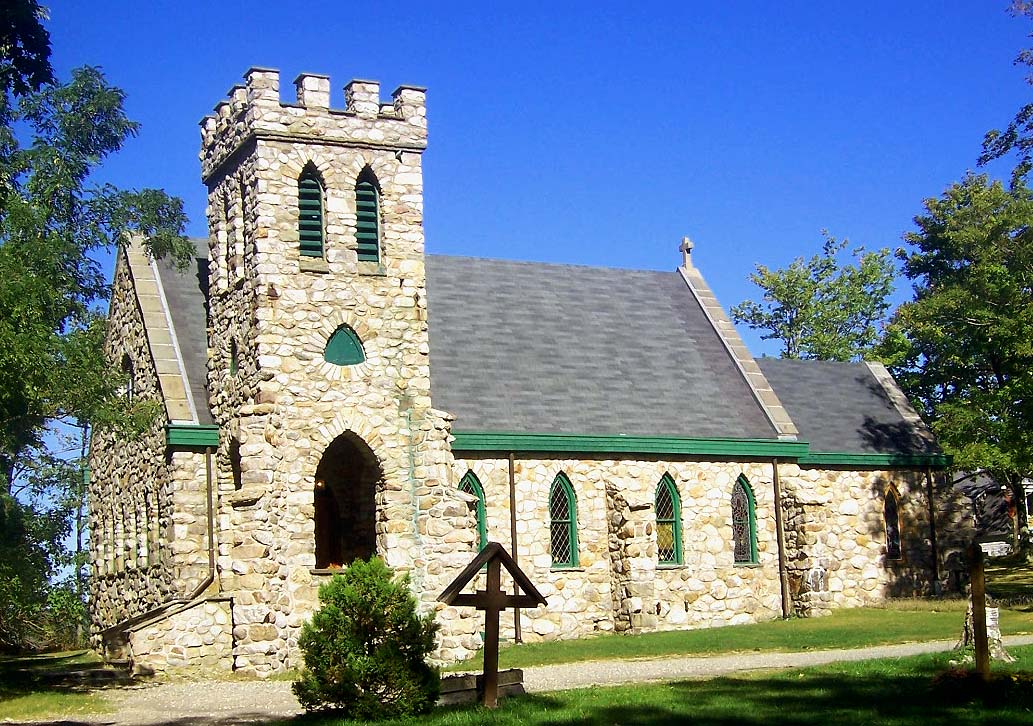
- The Old Stone Church (Episcopal), a Cragsmoor landmark

- Location in Ulster County and the state of New York.
- Coordinates: 41°40′6″N 74°23′17″W
- Country: United States
- State: New York
- County: Ulster

Area
  - Total: 4.36 sq mi (11.30 km^{2})
  - Land: 4.36 sq mi (11.30 km^{2})
  - Water: 0 sq mi (0.00 km^{2})
- Elevation: 1,864 ft (568 m)

Population (2020)
  - Total: 433
  - Density: 99.3/sq mi (38.33/km^{2})
- Time zone: UTC-5 (Eastern (EST))
  - Summer (DST): UTC-4 (EDT)
- ZIP code: 12420
- Area code: 845
- FIPS code: 36-18762
- GNIS feature ID: 0947634

Cragsmoor is a hamlet (and census-designated place) in Ulster County, New York, United States. The population was 433 at the 2020 census.

Cragsmoor is located atop the Shawangunk Ridge, in the south part of the Town of Wawarsing. Sam's Point Preserve is in Cragsmoor.

== History ==
Cragsmoor, originally named Evansville, was founded as an art colony in 1879, after being discovered by artists earlier in the decade. It was renamed to Cragsmoor in 1893.

Chetolah and the Cragsmoor Historic District are listed on the National Register of Historic Places.

The first transport arrived in 1871 and it was railway, which made the region more accessible for visitors. It also made it easy for food to be transported into the region.

== Geography ==
According to the United States Census Bureau, the CDP has a total area of 4.4 square miles (11 km^{2}), all land.

The center of town is about 1,800 feet (550 m) above sea level, much higher than neighboring communities such as Ellenville and Walker Valley.

As a whole, the hamlet has a wooded, rustic ambience. Most homes are rather modest and old, but sit on large lots with many tall shade trees. There are also many large undeveloped woodlots; thus, property values in Cragsmoor are higher than in the rest of Wawarsing. Other than the post office, there is no business district to speak of.

In 1996 the 3,620 acres (14.6 km^{2}) comprising much of the hamlet's center were added to the National Register of Historic Places as the Cragsmoor Historic District, due to buildings designed by Bert Goldsmith and Frederick S. Dellenbaugh.

The Long Path hiking trail passes through the center of town on its way to Sam's Point.

Bear Hill is to the southwest of the hamlet.

== Demographics ==
Historical population
| Census | Pop. | Note | %± |
|---|---|---|---|
| 2000 | 474 | | — |
| 2010 | 449 | | −5.3% |
| 2020 | 433 | | −3.6% |
U.S. Decennial Census

As of the census of 2000, there were 474 people, 189 households, and 137 families residing in the CDP. The population density was 108.5 inhabitants per square mile (41.9/km^{2}). There were 257 housing units at an average density of 58.8 units per square mile (22.7 units/km^{2}). The racial makeup of the CDP was 94.09% White, 0.84% Native American, 1.48% from other races, and 3.59% from two or more races. Hispanic or Latino of any race were 4.85% of the population.

There were 189 households, of which 29.6% had children under the age of 18 living with them, 59.3% were married couples living together, 8.5% had a female householder with no husband present, and 27.5% were non-families. 20.1% of all households were made up of individuals, and 9.0% had someone living alone who was 65 years of age or older. The average household size was 2.51 and the average family size was 2.92.

In the CDP, the population was spread out, with 23.2% under the age of 18, 5.5% from 18 to 24, 27.2% from 25 to 44, 31.6% from 45 to 64, and 12.4% who were 65 years of age or older. The median age was 40 years. For every 100 females, there were 100.8 males. For every 100 females age 18 and over, there were 96.8 males.

The median income for a household in the CDP was $64,500, and the median income for a family was $56,250. Males had a median income of $42,250 versus $55,556 for females. The per capita income for the CDP was $22,712. About 9.4% of families and 11.1% of the population were below the poverty line, including 19.1% of those under age 18 and none aged 65 or over.

== Education ==
The CDP is in the Ellenville Central School District.

== Notable people ==
- Edward Lamson Henry N.A., the painter of historical themes, lived in Cragsmoor and helped found an artist's colony.
- Charles Courtney Curran, the painter known for 19th century 'en plein air' figurative work, and later for portraits, visited in 1903 and later built a summer home at Cragsmoor.
- Dave Cockrum, X-Men illustrator lived here for much of the 1980s and 90s.
- Austa Densmore Sturdevant
- Gerald Kersh, the British novelist and short story writer lived here before his death in 1968.
