= Lefebvre =

Lefebvre (French: [ləfɛvʁ]; commonly /ləˈfiːvər/ in English-speaking countries, as well as /ləˈfeɪv/ or /ləˈfɛv/) is a common northern French surname. Alternative forms include Lefebvre, le Febvre, Le Febvre, Lefèbvre, le Fèbvre, Le Fèbvre, as well as the common variant Lefèvre (le Fèvre, Le Fèvre; anglicized Lefevre, le Fevre, Le Fevre, LeFevre, LeFever). Dialectal variants include Lefevere (Belgium), Lefebre, Lefeuvre (western France), and Lefébure (northern France and Normandy).

The name derives from faber, the Latin word for "craftsman", "worker"; used in Late Latin in Gaul to mean smith. In the Occitan and Arpitan extension area, the variation is Fabre, Favre, Faure, Favret, Favrette or Dufaure and in Corsica Fabri (cf. Italian Fabbri, Fabri). In Celtic-speaking Brittany, the corresponding name is Le Goff(ic), with the article le to translate Breton ar. Many northern French surnames (especially in Normandy) are used with the definite masculine article as a prefix (Lefebvre, Lefèvre; a more archaic spelling is Le Febvre), with the contracted masculine article as a prefix (Dufaure) in the south of France, or without article/prefix (Favre, Faure) in the south of France, but the meaning is the same.

For Anglophone purposes, the name has evolved, especially in the United States and Anglophone regions of Canada—mainly by Acadians, among whom it is also a common surname, yielding not only Lefevre and LeFever, but also Lafevre, Lafever, Lefavre, LeFave, LaFave, as well as other variant spellings. The English surname Feaver is also derived from Lefebvre.

== People ==
=== Lefebvre and variations ===
==== Lefebvre ====
- Alain Lefebvre (born 1947), French journalist
- Arlette Lefebvre (born 1947), Canadian child psychologist
- Arthur H. Lefebvre (1923–2003), research engineer and scientist
- Benjamin Lefebvre, American politician
- Benny Lefebvre (1912–1994), American athlete and sports coach
- Bernard Lefebvre (1929–1999), Canadian surgeon and director of Royal College of Physicians and Surgeons
- Bill Lefebvre (1915–2007), American baseball player, coach, and scout
- Camille Lefebvre (1831–1895), French Catholic missionary
- Catherine Lefebvre (curler) (born 1959), French curler
- Charles-Édouard Lefebvre (1843–1917), French composer
- Charles Lefebvre-Desnouettes (or Lefèbvre-Desnoëttes; 1773–1822), French peer and general
- Claude Lefebvre (artist) (1633–1675), French painter and engraver
- Claude Lefebvre (handballer) (born 1952), former Canadian handball player who competed in the 1976 Summer Olympics
- Claude Lefebvre (ice hockey) (born 1964), Canadian ice hockey player and coach
- Elsie Lefebvre (born 1979), Canadian politician from Quebec
- Émile Lefebvre, French playwright
- Éric Lefebvre (born 1971), Canadian politician from Quebec
- Eugène Lefebvre (1878–1909), French aviator, second person to be killed in an airplane crash
- François Joseph Lefebvre (1755–1820), French marshal during Napoleonic Wars, Duke of Gdańsk
- Frédéric Lefebvre (born 1963), French politician
- Georges Lefebvre (1874–1959), French historian
- Germaine Lefebvre (1933–1990), French actress professionally known as Capucine
- Guillaume Lefebvre (born 1981), Canadian ice hockey player
- Gustave Lefebvre (1879–1957), French Egyptologist
- Henri Lefebvre (1901–1991), French philosopher, sociologist, and intellectual
- Jean Lefebvre (1922–2004), French actor
- Jean Baptiste Lefebvre de Villebrune (1732–1809), French physician, philologist, and translator
- Jean Pierre Lefebvre (born 1941), Canadian filmmaker
- Jim Lefebvre (born 1942), American baseball player
- Joe Lefebvre (born 1956), American baseball player
- Jules Joseph Lefebvre (1836–1911), French painter
- Kristine Lefebvre, American lawyer and contestant on The Apprentice
- Louise-Rosalie Lefebvre (1751–1821), French actress, dancer, and singer
- Ludo Lefebvre (born 1971), French chef
- Loïc Lefebvre (born 1976), French chef
- Marcel Lefebvre (1905–1991), French Catholic archbishop
- René Lefebvre (1879–1944), French factory owner, active in the Resistance, father of Marcel
- Roland Lefebvre (born 1963), Dutch cricket player
- Sébastien Lefebvre, French-Canadian musician
- Ségolène Lefebvre (born 1993), French boxer
- Stéphane Lefebvre (born 1992), French rally driver
- Sylvain Lefebvre (born 1967), Canadian ice hockey player
- Tim Lefebvre (born 1968), American musician
- Vladimir Lefebvre, American mathematician

==== Lefèbvre ====
- André Lefèbvre (1894–1964), French automobile engineer
- Hippolyte-Jules Lefèbvre (1863–1935), French sculptor
- Joseph-Charles Lefèbvre (1892–1973), French Catholic archbishop

==== Le Febvre ====
- Charles-Hugues Le Febvre de Saint-Marc (1698–1772), French playwright

=== Lefèvre and variations ===
==== Lefèvre ====
- Lefèvre family, French tapestry weavers, or one of its members; Lancelot, Pierre, Philip or Jean
- Jacques Lefèvre d'Étaples (c. 1455 – c. 1536), French theologian and a leading figure in French humanism
- Alain Lefèvre (1962–), French Canadian pianist and composer
- André Lefèvre (Scouting) (1887–1946), French Scouting notable
- André Joseph Lefèvre (1869–1929), French Minister of Defence
- Édouard Lefèvre (1839–1894), French entomologist
- Edwin Lefèvre (1871–1943), American journalist
- Eléonore Lefèvre (c. 1750–1818), French engraver
- Géo Lefèvre (1877–1961), French journalist creator of the Tour de France
- Françoise Lefèvre (born 1942), French writer
- Gustave Lefèvre (1831–1910), French Romantic composer
- Guy Lefèvre de la Boderie (1541–1598), French orientalist, Bible scholar and poet
- Jacques Lefèvre d'Étaples (also called Jacob Faber Stapulensis; c.1455–1536), French theologian and humanist
- Jacques Lefèvre (fencer) (1928–2024), French Olympic fencer
- Jean-Xavier Lefèvre (1763–1829), Swiss clarinetist and composer
- Jules Lefèvre (1863–1944), French biochemist and writer
- Laurent Lefèvre (born 1976), French cyclist
- Louis-Amédée Lefèvre (1890–1968), French Catholic prelate
- Pascal Lefèvre (born 1965), French javelin thrower
- Pauline Lefèvre-Utile (1830–1922) founded Lefèvre Utile (LU) company with her husband Jean-Romain Lefèvre in 1854.
- Raymond Lefèvre (1929–2008), French conductor of light music
- Robert Lefèvre (1755–1830), French painter
- Sophie Lefèvre (born 1981), French tennis player
- Théo Lefèvre (1914–1973), 39th Prime Minister of Belgium
- Wolfgang Lefèvre (1941–2025), German historian of science and academic

==== Le Fèvre / le Fèvre ====
- André le Fèvre, Dutch footballer at the 1924 Summer Olympics
- Anne Dacier (née Le Fèvre; 1654–1720), French scholar and translator of the classics
- Jacques Guarrigue-Lefèvre (born 1961), founder, owner and current president of Paris Élysée private club
- Jacques Le Fèvre (mid c. 17th–1716), French Roman Catholic theologian and controversialist
- Jean Le Fèvre (astronomer) (1652–1706), French astronomer and physicist
- Julia Marton-Lefèvre (born 1946), French conservationist
- Nicaise le Fèvre (also known as Nicasius le Febure; 1615–1669), French chemist and alchemist
- Tanneguy Le Fèvre (also known as Tanaquillus Faber; 1615–1672), French classical scholar

==== Lefevre ====
- Albert Lefevre (1873–1928), American psychologist
- Charles Lefevre (1893–1948), French flying ace
- Charles Shaw-Lefevre (politician) (1759–1823), born Charles Shaw, British Whig politician
- Charles Shaw-Lefevre, 1st Viscount Eversley (1794–1888), his son, Speaker of the House of Commons
- Ernesto Tisdel Lefevre (1876–1922), Panamanian politician
- George Shaw-Lefevre, 1st Baron Eversley (1831–1928), British Liberal Party politician
- John Shaw-Lefevre (1797–1879), British barrister, Whig politician and civil servant
- Rachelle Lefevre (born 1979), Canadian actress

==== LeFevre ====
- Adam LeFevre (born 1950), American character actor
- Carlene LeFevre, American competitive eater
- Eva LeFevre (1851–1948), American attorney
- Frank J. LeFevre (1874–1941), United States Representative from New York, son of Jacob Le Fever
- Jo-Anne LeFevre (born 1960), Canadian cognitive scientist
- Mylon LeFevre (1944–2023), American Christian music singer
- Rich LeFevre, American competitive eater
- Robert LeFevre (1911–1986), American businessman
- Ted LeFevre (born 1964), American theatrical set designer

==== Le Fevre / le Fevre ====
- Arthur Le Fevre (1887–1957), Australian golfer
- Benjamin Le Fevre (1838–1922), 19th century politician from Ohio
- Deidre Le Fevre, professor of education at University of Auckland
- George Le Fevre (1848–1891), surgeon and politician in colonial Australia
- Jay Le Fevre (1893–1970), United States Representative from New York
- Jean Le Fevre de Saint-Remy (sometimes Fèvre, c. 1395–1468), Burgundian chronicler and seigneur of Saint Remy 1420–1435
- Ulrik le Fevre (1946–2024), Danish soccer player and manager

=== Lefever and variations ===
==== Lefever ====
- Ernest W. Lefever (born 1919), American political theorist
- Joseph Lefever (born 1760), member of the United States House of Representatives
- Minard Lefever (born 1798), American architect

==== LeFever ====
- Jacob LeFever (1830–1905), American politician
- Daniel Myron LeFever (born 1835), American gun maker
- Jacob LeFever (born 1830), American Congressman from New York

==== Lafever ====
- Minard Lafever (1798–1854), American architect
- Minard Lafever Holman (1852–1925), American civil engineer

=== Other variations ===
==== Lafave ====
- Arthur J. Lafave, American founder of Lafave Newspaper Features
- Debra Lafave (b. 1980), American convicted sex offender
- Robert Lafave (b. 1927), American, WWII Veteran, Home Builder

==== LaFave ====
- Beau LaFave (b. 1992), member of the Michigan House of Representatives (108th district)
- Breck LaFave Bednar (1999–2014), English-American murder victim
- Jimmy LaFave (1955–2017), American singer-songwriter
- Kim LaFave (b. 1955), Canadian children's book illustrator
- Wayne LaFave (b. 1931), American legal scholar
- William LaFave (1929–2016), Wisconsin state legislator

==== La Fave ====
- John La Fave (b. 1949), American politician
- Reuben La Fave (1915–1995), Wisconsin state senator

==== Lafevre ====
- John A. Lafevre (1746–1818), American descendant of the New Paltz Huguenots

==== Le Favre ====
- Carrica Le Favre (b. 1850), American physical culturist

==== Lefebre ====
- Valentin Lefebre (1637–1677), Flemish painter, draughtsman and printmaker
- Edward A. Lefebre (1834–1911), American virtuosic saxophonist
- Joseph Oscar Lefebre Boulanger (1888–1958), Canadian politician and lawyer
- Bobby LeFebre (born 1982), American poet

==== Lefébure ====
- Louis James Alfred Lefébure-Wély (1817–1869), French organist and composer
- Eugène Lefébure (1838–1908), French Egyptologist
- Yvonne Lefébure (1898–1986), French pianist
- Estelle Lefébure (born 1966), French model

==== Le Febure ====
- Nicasius le Febure

==== Lefèrve ====
- Marius Lefèrve (1875–1958), Danish gymnast

==== LeFeuvere ====
- LeFeuvere, surname as known for two - or more - generations in Canada. (Original spelling likely Lefebvre but uncertain at the time of this writing). Only known surviving son at this time: Mark LeFeuvere.

==== Lefeuvre ====
- Louis-Albert Lefeuvre (1845–1924), French sculptor
- René Lefeuvre (1902–1988), French Luxemburgist

==== LeFeuvre ====
- Ian LeFeuvre, Canadian musician

==== Lefevere ====
- André Lefevere (1945–1996), Belgian-American translation theorist
- Patrick Lefevere (born 1955), Belgian cycling manager
- Peter Paul Lefevere (1804–1869), Belgian-American Catholic bishop

=== As a given name ===
- Lefevre James Cranstone (1822–1893), English artist

== Other uses ==
- LeFeuvre Scarp, elevation in Antarctica
- Le Fèvre Indian War
- Lefevre Peninsula
- The LeFevres (also called The Singing LeFevres), American Southern gospel singing group
- Lefèvre-Utile, French biscuit manufacturer

== See also ==
- Fevre Dream, a 1982 vampire novel by George R. R. Martin
