= Gardiner Town Hall =

- U.S. National Register of Historic Places
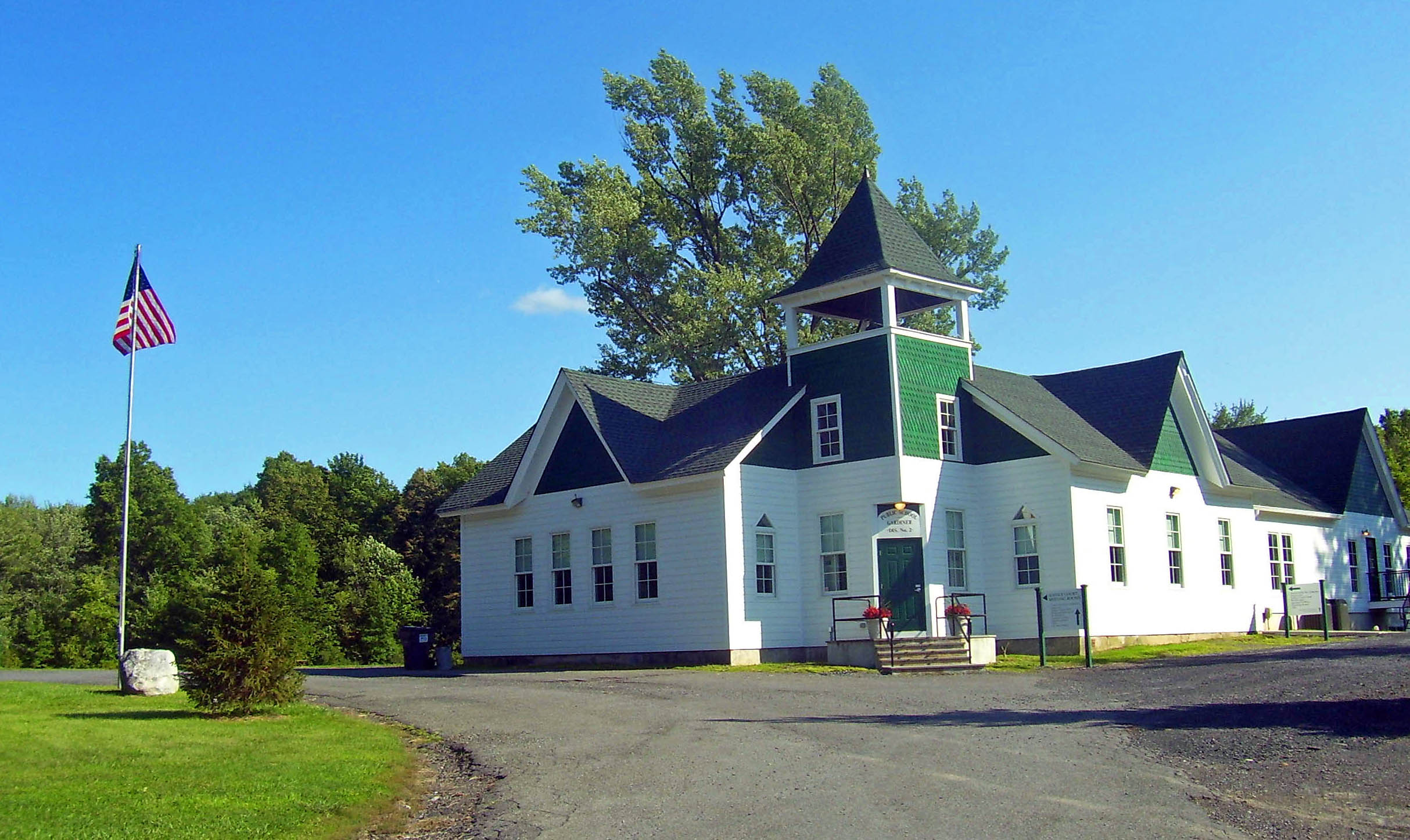
- Building in 2007
- Location: Gardiner, NY
- Nearest city: Poughkeepsie
- Coordinates: 41°40′43″N 74°08′59″W
- Area: less than one acre
- Built: 1875
- Architectural style: Queen Anne
- NRHP reference No.: 00001423
- Added to NRHP: November 22, 2000

The Town of Gardiner, in Ulster County, New York, United States uses the former Gardiner Schoolhouse as its town hall. It is located on US 44/NY 55 at the east end of the hamlet of Gardiner, and houses all the departments of town government, the town court and a branch office of the New York State Police. It is built in the Queen Anne style, painted green and white.

The building began life as a one-room schoolhouse rolled into the hamlet on logs in 1875. Fifty years later it was one of the few buildings to survive a fire that destroyed many other buildings in the community. It remained in use as a school, expanded to two rooms, until 1981.

The town began using it shortly afterwards, but it served mainly as a meeting place for the town board. Other offices were housed elsewhere in the town, often at the firehouse across the road and an office plaza downtown. In 2000 it was added to the National Register of Historic Places, and the town began to seriously consider renovating and expanding it. Some residents did not believe that was necessary, and helped defeat a $1.5 million expansion plan in a March 2001 vote. A vote later that year limited the town to $850,000 for any renovation or construction.

Three years later, a new town supervisor, Carl Zatz, initiated a project to renovate and expand the building. It caused some controversy when other town officials and residents publicly expressed doubts that the work could be done for the minimal costs Zatz claimed it would. It was completed for what Zatz's Democratic Party says was less than budgeted. Republican opponents, however, criticized him for destroying the school's outhouse in the process.

== See also ==
- National Register of Historic Places listings in Ulster County, New York
