= Thomas Joseph Lamy =

Belgian Biblical scholar and Orientalist

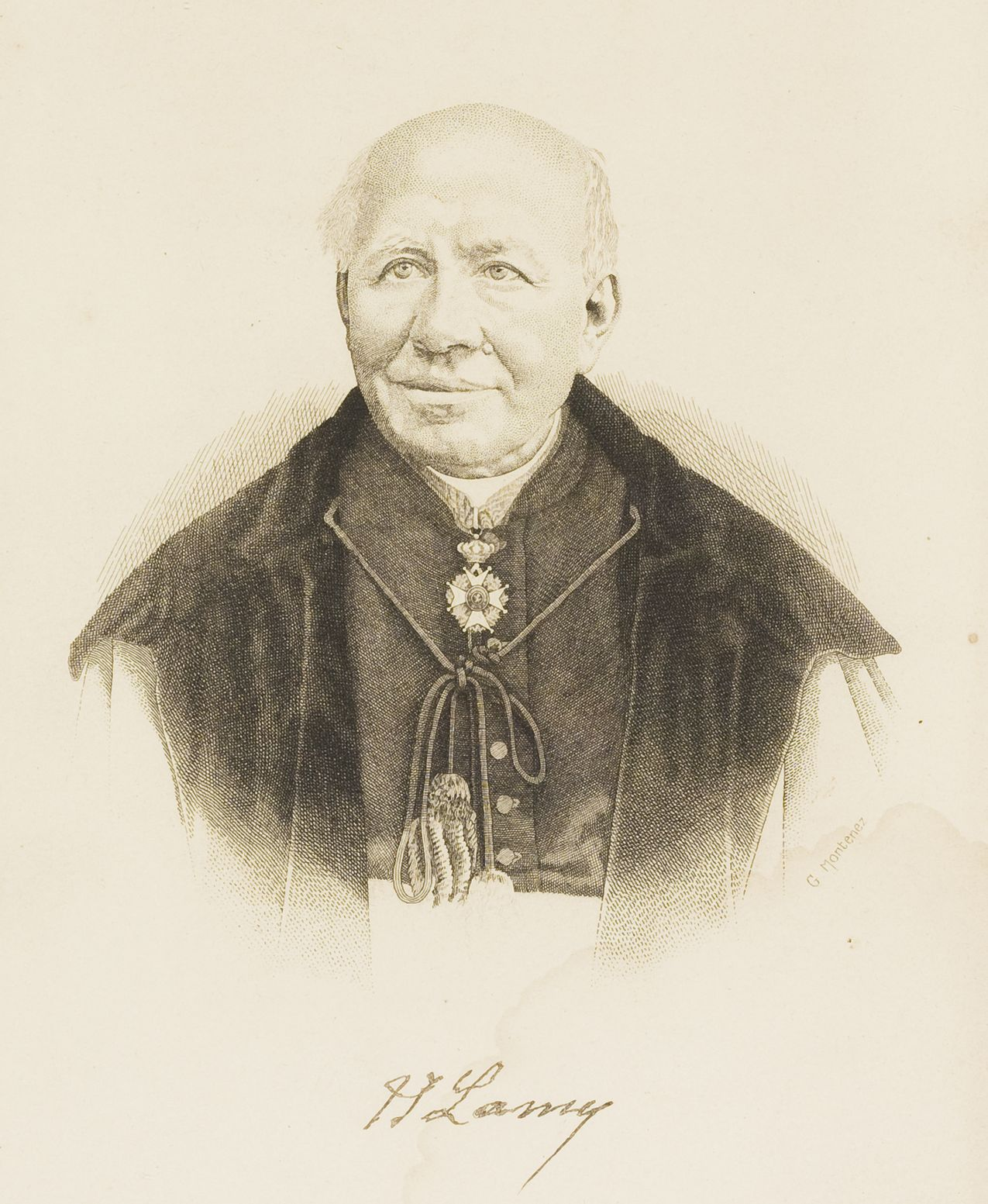
Thomas Joseph Lamy

Thomas Joseph Lamy (Ohey, Belgium, 27 January 1827 – Leuven, 30 July 1907) was a Belgian Biblical scholar and Orientalist.

== Biography ==
Lamy was ordained a priest in 1853 after completing his studies at Floreffe and at the seminary of Namur, he entered the Catholic University of Leuven and received from his professors, Ian Theodor Beelen, the distinguished exegete and orientalist, and Lefebre, who was well versed in positive theology, his impulse towards Biblical, Oriental, and patristic studies. He obtained the degree of Doctor of Theology in 1859.

Lamy's career as professor at Leuven began in 1858 and continued uninterrupted till the year 1900, comprising courses in Hebrew, Syriac, introduction to Sacred Scripture, and exegesis. Lamy succeeded Beelen on the latter's retirement in 1875.

Besides his professorial labors, Lamy served his university for thirty years as president of the College Marie Thérèse. He received many honors from learned societies and from his country; he was made domestic prelate (1885) by Leo XIII, and member of the Biblical Commission (1903) by Pius X.

Lamy died at the age of eighty.

== Works ==
Lamy's voluminous writings are listed in the bibliography of the university down to 1905, under one hundred and fifty-eight entries. His most valuable contributions to learning took the form of editions of many previously unpublished Syriac writings, notably his collection in six volumes of St. Ephraem's hymns and discourses, under the title "Sancti Ephraemi Syri Hymni et Sermones", and his edition of the "Chronicon Ecclesiasticum" of Bar Hebraeus. His editions of text are marred by numerous errors, chiefly typographical.

Lamy is most widely known by his "Introductio in Sacram Scripturam", in 2 volumes, which ran to six editions, an erudite collection of materials valuable in their day. Of his commentaries the most noted are his Latin commentary on Genesis, in 2 vols. (2nd ed., 1883–84), and his French commentary on the Apocalypse (1893–1894).

Neither in his introduction nor in his commentaries did Lamy grapple with the difficulties of the day; his ideas, acquired in the sixth decade of the nineteenth century, remained unmodified till the end. His "Introduction" passed almost unchanged through six editions. Lamy's numerous articles show his great devotion to the Church, to his university, and to his country, as well as a marked predilection for Biblical and patristic studies.

Lamy was engaged in the revision and annotation of a French translation of the Bible.
