= Beelen (surname) =

Beelen is a surname. Notable people with the surname include:

- Giel Beelen (born 1977), Dutch radio DJ and presenter
- Ian Theodor Beelen (1807–1884), Dutch exegete and orientalist
- Thomas Beelen (born 2001), Dutch footballer
