= Tuthilltown Gristmill =

- U.S. National Register of Historic Places
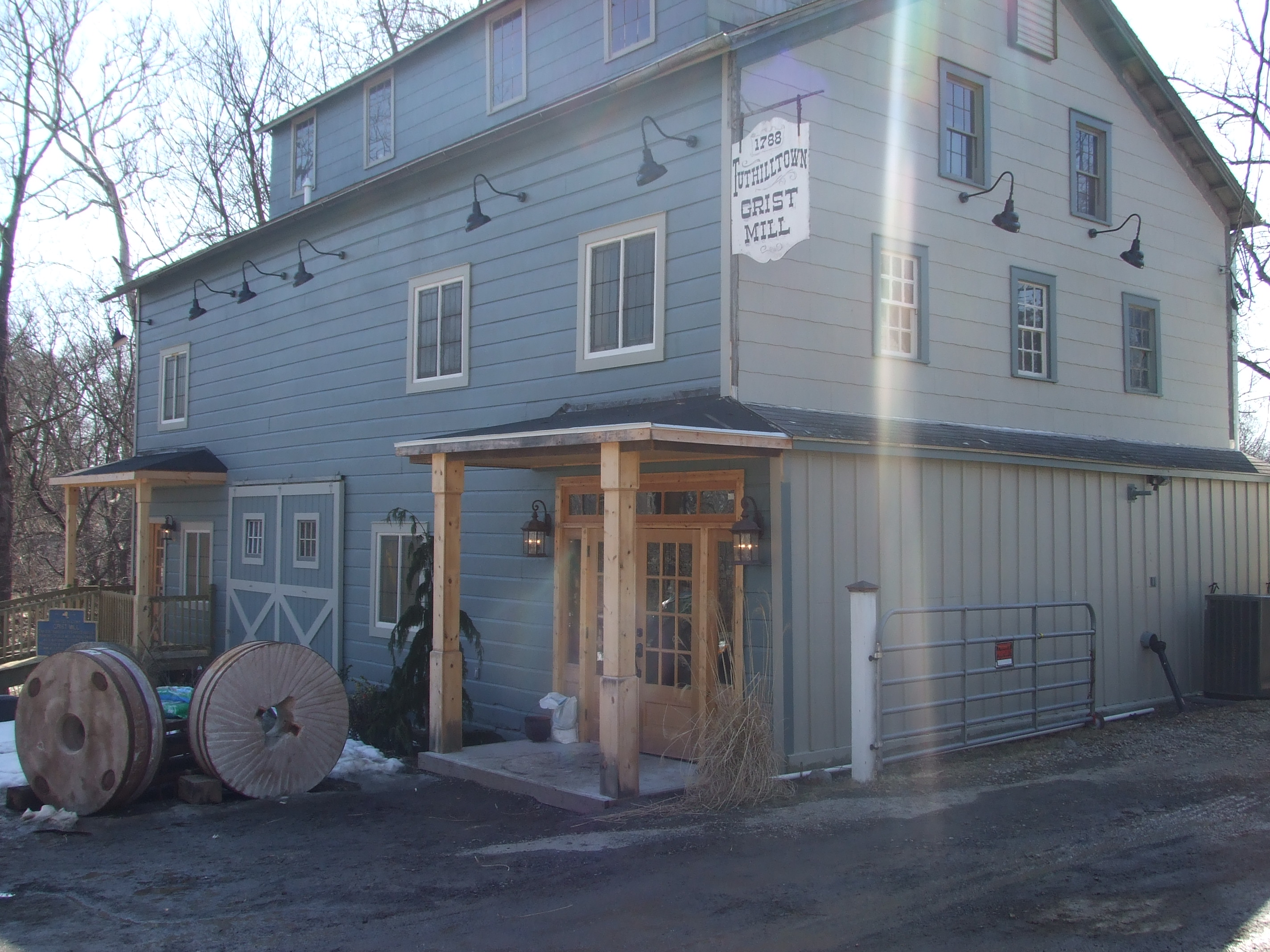
- North elevation and East profile of main building, 2010

- Location within New York Location within the United States
- Location: Gardiner, NY
- Nearest city: Poughkeepsie
- Coordinates: 41°41′09″N 74°10′35″W
- Area: 1.4 acres (0.57 ha)
- Built: 1788
- NRHP reference No.: 82003409
- Added to NRHP: June 14, 1982

The Tuthilltown Gristmill is located off Albany Post Road (Ulster County Route 9) in Gardiner, New York, United States. It was built in 1788, as the National Register reports, and has been expanded several times since.

Until recently it was the oldest continuously operated grist mill in the state. It was added to the National Register of Historic Places in 1982. Around that time it began producing kosher flour for use in baking matzoh. In 2007, its present owners began converting it into a restaurant TuthillHouse at the Mill opening in August, 2010.

== Property ==
The mill property is located at the end of Tuthilltown Road, which follows the west bank of the Shawangunk for a short distance from Albany Post Road just south of its intersection with US 44/NY 55. The stream is to its east, with the neighboring area being a combination of woodlots and fields, and directly adjacent to the first Whiskey Distillery in New York since Prohibition. Tuthilltown Spirits previously owned the Grist Mill, and carries its name. The Erenzo family and Tuthilltown Distillery has recently assumed management responsibilities for the restaurant. Sale of the Grist Mill back to the Erenzo family, is in process and should be completed by September 2014. This will once again return the Tuthilltown property to its full historic size, incorporating the Distillery, the Mill, the Mill race, the dam, and the main house back into one property There are a few other houses on the street.

There are several outbuildings on the property. Most are of more recent construction or, if historic, have been modified extensively and no longer retain their historic integrity. The National Register listing includes two contributing properties besides the mill: its dam further up the Shawangunk and the 2,500 feet (760 m) right-of-way around the mill race between it and the main mill building.

The main building is a three-story frame structure on a fieldstone foundation. Its gabled roof has a clerestory monitor. Asbestos siding covers the original clapboard. A shed-roofed one-story addition to the south houses the mill store. Inside most of the original finishes and layout remain. Four runs of millstones are on the first floor, powered by a Leffel turbine. A concrete headrace delivers water to the turbine pit.

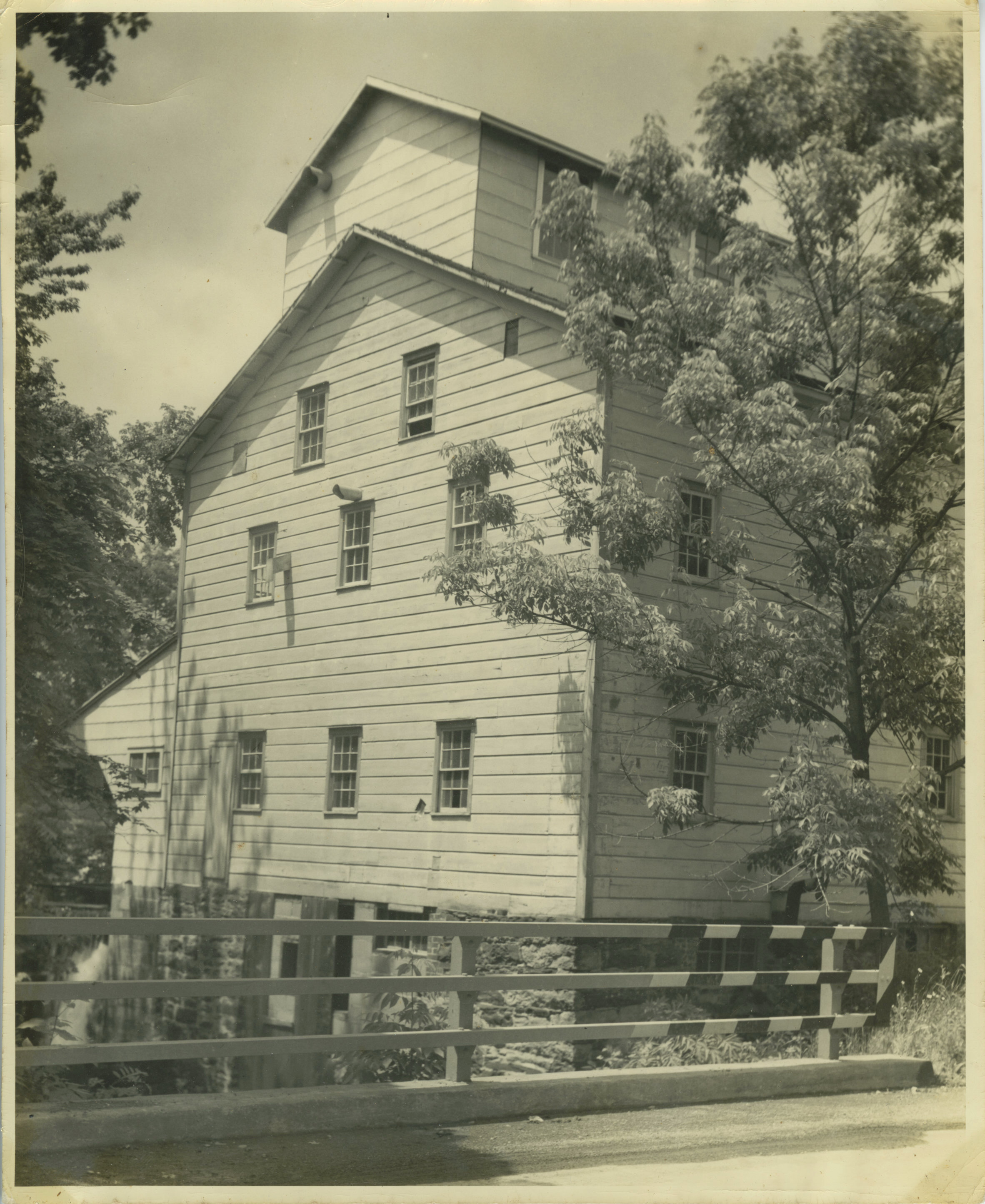
Tuthilltown Gristmill circa 1940

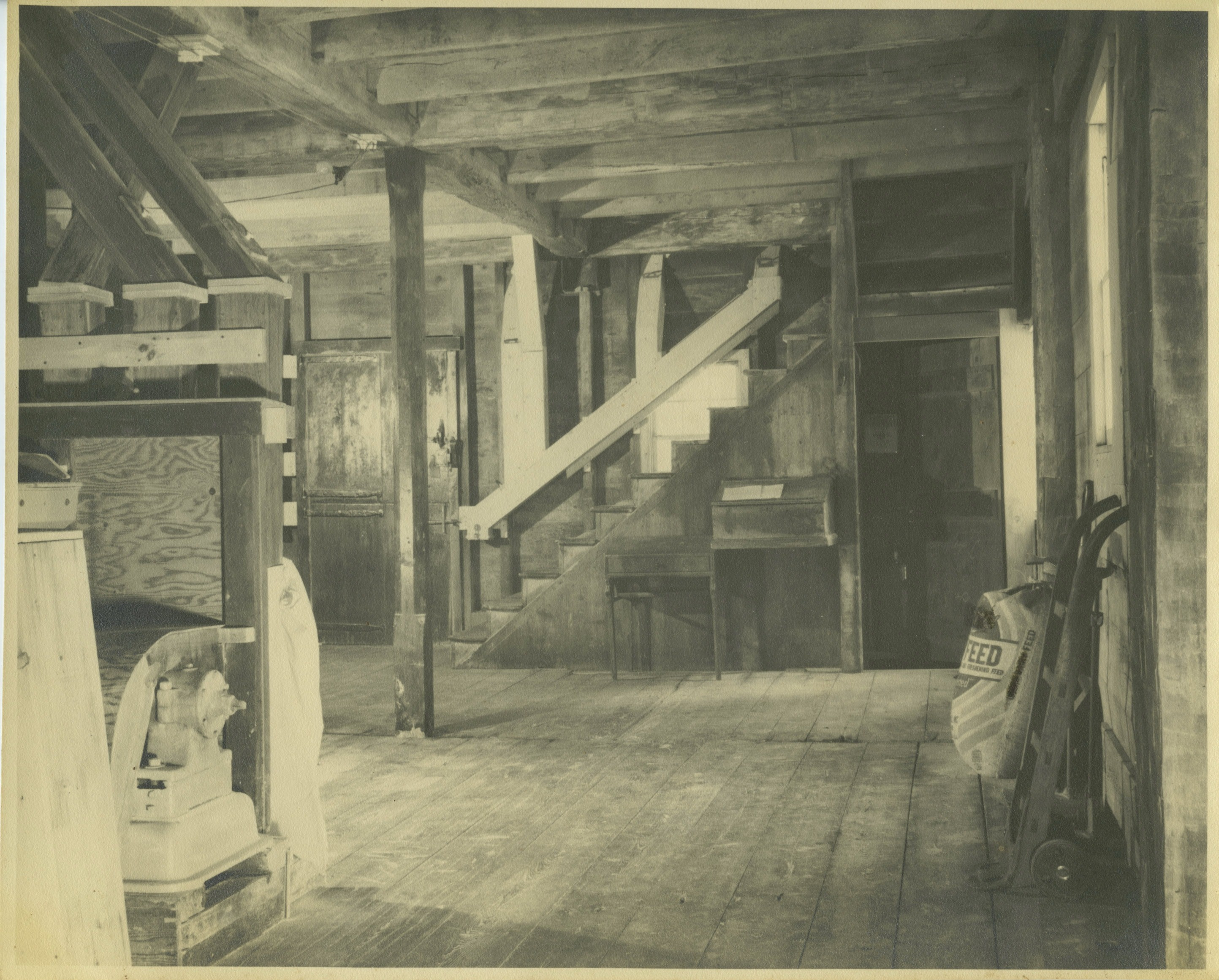
Tuthilltown Gristmill Interior circa 1940

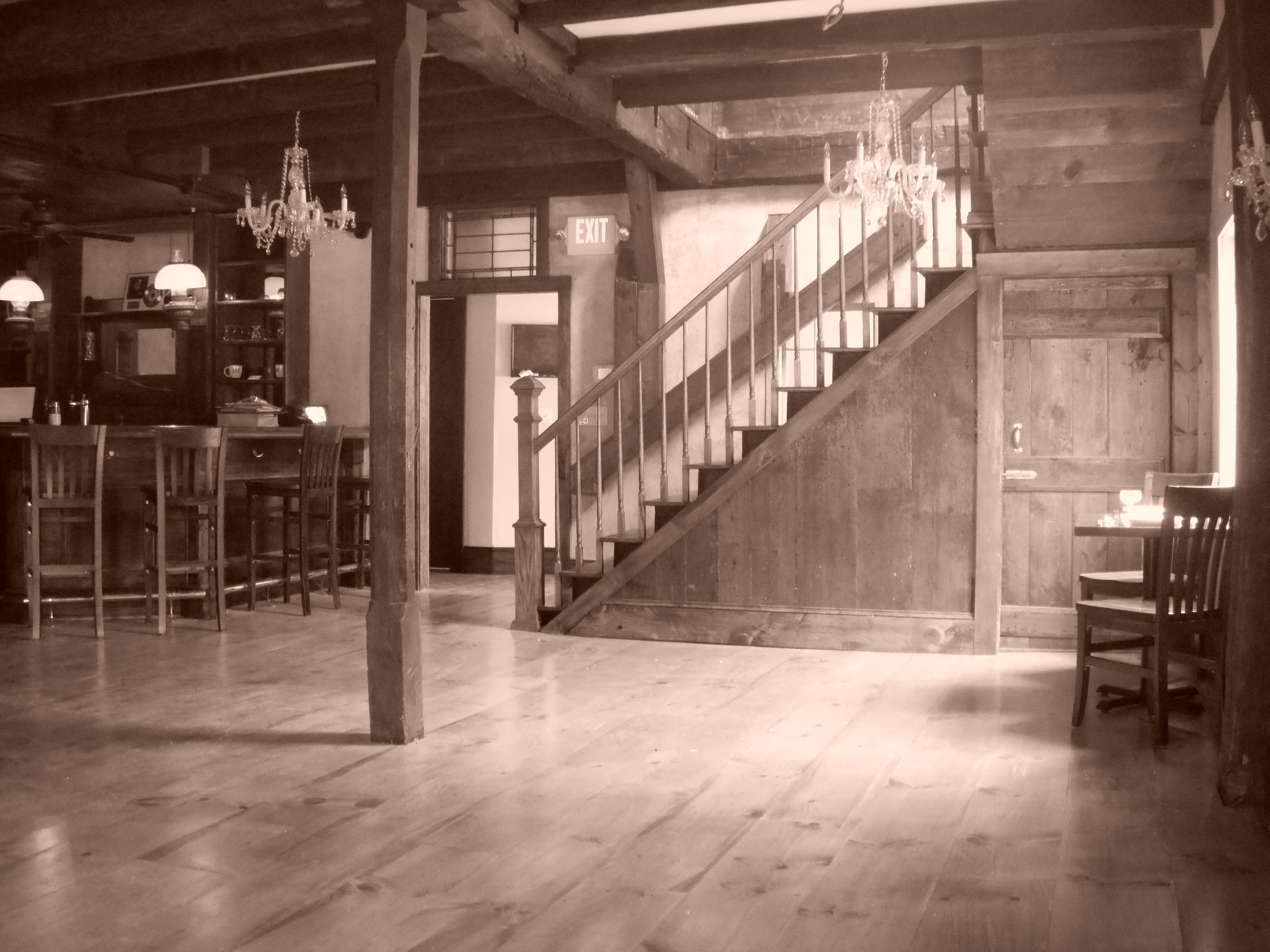
TuthillHouse at the Mill Interior 08/10

== History ==
Selah Tuthill built the mill on the Shawangunk Kill, immediately above the confluence with the Wallkill River, in 1788 when he was 18. The settlement that sprung up around it was the Town of Gardiner's commercial hub until the construction of the Wallkill Valley Railroad spurred the development of the hamlet of Gardiner.

Its original power source was an undershot wheel, later replaced by an overshot wheel. Between 1880 and 1910 much of its modern grinding technology, such as the vertical-shaft turbine drive system, was installed. In 1943 the addition was built, and another addition was incorporated into the mill building as its garage.

== Present ==
Currently, the Tuthilltown Gristmill is being renovated into TuthillHouse at the Mill Restaurant while maintaining as much integrity of the original structure as possible.

== See also ==
- National Register of Historic Places listings in Ulster County, New York
