= Lefebre =

Lefebre, Lefèbre, LeFebre, or Le Febre is a common surname, related to the French surname Lefebvre. Notable people with this surname include:

- Valentin Lefebre (1637–1677), Flemish painter, draughtsman and printmaker
- Edward A. Lefebre (1834–1911), American virtuosic saxophonist
- Joseph Oscar Lefebre Boulanger (1888–1958), Canadian politician and lawyer
- Bobby LeFebre (born 1982), American poet

== See also ==
- Lefèvre
- Lefébure
