= Johannes Decker Farm =

- U.S. National Register of Historic Places
- U.S. Historic district
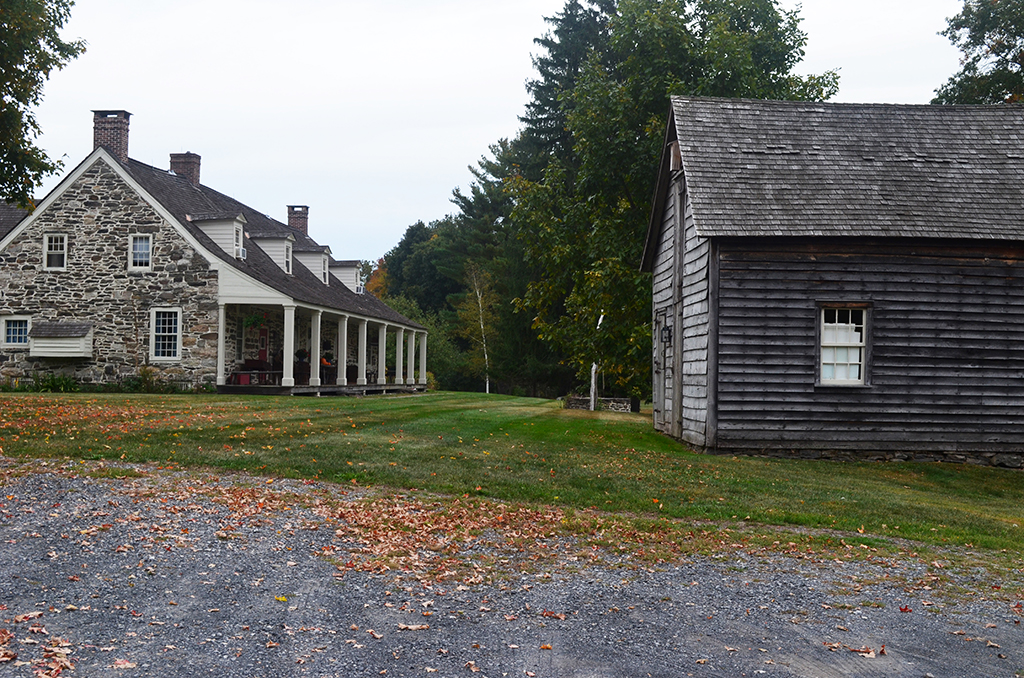
- Johannes Decker Farm, 2014

- Location within New York Location within the United States
- Nearest city: Gardiner, New York
- Coordinates: 41°38′33″N 74°14′3″W
- Area: 65 acres (26 ha)
- Built: 1725
- Architectural style: Dutch barn
- NRHP reference No.: 74001312
- Added to NRHP: March 05, 1974

Johannes Decker Farm is a historic farm complex and national historic district located at Gardiner in Ulster County, New York. The district includes three contributing buildings and one contributing structure. It consists of the main stone house dating from the 1720s, with three later 18th-century additions, a 1750s Dutch style barn, and a carriage and ice house also erected in the 18th century. The main stone house is 1 1/2-story rubble dwelling with a flared Flemish gable roof.

It was listed on the National Register of Historic Places in 1974.

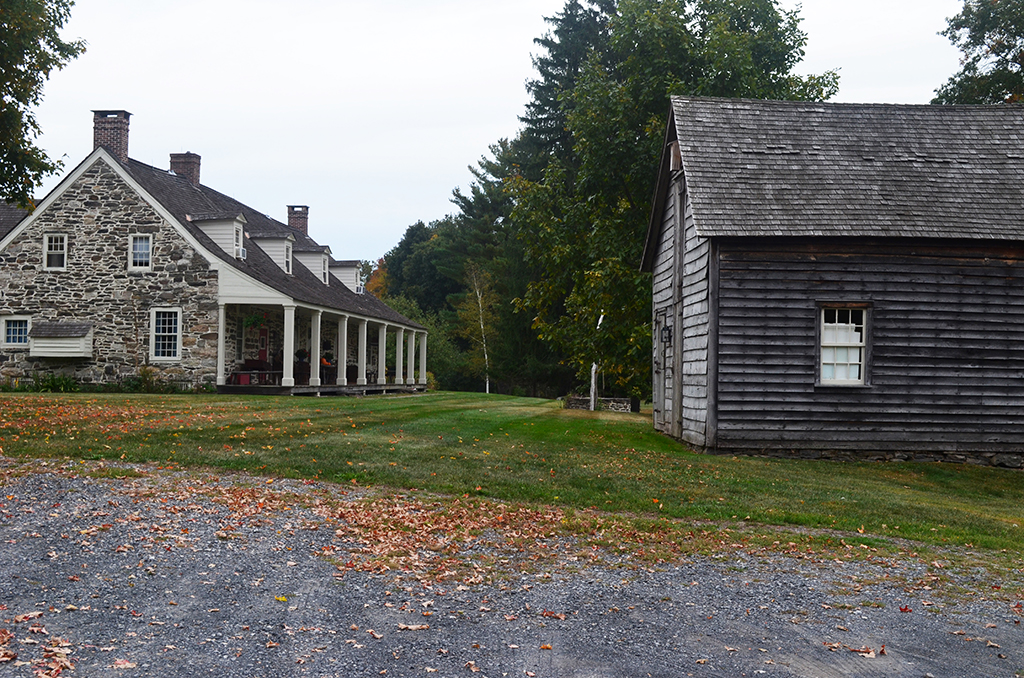
Johannes Decker Farm, Southwest of Gardiner on Red Mill Rd. and Shawangunk Kill Gardiner
