= Brykill Farm =

- U.S. National Register of Historic Places
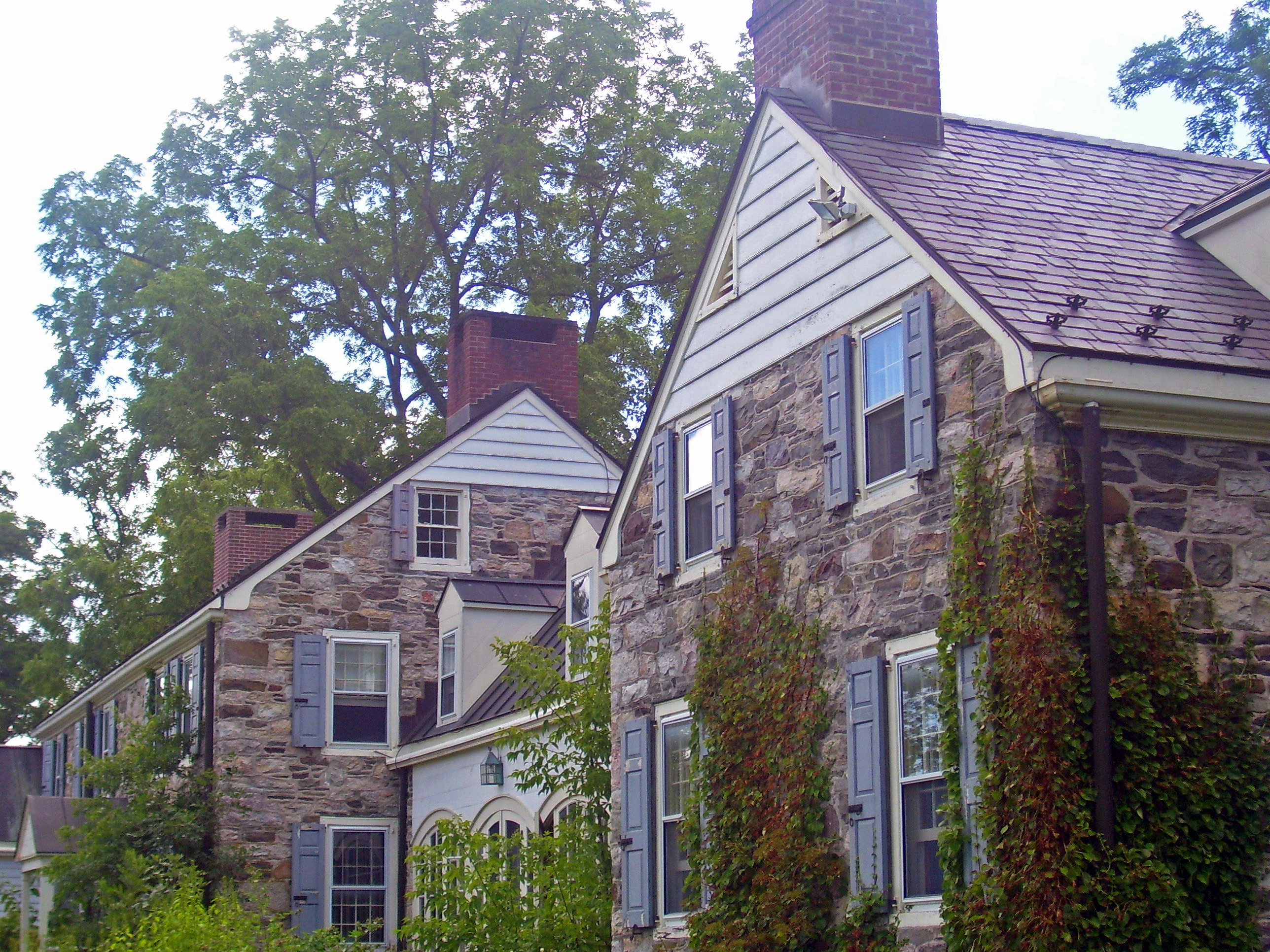
- North (front) elevation of house, including original 1724 house, 2008
- Location: Gardiner, NY
- Nearest city: Middletown
- Coordinates: 41°39′58″N 74°13′03″W
- Area: 180 acres (73 ha)
- Built: 1724; 1927
- Architect: Myron Teller
- Architectural style: Colonial Revival
- MPS: Shawangunk Valley MRA
- NRHP reference No.: 83001813
- Added to NRHP: September 26, 1983

Brykill Farm, originally just Brykill, is a commercial organic grass-fed beef ranch located on Bruynswick Road (Ulster County Route 7) in Gardiner, New York, United States. Formerly a country estate, its 180 acres (73 ha) have a panoramic view of the Shawangunks to the west.

First built as a small settler's home in 1724 and used as a court during the mid-19th century, it was expanded considerably in 1927 in a sympathetic style and material. In 1983 it was added to the National Register of Historic Places. It has been a beef ranch since 2000.

== History ==
The land where Brykill now stands was first granted to Gertrude Bruyn in 1694 by William III and Mary II, hence the name Bruynswick for the area. Later grants followed, and in 1720 an Isaac Smedes bought the land. Four years later he built a small stone house, the first of several structures that would be merged into today's main house. In 1736 he expanded it to the size of the main block.

From Smedes the house would pass into the hands of various members of the locally prominent Jansen and Hasbrouck families, remaining mostly unchanged. During the latter's ownership, around 1850, the large dining room may have been used as a local courtroom. The waterside gazebo was added in 1890.

In 1926, William Bruyn, a descendant of the original landowners, purchased the property for use as a country estate. He retained Kingston architectural firm Halvorsen and Teller to expand the property in a manner that preserved and reinforced its original aesthetics. This entailed adding onto the main block and connecting its components, and building the service complex.
