= Gardiner, New York =

Gardiner
- Town
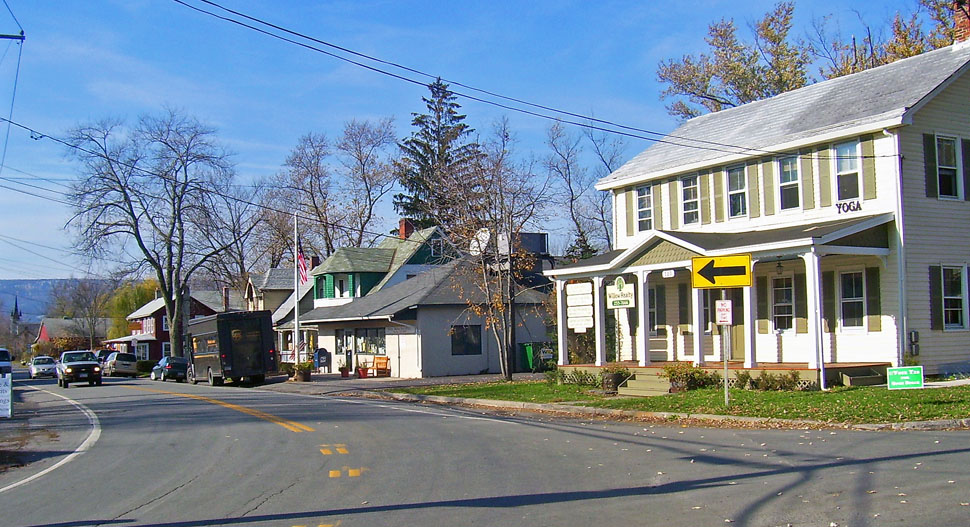
- Downtown Gardiner

- Location in Ulster County and the state of New York.

- Location of New York within the United States
- Coordinates: 41°40′48″N 74°9′4″W
- Country: United States
- State: New York
- Region: Hudson Valley
- County: Ulster

Area
  - Total: 43.95 sq mi (113.82 km^{2})
  - Land: 43.44 sq mi (112.50 km^{2})
  - Water: 0.51 sq mi (1.32 km^{2})

Population (2020)
  - Total: 5,610
  - Density: 129/sq mi (49.9/km^{2})
- Time zone: UTC-5 (Eastern (EST))
  - Summer (DST): UTC-4 (EDT)
- ZIP code: 12525 12561
- Area code: 845
- FIPS code: 36-111-28255

Gardiner is a town in the south-central part of Ulster County, New York, United States. The population was 5,610 at the 2020 census.

== History ==
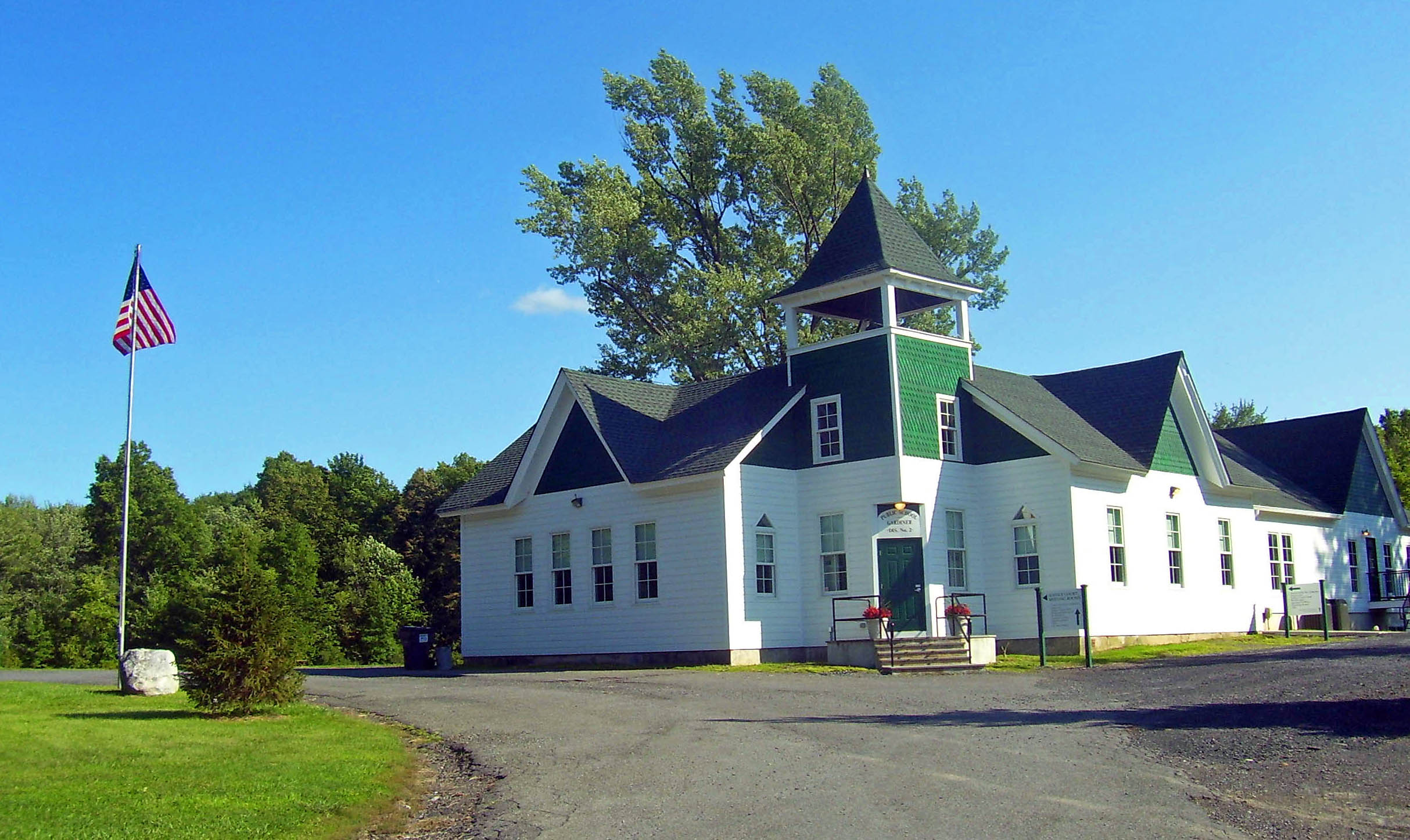
The town hall, a former schoolhouse on the National Register of Historic Places.

The first settlers in the region were Huguenots from France. Gardiner was created from parts of New Paltz, Rochester, and Denning by an act of the New York State Legislature on April 2, 1853. The first town meeting was on May 17, 1853. It was named for Lieutenant Governor Addison Gardiner. In 1925, a large fire destroyed a large part of Gardiner village.

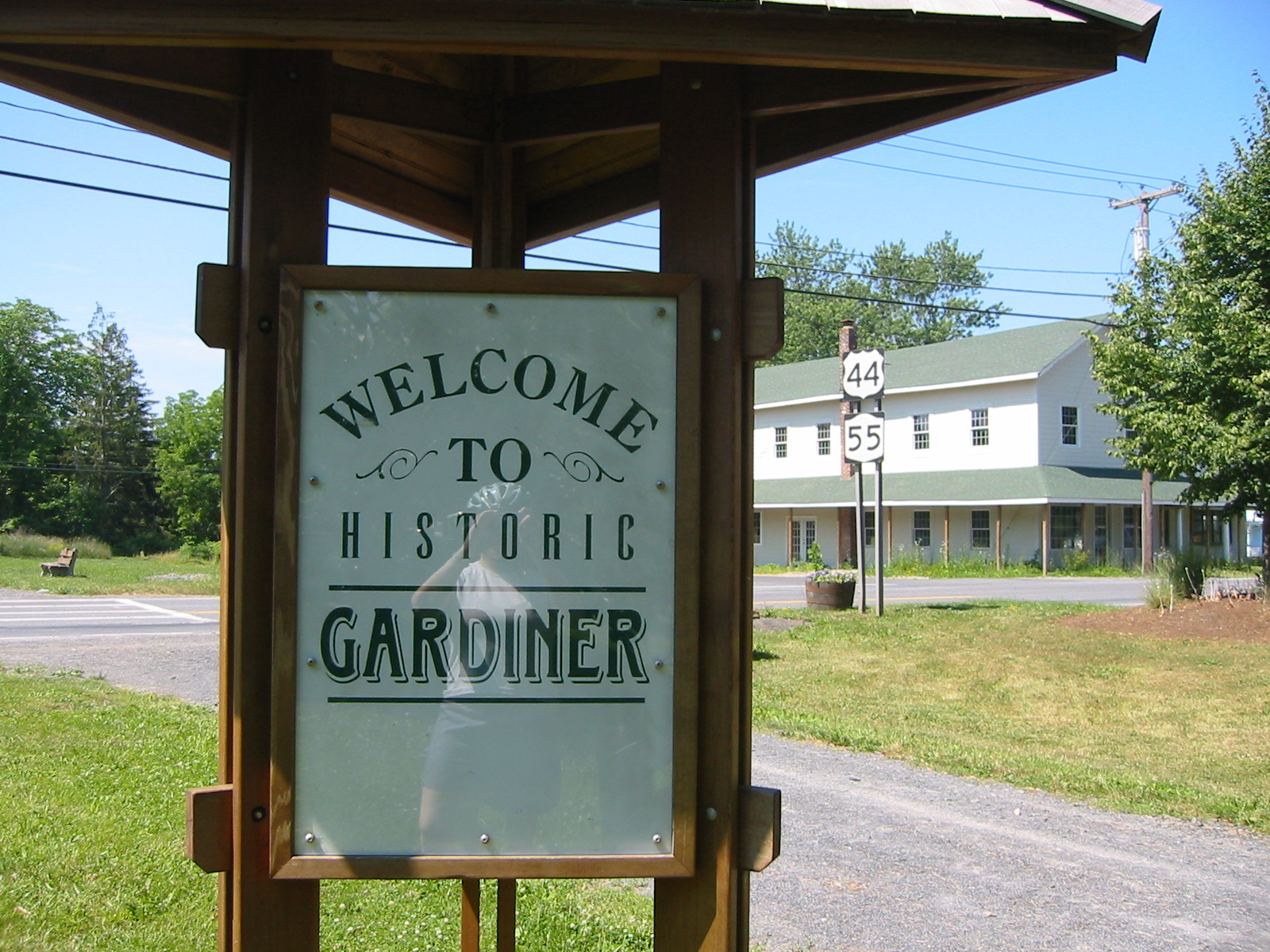
Wallkill Valley Rail Trail Crossing on Routes 44/55

The Wallkill Valley Rail Trail begins in southern Gardiner and runs along the abandoned Wallkill Valley Railroad rail corridor to New Paltz. Majestic Park is off Farmer's Turnpike, and features a disc golf course, skate park, playground, gazebo, and covered picnic area.

The Phillies Bridge Farm Project has a longstanding history in the area, being the oldest working farm in New York state. It is farmed using a community-supported agriculture model, and the nonprofit mission is expressed largely through food-justice initiatives.

The Peter Aldrich Homestead, Bevier House, Brykill, Johannes Decker Farm, Gardiner School, Jenkins-DuBois Farm and Mill Site, John A. Lafevre House and School, Abraham and Maria LeFevre House, Locust Lawn Estate, Trapps Mountain Hamlet Historic District, and Tuthilltown Gristmill are listed on the National Register of Historic Places.

=== Church of St. Charles Borromeo ===
Rev. James Mee was pastor of St. James Church in Milton. He also attended missions in Marlboro and Ireland Corners (an early name for Gardiner). In 1884 this was made a separate mission with Wallkill and New Paltz attached under the care of an English priest, Rev. Charles Browne. The Church of St. Charles Borromeo was dedicated at Gardiner. In 1886 Rev. Joseph L. Hoey was named pastor.

== Geography ==
Gardiner is at the center of Ulster County. It is bordered by Rochester to the north and west, to the north by New Paltz, to the west by Wawarsing, to the east by Plattekill, and to the south by Shawangunk.

According to the United States Census Bureau, the town has a total area of 44.9 square miles (116 km^{2}), of which 44.4 square miles (115 km^{2}) is land and 0.6 square miles (1.6 km^{2}) is water.

The Wallkill River flows from south to north through the center of the town. The Shawangunk Mountains are partly in the western part of the town.

== Climate ==
Climate data for Gardiner, New York
Month	Jan	Feb	Mar	Apr	May	Jun	Jul	Aug	Sep	Oct	Nov	Dec	Year
Record high °F (°C)	69 (21)	70 (21)	86 (30)	95 (35)	94 (34)	94 (34)	100 (38)	99 (37)	96 (36)	89 (32)	80 (27)	73 (23)	100 (38)
Mean daily maximum °F (°C)	34 (1)	37 (3)	46 (8)	58 (14)	70 (21)	78 (26)	83 (28)	81 (27)	73 (23)	62 (17)	50 (10)	39 (4)	59 (15)
Mean daily minimum °F (°C)	13 (−11)	15 (−9)	25 (−4)	36 (2)	46 (8)	55 (13)	59 (15)	58 (14)	49 (9)	37 (3)	29 (−2)	20 (−7)	37 (3)
Record low °F (°C)	−27 (−33)	−18 (−28)	−13 (−25)	12 (−11)	27 (−3)	33 (1)	41 (5)	35 (2)	27 (−3)	16 (−9)	4 (−16)	−14 (−26)	−27 (−33)
Average precipitation inches (mm)	3.24 (82)	2.56 (65)	3.57 (91)	3.85 (98)	4.62 (117)	4.29 (109)	4.25 (108)	3.73 (95)	4.09 (104)	3.33 (85)	3.75 (95)	3.31 (84)	44.59 (1,133)
Source: The Weather Channel

== Demographics ==
Historical population
Census	Pop.	Note	%±
1860	2,096		—
1870	1,991		−5.0%
1880	1,794		−9.9%
1890	1,703		−5.1%
1900	1,509		−11.4%
1910	2,779		84.2%
1920	1,088		−60.8%
1930	988		−9.2%
1940	1,317		33.3%
1950	1,289		−2.1%
1960	1,660		28.8%
1970	2,598		56.5%
1980	3,552		36.7%
1990	4,278		20.4%
2000	5,238		22.4%
2010	5,713		9.1%
2020	5,610		−1.8%
Sources: 1880–1890, 1900–1920, 1930–1950, 1960–1980, 1990, 2000 2020

At the time of the 2000 census, there were 5,238 people, 1,997 households, and 1,389 families residing in the town. The population density was 118.0 inhabitants per square mile (45.6/km^{2}). There were 2,255 housing units at an average density of 50.8 per square mile (19.6/km^{2}). The racial makeup of the town was 94.35% white, 1.76% black or African American, 0.13% Native American, 0.74% Asian, 0.04% Pacific Islander, 1.11% from other races, and 1.87% from two or more races. Hispanic or Latino of any race were 4.58% of the population.

There were 1,997 households, out of which 36.3% had children under the age of 18 living with them, 58.1% were married couples living together, 7.2% had a female householder with no husband present, and 30.4% were non-families. 21.6% of all households were made up of individuals, and 5.6% had someone living alone who was 65 years of age or older. The average household size was 2.60 and the average family size was 3.07.

In the town, the population was spread out, with 26.0% under the age of 18, 6.0% from 18 to 24, 32.3% from 25 to 44, 26.1% from 45 to 64, and 9.6% who were 65 years of age or older. The median age was 38 years. For every 100 females, there were 100.8 males. For every 100 females age 18 and over, there were 100.1 males.

The median income for a household in the town was $54,432, and the median income for a family was $62,750. Males had a median income of $40,964 versus $29,474 for females. The per capita income for the town was $25,091. About 4.7% of families and 7.4% of the population were below the poverty line, including 8.5% of those under age 18 and 4.3% of those age 65 or over.

== Communities and locations in Gardiner ==
- Benton Corners – a hamlet west of Gardiner village on Routes 44 and 55.
- Forest Glen – a hamlet in the northern part of the town, west of Jenkinstown.
- Ganahgot – a hamlet west of Gardiner village, Tuthill and the Wallkill River. The Shawangunk Kill joins the Wallkill River near this community.
- Gardiner – a hamlet located at the junctions of Routes 19 and 44–55.
- Ireland Corners – a hamlet east of Gardiner village at the junction of 44-55 and Route 208.
- Jenkinstown – a hamlet in the northeastern part of the town near the town line.
- Libertyville – a hamlet by the northern town line.
- Rutsonville – a hamlet near the southern town line on Route 7.
- Tuthill – a hamlet west of Gardiner village on Route 55, near the Wallkill River.
- Wallkill Camp – a hamlet in the northern part of the town.

== Education ==
The town is partly in New Paltz Central School District, and partly in Wallkill Central School District, with a small southwestern section in Pine Bush Central School District.

== Notable person ==
- Pat Ryan, U.S. representative and former Ulster County Executive
- Robert De Niro

== Bibliography ==
- Sylvester, Nathaniel Bartlett (1994) [1880]. History of Ulster County, New York, with Illustrations and Biographical Sketches of its Prominent Men and Pioneers: Part Second: History of the Towns of Ulster County. Philadelphia, PA: Everts & Peck. ISBN 978-1-55787-130-5.
