= Luigi Schiavonetti =

Italian engraver

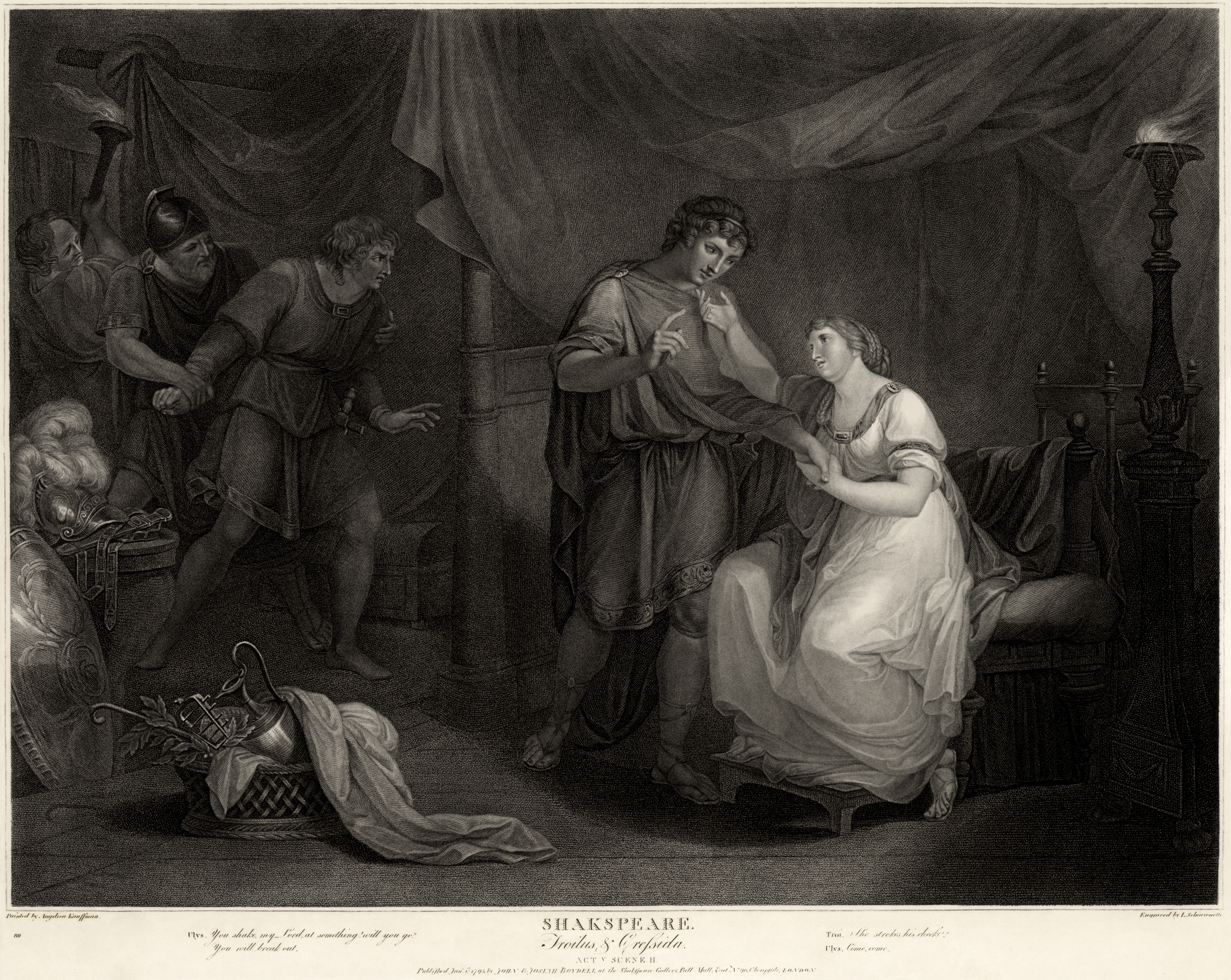
Troilus and Cressida, Act V, Scene II. Painted by Angelica Kauffman in 1789, and engraved by Luigi Schiavonetti for the Boydell Shakespeare Gallery's illustrated edition of Shakespeare in 1795.

Luigi Schiavonetti (1 April 1765 – 7 June 1810) was an Italian reproductive engraver and etcher.

== Life ==
Luigi Schiavonetti was born at Bassano in Venetia. He was the maternal nephew of Teodoro Viero. After having studied art for several years he was employed by Testolini, an engraver of very indifferent abilities, to execute imitations of Bartolozzi's works, which he passed off as his own. In 1790, Testolini was invited by Bartolozzi to join him in England, and, it having been discovered that Schiavonetti, who accompanied him, had executed the plates in question, he was employed by Bartolozzi and became an eminent engraver in both the line and the stipple manner. Among his early works are four plates of subjects from the French Revolution, after Peter Paul Benazech.

Schiavonetti engraved a drawing of Maria Cosway that her husband, the artist Richard Cosway, had drawn. He also engraved a portrait that Maria Cosway had commissioned that was the first portrait of Napoleon seen in Britain.

He also produced a "Mater Dolorosa" after Van Dyck, and Michelangelo's cartoon of the Battle of Cascina depicting the "Surprise of the Soldiers on the Banks of the Arno." From 1805 to 1808, he was engaged in etching William Blake's designs to Blair's Grave, which, with a portrait of the artist engraved by Schiavonetti after Thomas Phillips RA, were published in 1808. The etching of Stothard's "Canterbury Pilgrims" was one of his latest works, and on his death the plate was taken up by his brother Niccolo, and finally completed by James Heath.

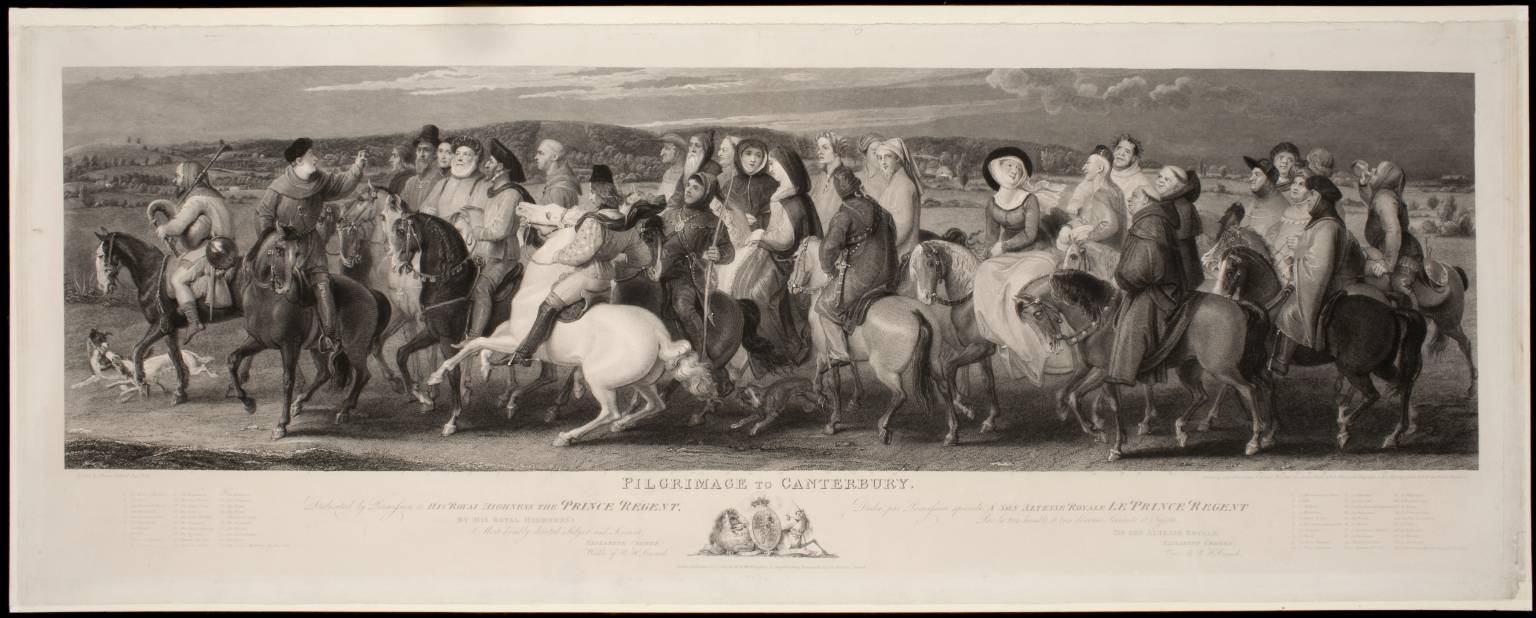
Engraving of a “Pilgrimage to Canterbury”, 1809-1817
