= Jenkins–DuBois Farm =

- Jenkins–DuBois Farm And Mill Site
- U.S. National Register of Historic Places
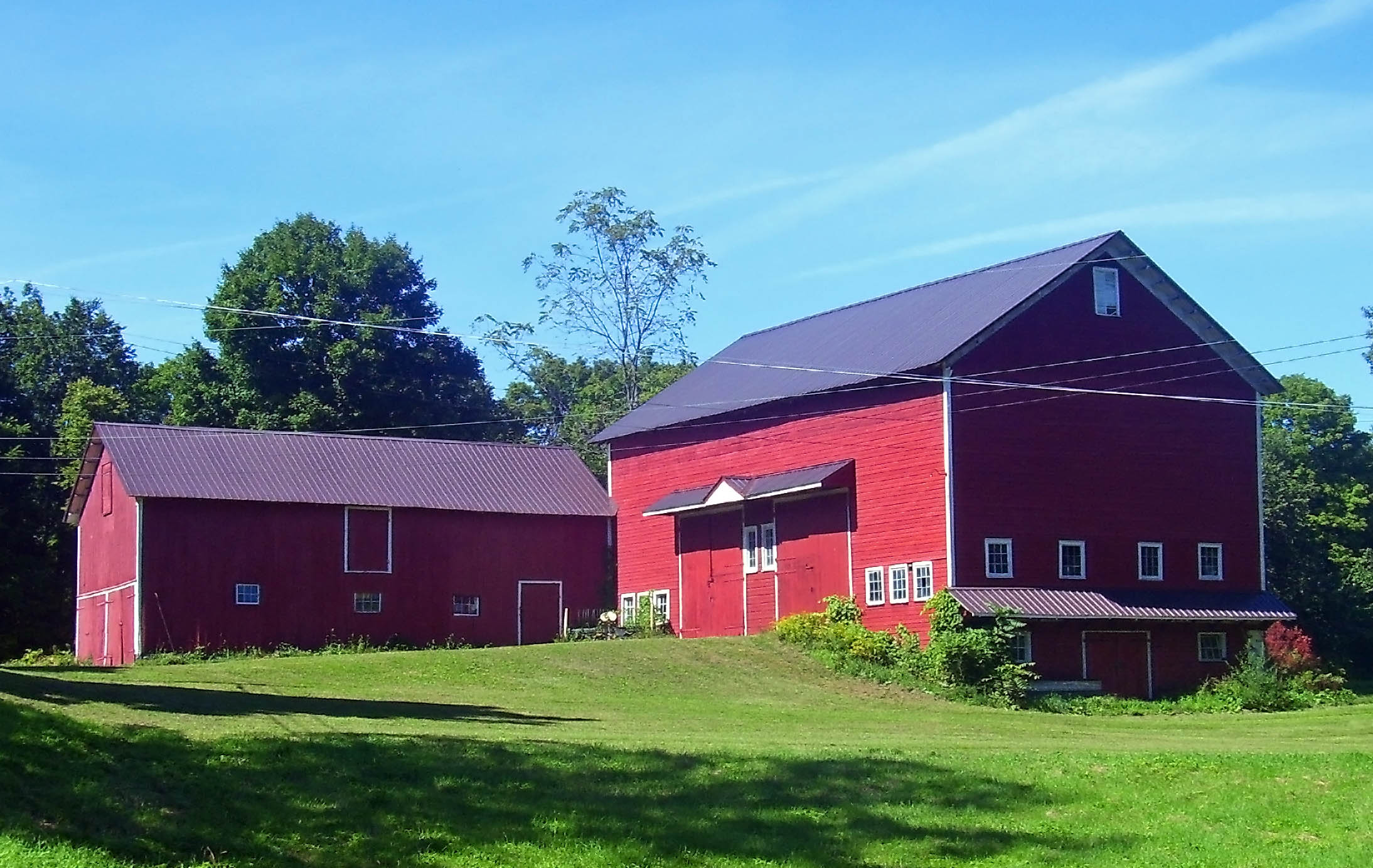
- Barns in 2007

- Location within New York Location within the United States
- Location: Gardiner, NY
- Nearest city: Poughkeepsie
- Coordinates: 41°41′54″N 74°06′45″W
- Area: 107.6 acres (43.5 ha)
- Built: 1793
- NRHP reference No.: 01000581
- Added to NRHP: May 30, 2001

The Jenkins–DuBois Farm and Mill Site is located along Jenkinstown Road in Gardiner, Ulster County, New York, United States. It was started by settler Lambert Jenkins in 1793 with a stone house and mills on land part of the original Huguenot Patent owned by Louis DuBois of nearby New Paltz. The Jenkins–DuBois descendants still live on the land today.

It was added to the National Register of Historic Places in 2001.
