= Abraham and Maria LeFevre House =

Historic house in New York, United States

- U.S. National Register of Historic Places
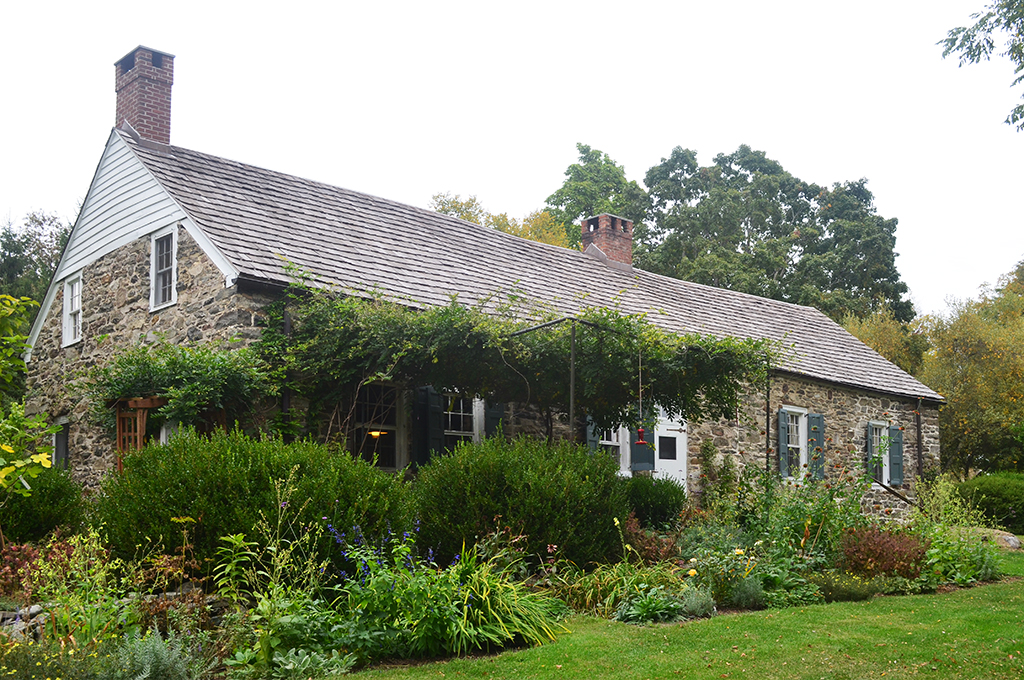

- Location within New York Location within the United States
- Location: 56 Forest Glen Rd., Gardiner, New York
- Coordinates: 41°41′56″N 74°7′48″W
- Area: 4.6 acres (1.9 ha)
- Built: 1742
- Architectural style: Colonial
- NRHP reference No.: 06000645
- Added to NRHP: July 28, 2006

Abraham and Maria LeFevre House is a historic home located at Gardiner in Ulster County, New York. It is a long, rectangular 1 1/2-story stone dwelling capped by a steep gable roof. It was built in three stages between 1742 and 1798.

It was listed on the National Register of Historic Places in 2006.

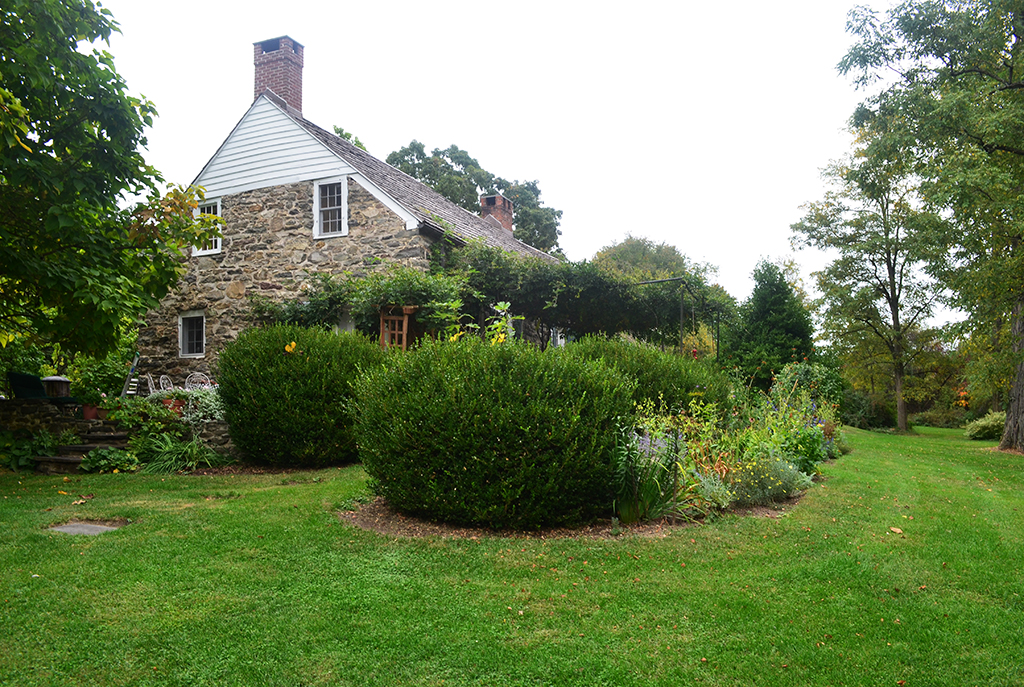
Abraham and Maria LeFevre House, 56 Forest Glen Rd. Gardiner

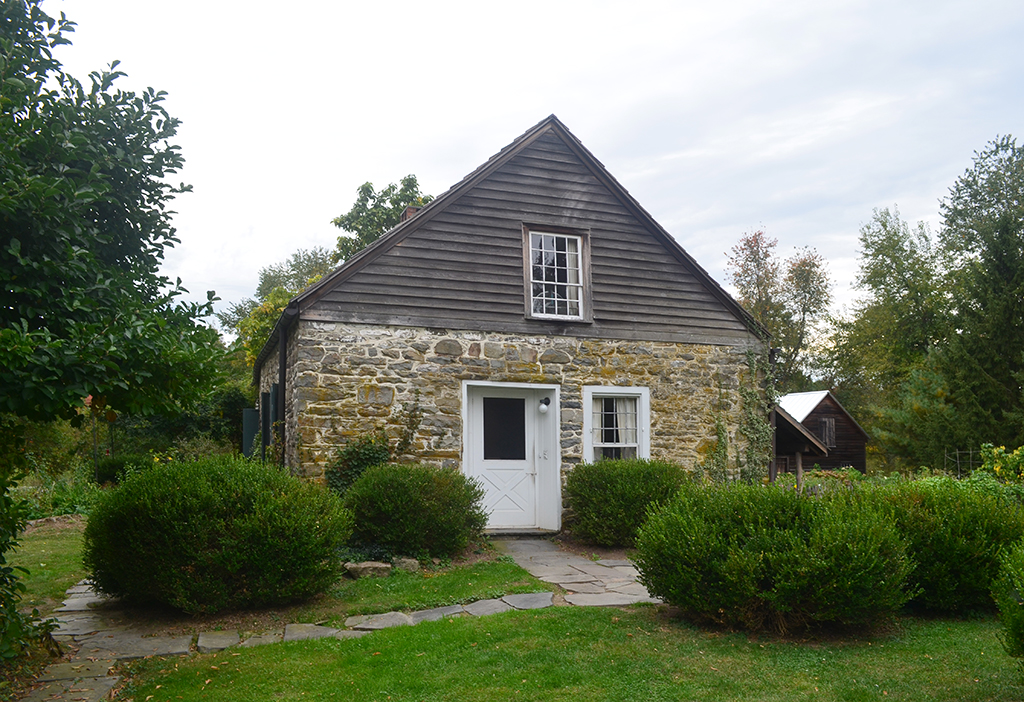
Abraham and Maria LeFevre House, 56 Forest Glen Rd. Gardiner

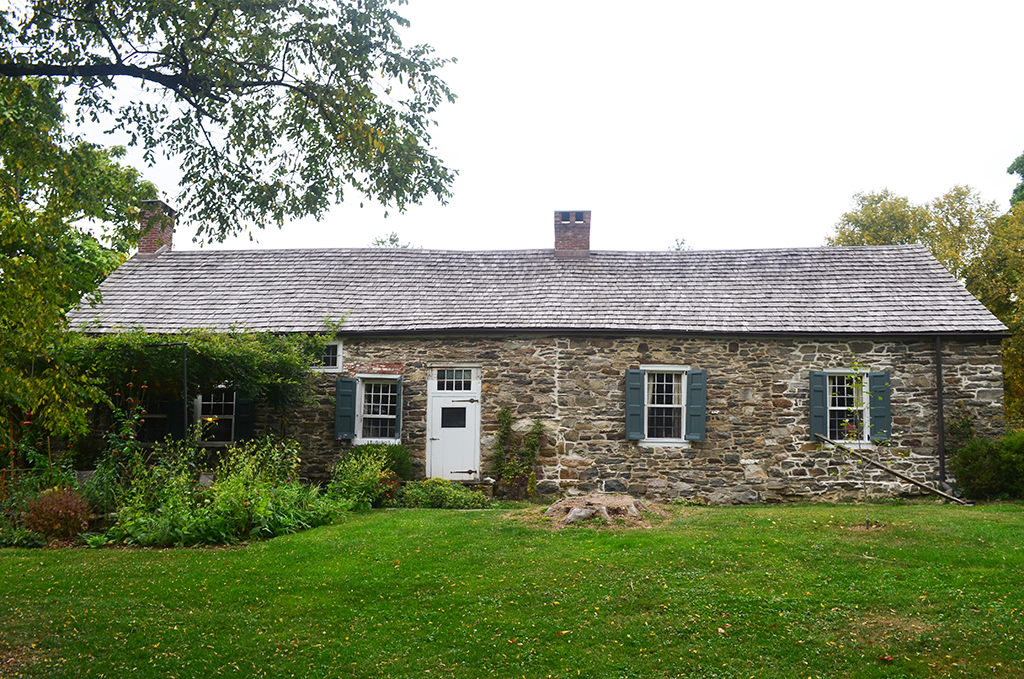
Abraham and Maria LeFevre House, 56 Forest Glen Rd. Gardiner
