= Peter Aldrich Homestead =

Historic house in New York, United States

- U.S. National Register of Historic Places
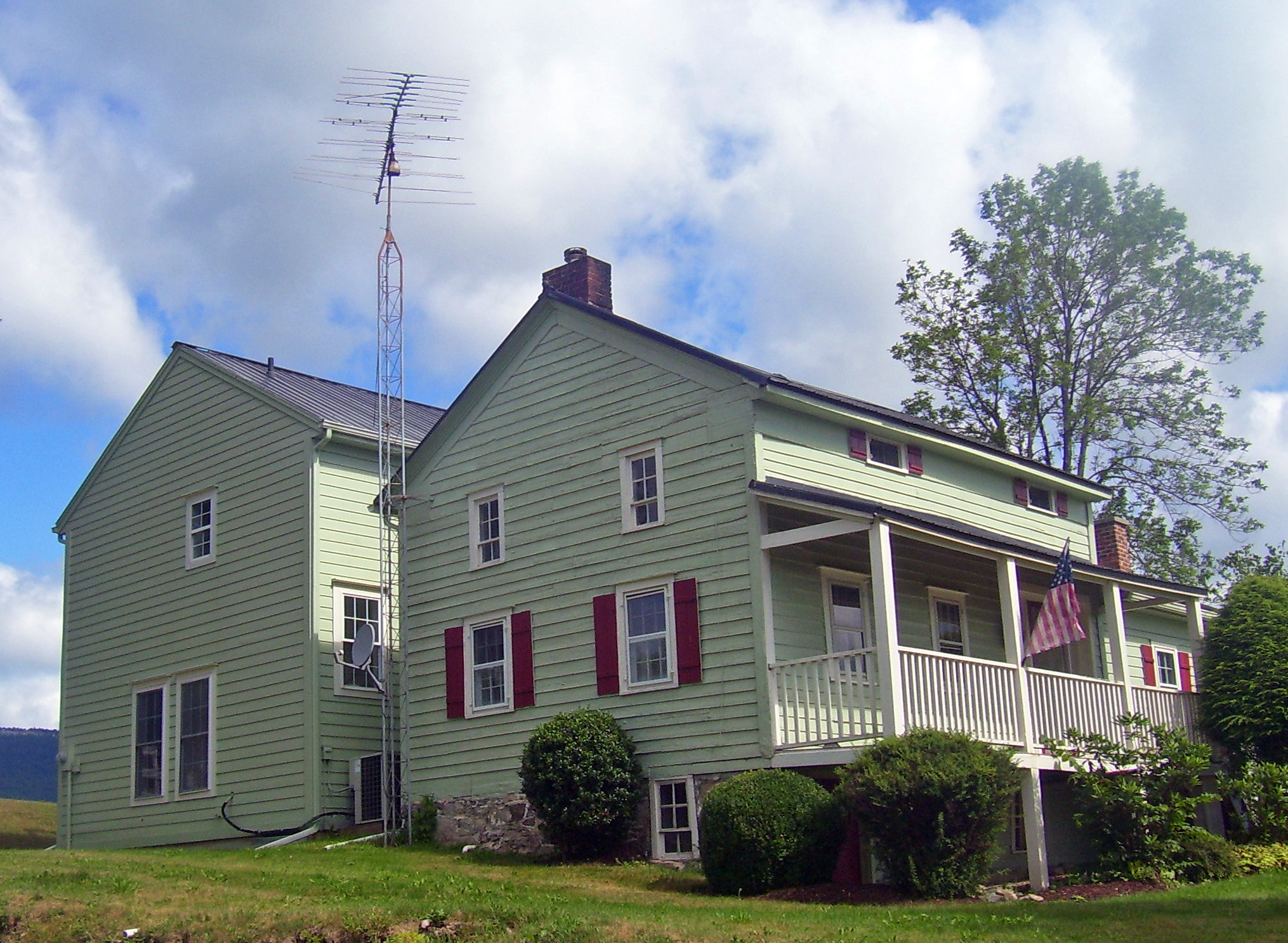
- Peter Aldrich Homestead, Gardiner, NY, USA

- Location within New York Location within the United States
- Location: 168 Decker Rd., Gardiner, New York
- Coordinates: 41°40′11″N 74°15′24″W
- Area: 15.8 acres (6.4 ha)
- Built: 1750
- MPS: Shawangunk Valley MRA
- NRHP reference No.: 83001811
- Added to NRHP: September 26, 1983

Peter Aldrich Homestead is a historic home located at Gardiner in Ulster County, New York. It is a 1 1/2-story frame dwelling built in stages, with the oldest section dating to about 1750. The interior features notable Federal period decorative woodwork.

It was listed on the National Register of Historic Places in 1983.
