= Bevier House =

Historic house in New York, United States

- U.S. National Register of Historic Places
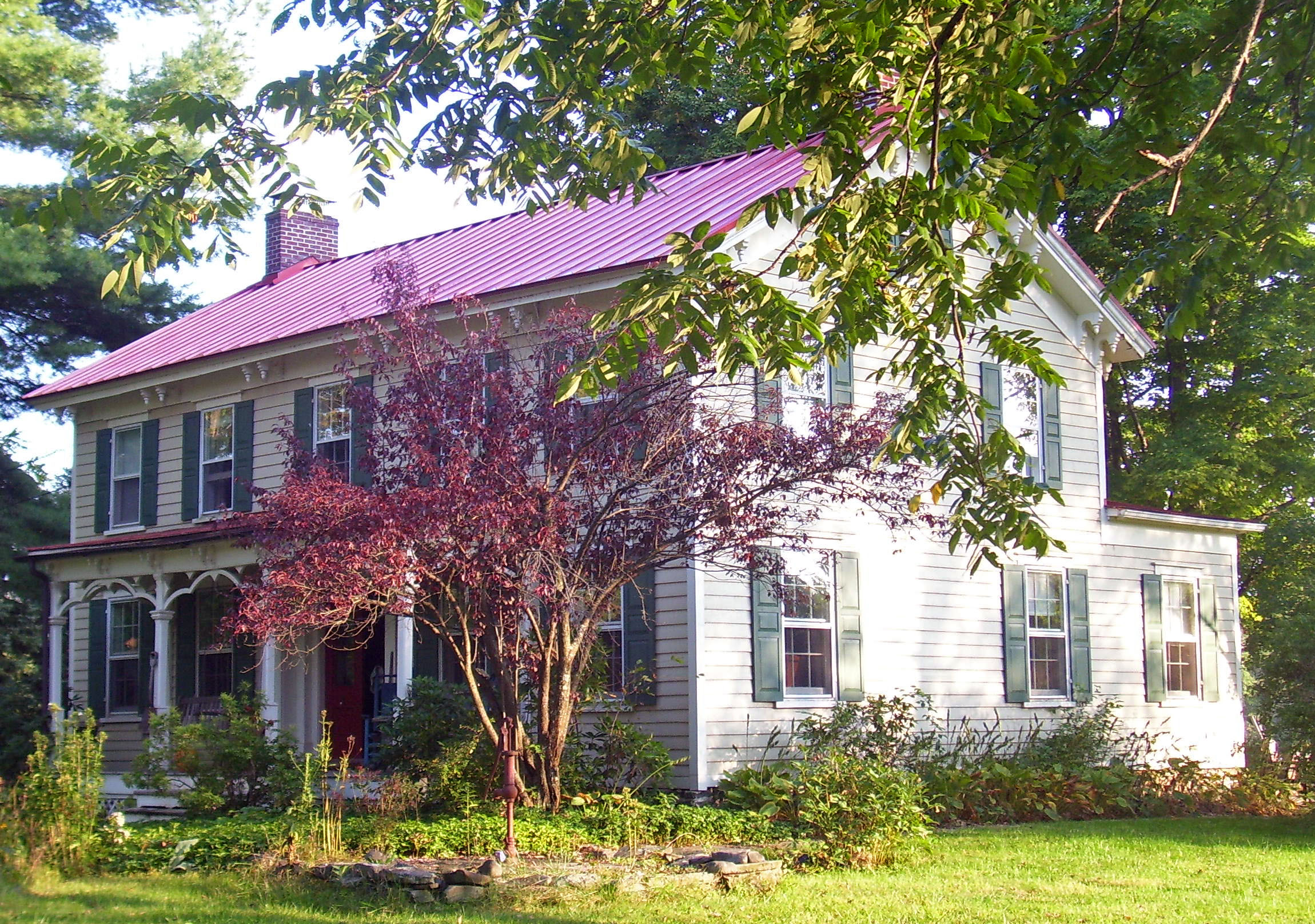
- North elevation and west profile, 2008
- Location: Gardiner, NY
- Nearest city: Poughkeepsie
- Coordinates: 41°41′10″N 74°10′15″W
- Area: 42.6 acres (17.2 ha)
- Built: ca. 1850
- MPS: Shawangunk Valley MRA
- NRHP reference No.: 83001812
- Added to NRHP: September 26, 1983

The Bevier House is located on Bevier Road in Gardiner, New York, United States. It is a frame house built in the mid-19th century.

It is one of the few remaining intact farmhouses in Gardiner from before the Civil War, with a decorative front facade and marbleized main staircase. In 1983 it was listed on the National Register of Historic Places.

== Property ==
The house is located on a 42.6-acre (17.2 ha) farmstead on the south side of Bevier Road a short distance from Albany Post Road (Ulster County Route 9), just across from the Shawangunk Kill near where it drains into the Wallkill River. The farmstead property is mostly open, with outbuildings to the south and west. The land alongside the Shawangunk is wooded.

Structurally the house is a two-story five-by-three-bay frame building sided in clapboard with a gabled metal roof pierced by brick chimneys at the east and west ends. Two wings, one single-story and the other two, project from the south (rear) elevation. A porch with a flat metal roof runs across the middle three bays of the north facade.

The roofline has overhanging eaves supported by paired brackets with acorn pendants over a plain frieze. The porch roof has smaller, similar paired brackets, with its roof supported by square pillars with pilasters. Decorative arches and diamond pendants run between them. The windows have plain surrounds with flat shutters and drip-mold friezes.

A pilastered and recessed double-paneled glazed doorway in the center of the first floor leads to the central hall. The stairway is marbleized. The basement has exposed hewn ceiling beams with a pulley for the butter churn once there. The attic's mortise and tenon framing is set at a wide angle and pegged without a ridge beam, a common practice in the middle of the 19th century. The two-story kitchen wing on the east has an early 20th-century kitchen on its second floor, with dry sink, hand pump and coal stove.

Outbuildings start with a single-story gabled barn to the south with a shed addition on its west. A gabled privy is adjacent. To the northwest, just off the road, is a gabled barn with a saltbox roof becoming part of the gabled extension on the northeast. All are considered contributing properties to the National Register listing.

== History ==
In 1853, Abraham Bevier bought property described as being southwest of the Shawangunk Kill, with tenements, from Levi van Keuren. He is described as the owner on an atlas published that year and again in 1858, suggesting the house had been built a few years prior, just around 1850. The two south wings, the most significant changes to it, were added around 1917. It has remained a private residence ever since, although the accompanying farm property has been subdivided to the current parcel.

== See also ==
- National Register of Historic Places listings in Ulster County, New York
