= Ted LeFevre =

American theatrical set designer (born 1964)

Ted LeFevre (born July 8, 1964) is an American theatrical set designer.

== Early life ==
He was born in Wilmington, Delaware, and has worked in and around New York City since 1990. In the early 2000's, he designed the sets for Anything Goes, Cabaret, 42nd Street and Singin' in the Rain at the Trump Plaza Hotel in Atlantic City, as well as a revue of Stevie Wonder's songs for the Venetian Hotel in Las Vegas starring Chaka Khan and directed by Billy Porter.

== Career ==
Ted has Art Directed for television in New York since 2010, for Hulu's Wu-Tang: An American Saga, Fox's Prodigal Son and Us & Them, CBS' Evil, Elementary and A Gifted Man, NBC's Shades of Blue and Mercy, FX's Louie, Starz' Power, USA's Royal Pains, and DirecTV's Damages. He has assisted on the films The Other Woman and A Walk Among the Tombstones, and on Amazon's two-time Art Directors' Guild award-winning The Marvelous Mrs. Maisel, plus NBC's God Friended Me, Starz' Sweetbitter, FX's The Americans, CBS' BrainDead, HBO's Boardwalk Empire, ABC's Zero Hour, and USA's Political Animals, working on an average of 20 scripts or episodes per year.

In 2016, LeFevre was elected Local Union Executive Board Trustee from the Eastern Region of United Scenic Artists Local USA 829 of the International Alliance of Theatrical Stage Employees, and re-elected to a second three-year term in 2019, and a third in 2022.

LeFevre was the associate to Bob Crowley for Disney's 2000 production of Elton John and Tim Rice's Aida, which won a Tony Award for "Best Scenic Design". He worked again with him on Tom Stoppard's The Invention of Love at Lincoln Center in 2001; the set was nominated for a Tony Award and won the Drama Desk Award for "Best Design of a Play".

LeFevre also worked on Broadway with John Doyle on the 2005 Sweeney Todd revival, and with Derek McLane on the 2007 Grease revival. He worked with Robert Jones on Stoppard's play Rock 'n' Roll, directed by Trevor Nunn in 2007, as well as The Sound of Music in Toronto in 2008. He was the associate designer on other Broadway play revivals The Country Girl, directed by Mike Nichols, and Boeing-Boeing in 2008, and on Blithe Spirit, for which Angela Lansbury won a Tony award, and Exit the King, for which Geoffrey Rush won a Tony award, in 2009.

Among LeFevre's Off-Off-Broadway premieres are play productions at Circle Rep Lab, the H.B. Playwrights' Foundation, Pulse Ensemble, EST/Playwrights' Collective, Naked Eye/Kasbah Project and two seasons as the resident designer for the Miranda Theatre Company. LeFevre also worked for two seasons in New York designing classics and new works for the American Globe Theatre.

Regional credits range from Fairfield County Stage Company to Princeton University and Cincinnati Playhouse in the Park and the John W. Engeman Theatre in Northport, Long Island. Related work includes the TV-Land Mall Tour and “Gullah Gullah Island Live” shows for Nickelodeon Entertainment, a double bill for the Bronx Opera Company, and two teleplays for WQED-TV in Pittsburgh.

LeFevre's designs for the new musical Ebenezer in New York during Christmas of 1996 led to work on twelve summer shows for Surflight Theatre in Beach Haven, New Jersey during their 1998 and 1999 seasons, then Gigi in 2001, On the Town in 2002, Fiddler on the Roof in 2003, State Fair and "Anything Goes" in 2004, Shenandoah in 2005, "Annie Get Your Gun" in 2006, "Aida" in 2007, "All Shook Up" and "The Will Rogers Follies" in 2008, "Hairspray" in 2009, and "The Drowsy Chaperone" in 2010.

His assistant design work includes ten international and touring companies of Beauty and the Beast, two new musicals at Goodspeed Opera, and both A Christmas Carol at Madison Square Garden and Carnevale at Radio City for Tony Walton. He also worked on productions of Spamalot and Phantom in Las Vegas. In addition, Ted has drafted and built models for sixteen new productions at the Metropolitan Opera, and done renderings for dozens of commercials and industrials.

Ted drafted the 2003 Broadway season's Tony-nominated Hairspray, designed by the Rockwell Group, as well as Eugene Lee's Tony-award-winning set design for 2004's Wicked, and both "The Wedding Singer" and "The Lieutenant of Inishmore" for Scott Pask in 2005.

== Education ==
LeFevre's undergraduate degree in Art (abstract oil painting) is from Brown University, where he joined the Alpha Delta Phi fraternity, and his MFA in Scenic Design is from Carnegie Mellon University. He has been a member in good standing of United Scenic Artists Local 829 of the International Alliance of Theatrical Stage Employees since 1992. He and his husband of thirty four years are the fathers of twin sons.
