= Ian Theodor Beelen =

Dutch exegete and orientalist

Ian Theodor Beelen (b. at Amsterdam, 12 January 1807; d. at Leuven, 31 March 1884) was a Dutch exegete and orientalist.

== Life ==
After a course of studies at Rome, crowned by the Doctorate of Theology, he was in 1836 appointed Professor of Sacred Scripture and Semitic languages in the recently reorganized Catholic University of Leuven. This position he held till 1876, when he resigned his place to his pupil, Thomas Joseph Lamy.

Beelen revived Oriental studies in Belgium, and introduced into that country Oriental printing by means of a complete font of Hebrew, Syriac, Arabic, and Ethiopic type, which he purchased. In recognition of his merits as a scholar he was made domestic prelate of the pope, consultor of the Congregation of the Index, honorary canon of Liège, and Knight of the Order of Leopold (Belgium).

== Works ==
He was the author of the following Biblical works, among which his commentary on the Epistle to the Romans is especially esteemed:

- Dissertatio theologica qua sententiam ... esse S. Scripturae multiplicem interdum sensum litteralem, nullo fundamento satis firmo niti demonstrare conatur (Leuven, 1845);
- Interpretatio ep. S. Pauli ad Philip. (ib., 1849; 2nd ed., ib., 1852, entitled: Commentarius in ep. S. Pauli ad Philip.)
- Commentarius in Acta Apost., with Greek and Latin text (2 vols., ib., 1850–55; 2nd ed., without Greek and Latin texts, ib., 1864)
- Commentarius in ep. S. Pauli ad Rom. (ib., 1854)
- "Grammatica graecitatis N. T." (ib., 1857)

and in Dutch,

- "Rules for a new Translation of the N. T." (Leuven, 1858);
- a translation of the N. T. made in accordance with these rules (3 vols., ib., 1859–69);
- "The Epistles and Gospels of the Ecclesiastical Year," with annotations (ib., 1870);
- translation of the Psalms, with annotations (2 vols., ib., 1877–78);
- translation of Proverbs and of Ecclesiasticus (ib., 1879).

He also published two works in the field of Oriental scholarship:

- Chrestomathia rabbinica et chaldaica (3 vols., Leuven, 1841–1843)
- Clementis Rom. epistolae binae de Virginitate, syriace (ib., 1856), in which he defends the genuineness of these two letters.
