= Jacques Guarrigue-Lefèvre =

French fashion designer (born 1961)

- Born: July 13, 1961 (age 64); Near Düsseldorf, Germany
- Occupations: Fashion designer, Businessperson
- Years active: 1985–present
- Known for: Founder of Paris Élysée, Haute couture fashion, UNESCO Goodwill Ambassador
- Notable work: Cardino fashion line, Paris Élysée Private Club
- Title: Founder and President of Paris Élysée
- Relatives: Hans Treusch (Baron of Buttlar-Bradenfels, great-uncle)

Jacques Guarrigue-Lefèvre is the founder, owner and current president of Paris Élysée, a private club based in Paris. He is one of the numerous great-nephews of Baron of Buttlar-Bradenfels, Hans Treusch. He started as a fashion designer. He was born on 13 July 1961, near Düsseldorf, Germany, to French parents. He moved to Paris in 1965. There he studied art and architecture and collaborated with Karl Lagerfeld's team for a few years. He then moved on to work with Helmut Lang's society until he became head of his own label, Cardino, in 1985. He indeed founded his own house in the same year and began with haute couture in 1986.

Guarrigue-Lefèvre was known for his renaissance age style and designs. He prefers conservative, classical shapes and motifs, and loved to emphasize the human body's natural forms and curves. He advanced into unisex fashions, sometimes experimental, and not always practical.

Guarrigue-Lefèvre was one of the first couturiers to turn to Asia, and notably Japan, as a high fashion market when he travelled there in 1990.

In 1991, he became of the UNESCO Goodwill Ambassadors.

Unfortunately, in 1994, he was expelled from the Chambre Syndicale de la Haute Couture et du Prêt-à-Porter and from the Maison du Haute Couture for launching a ready-to-wear collection for the Printemps department store without permission from the chamber. He tried to launch his Cardino collection on his own, but his notoriety was not enough to re-conquer the high fashion market, and despite his previous experience, his name and work were disliked by the public.

Angry and disappointed, Guarrigue-Lefèvre then disappeared from the scene for a few years. According from several sources, he supposedly left to Argentina with his family to enjoy the fruit of his work.

He did not let this failure condemn him though, and finally reappeared to the scene in May 2001, where he purchased a few restaurants in Paris, including Le Chaudron.

In 2005, Guarrigue-Lefèvre founded Paris Élysée Private Club, more widely known as Paris Élysée. The club first opened his door to Parisian elite in June of this year. Guarrigue-Lefèvre then expanded his clientele by inviting several members of the European Elite in late 2005. The club is now opened to a more international clientele.

Guarrigue-Lefèvre is now partner with Alphonse Ruiz de Turckeim, third son of the Marquis Ruiz de Turckeim.

Guarrigue-Lefèvre owns the ruins of a castle in Bonnieux, Vaucluse. He has partially renovated the site and regularly organizes theatre festivals there.

== Sources ==
André Avard, "Intemporellement Votre", Le Monde, 14 Feb. 2006:A3

Michaël D. Cornette, "Quoi de neuf à Paris?," Paris Capitale Magazine, 4 Jan. 2006:90.
