= John A. Lafevre House and School =

Historic house in New York, United States

- John A. Lafevre; House and School
- U.S. National Register of Historic Places
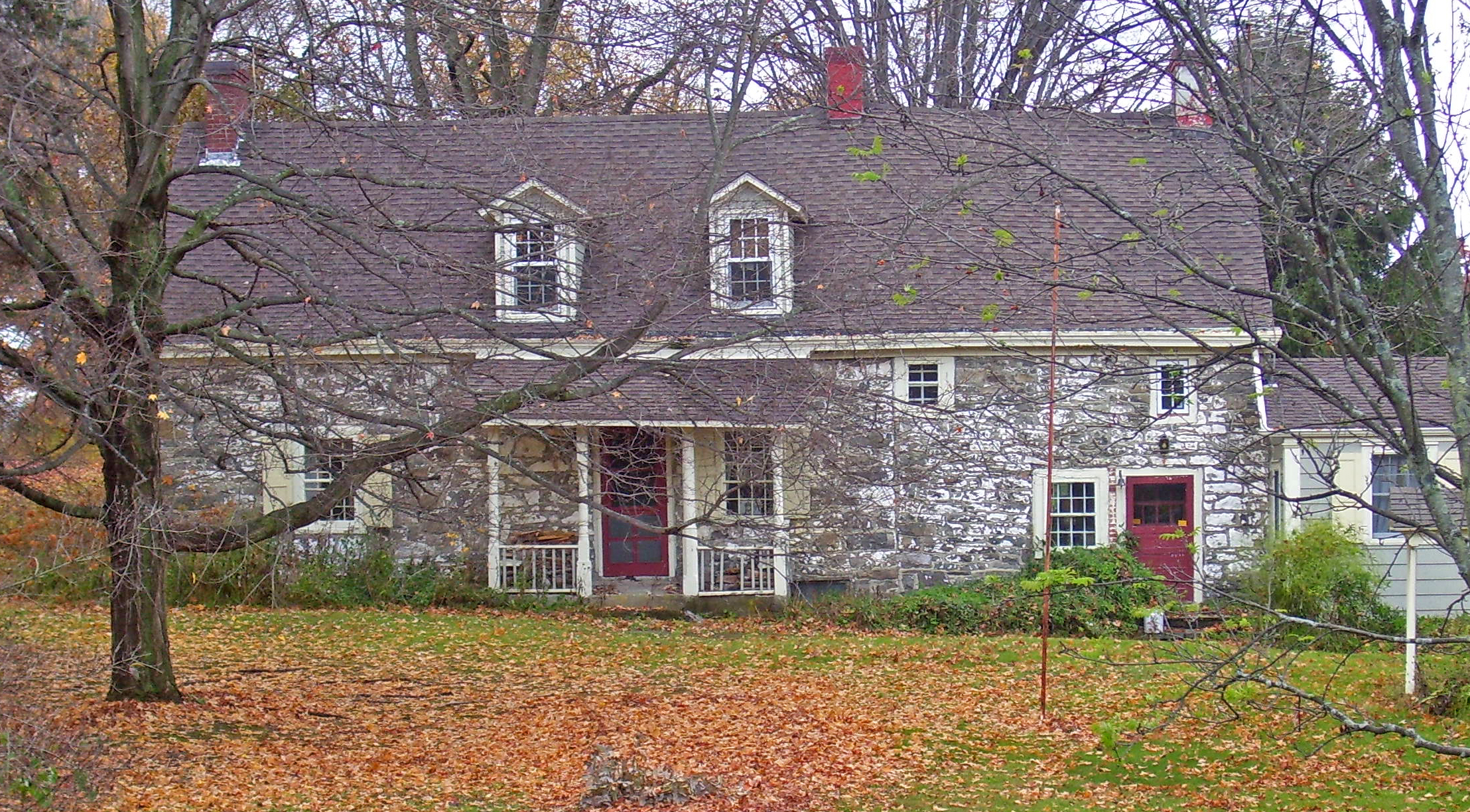
- House in 2007

- Location within New York Location within the United States
- Location: Gardiner, NY
- Nearest city: Poughkeepsie
- Coordinates: 41°41′45″N 74°07′18″W
- Area: 73.2 acres (29.6 ha)
- Built: 1772, 1835
- Architectural style: Colonial, Dutch Colonial
- NRHP reference No.: 89002023
- Added to NRHP: November 16, 1989

The John A. Lafevre House and School is located along NY 208 in the town of Gardiner, New York, United States. It is often believed to be in New Paltz as it is within that town's ZIP Code. The house is a stone structure dating to 1772; the school was built in 1835 and remained in use for almost a century. Both are well-preserved examples of their type of building and were listed on the National Register of Historic Places in 1989.

== Buildings ==
=== House ===
The home is a classic example of the stone houses built in the area by the Huguenot settlers, reflecting their vernacular traditions. They used local limestone, and pointed the corners with mortar derived from the same local limestone. Hand-hewn timbers were used for the floor beams and roof plates with lighter, untrimmed poles handling most of the framing.

The interior typically followed a long rectangular plan with two large rooms, a cellar and a loft. This design is unique to Ulster County and contrasts with more Dutch designs found to the north and south. The original beams and joists, as well as many period fireplace mantels, remain.

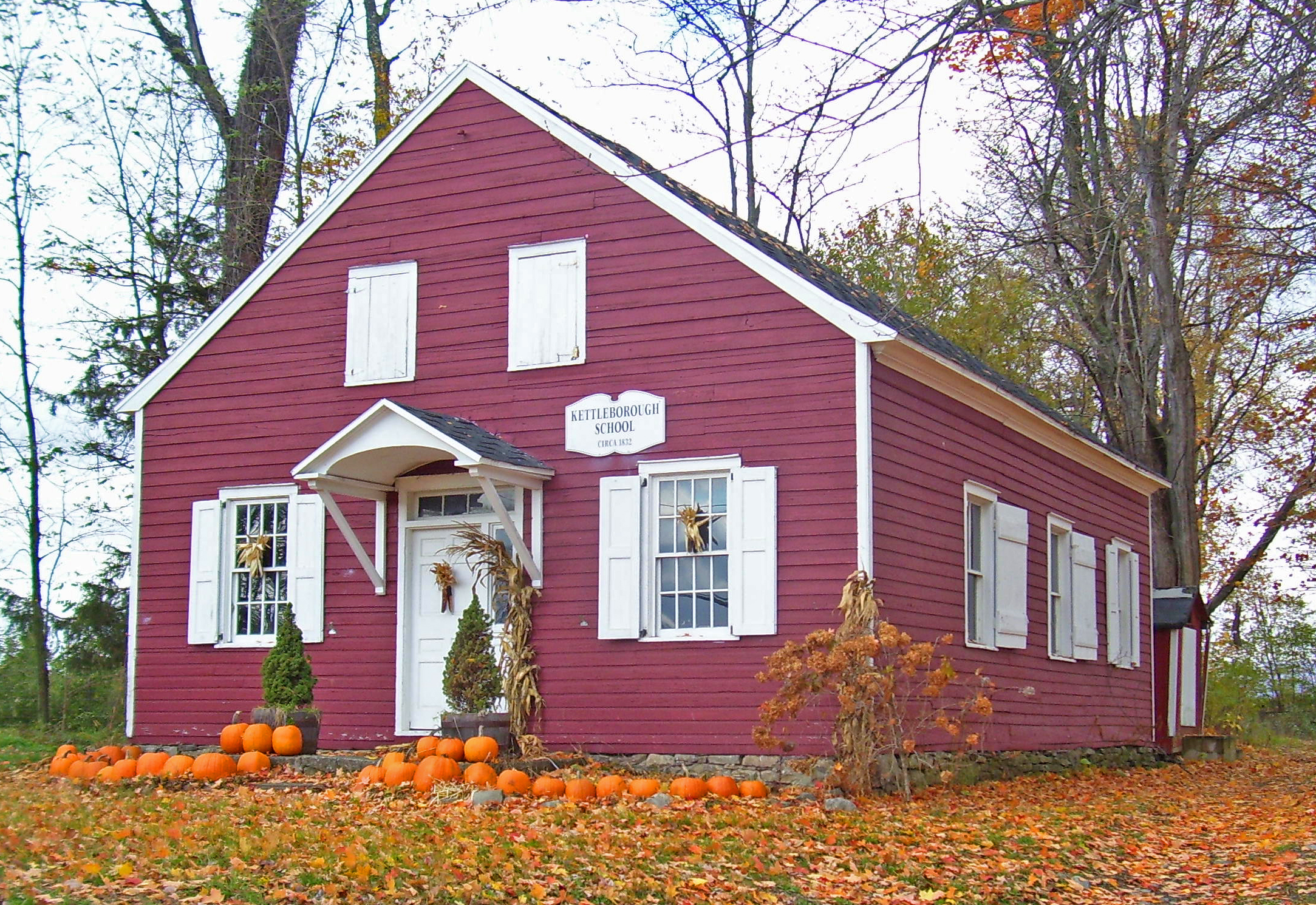
The Kettleborough School

=== School ===
The school is a typical early one-room schoolhouse of a type common to rural New York in the early to mid-19th century. Its division into classroom and vestibule space reflects the influence of educational reformers of the day such as William A. Alcott, who called for school buildings to be equipped with amenities such as heating and lighting so they would be more conducive to learning.

== History ==
Lafevre (1746–1818) was a descendant of the original New Paltz Huguenots. He was granted 500 acres (2 km^{2}) of the Huguenot's original patent and built the house there in 1772. In 1798 he added a third room, following in the Ulster County tradition of expanding the house linearly rather than on the back.

His son Matthew (1774–1851) altered the interior and may have added the rear addition. In 1835 the growing community of Gardiner needed land for a school, so he donated a small parcel near the house to the Kettleborough School District. The red wooden one-room schoolhouse erected was used by Kettleborough and its successors until 1932. The estate is now owned by Tammy Boylan, and her husband, Michael.
