= Teodoro Viero =

Italian painter, printmaker and publisher (1740–1819)

Teodoro Viero (1740–1819) was an Italian printmaker and publisher, active in Venice.

== Life ==
Teodoro Viero was born on 19 March 1740. He was a pupil of Nicolò Cavalli, Pitteri and Bartolozzi, from whom he learnt the art of engraving. He practised as a miniature painter, engraver and publisher, specializing in views of Venice. He died on 2 August 1819 or, according to some sources, on 2 October 1821. He was the maternal uncle of Luigi Schiavonetti.

== Sources ==
- Beyer, Andreas; Savoy, Bénédicte; Tegethoff, Wolf, eds. (2021). "Viero, Teodoro". Allgemeines Künstlerlexikon - International Artist Database - Online. Berlin, New York: K. G. Saur. Retrieved 12 October 2022.
- "Teodoro Viero". British Museum. Retrieved 12 October 2022.
