= Valentin Lefebre =

Flemish painter, draughtsman and printmaker

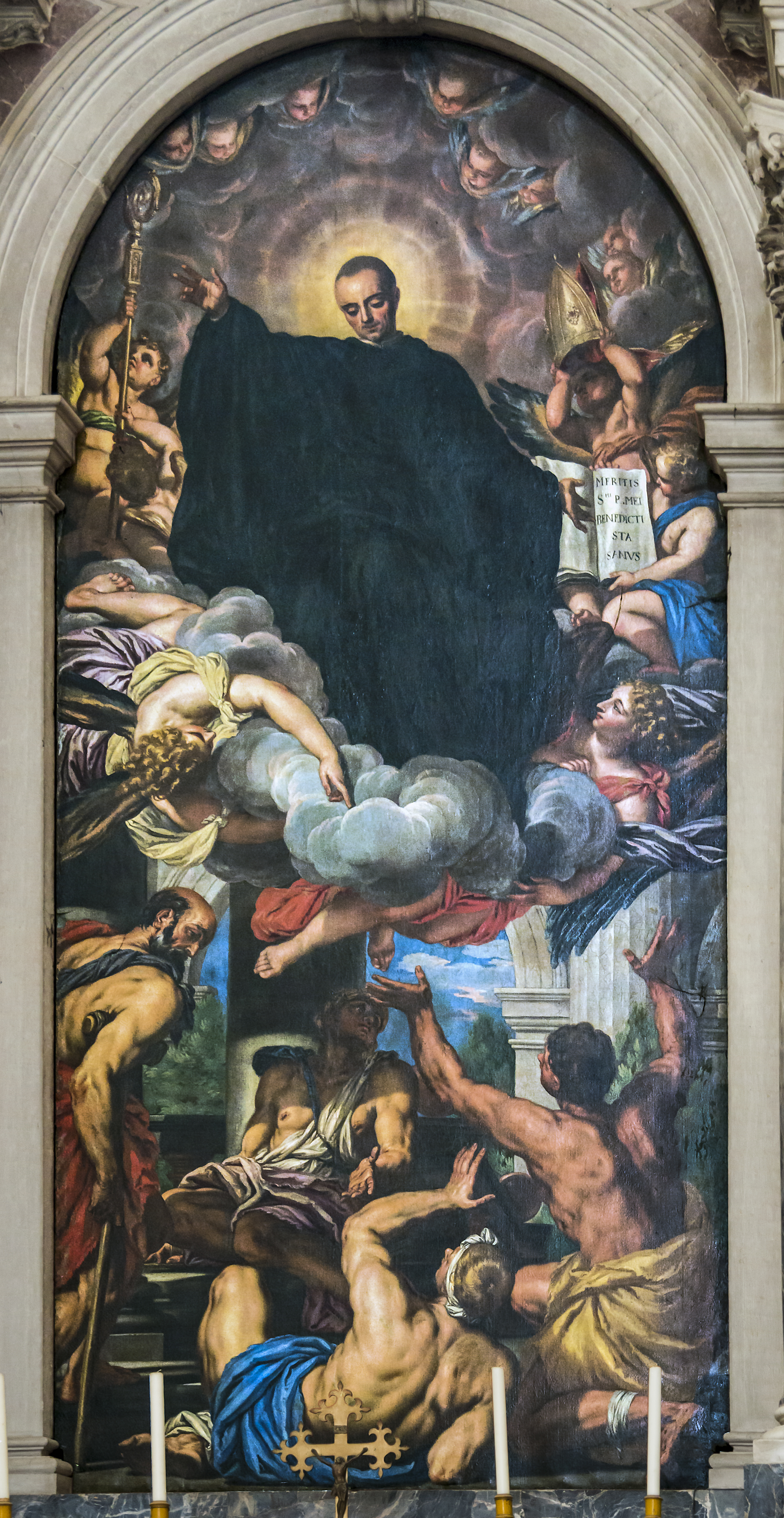
Lefebre's altarpiece for the Capella di San Mauro in the abbey church of Santa Giustina, Padua

Valentin Lefebre (Note: The name is variously given as Lefebre, Le Febre, Le Fevre, Lefebure, and Lefèvre.) (1637–1677) was a Flemish painter, draughtsman and printmaker.

== Life ==
Valentin Lefebre was born in Brussels in 1637, or around 1642. He died in 1677, or between 1680 and 1682: allegedly in Venice, or in England.

== Works ==
He etched the series Opera selectiora quae Titianus … et Paulus Calliari Veronensis invenerunt et pinxerunt. The collection consists of fifty-three etchings after works by Titian, Paolo Veronese, and Jacopo Tintoretto. The series was first published in Venice by Jacob van Campen in 1682, (Note: The edition of 1680 has probably never existed.) and was dedicated to Louis XIV. It was often reprinted: in 1684, 1749, and 1763; and later by Teodoro Viero, who added his address to the plates, in 1786 and 1789.

In the church of Santa Giustina in Padua is his painting of Saint Maurus with angels (1688).

== Sources ==
- Beyer, Andreas; Savoy, Bénédicte; Tegethoff, Wolf, eds. (2021). "Lefebvre, Valentine". Allgemeines Künstlerlexikon - International Artist Database - Online. Berlin, New York: K. G. Saur. Retrieved 12 October 2022.
- Peinelt-Schmidt, Sabine (2019). "9. Of Oak and Elder, Cloud-like Angels, and a Bird's Nest: The Graphic Interpretations of Titian's The Death of St. Peter Martyr by Martino Rota, Giovanni Battista Fontana, Valentin Lefebre, John Baptist Jackson, and their Successors". In Goodchild, Karen; Oettinger, April; Prosperetti, Leopoldine (eds.). Green Worlds in Early Modern Italy: Art and the Verdant Earth. Amsterdam: Amsterdam University Press. pp. 207–216.
- "Lefebvre, Valentin". Benezit Dictionary of Artists. Oxford Art Online. 2011. Retrieved 12 October 2022.
- "Valentin Lefebre". British Museum. Retrieved 12 October 2022.
