= Émile Lefebvre =

French playwright (1825–1874)

- Born: Charles Émile Lefebvre; 26 August 1825; 4th arrondissement of Paris
- Died: 8 February 1874 (aged 48); 8th arrondissement of Paris
- Occupations: Playwright, songwriter

Charles Émile Lefebvre (26 August 1825 – 8 February 1874) was a French playwright and songwriter of the 19th century.

== Biography ==
His plays were performed at the Théâtre des Délassements-Comiques, the Théâtre des Variétés and at the Théâtre du Palais-Royal.

== Works ==
- 1851 – "Four Hundred Thousand Francs for Twenty Sous" (French: Quatre cent mille francs pour vingt sous), a one-act vaudeville, with Émile Colliot, at the Théâtre des Délassements-Comiques (15 March)
- 1851 – "The Vendéen" (French: Le Vendéen), a one-act comic opera, music by H. Louis (19 October)
- 1851 – "In the Other World" (French: Dans l'autre monde), a vaudeville reverie in two acts and three scenes, with Émile Colliot, at the Théâtre des Variétés (26 March)
- 1852 – "The Return of the Eagle" (French: Le Retour de l'Aigle), a cantata, music by Sylvain François Mangeant (Note: In addition to his work as a composer, Sylvain François Mangeant (1818–1889) was a conductor at the Théâtre Historique, the Théâtre de la Gaîté, and the Théâtre du Palais-Royal in Paris, as well as at the Mikhailovsky Theatre in Saint Petersburg.)
- 1853 – "The Friend of the House" (French: L'Ami de la maison), a one-act comedy-vaudeville, with Émile Colliot, at the Théâtre des Variétés (15 February)
- 1853 – "Beautiful Bouquets!" (French: Les Cris de Reims. Quets! Quets!), music by Gustave Bley
- 1854 – "The Reims Review 1853, or Rémi, the Vesle and Co." (French: La Revue de Reims 1853, ou Rémi, la Vesle et Cie), a farce-vaudeville in 6 scenes, with René de Pont-Jest and Léon Delmas, music by M. Jhan, at the Grand Théâtre de Reims (26 January)
- 1855 – "Sebastopol" (French: Sébastopol), a military cantata, music by Léon Paliard (Note: Léon Paliard (1826–1907), a student of Adolphe Adam and Ambroise Thomas, had a career as a composer before becoming, from 1873, Treasurer General of the Hospices Civils de Lyon.) (22 September)
- 1860 – "The Great Tide of 9 March, April Fool's Day" (French: La Grande Marée du 9 mars, poisson d'avril), comic scene, music by Sylvain Mangeant
- 1860 – "French Savoy" (French: La Savoie française), cantata, music by Sylvain Mangeant, at the Théâtre du Palais-Royal
- 1860 – "To Our Lady of Hope" (French: A Notre-Dame d'Espérance), melody, music by Willent-Bordogni (Note: Marc Eugène Willent dit Eugène Willent-Bordogni (1835–1906) was the son of the composer Jean-Baptiste-Joseph Willent dit Joseph Willent-Bordogni (1809–1852) and the singer Louise Angélina Bordogni, daughter of the Italian tenor Marco Bordogni (1789–1856).)
- 1861 – "At Our Lady of La Salette" (French: A Notre-Dame de la Salette), music by Willent-Bordogni
- 1861 – "In the Name of Christ" (French: Au nom du Christ), music by Willent-Bordogni
- 1861 – "Fly My Gondola" (French: Vole ma gondole), barcarolle, music by Willent-Bordogni
- 1861 – "Miss Pochonnet", a two-character comic scene, music by Victor Parizot, at the Théâtre du Palais-Royal (29 December)
- 1862 – "Danae and Her Maid" (French: Danaé et sa bonne), one-act operetta, music by Sylvain Mangeant, at the Théâtre du Palais-Royal (6 July)
- 1863 – "She's No More!" (French: Elle n'est plus !), vaudeville in 1 act, music by Ernest Blanquin
- 1864 – "She's Gone!!!" (French: Elle a passé !!!), romance, music by Willent-Bordogni
- 1865 – "Fortunia's Revenge" (French: La Revanche de Fortunia), musical farce in 1 act, music by Victor Robillard (Note: The composer and conductor Victor Léonard Robillard (1827–1893) was one of the founders of SACEM.) (1 July)
