= Minard Lafever Holman =

American civil engineer (1852–1925)

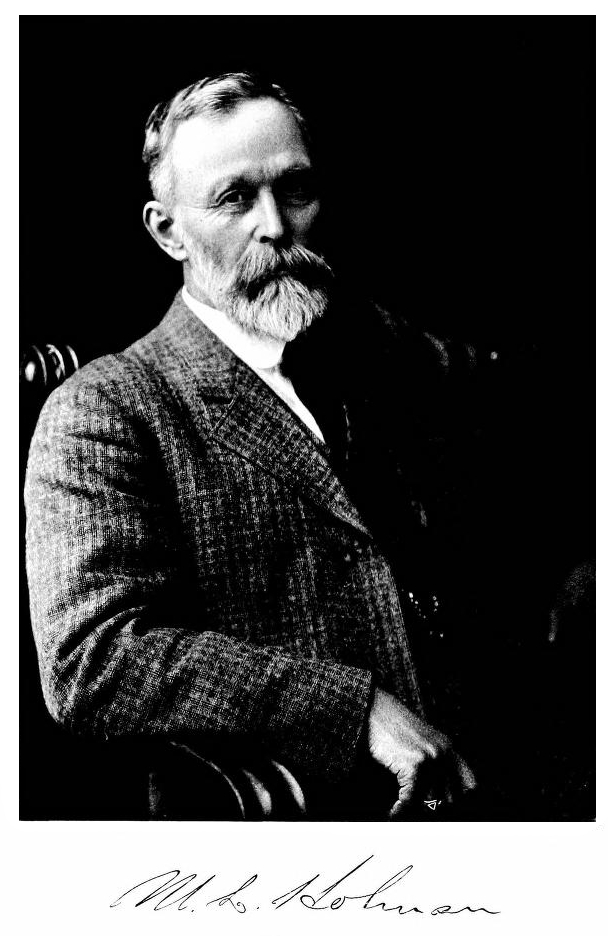
- Born: June 15, 1852; Mexico, Maine
- Died: January 4, 1925 (aged 72); St. Louis
- Education: Washington University in St. Louis
- Occupation: Civil engineer

Minard Lafever Holman (June 15, 1852 in Mexico, Maine – January 4, 1925 in St Louis) was an American civil engineer at the City of St. Louis Water Division, known as President of the American Society of Mechanical Engineers in the year 1908–09.

== Biography ==
Born in Mexico, Maine in 1852, Holman was the John H. and Mary (Richards) Holman. He grew up and attended public schools in St. Louis. He continued to study civil engineering at the Washington University in St. Louis, and graduated as civil engineer in June 1874. In 1875, he was awarded the first Western Sanitary Commission Scholarships. In 1904, the Washington University would grant him the honorary Master of Arts degree.

After graduation Holman started his career at the United States Treasury department in Washington D.C. In 1877 he joined the City of St. Louis administration as a draftsman appointed at the Water Division, and worked his way up to principal assistant engineer in the department by 1878. He then accepted the appointment of Chief Engineer at the Missouri Street Railway Company, preparing the transition into cable traction in the city.

Early 1880s the mayor of St. Louis David R. Francis appointed Holman Water Commissioner, in charge of the city's water supply. In this position, he supervised the designing of the Chain of Rocks Water Treatment Facility. This was planned 11 miles north of downtown St. Louis along the Mississippi River, a location initially chosen by James Kirkwood two decades before. After 1887 Holman supervise the construction of the Water Works Extension, and after the opening in 1894 he became its first chief engineer of the plant. In 1899 he returned to the city's administration, where he was appointed Water Commissioner.

In the year 1900 he started his own consulting engineering practice in St Louis. He consulted other cities on water supply such as Kansas City, Cincinnati, Omaha and Denver, and abroad in Canada, Mexico and Germany. Between 1908–09. Holman was elected President of the American Society of Mechanical Engineers.

One of Holman's sons Charles Henry Holman (August 23, 1880 – August 11, 1964) followed in his footsteps, and contributed as civil engineer to the building of the Powersite Dam.

== Publications ==
- Minard Lafever Holman. "The conservation idea as applied to the American Society of Mechanical Engineers: Presidential address," in: Transactions of the American Society of Mechanical Engineers, Volume 30, 1908. p. 577-617

Publications about Holman

- David Emory Holman (1852–1924). The Holmans in America : concerning the descendants of Solaman Holman who settled in West Newbury, Massachusetts, in 1692-3 one of whom is William Howard Taft, the President of the United States, including a page of the other lines of Holmans in America, with notes and anecdotes of those of the name in other countries. Published 1909
- ASME. "Minard Lafever Holman," in: Transactions of the American Society of Mechanical Engineers, Volume 30, 1908. p. 1-3
