= Gardiner (CDP), New York =

Gardiner, New York
- CDP
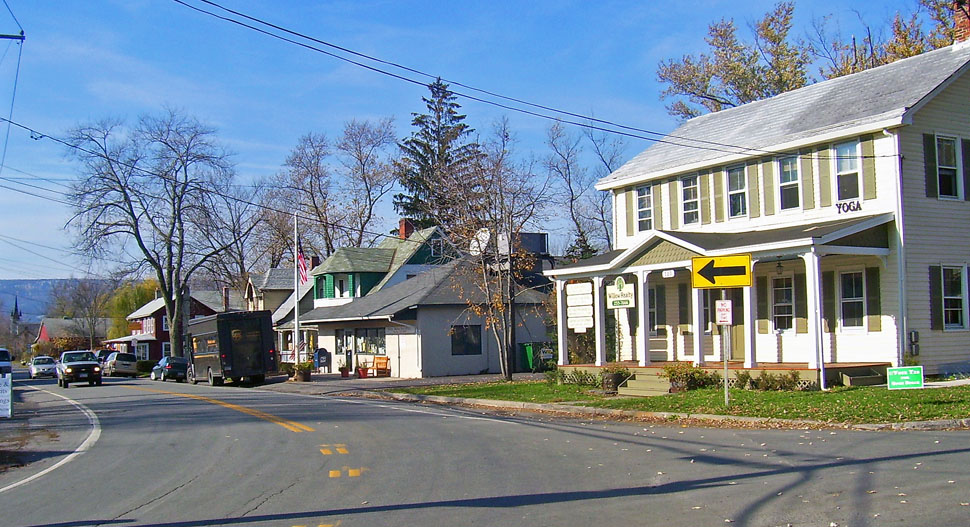
- Downtown Gardiner

- Location in Ulster County and the state of New York.
- Coordinates: 41°40′48″N 74°9′4″W
- Country: United States
- State: New York
- County: Ulster

Area
  - Total: 3.86 sq mi (10.00 km^{2})
  - Land: 3.86 sq mi (10.00 km^{2})
  - Water: 0 sq mi (0.00 km^{2})
- Elevation: 315 ft (96 m)

Population (2020)
  - Total: 952
  - Density: 246.5/sq mi (95.16/km^{2})
- Time zone: UTC-5 (Eastern (EST))
  - Summer (DST): UTC-4 (EDT)
- ZIP code: 12525
- Area code: 845
- FIPS code: 36-28244
- GNIS feature ID: 0950882

Gardiner is a hamlet (and a census-designated place) in Ulster County, New York, United States. The population was 952 at the 2020 census.

The community is near the center of the Town of Gardiner on routes 44 and 55.

== Geography ==
Gardiner is located at 41°40′48″N 74°09′04″W (41.680114, -74.151143).

According to the United States Census Bureau, the CDP has a total area of 3.8 square miles (9.9 km^{2}). None of the area is covered with water.

== Demographics ==
Historical population
Census	Pop.	Note	%±
2000	856		—
2010	950		11.0%
2020	952		0.2%
U.S. Decennial Census

As of the census of 2000, there were 856 people, 342 households, and 234 families residing in the CDP. The population density was 223.8 inhabitants per square mile (86.4/km^{2}). There were 371 housing units at an average density of 97.0 per square mile (37.5/km^{2}). The racial makeup of the CDP was 96.85% White, 0.23% Native American, 0.58% Asian, 0.12% Pacific Islander, 1.05% from other races, and 1.17% from two or more races. Hispanic or Latino of any race were 4.56% of the population.

There were 342 households, out of which 31.9% had children under the age of 18 living with them, 55.6% were married couples living together, 8.5% had a female householder with no husband present, and 31.3% were non-families. 23.7% of all households were made up of individuals, and 6.7% had someone living alone who was 65 years of age or older. The average household size was 2.50 and the average family size was 2.95.

In the CDP, the population was spread out, with 23.7% under the age of 18, 7.2% from 18 to 24, 32.6% from 25 to 44, 25.5% from 45 to 64, and 11.0% who were 65 years of age or older. The median age was 37 years. For every 100 females, there were 95.9 males. For every 100 females age 18 and over, there were 98.5 males.

The median income for a household in the CDP was $48,365, and the median income for a family was $49,808. Males had a median income of $35,583 versus $23,281 for females. The per capita income for the CDP was $22,653. About 9.5% of families and 11.7% of the population were below the poverty line, including 24.0% of those under age 18 and 9.0% of those age 65 or over.

== Education ==
The CDP is in New Paltz Central School District.
