= Verkeerder Kill =

Tributary of the Shawangunk Kill in New York's Hudson Valley

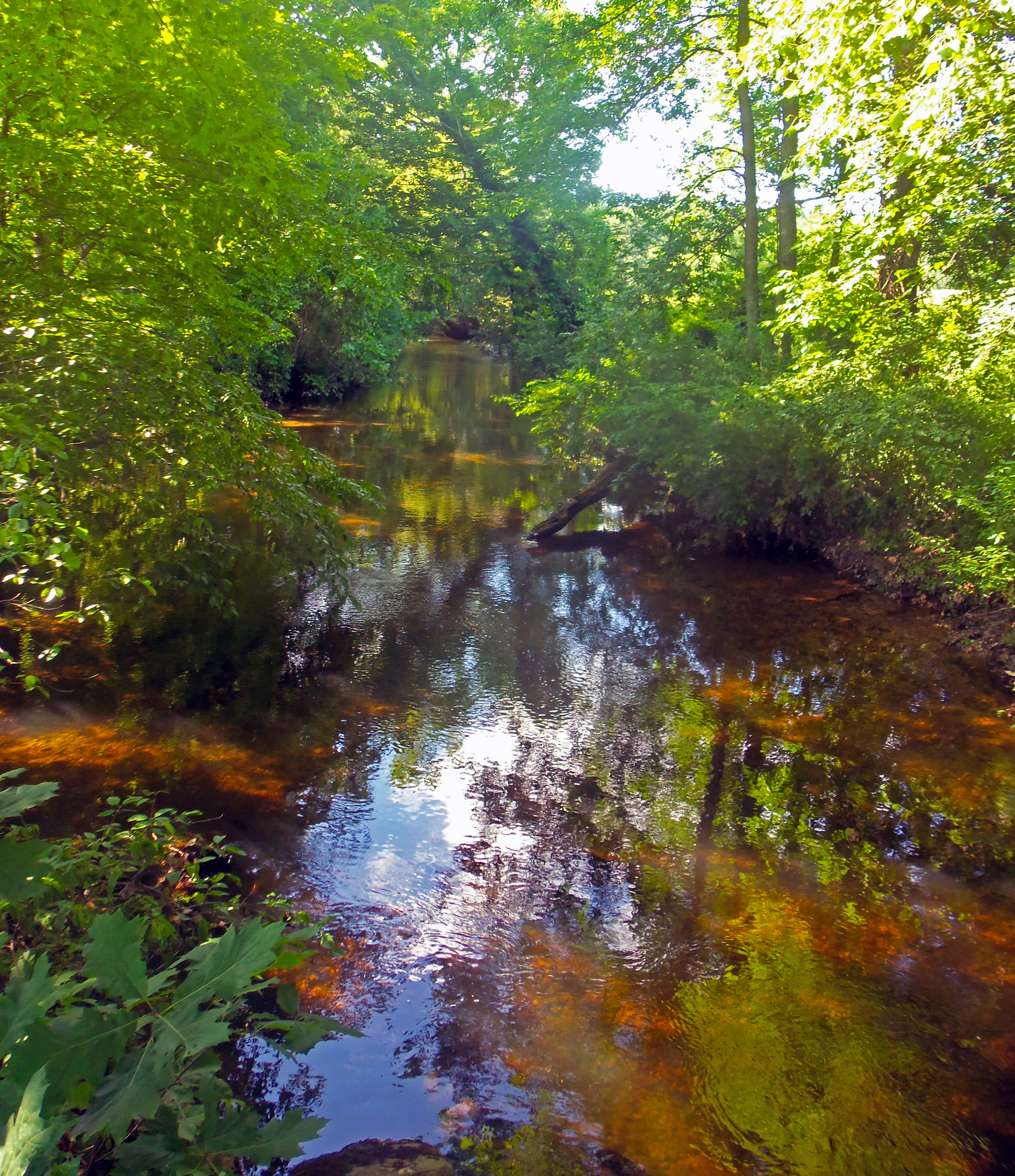
- Verkeerder Kill at Verkeerder Kill Park
- Etymology: Dutch for "wrong brook"

Location
- Country: United States
- State: New York
- Region: Hudson Valley
- County: Ulster
- Towns: Wawarsing, Shawangunk

Physical characteristics
- Source: Unnamed location on Shawangunk Ridge
  - location: Wawarsing
  - coordinates: 41°41′41″N 74°19′39″W
  - elevation: 2,060 ft (630 m)
- Mouth: Shawangunk Kill
  - location: SW of Pine Bush
  - coordinates: 41°36′7″N 74°19′33″W
  - elevation: 333 ft (101 m)
- Length: 8 mi (13 km), North-south

The Verkeerder Kill, sometimes Verkeerderkill and locally shortened to Kaidy Kill is an 8-mile-long (13 km) stream in Ulster County, New York, United States. It rises on the Shawangunk Ridge, in the town of Wawarsing, and flows southward through the town of Shawangunk, toward the Shawangunk Kill, itself a major tributary of the Wallkill River. Ultimately it is a part of the Hudson River's watershed.

It is best known for Verkeerder Kill Falls, a 187-foot (57 m) waterfall located on its headwaters just below its source, on the border between the two towns. The falls are a popular hiking destination along the Long Path, a long-distance hiking trail from New York City to the Capital District that traverses the area.

== Course ==
The Verkeerder rises as two small streams a short distance apart in the dwarf pine barrens of Sam's Point Preserve atop the Shawangunk Ridge near the southern boundary of the town of Wawarsing. The higher of the two, on the east, has its source at 2,060 feet (630 m). After flowing roughly 500 feet (150 m) south from their respective sources, they converge into the stream's main stem.

After another 500 feet, with the stream flowing on a bed of white stone, the Verkeerder Kill Falls Trail, part of the Long Path, fords the stream. Shortly afterwards, it reaches the distinctive cliffs of the Shawangunks and tumbles over Verkeerder Kill Falls, dropping 187 feet (57 m) and entering the town of Shawangunk. Below the falls it continues to descend steeply down a wooded gorge, passing some remote houses as it continues to the south. Almost a mile (1.6 km) below the falls, it receives from the northwest its first tributary, the Lake Maratanza outlet brook.

After descending another 100 feet (30 m) in its next quarter-mile (400 m), it reaches more gently sloping ground, having dropped 1,200 feet (370 m) in elevation during its first 2.5 miles (4.0 km). A half-mile (800 m) further to the south and 150 feet (50 m) below the foot of the ridge, still surrounded by woods, it flows under Indian Springs Road for its first road crossing. From here it veers to the southeast, crossing under two long dead-end roads in its next mile of woodlands with some cleared areas near the stream. The surrounding terrain levels out.

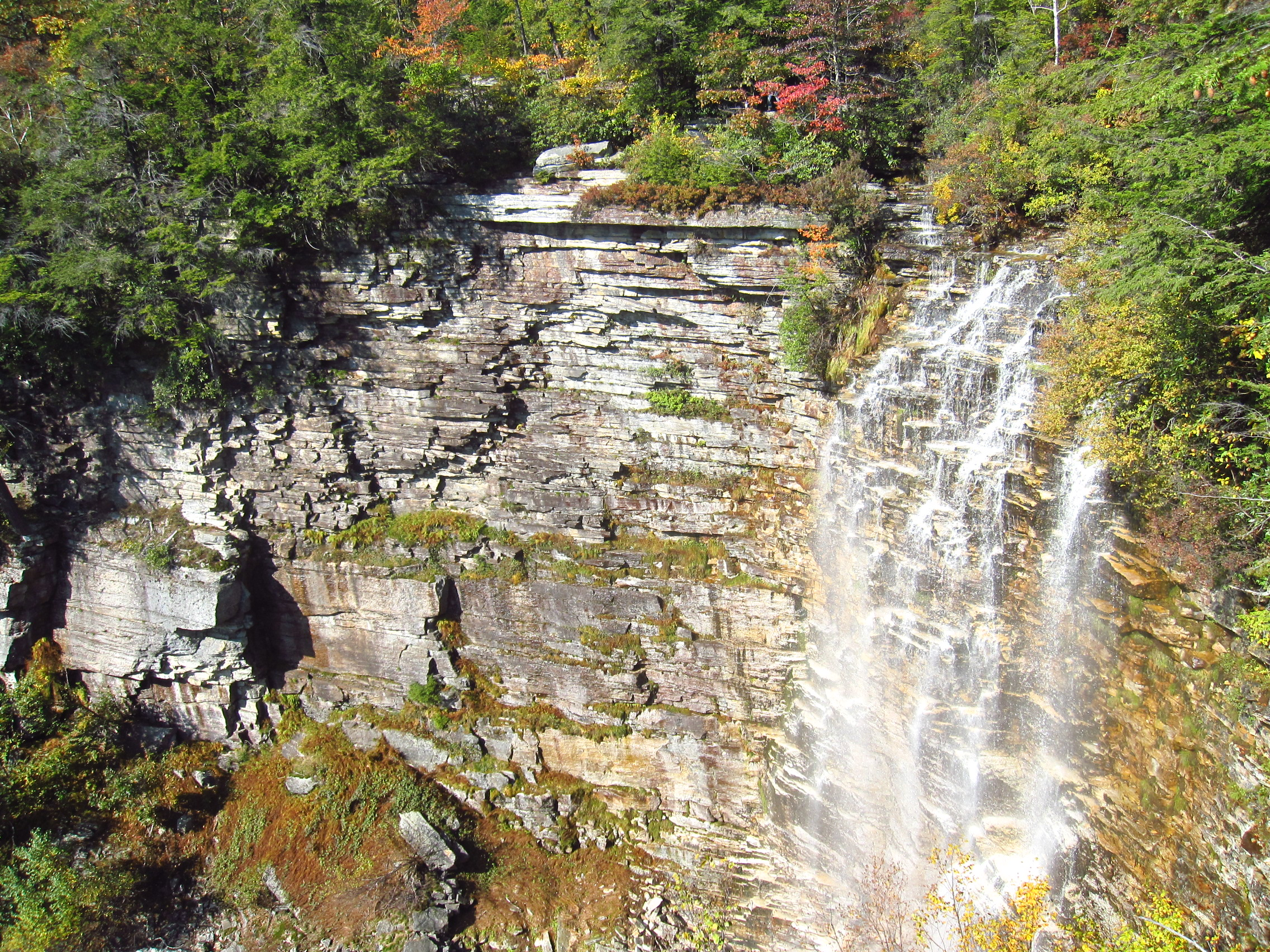
Verkeerder Kill Falls

For its next mile, the Verkeerder Kill returns to its southerly heading through unbroken forest. Shortly before reaching a wetland just under 500 feet (150 m) in elevation, it turns to the southwest. Half a mile downstream it turns southeast just before receiving its next tributary, the Murrays Pond outlet stream, from the west as well.

Shortly afterwards, it begins flowing closely along Sinsabaugh Road, paralleling it as it bends back to the southwest and then southeast again over the next mile. Here the woods begin to be broken by farmland. When the stream reaches the town's 83-acre (34 ha) Verkeerderkill Park on its west a half-mile below the Murrays Pond tributary confluence, a thin wooded buffer stands between it and open fields on either side.

At the southeast corner of the park the stream crosses under New York State Route 52, having descended to 416 feet (127 m). It meanders slightly as the surrounding woodlands increase, then resumes its southern course as it flows under Johns Estate Road. Once again a corridor of trees sheath it through fields as it begins a loop around the small hamlet of Ulsterville, curving south to cross under Burlingham Road (County Route 7), then back to the northeast briefly and then east through woods again to where it crosses under Ulsterville Road. It runs parallel to that street, turning southwest and crossing Seely Road twice, then Pirog Road, before it empties into the Shawangunk Kill just north of the Ulsterville Road bridge, at the Orange County line, south of the hamlet of Pine Bush, 333 feet (101 m) above sea level.

== History ==
If the Iroquois or any of the other Native American tribes in the area had a name for the stream, it was never recorded before European colonization. The first known mention of it is in a 1717 land patent application by Johannes Hardenbergh, in which the stream is referred to as Verkerde Kill. Hardenbergh also notes that it was also known as Pakanasink Creek, a name now used for a tributary that flows into the Shawangunk just downstream of the Verkeerder from the other side, in Orange County.

According to Shawangunks historian Marc Fried, the words "Verkeerder Kill" came from the Dutch for "wrong brook". Dutch was the first language of Hardenburgh and other settlers who had moved into the Shawangunk Valley since the 1680s.

The reason for this name has always been something of a mystery. Since it can also have the sense of "perverse", he had at first speculated that perhaps the stream had been at flood stage when the first explorers came to it, or someone had fallen into it and inadvertently named it with an ensuing ill-tempered outburst. But then Fried consulted with an expert on the New Netherland era, who told him that if that strongly pejorative meaning had truly been intended, a word more fully conveying that sense like slecht or quaad (spelled kwaad in modern Dutch) would have been used instead.

This led him to propose that perhaps the name merely indicated an inaccuracy. "Pakanasink" had been used since 1684 to refer to the land around the Verkeerder Kill's lowest reaches, where Ulsterville is now, and by extension the Shawangunk Kill was also known during that time as Pakanasink Creek. It was possible that a later group of explorers had reached the area, and originally believed the stream flowing in from the west to be the Pakanasink, only to later learn that that name was already used for the Shawangunk above the confluence. They might, he reasoned, have then begun referring to that western tributary as "the wrong brook", a name that might well have persisted after the distinction no longer needed to be made.

During the 19th century the stream took on a different alternate name, one that persists today, according to Fried. Locals began calling it Kaidy Kill or Cater Kill, finding the full name too challenging. An 1899 map gives both the long and short names for the stream. This created some confusion with Kaaterskill Creek, a tributary of the Hudson that flows down from the Catskill Escarpment in Greene County to the north—one guidebook author from that time describes Verkeerderkill Falls as being 240 feet (73 m) tall, the height of Kaaterskill Falls. The shorter name was so common, Fried recalls, that a woman he interviewed for his research who had been born in nearby Ellenville early in the 20th century recalled it always being called Kaidy Kill and did not even know the stream had a full name until he showed it to her on a map.

== Ecology ==
Since it is surrounded by extensive forests along most of its course, the Verkeerder Kill is relatively unpolluted. New York's Department of Environmental Conservation has designated it Class A, suitable for all types of human use including consumption. In 2002 a macroinvertebrate study at the Ulsterville Road bridge a short distance above the Shawangunk Kill found a diverse population of species there and no signs that the water's ability to support aquatic life had been impacted.

== Crossings ==
- Verkeerderkill Falls Trail (part of Long Path) via ford
- Indian Springs Road/Oregon Trail
- Indian Springs Camp Road
- Forestdale Lane
- New York State Route 52
- Johns Estate Road
- Burlingham Road (Ulster County Route 7)
- Ulsterville Road
- Pirog Road

== See also ==
- List of rivers in New York

Other tributaries of the Shawangunk Kill:

- Dwaar Kill
- Little Shawangunk Kill
