= Shawangunk =

Shawangunk (/ˈʃɒnɡʌm/ SHON-gum) may refer to:

== In New York ==
- Shawangunk, New York, a town in Ulster County
- Shawangunk Correctional Facility, in Ulster County
- Shawangunk Grasslands National Wildlife Refuge, in Ulster County
- Shawangunk Kill, a tributary of the Wallkill River
- Shawangunk Ridge, also known as the Shawangunk Mountains or The Gunks

== In Michigan ==
- the former name of Charity Island

== In geology ==
- Shawangunk Formation
