= Verkeerder Kill Falls =

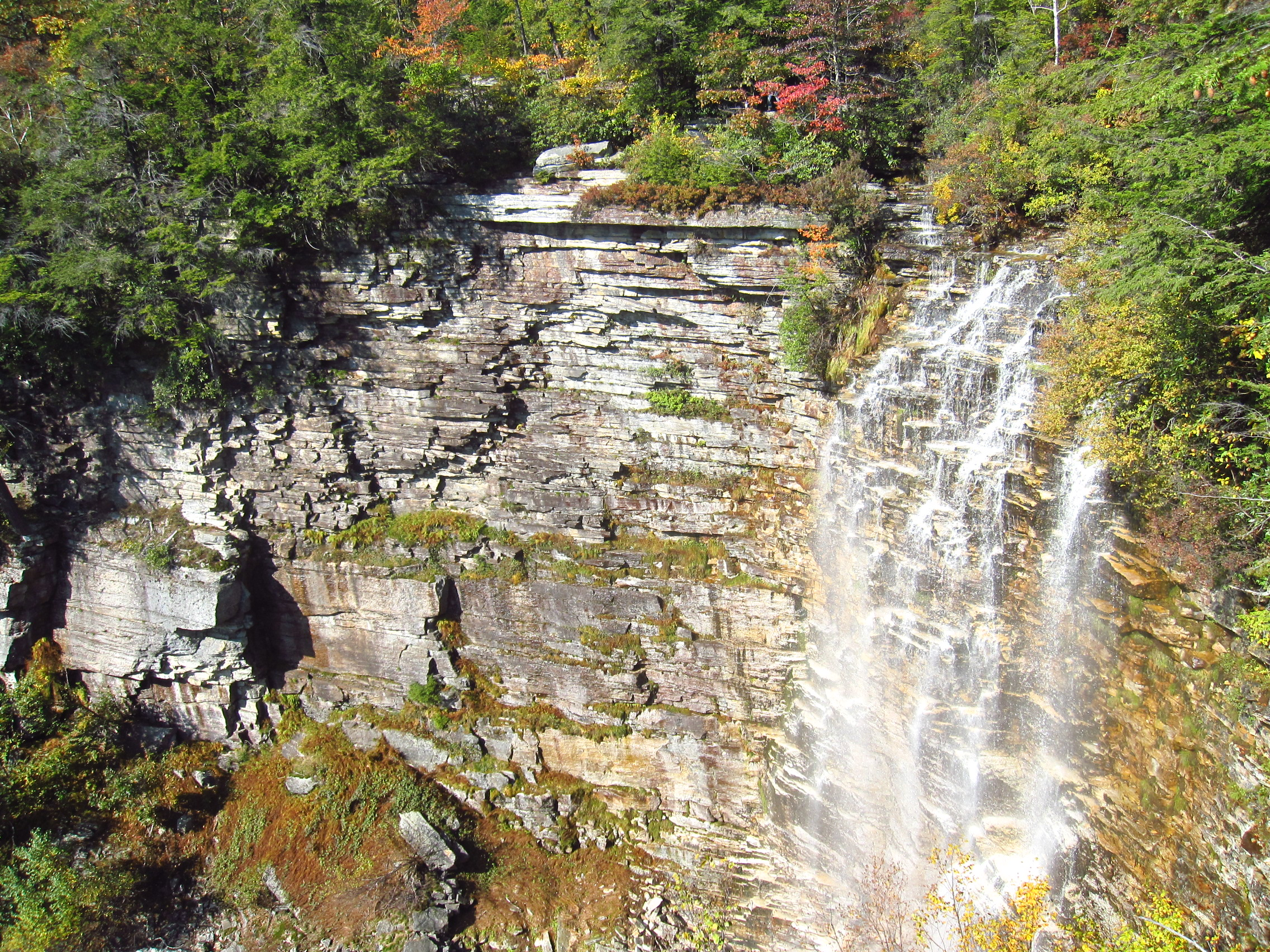
- Verkeerder Kill Falls
- Interactive map of Verkeerder Kill Falls
- Location: Ulster County, New York
- Coordinates: 41°41′06″N 74°19′41″W
- Elevation: 1,713 feet (522 m)
- Total height: 79 feet (24 m)
- Watercourse: Verkeerder Kill

Verkeerder Kill Falls is the highest waterfall in Sam's Point Preserve in the Shawangunk Mountains in the town of Shawangunk, Ulster County, New York.

The waterfall has often been reported as 187 feet (57 m) in height. However, a 2025 measurement organized by local historian and naturalist Marc B. Fried determined the height to be 79 feet (24 m), based on inclinometer measurements and trigonometric calculation.

The falls are accessible via a three-mile-long (4.8 km) trail that branches from the main trail in Sam's Point Preserve and forms part of the Long Path. The waterfall is named after the stream that feeds it. It may be viewed from both the base and from above near the edge of a rocky outcrop.

Verkeerder Kill Falls is known for its white plume during periods of high runoff. The surrounding terrain is characterized by dwarf pitch pine barrens typical of the Shawangunk Ridge, with views toward the Catskills, Taconics, Poconos, and Kittatinny Mountains on clear days.

== See also ==
- List of waterfalls
