= Lake Maratanza =

Lake in Ulster County, New York, USA

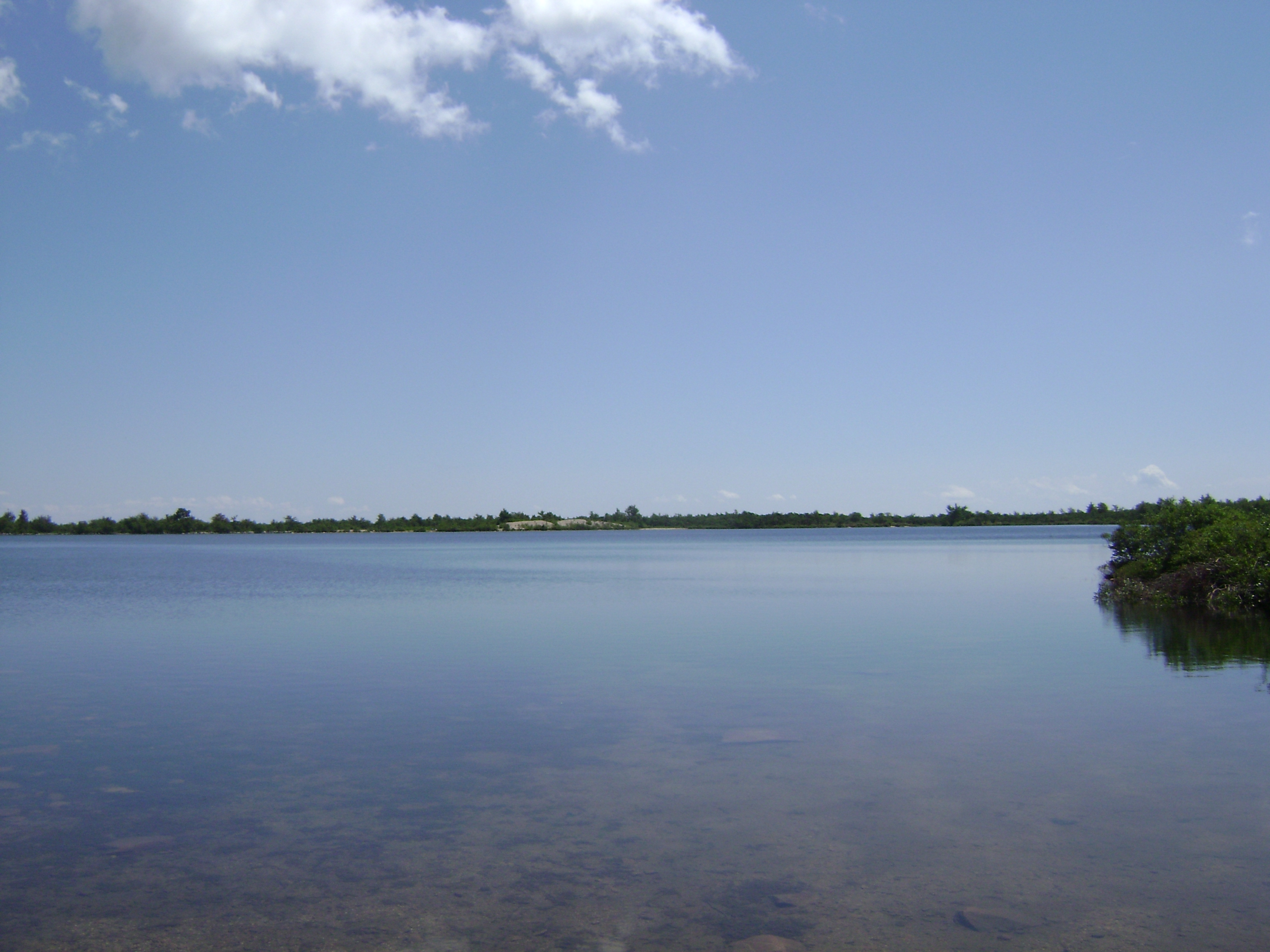
- Lake Maratanza viewed from the west shore in July, 2011.

- Location within New York
- Location: Wawarsing, New York
- Coordinates: 41°40′49″N 74°21′10″W
- Basin countries: United States
- Surface area: 50 acres (20 ha)
- Surface elevation: 684 m (2,244 ft)

Lake Maratanza is the highest lake in New York's Shawangunk Ridge at 2,245 feet (684 m) above sea level. It is within Sam's Point Preserve.

The lake is dammed and supplies drinking water to Ellenville. The outlet brook drains to the other side of the ridge, into the Verkeerder Kill, a tributary of the Shawangunk Kill and by extension the Wallkill River.

== See also ==
- List of dams and reservoirs in New York
