= Sam's Point Preserve =

Nature preserve in Ulster County, New York, US

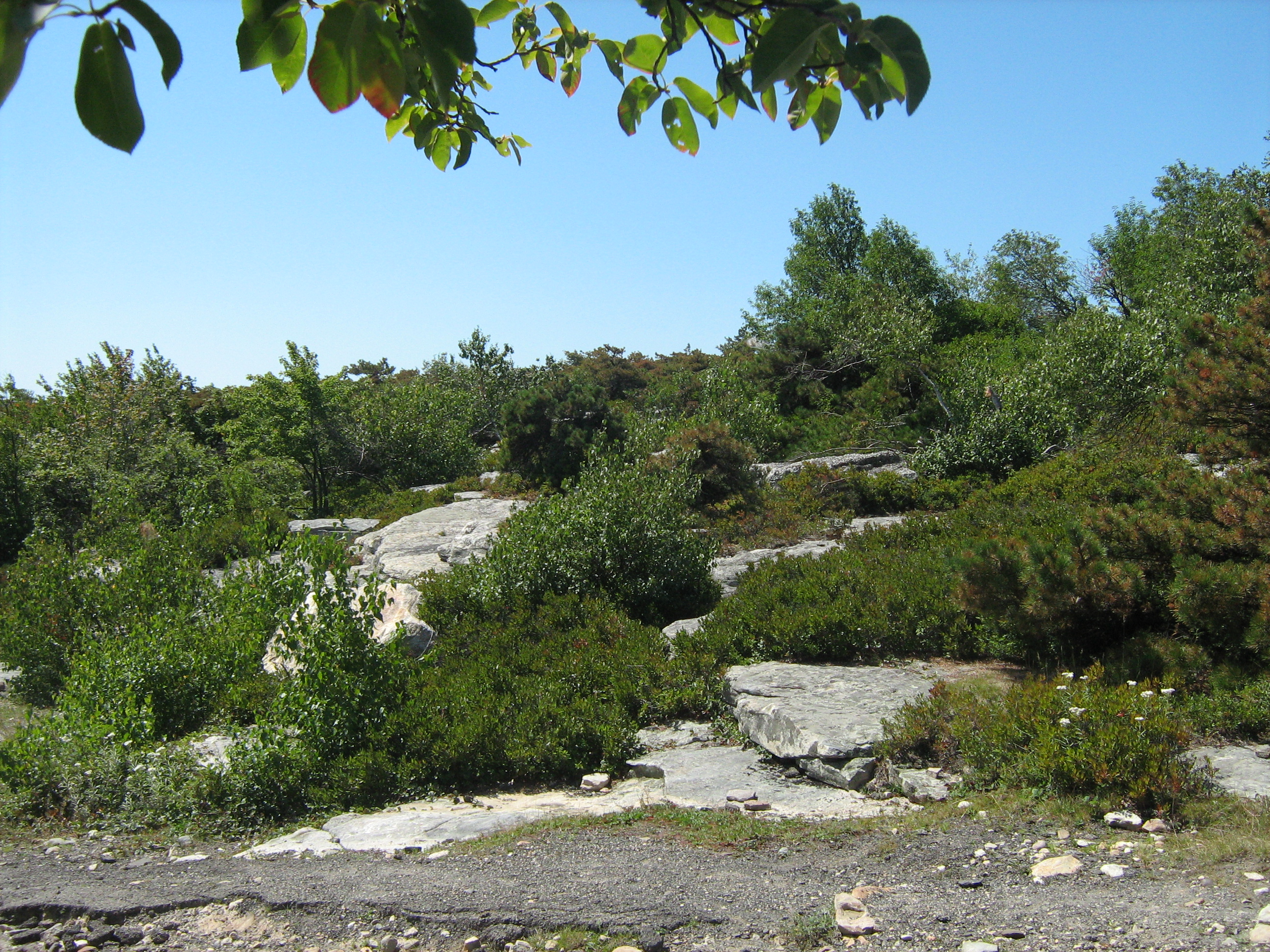
- Pine barrens

- Location within New York
- Location: Ulster County, New York
- Nearest city: Ellenville
- Coordinates: 41°40′09″N 74°21′19″W
- Area: 4,600 acres (19 km^{2})

Sam's Point Preserve, or Sam's Point Dwarf Pine Ridge Preserve, is a 4,600-acre (19 km^{2}) preserve in Ulster County on the highest point (2,289 feet [698 m]) of the Shawangunk Ridge in New York, on the Wawarsing, New York-Shawangunk town line. It is owned and managed by the New York State Office of Parks, Recreation and Historic Preservation after having previously been managed by The Nature Conservancy. Its unique environment features dwarf pitch pine trees along the ridgetop. Located within the park is Lake Maratanza, the highest lake on the ridge, and the Ellenville Fault Ice Caves. Parking reservations are required April 15 through November 15 on weekends and holidays.

== History ==
The name derives from a folktale in which a noted Spanish settler named Samuel Gunsalus, pursued by Indians, jumped off the cliff to avoid capture and miraculously survived the drop with the trees breaking his fall, around the time of the French and Indian War. Roads throughout the preserve were built as fire roads in the 1930s by the Civilian Conservation Corps.

The land was once owned by the nearby village of Ellenville to protect its watershed and partly by a company which offered tours of the ice caves. The Open Space Institute, working with The Nature Conservancy, bought it with assistance from the Lila Acheson and Dewitt Wallace Fund for the Hudson Highlands, after the village considered selling the land to developers.

In 2005, the Preserve opened the Sam’s Point Conservation Center with education facilities, exhibits and a gift shop. A parking fee of $10 per vehicle is charged.

Management of the preserve was transferred to the New York State Office of Parks, Recreation and Historic Preservation and the Palisades Interstate Park Commission in April 2015, after having been managed by The Nature Conservancy since 1996. The preserve is currently managed as part of Minnewaska State Park Preserve.

=== April 2016 fire ===
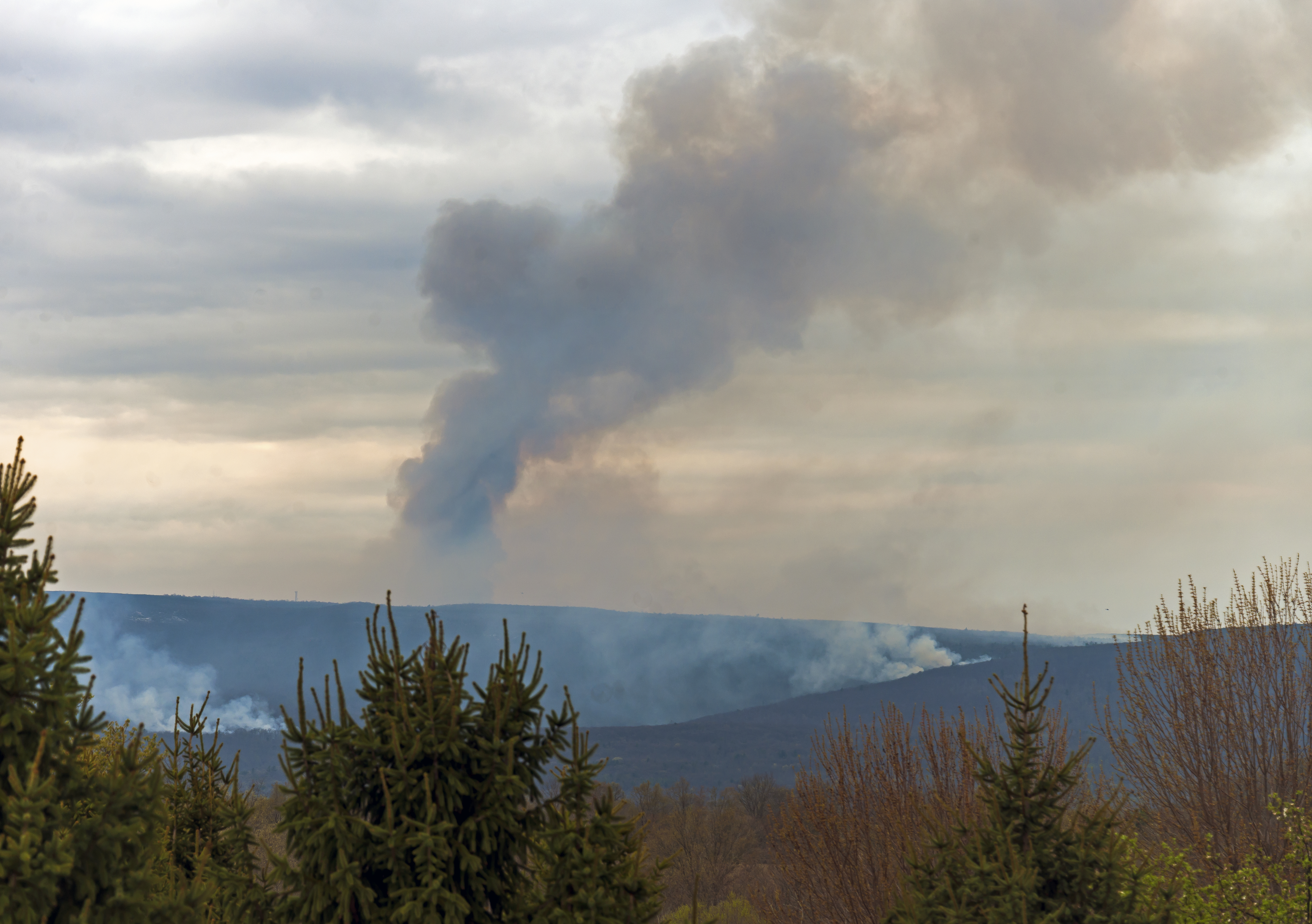
Smoke from the April 2016 fire

In late April 2016, a fire of unknown origin burned 2,028 acres (8.21 km^{2}) of the park and nearby woodlands. Emanating from the Verkeederkill Falls trail the fire quickly spread northwest across the plateau as well as adjacent terrains. Containing the fire required nearly a week of effort from over 300 responders from local and state agencies; no structural damage and only minor injuries were reported. Although much of Minnewaska State Park reopened soon after the blaze, the Sam's Point section remained completely closed until Memorial Day weekend; at that time, only selected trails at Sam's Point were re-opened to the public to prevent the introduction of invasive species to the recovering landscape.

As a historically fire-adapted ecosystem, much of the vegetation at Sam's Point responded positively in the wake of the fire. However, an abundance of fuel due to reduced fire frequency in recent years led to an intense, fast-moving blaze that did not completely burn through accumulated debris, which may inhibit the regeneration of the park's pitch pine.

== Ellenville Fault Ice Caves ==
The Ellenville Fault Ice Caves is the largest known open fault in the United States with corresponding ice caves. As a result of the cool microclimate, ice is present throughout the year and more northern plants such as black spruce, hemlock, mountain ash, and creeping snowberry, and bryophytes such as Isopterygium distichaceum are able to survive. It was designated a National Natural Landmark in November 1967.

There are hiking trails to the ice caves which are open in the summer.

== Trails ==
The Long Path long-distance hiking trail crosses it, eventually reaching VerKeerderkill Falls. A branch leads to Sam's Point (with a view of land for many miles, sometimes as far as High Point in New Jersey), and another to the ice caves, with solar powered lights. Visitors who want to get to Sam's Point have to go through Cragsmoor.

== Gallery ==
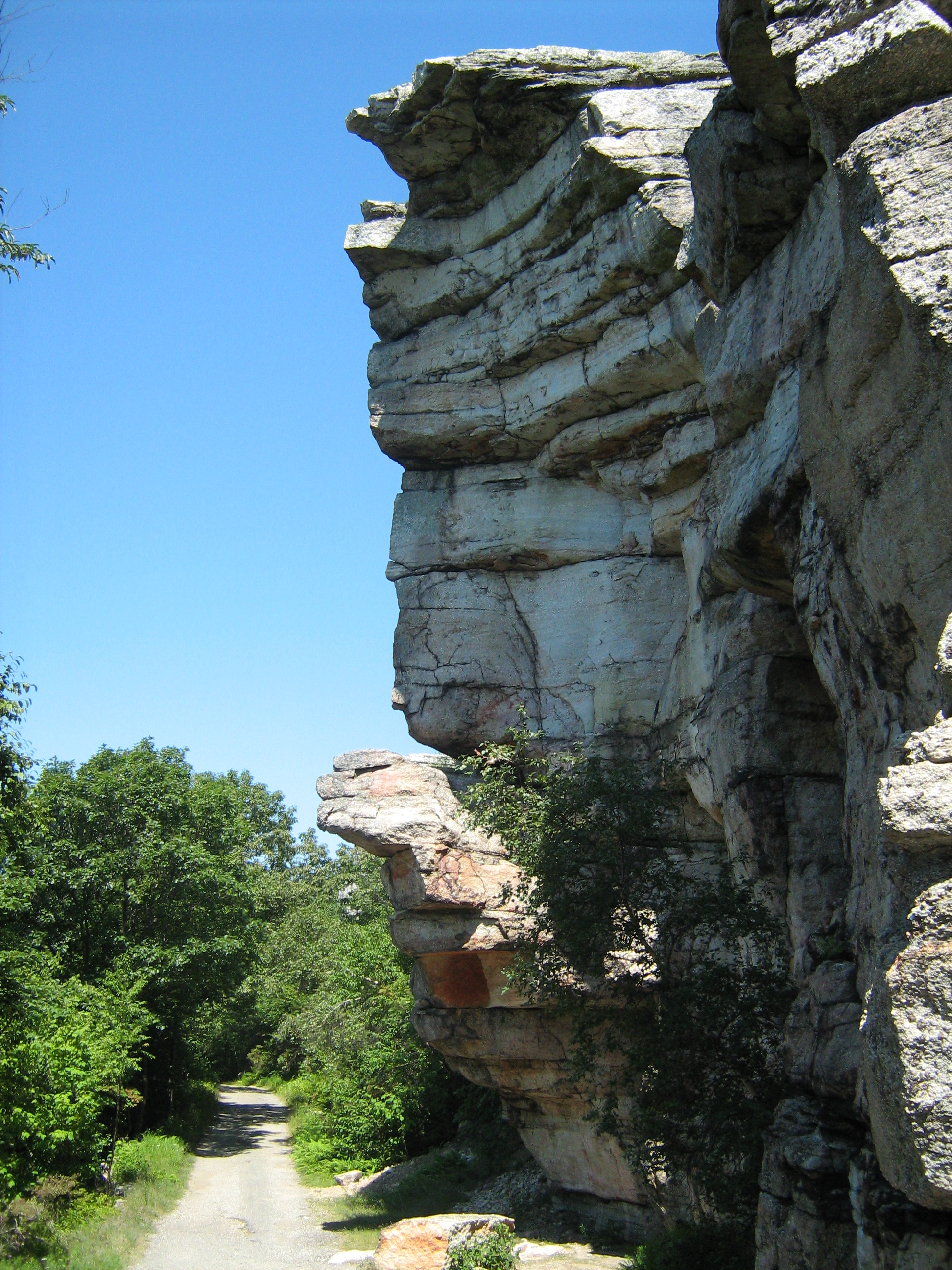
Looking down the access road, just under the Point

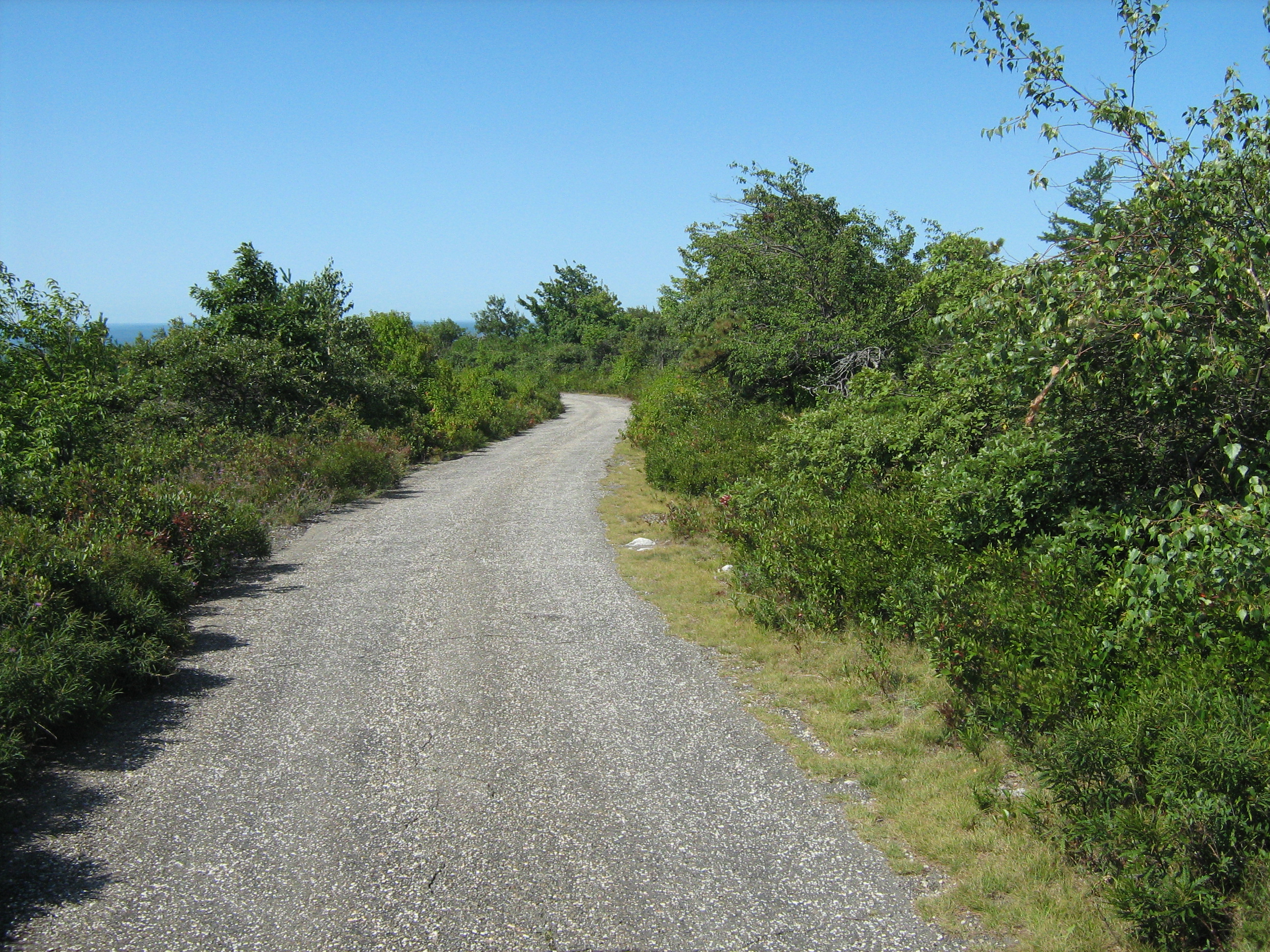
A portion of the CCC fire road

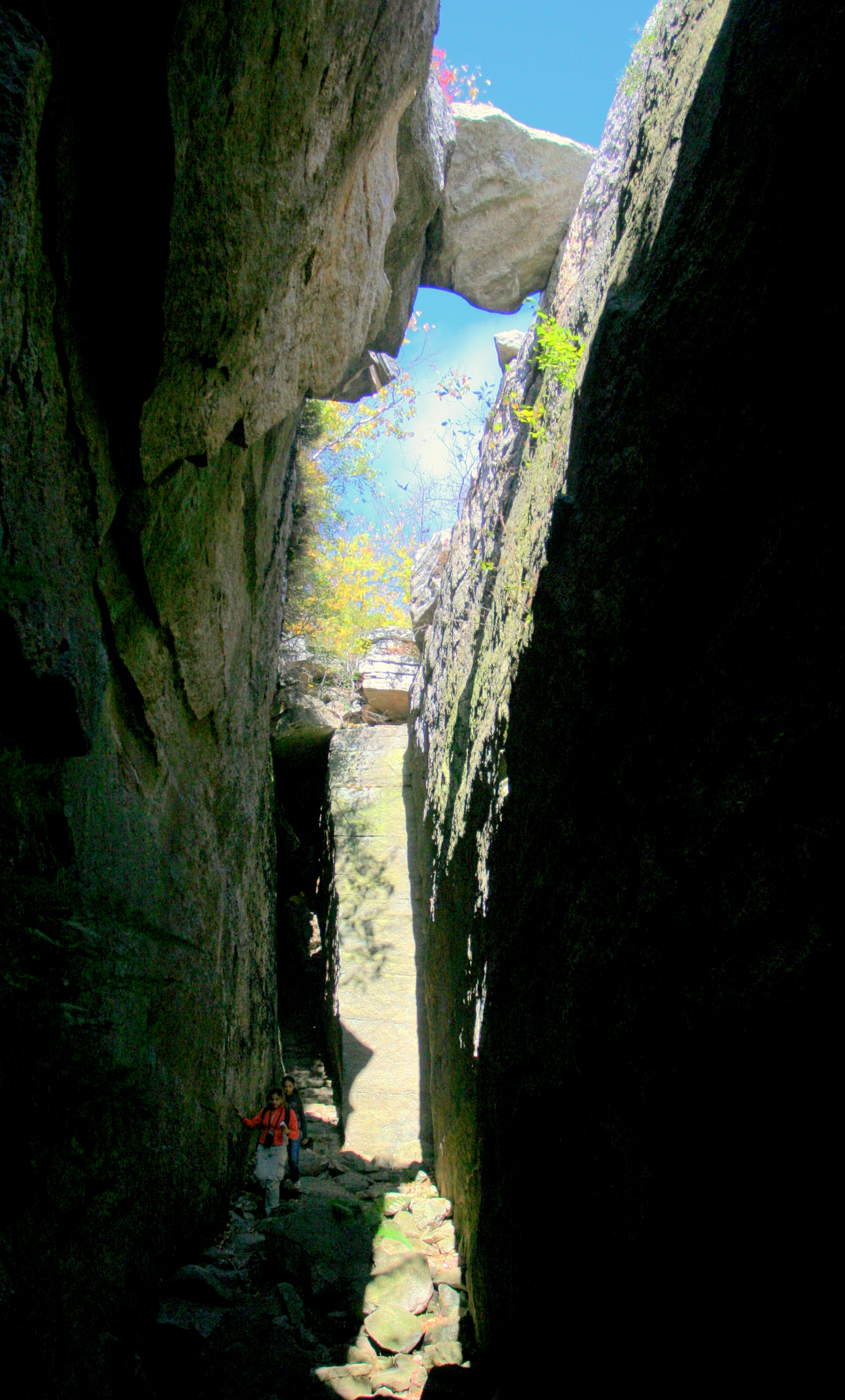
Hiking to the Ice Caves

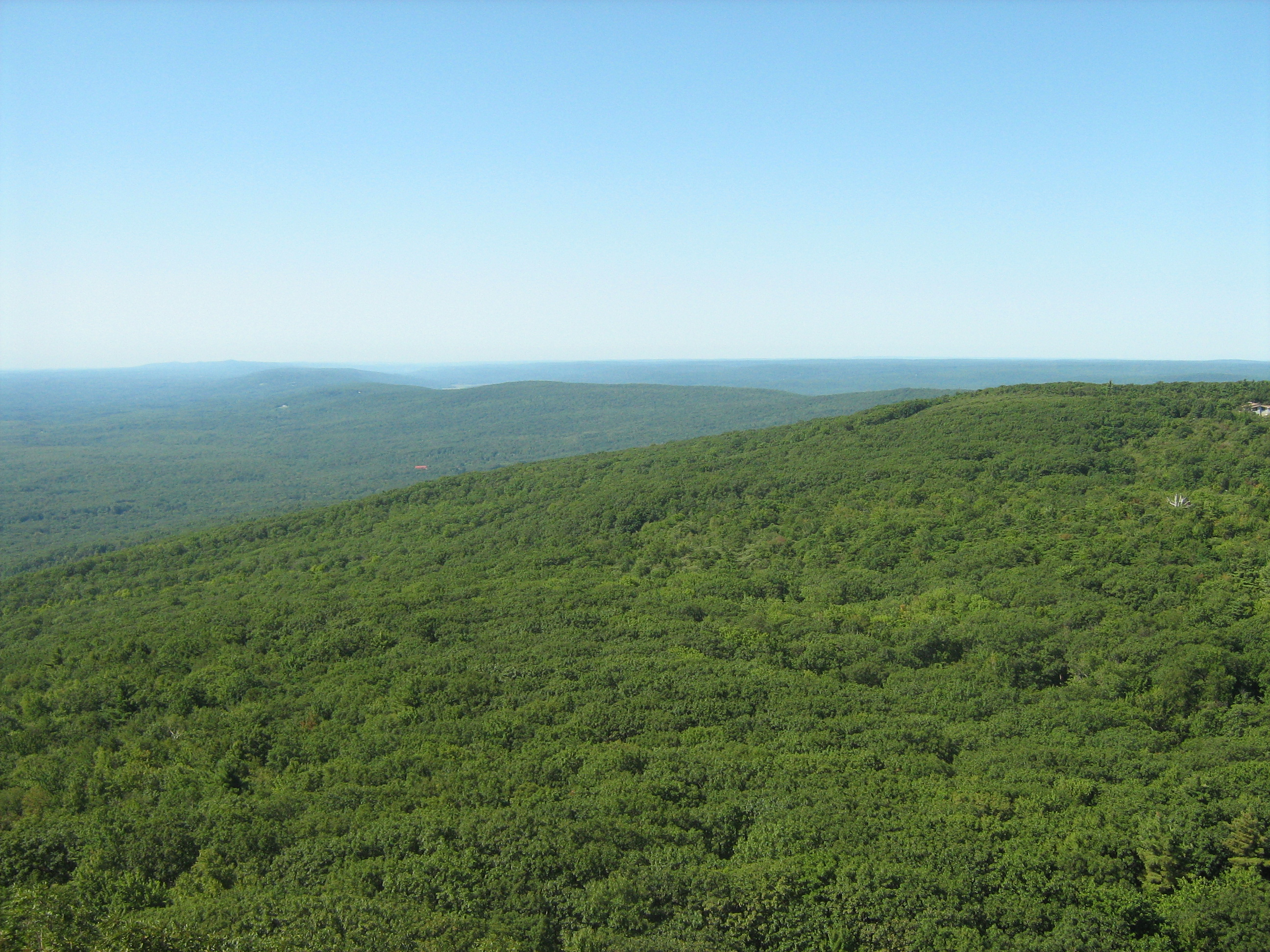
View from the Point, looking to the southeast

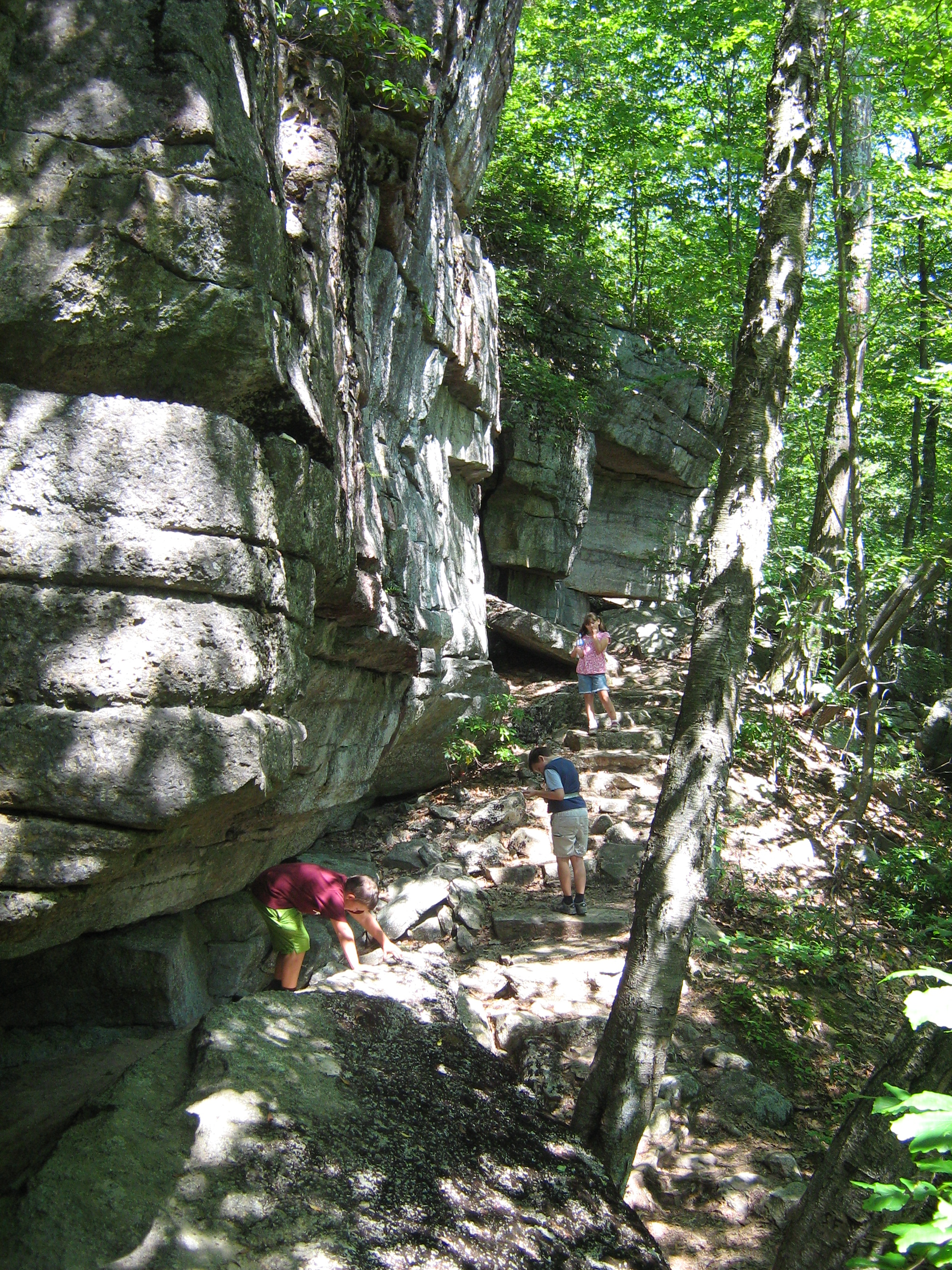
Along the trail to the Ice Caves

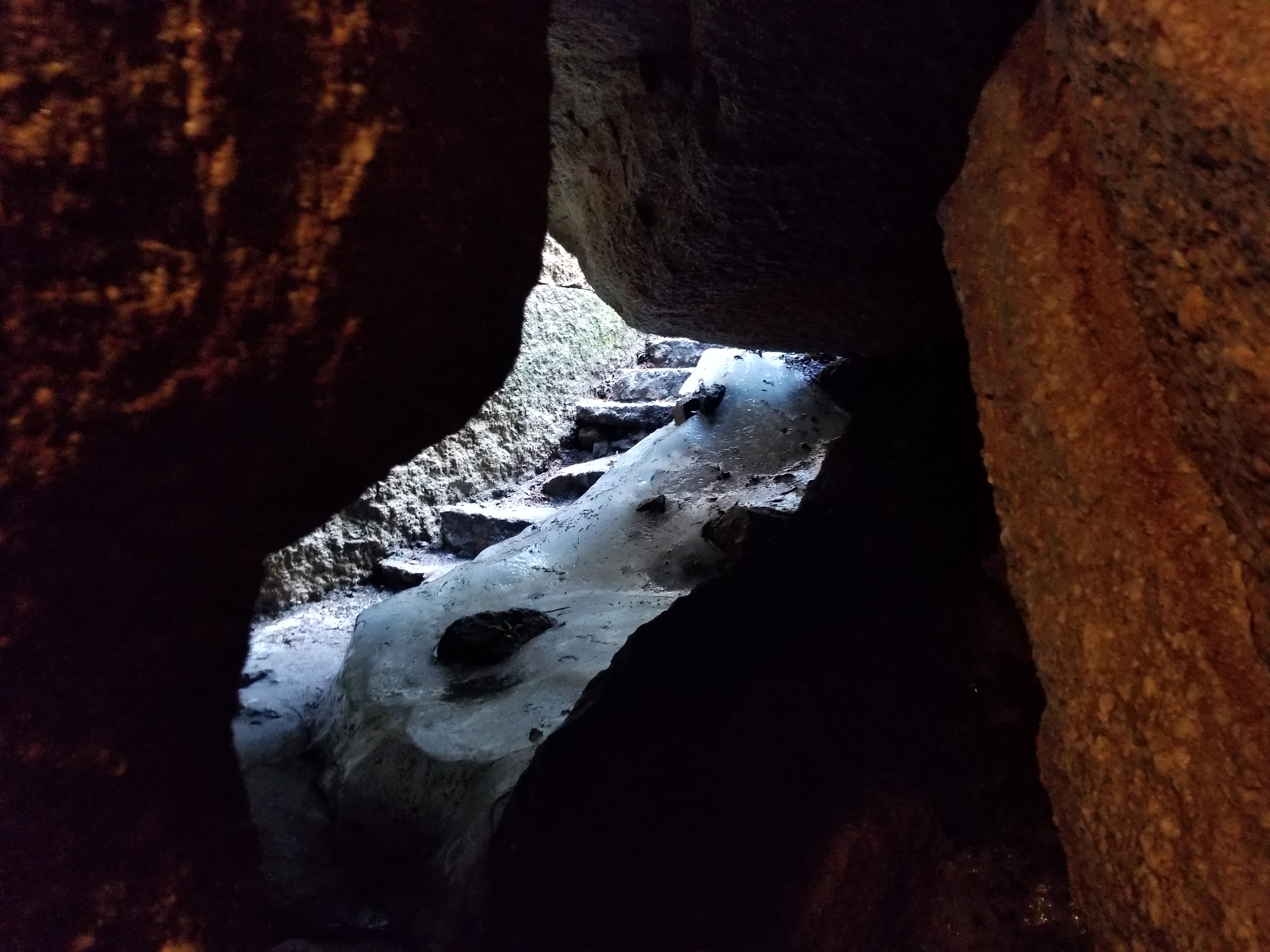
Ice inside the Ice Caves as seen in June 2018

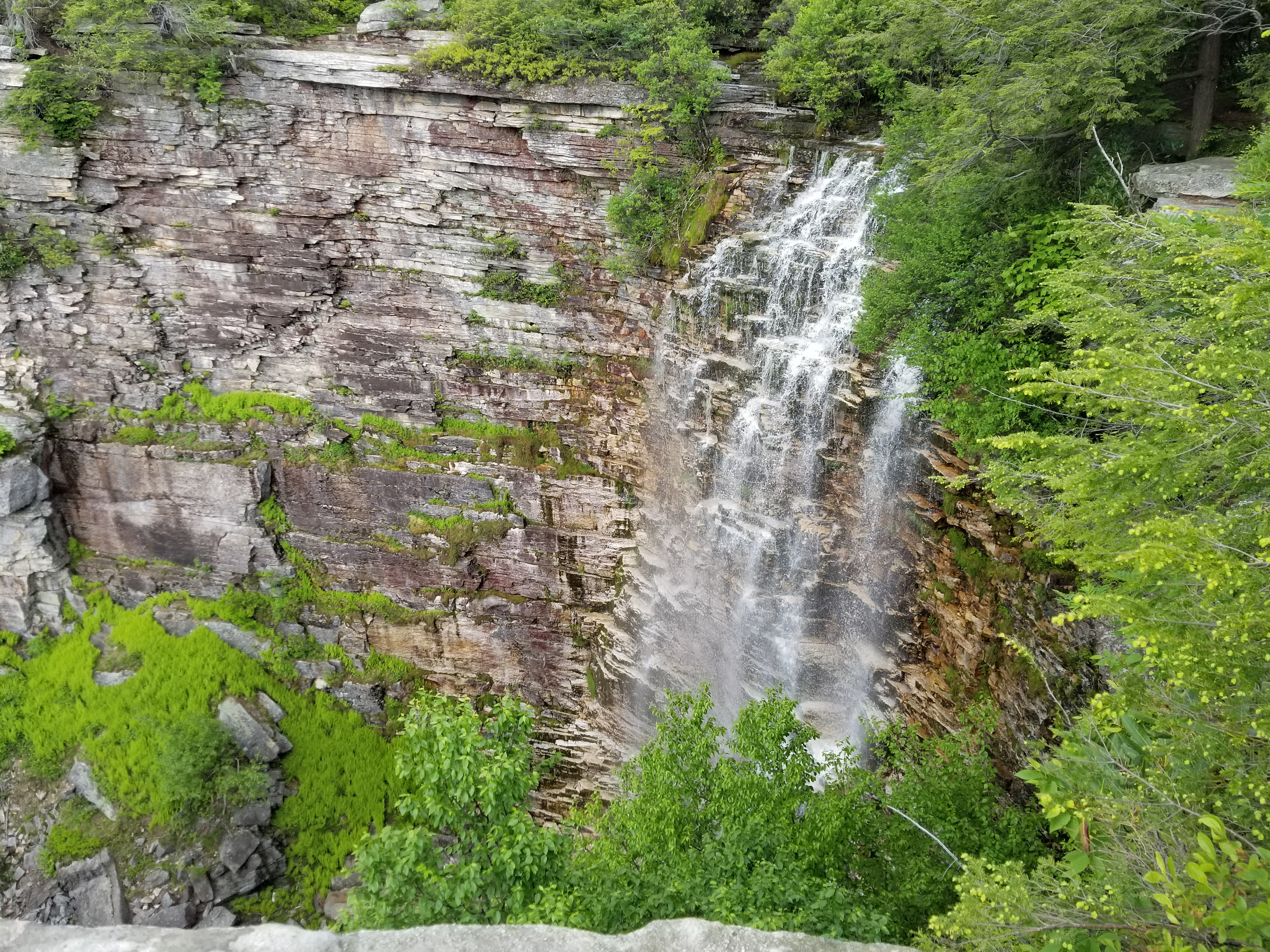
Verkeerderkill Falls

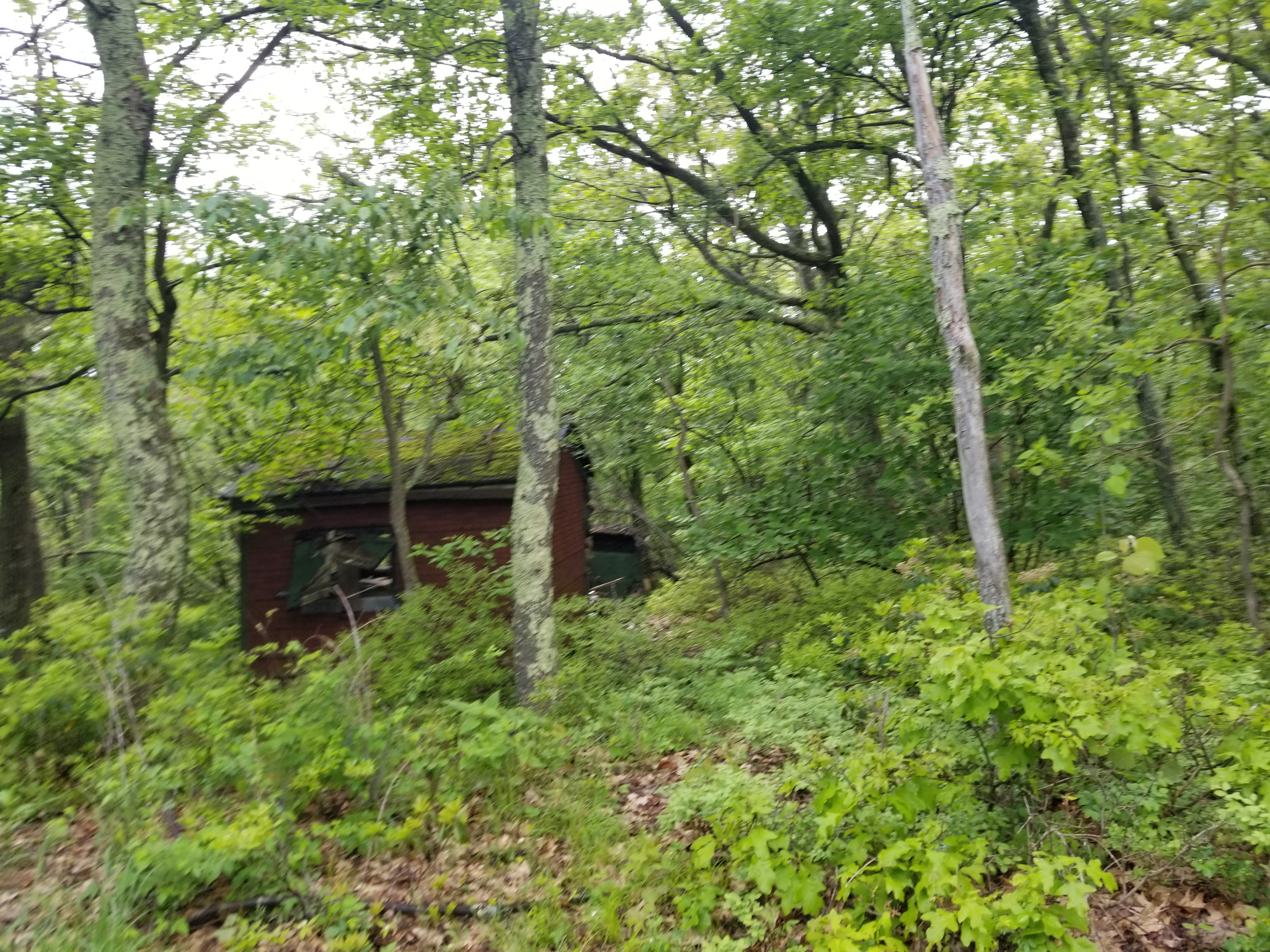
Abandoned berry picker cabin

== See also ==
- List of National Natural Landmarks in New York
