= Watchtower, New York =

- CDP
- Location in Ulster County and the state of New York.

- Location within New York
- Coordinates: 41°38′16″N 74°15′37″W
- Country: United States
- State: New York
- County: Ulster

Area
  - Total: 0.71 sq mi (1.84 km^{2})
  - Land: 0.71 sq mi (1.84 km^{2})
  - Water: 0 sq mi (0.00 km^{2})
- Elevation: 344 ft (105 m)

Population (2020)
  - Total: 1,709
  - Density: 2,404.5/sq mi (928.39/km^{2})
- Time zone: UTC-5 (EST)
  - Summer (DST): UTC-4 (EDT)
- ZIP code: 12589
- Area code: 845
- FIPS code: 36-78487
- GNIS feature ID: 2631241

Watchtower is a hamlet (and census-designated place) located in the Town of Shawangunk, Ulster County, New York, United States. The population was 1,709 at the 2020 census.

It is owned and operated by the Watchtower Society (a legal entity of Jehovah's Witnesses) and has been in operation since 1963.

== Demographics ==
Historical population
Census	Pop.	Note	%±
2010	2,381		—
2020	1,709		−28.2%
U.S. Decennial Census

== Education ==
The CDP is divided between the Pine Bush Central School District and the Wallkill Central School District.
