= Dwaar Kill (Shawangunk Kill tributary) =

River in the United States of America

Coordinates: 41.63509°N 74.25043°W

The Dwaar Kill is a 7.8-mile-long (12.6 km) tributary of the Shawangunk Kill in Ulster County, New York, in the United States.

The source of the Dwaar Kill is located in the Minnewaska State Park Preserve.

== See also ==
- List of rivers of New York
