= Little Shawangunk Kill =

River in New York, United States

Coordinates: 41°30′56.34″N 74°28′0.57″W

The Little Shawangunk Kill is a tributary of the Shawangunk Kill in Orange County, New York in the United States. It rises in the southwest corner of Wallkill and flows northward.
