= Shawangunk Kill =

Tributary of the Wallkill River in the U.S. state of New York

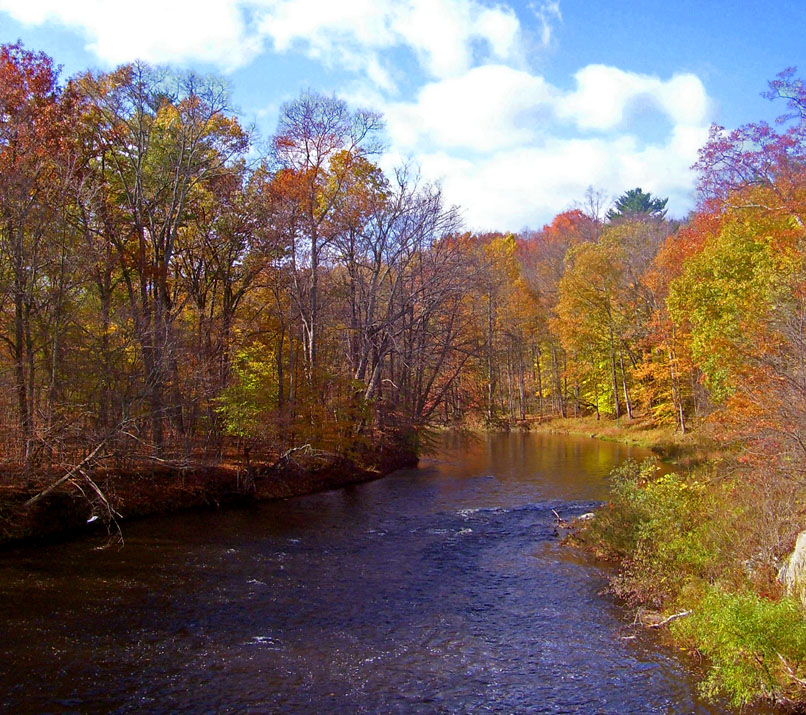
- The Shawangunk Kill where it divides Orange and Ulster counties

Location
- Country: United States
- State: New York
- Region: Hudson Valley
- Counties: Orange, Sullivan, Ulster
- Towns: Greenville, Mamakating, Wawayanda, Wallkill, Crawford, Shawangunk, Gardiner

Physical characteristics
- Source: Unnamed pond
  - location: Greenville, New York
  - coordinates: 41.3931°N 74.6029°W
  - elevation: 1,240 ft (380 m)
- Mouth: Wallkill River
  - location: W of Gardiner, New York
  - coordinates: 41.6835°N 74.1652°W
  - elevation: 180 ft (55 m)
- Length: 47 mi (76 km)
- Basin size: 147 mi^{2} (380 km^{2})
- Discharge
  - average: 138 cu ft/s (3.9 m^{3}/s)

The Shawangunk Kill is a 47.2-mile-long (76.0 km) stream that flows northward through Orange, Sullivan and Ulster counties, New York, in the United States. It is the largest tributary of the Wallkill River.

It takes its name from the neighboring Shawangunk Ridge, where it rises in the town of Greenville, then flowing down into the valley. For part of its length, it forms the northwestern boundary of Orange County, with first Sullivan and then Ulster County along the other side.

== Course ==
From its source in Greenville, the Shawangunk flows steadily northeastward to Mill Pond, near Mount Hope, by which point it has already lost almost half its original elevation. It passes through fields and woods east of Otisville. At the hamlet of New Vernon, it becomes the Orange-Sullivan county line and shortly thereafter receives its first named tributary, the Little Shawangunk Kill.

It begins to widen a bit at Bloomingburg, and north of that community it is crossed by NY 17, the busiest road along the kill. Several miles to the north, the confluence of another tributary, the Platte Kill, marks the point where Orange, Sullivan and Ulster counties come together as the stream bends slightly towards a more eastern heading.

Pine Bush eventually rises on the east, and a few more miles north of that hamlet the kill becomes the exclusive property of Ulster County when the boundary returns to land at Orange County's northernmost point. The Shawangunk continues to meander into a wider and wider valley, populated mostly with farms and woodlots, the mountain ridge spreading across the western sky. Finally, it curves due east and joins the Wallkill just south of US 44-NY 55 near Gardiner.

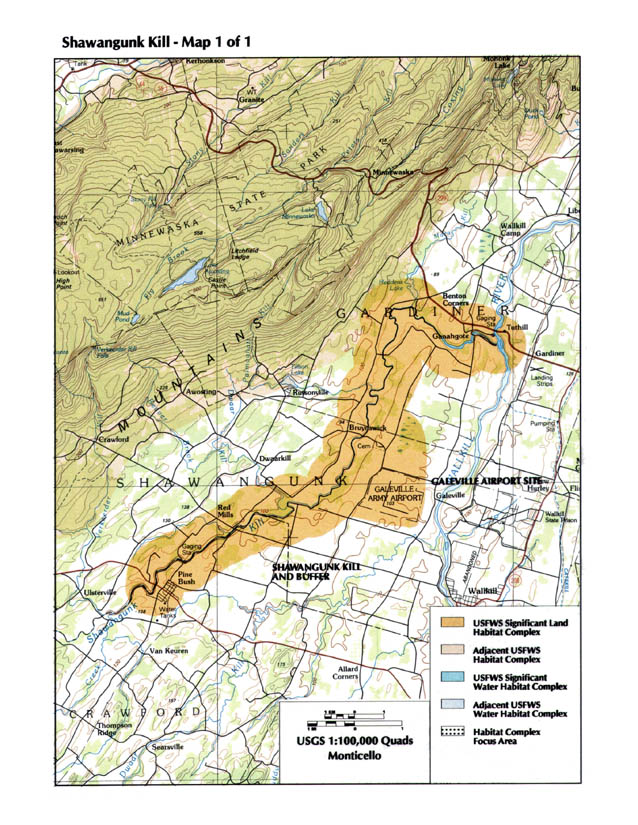
The lower Shawangunk habitat region as identified by the U.S. Fish and Wildlife Service

== Ecology ==
In the early 1990s, the U.S. Fish and Wildlife Service, when it was researching the fate of the former Galeville air base site (now Shawangunk Grasslands National Wildlife Refuge) found that the lower Shawangunk (from its mouth to Pine Bush) supports an unusually diverse plant and animal community for the region due to the absence of any serious impoundment along the upper river. It reported no less than six species of freshwater mussels, including the rare swollen wedge mussel, and 31 species of fish. Among the latter were the rare Notropis amoenus (comely shiner), Notropis stramineus (sand shiner), Percina caproedes (logperch), Lepomis auritis (redbreasted sunfish) and Noturus insignis (margined madtom).

The study found that the region supports the only known community of Diarrhena obovata (beakgrass) in the state. Other rare plants in the lower Shawangunk Kill include threadfoot on submerged ledges, sharp-winged monkeyflower, wingstem and redrooted flatsedge along the stream itself, with Davis' sedge, swamp agrimony, Aster vimeneus (small white aster) and violet bushclover joining the beakgrass in the floodplains.

Due to the minimal development (mostly agricultural) within much of its watershed, there is very little pollution. In 2015 the town council members of Wallkill, through which five miles (8.0 km) of the stream flows, enacted a law to protect the Shawangunk Kill. It bars any construction (including roads), clear cutting, dumping or septic systems within 100 feet (30 m) of the high water mark. Crawford, to the north, also has in place limits on new construction and rebuilding in the stream's vicinity, and in Mount Hope much of the land around it is owned by the municipality.

== Geology ==
The river bedrock is predominantly shale, covered by silty loam soils left behind by past glaciation. The stream bed itself varies from solid rock to particulates such as gravel, sand and clay. Geologically, the Shawangunk valley is part of the Ridge-and-Valley Appalachians, typified by the Shawangunk Ridge to the west and the lower Hoagerburgh Ridge to the east.

== Crossings ==
North to south, going upriver

- Albany Post Road (Ulster County Route 9)
- McKinstry Road (Ulster County Route 7A)
- Hoagerburgh Road (Ulster County Route 18)
- Wallkill Avenue (Town of Crawford, Orange County)/Bruyn Turnpike (Town of Shawangunk, Ulster County)
- Hardenbugh Road
- NY 52
- Ulsterville Road
- Crawford Street
- Orange County Route 48/Sullivan County Route 66
- Petticoat Lane
- NY 17
- Orange County 76/Sullivan County 171
- Spruce Road
- New Vernon Road (Orange County Route 18)
- Shoddy Hollow Road
- Metro-North Port Jervis Line
- Carboy Road
- NY 211
- Mount Hope Road (Orange County Route 11)
- Guymard Turnpike (Orange County Route 24)
- Kohler Road
- Eatontown Road
- Fort Van Tyle Road
- Springbrook Road
- Mullock Road

== Tributaries ==
- Dwaar Kill
- Platte Kill
- Tomy Kill
- Pakansink Creek
- Verkeerder Kill
- Little Shawangunk Kill

== See also ==
- List of New York rivers
