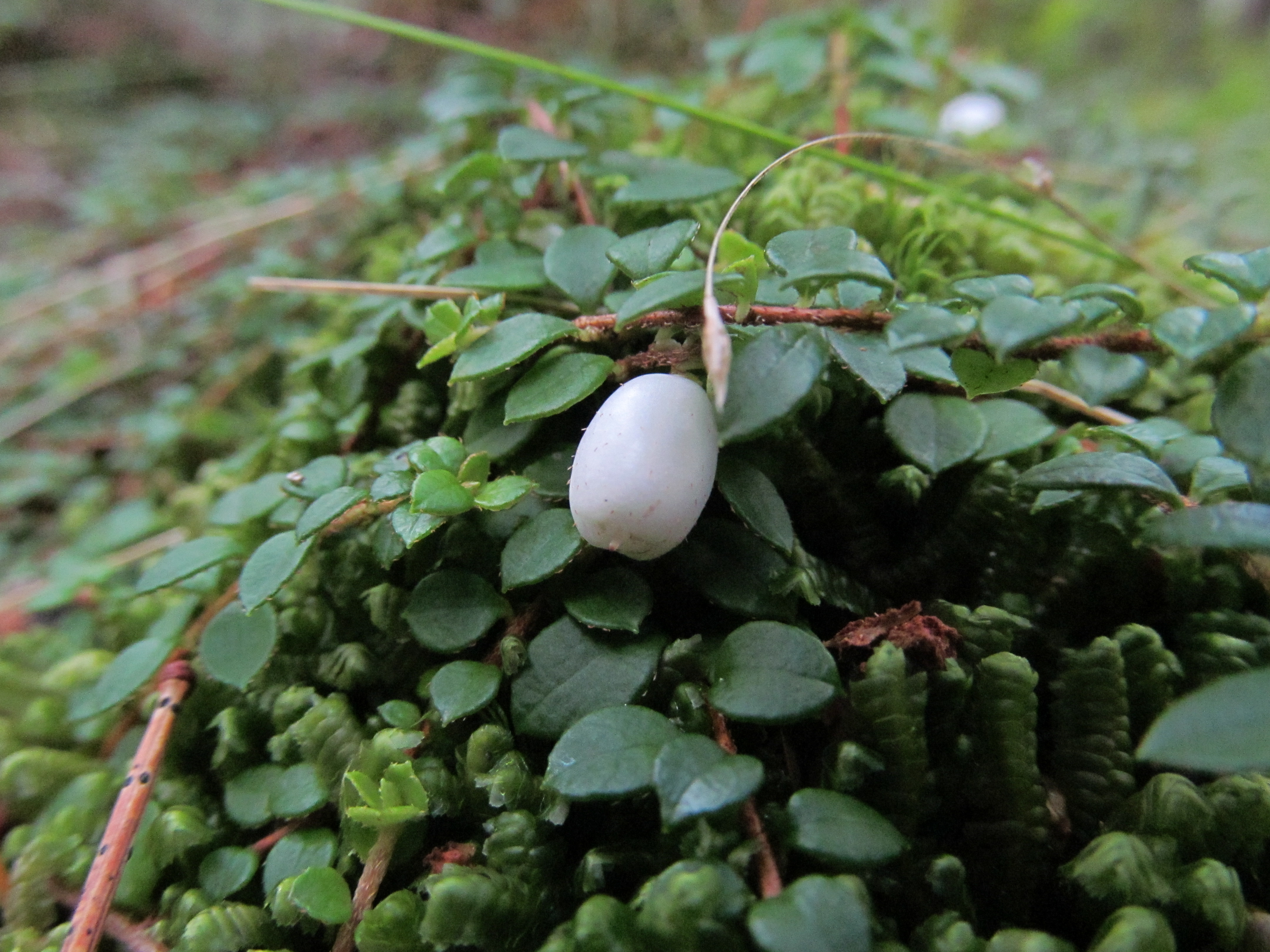
- Foliage and ripe fruit

Conservation status
- Least Concern (IUCN 3.1)

Scientific classification
- Kingdom: Plantae
- Clade: Tracheophytes
- Clade: Angiosperms
- Clade: Eudicots
- Clade: Asterids
- Order: Ericales
- Family: Ericaceae
- Genus: Gaultheria
- Species: G. hispidula

Binomial name
- Gaultheria hispidula (L.) Muhl. ex Bigelow

Synonyms
- Chiogenes hispidula Vaccinium hispidulum

= Gaultheria hispidula =

Species of plant

Herbarium specimen

Gaultheria hispidula, commonly known as the creeping snowberry or moxie-plum, and known to Mi'kmaq tribes of Newfoundland as manna teaberry, is a perennial spreading ground-level vine of the heath family Ericaceae. It is native to North America and produces small white edible berries. It fruits from August to September. Its leaves and berries taste and smell like wintergreen. The species epithet hispidula refers to the bristles on the stems and leaves.

== Description ==
Gaultheria hispidula is an evergreen prostrate shrub that forms a mat of stems and leaves that can reach 1 m (3 1/2 ft) in diameter and only 10 centimetres (3.9 in) high. The small leaves, which are under 1 cm (0.39 in) long, are arranged alternately along the stems. The stem and undersides of the leaves are covered with stiff hairs. The pale green-white flowers typically bloom between May and June, with fruits ripening between August and September.

The flowers develop on short, nodding stalks in the axils of the leaves. Each bell-shaped flower is composed of four sepals and four petals that are fused at the base. The petals end in slightly flared lobes. Like other species of Gaultheria, the flowers are bisexual, containing eight short stamens that do not extend past the corolla.

The fruits are capsules, surrounded by a persistent, fleshy white calyx giving it them the appearance of a small white berry. The surface of the fruits are also covered by short dark-red bristles. The fruit is edible and has an acidic, or wintergreen-like, taste.

== Distribution and habitat ==
Gaultheria hispidula grows in acidic and neutral soils in open woodland and forest verges, particularly on wet ground such as in or on the edge of bogs, often near tree stumps. Its original range spread from far northern Canada to as far south as North Carolina, but it has been extirpated from the southerly portions of its original range.

== Ecology ==
It is pollinated by solitary bees, bumblebees, bee-flies, and hoverflies, while chipmunks and deer mice spread the seed.

== Conservation status ==
Like most plants in North America, deforestation and competition with invasive ornamentals (especially shade-loving groundcovers, such as English ivy or winter creeper commonly sold at garden centers) affect the creeping snowberry significantly. As a result, it has been extirpated from some of its original range and classified as rare in several states. Despite this, its international status has been evaluated as secure. This is because it is still quite common in its more northerly range of greater Canada. However, deforestation and exotic invasion are continuing problems that affect all forest species in both Canada and the United States.

It is listed as endangered in Maryland and New Jersey, as threatened in Rhode Island, as sensitive in Washington, as rare in Pennsylvania, as presumed extirpated in Ohio, and as a species of special concern in Connecticut.

== Uses ==
The Algonquin people use an infusion of the leaves as a tonic for overeating. They also use the fruit as food. The Anticosti use it as a sedative, and the Mi'kmaq decoct the leaves or the whole plant for an unspecified purpose. The Ojibwa people use the leaves to make a beverage. Etymologist Frederic Cassidy hypothesized that such medicinal uses of the "moxie-plum", or another similarly-named plant, inspired the name of the 1870s patent medicine and later soft drink Moxie.

The leaves can be cooked as a vegetable. The fruits can be eaten raw, baked, or used to make jam.
