= Shawangunk, New York =

Shawangunk
- Town
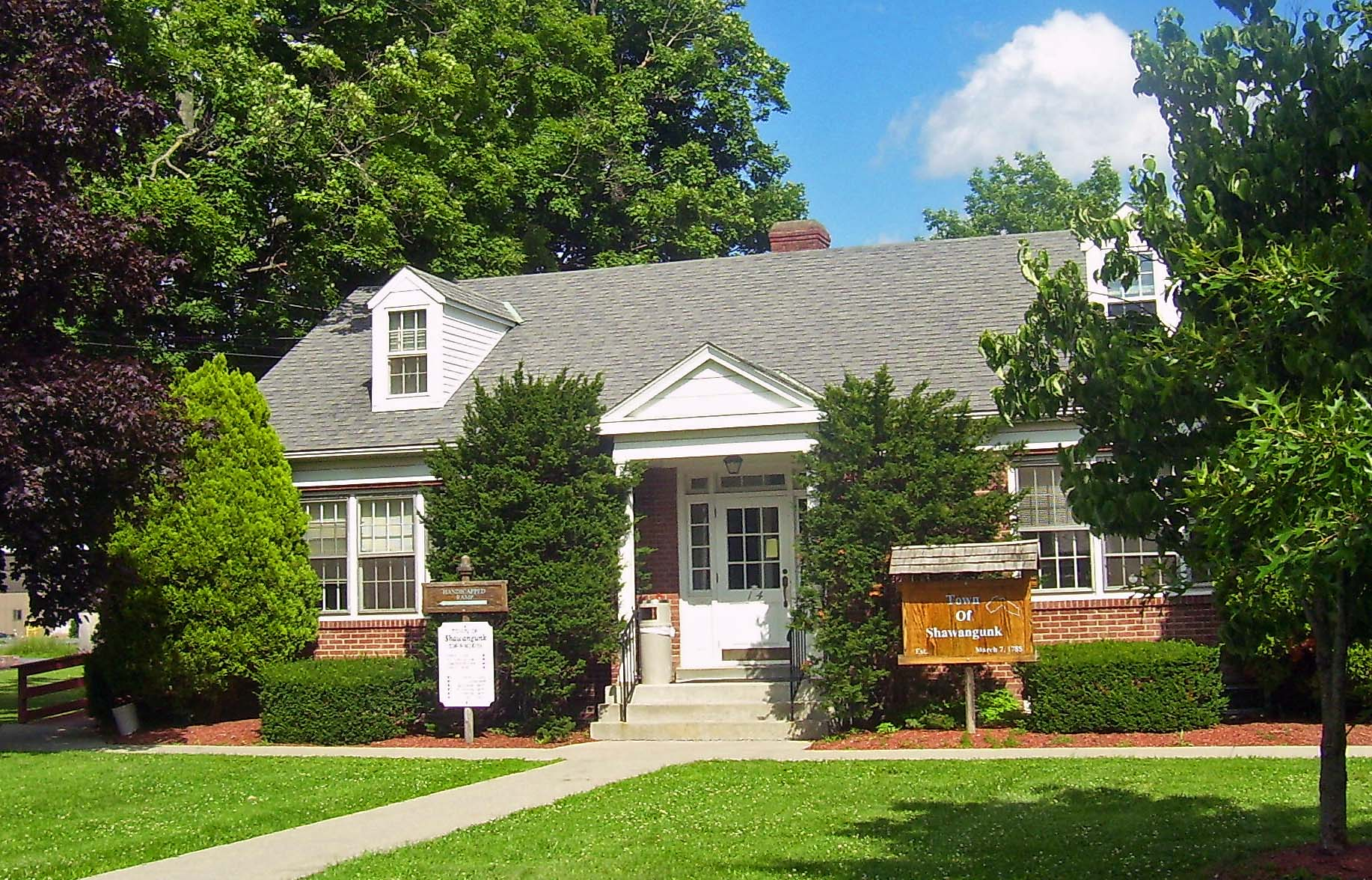
- Town hall in Wallkill

- Location in Ulster County and the state of New York.
- Coordinates: 41°36′59″N 74°13′59″W
- Country: United States
- State: New York
- County: Ulster

Government
  - Supervisor: John Valk Jr.

Area
  - Total: 56.55 sq mi (146.46 km^{2})
  - Land: 56.05 sq mi (145.18 km^{2})
  - Water: 0.49 sq mi (1.28 km^{2})
- Elevation: 335 ft (102 m)

Population (2020)
  - Total: 13,563
  - Density: 241.96/sq mi (93.422/km^{2})
- Time zone: UTC-5 (Eastern (EST))
  - Summer (DST): UTC-4 (EDT)
- FIPS code: 36-66674
- GNIS feature ID: 0979486

Shawangunk is a town in southwestern Ulster County, New York, United States. The population was 13,563 at the 2020 census. The town takes its name from its largest stream, the Shawangunk Kill. The name Shawangunk is from the language of the Lenape people. Kill is an abbreviation of the Dutch word for creek, Killitje. It is pronounced Shuh-Whan-Gung /ˈʃɑːwəŋɡʌŋk/

== History ==
Shawangunk was first settled by Europeans during the 1680s. The region was first designated a precinct about 1710, and became the township of Shawangunk in 1788. The town's name comes from the Dutch transliteration of the Munsee Lenape name or phrase. The approximate Lenape pronunciation was "Sha-WAN-gunk," probably meaning "in the smoky air." The name first appears in the 1682 Indian deed to Gertrude Bruyn. It is uncertain if this was the Indians' actual proper name for their nearby village and "New Fort," destroyed by the Dutch on September 5, 1663, during the Second Esopus War, or if the name was merely a phrase invented by the Indians in connection with the Bruyn land purchase, possibly describing some temporary feature of the landscape. Suggestions as to whether the name may have referred to smoky conditions on the day of Bruyn's first tour of the land with the Indians in the 1670s, or to the smoky ruins of the destroyed Indian village during the preceding decade, are purely speculative. Use of the name to designate the creek on which Bruyn settled (Shawangunk Kill), and the mountain range, came somewhat later. Locals pronounce the name "SHONG-gum," a corruption or contraction of the original name, but one on record at least as far back as 1777 (Marc B. Fried, "Shawangunk Place-names" pp. ix-xi, 3-12, 96-97). Present-day citizens of Shawangunk often refer to themselves as living in particular hamlets such as Wallkill or Walker Valley rather than the town as a whole; this is due to the fact that many residents of the western part of the town are in the school district of Pine Bush (nearby across the county line) and have Pine Bush mailing addresses, also doing much of their shopping in that Orange County hamlet.

== Geography ==
According to the United States Census Bureau, the town has a total area of 56.5 square miles (146 km^{2}), of which 56.2 square miles (146 km^{2}) is land and 0.3 square miles (0.78 km^{2}) (0.55%) is water.

The southern town line and half of the eastern town boundary is the border of Orange County, New York.

The northeastward-flowing Wallkill River passes through the eastern half of town and lends its name to the hamlet, which lies along its east bank. The western part of the town, including Walker Valley, climbs the lower slopes of the eponymous mountains. The Shawangunk Kill, a major tributary of the Wallkill, divides the town approximately in half.

== Government ==
The town of Shawangunk is led by a supervisor and a board of four council members. The current supervisor is John Valk, Jr., in office since 1998.

List of supervisors of Shawangunk:

Name	Years served	Notes
Jacobus Bruyn III	1744–1747	
Cornelius Bruyn	1748–1749	Brother of Jacobus
Benjamin Van Keuren	1750	
Isaac Hasbrouck	1751–1752	Member of Hasbrouck family
Jacobus Sammon	1753	
Johannis Jansen	1754–1760	
Benjamin Van Keuren	1761	
Johannis Jansen	1762	
Benjamin Van Keuren	1763–1764	
Johannis Jansen	1765–1768	
Benjamin Van Keuren	1769	
Johannes Hardenbergh Jr.	1770	
Johannis Jansen	1771–1772	
Johannes Hardenbergh Jr.	1773–1775	
Cornelius C. Schoonmaker	1776–1777	Served as New York State Assemblyman (1777–1790) following term
Thomas Jansen Jr.	1778–1779	Brother of Johannis
James Hunter	1780–1781	
Cornelius C. Schoonmaker	1782–1783	Served as United States Congressman (1791–1793) years after this term
Thomas Jansen Jr.	1784	
James Hunter	1785	
Cornelius Bruyn	1786–1793	Son of Jacobus III; nephew of Cornelius
Justus Banks	1794–1796	
Joseph Isaac Hasbrouck	1797–1799	Son of Isaac, member of Hasbrouck family
James Kain	1800–1803	
Abraham Bruyn	1804–1805	Son of Cornelius; nephew of Jacobus III; first cousin of Cornelius
Stephen Rea	1806	
Albert Roosa	1807	
Stephen Rea	1808–1812	
Joseph Isaac Hasbrouck	1813–1814	
Beverly Kain	1815–1816	Brother of James
Joseph Isaac Hasbrouck	1817	
Abraham J. Hardenbergh	1818–1821	Relative of Johannes Jr.; previously served as New Paltz Town Supervisor
Johannes "John" Jansen	1822–1826	Son of Thomas Jr., nephew of Johannis
George G. Graham	1827–1835	
Hezekiah Watkins	1836–1841	
Cornelius A. Bruyn	1842–1844	Son of Abraham, grandson of Cornelius; great-nephew of Jacobus III; cousin of Cornelius
Eli Van Keuren	1845	
James N. Mitchell	1846	
Samuel Dill	1847	
Eli Van Keuren	1848–1851	
Hector S. Webb	1852–1855	
Matthew Jansen	1856	Son of Johannes, grandson of Thomas Jr., great-nephew of Johannis
Egbert N. Brink	1857–1858	
Edmund Bruyn	1859–1860	Great-grandson of Jacobus III; relative of Abraham, Cornelius, Cornelius, and Cornelius A. Bruyn
Cornelius Abram Jansen Hardenbergh	1861–1867	Great-nephew of Abraham J. Hardenbergh; relative of Johannes Hardenberg Jr.; cousin of Johannis, Thomas Jr., Johannes and Matthew Jansen
Eli Van Keuren	1868–1869	
Abram N. Deyoe	1870–1872	
Thomas Fulton	1873	
Samuel Dill Jr.	1874–1875	Son of Samuel
Cornelius Abram Jansen Hardenbergh	1876–1882	Served as New York State Assemblyman shortly after this term (1885 to 1886)
Elias Mulford	1883–1884	
Walstein Childs	1885–1892	
Benjamin F. Dickinson	1893–1895	
D. Barclay DuBois	1896–1897	
Benjamin F. Dickinson	1898–1901	
George J. Alsdorf	1902–1907	
William W. McElhone	1908–1917	
Robert H. Terwilliger	1918–1919	
Frank J. Wilkin	1920–1921	
Joseph F. Scott	1922–1927	
George E. Halliday	1928–1929	Died in office
Lester C. Terwilliger	1935	Relative of Robert
Edward E. Murray	1936–1946	
Jesse McHugh	1951–1965	
Charles E. Penney	1965–1969	C.E. Penney Drive in Wallkill named for him
M.J. Oscar Smith	1969–1972	
Francis V. Garrison	1972–1975	
Charles Flynn	1979	
John Scott	1987–1988	
John Valk Jr.	1998–present	Re-elected in 2021

== Demographics ==
Historical population
Census	Pop.	Note	%±
1790	2,128		—
1820	3,372		—
1830	3,681		9.2%
1840	3,886		5.6%
1850	4,036		3.9%
1860	2,870		−28.9%
1870	2,823		−1.6%
1880	2,910		3.1%
1890	2,456		−15.6%
1900	2,406		−2.0%
1910	2,548		5.9%
1920	2,087		−18.1%
1930	2,127		1.9%
1940	3,117		46.5%
1950	3,561		14.2%
1960	4,604		29.3%
1970	5,749		24.9%
1980	8,186		42.4%
1990	10,081		23.1%
2000	12,022		19.3%
2010	14,332		19.2%
2020	13,563		−5.4%
U.S. Decennial Census

As of 2009, there were 12,652 people, 4,333 households, and 2,557 families residing in the town. The population density was 225 people per square mile . There were 3,754 housing units at an average density of 66.8 per square mile (25.8/km^{2}). The racial makeup of the town was 83% White, 7.9% African American, .2% Native American, .9% Asian, .01% Pacific Islander, 2.86% from other races, and 1.32% from two or more races. Hispanic or Latino of any race were 6.96% of the population.

There were 3,433 households, out of which 39.2% had children under the age of 18 living with them, 61.5% were married couples living together, 8.4% had a female householder with no husband present, and 25.5% were non-families. 20.2% of all households were made up of individuals, and 7% had someone living alone who was 65 years of age or older. The average household size was 2.78 and the average family size was 3.21.

In the town, the population was spread out, with 22.4% under the age of 18, 8.5% from 18 to 24, 38.3% from 25 to 44, 22.2% from 45 to 64, and 8.7% who were 65 years of age or older. The median age was 36 years. For every 100 females, there were 134.3 males. For every 100 females age 18 and over, there were 144.3 males.

The median income for a household in the town was $52,366, and the median income for a family was $59,975. Males had a median income of $40,967 versus $29,608 for females. The per capita income for the town was $19,402. About 4.4% of families and 13.4% of the population were below the poverty line, including 7.0% of those under age 18 and 10.5% of those age 65 or over.

=== Housing ===
Statistics about housing in the town:

- Total: 4,333
- Occupied: 3,877
- Owner-occupied: 3,092
- Population in owner-occupied: 8,890
- Renter-occupied: 795
- Population in renter-occupied: 1,917
- Households with individuals under 18: 1,465
- Vacant: 446
- Vacant for rent: 87
- Vacant for sale: 66

== Geology ==
The Shawangunk Mountains, primarily consisting of quartz, rise 2,000 feet above the town. The mountains were created over 10,000 years ago during the last ice age when retreating glacial ice carved them out as part the surrounding Catskills, drawing tourists and climbing enthusiasts from all over the world.

== Communities and locations in Shawangunk ==
- Awosting – A hamlet in the northwestern part of the town.
- Bruynswick – A hamlet near the northern town line on County Route 7.
- Crawford – A hamlet in the northwestern section of the town, south of Awosting.
- Dwaarkill (archaic: Dwaar Kill) – A hamlet north of Red Mills, located on County Route 7.
- Galeville – A former hamlet in the eastern part of the town, north of Wallkill. Galeville is on the west bank of the Wallkill River. Once home to Galeville Army Air Base, now Shawangunk Grasslands National Wildlife Refuge.
- New Hurley – A former hamlet on Route 208.
- Red Mills – A hamlet at the southern town line and north of Pine Bush.
- Rutsonville
- Shawangunk Kill – A small stream in the town.
- Ulstervillle – Area west of Pine Bush, located on County Road 7.
- Watchtower – A census-designated-place (CDP) that is entirely made up of the residents of Watchtower Farms, a printing facility that draws tens of thousands of visitors every year. It is owned and operated by the Watchtower Society (a legal entity of Jehovah's Witnesses) and has been in operation since 1963.
- Walker Valley – a hamlet in the southwest part of the town on Route 52. Walker Valley is west of Pine Bush.
- Wallkill – a hamlet at the eastern town line.
- Shawangunk Correctional Facility – a New York state prison, north of Wallkill.
- Wallkill Correctional Facility – a state prison north of Wallkill.

The official New York State Gazetteer, which is maintained and published by the New York State Department of Health, includes numerous defunct hamlets and towns in the state, some with alternate or archaic spellings. The Gazetteer lists several now-defunct hamlets that were located within Shawangunk: Mount Valley, New Prospect Ch. [sic] (likely meant as an abbreviation for New Prospect Church), St. Elmo (and, separately, St. Elmo Station), and The Cape.
