= Trapps Mountain Hamlet Historic District =

Historic district in New York, United States

- U.S. National Register of Historic Places
- U.S. Historic district
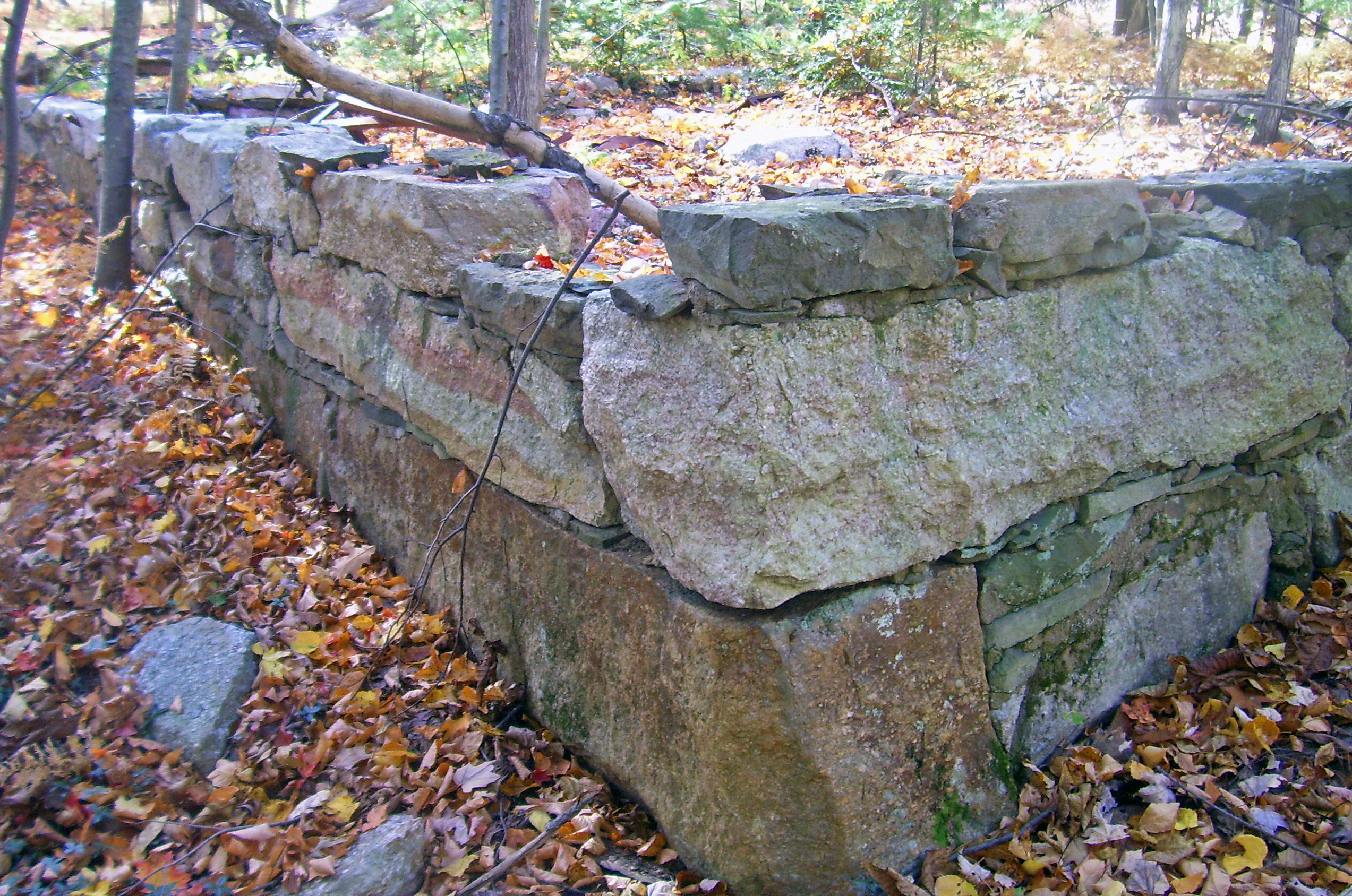
- Cellar hole of Davis House site, 2008

- Location within New York Location within the United States
- Location: Gardiner, NY
- Nearest city: Poughkeepsie
- Coordinates: 41°44′0″N 74°12′51″W
- Area: 433 acres (175 ha)
- Built: 1790–1940s
- NRHP reference No.: 00001275
- Added to NRHP: November 2, 2000

The Trapps Mountain Hamlet Historic District is located on the Shawangunk Ridge in Gardiner, New York, United States. It is a large area that covers the site of a settlement that thrived there from the late 18th to mid-20th centuries. Inhabitants practiced subsistence farming, making it one of the rare such communities in the East to have left any trace remaining. They supplemented that with a variety of other trades, primarily in the forest products industry, with most inhabitants gradually coming to work at nearby mountain resorts in the 20th century. The last resident died in 1956.

Only foundations remain for most of the buildings, and only six remain standing. Those that do show a unique structural system that suggests an influence of the Native American tribes that lived in the area at the time it was settled. Today most of them are on protected lands in the area, with a few privately owned. In 2000 the area was designated a historic district and listed on the National Register of Historic Places.

== Geography ==
The Trapps historic district contains about 433 acres centered along the US 44/NY 55 highway and the Coxing Kill atop the Shawangunk in the northwestern portion of Gardiner, with some portions overlapping into neighboring Rochester. Most of that area is now reforested, part of the Mohonk Preserve or Minnewaska State Park Preserve, or privately owned. A network of hiking trails and unpaved carriage roads can be accessed from the two nature preserves.

The nearest large villages to the Trapps were New Paltz to the east and High Falls to the northeast. The mountainous topography of the area has been sculpted in large part by glacial action and stream erosion by the Coxing Kill and Peters Kill, which provided water and water power for the Trapps people. Over time, however, these two natural forces resulted in shallow, rocky soil, which helped to limit the hamlet's population.

The district's highest elevation is roughly 1,100 feet above sea level, falling to about 700 feet at its lowest point. Directly east are the Trapps and Near Trapps climbing cliffs, which face New Paltz and are managed by the Mohonk Preserve. The gap or notch between these cliff escarpments has provided access for traffics over the centuries, including the modern-day U.S. Route 44/55.

== History ==
During the colonial era, much of the northern Shawangunks were first partitioned into two land patents, the Groote Transport ("Great Transaction") Patent of 1730, and the Nineteen Partners Tract of 1770. These land patents covered most of the eastern portion of the colonial Town of Rochester and opened the way for settlement of the Trapps after the Revolutionary War. Early settlers moving up from the surrounding valleys were primarily of Dutch descent, with one or two families of English descent.

A will of the 1780s refers to a sawmill site later associated with the Enderly family. For about a century, Enderly families operated their farm, sawmill, and blacksmith forge on the Coxing Kill at the intersection of a centuries-old path and an unpaved colonial road. The Trapps hamlet itself grew along the Coxing Kill in the upper Clove, a Dutch word meaning cleft or valley.

Trapps families built homes of log, plank, and frame. A plank house is unique as a type of American vernacular architecture. It consists of vertical planks, or rough-cut thick boards, which were nailed together to form walls, raised in place, and connected at the corners with simple lap joints. There are no corner posts or studs. Planks and hand-hewn beams provided the basic structure or skeleton of the house. Due to the hamlet's isolation, a cultural lag existed there, with the Trapps people continuing to build log and plank houses through the 1800s.

Thin, rocky soil prevented the establishment of large farms in the Trapps. Families grew a few acres of corn, buckwheat, rye, oats, or potatoes; they kept a horse, cow or two, a handful of chickens, perhaps a few pigs. They supplemented their subsistence farm crops by selling butter, fruit, and eggs. Trapps men also shaved barrel hoops; peeled hemlock and oak bark for nearby leather tanneries; carved millstones from conglomerate rock; and burned charcoal. The Van Leuvens were a Trapps family widely known for burning Shawangunk charcoal.

Huckleberry picking was a major cash crop for the Trapps people from the 1800s to the mid-1900s. Families, from toddlers to grandparents, entered the berry woods from July to September, filling pails and buckets by the thousands. Pickers frequently set the woods on fire to create conditions more favorable to the berry's growth. At least one Trapps family spent summers in the vicinity of Sam's Point above Ellenville, where seasonal berry camps became popular after 1900.

By the 1840s, the Trapps hamlet was large enough to support its own one-room school, with one established in 1850. Seven years later, the New Paltz and Wawarsing Turnpike was built through the Trapps; present-day U.S. Route 44/55 follows much of the old turnpike route. Turnpike investors hoped to open up markets for products from the Catskills, but within a few years the turnpike went bankrupt. Still, it allowed increased traffic through the Trapps, and the hamlet grew to include a hotel, boarding houses, a store and a chapel. In 1887, Philip H. Smith noted these features in his book, "Legends of the Shawangunks." The 1880s and 1890s were the peak years of the hamlet when about 40 to 50 families lived in the Trapps.

In 1859, John F. Stokes established the first mountain inn and tavern at Mohonk Lake. In 1869, Quaker Twins Albert and Alfred Smiley acquired the property, expanded the inn into a mountain house-styled hotel, and began buying available land to provide a natural retreat for their guests. In 1879, Alfred left Mohonk to open his first of two mountain houses at Minnewaska Lake to the south.

These mountain hotels provided steadier employment for the Trapps people, even as many sold their land to the Smiley families at either lake. Skilled men were also needed to build the mountain houses, as well as a network of trails and unpaved carriage roads for guest use. The Trapps, the Clove, and neighboring sister hamlets provided that skilled labor.

The hamlet declined after 1900 as technological advances replaced mountain industries. Wooden hoops for securing barrel staves gave way to steel hoops; millstones bowed out to steel. About 1907, the Town of Gardiner abandoned part of Van Leuven Road, a main north-south route in the Trapps; the town could no longer afford its maintenance. Pandemics, such as the Spanish Flu of 1918, also reduced the population.

The construction of U.S. Route 44/55 in the late 1920s helped accelerate the decline of the Trapps. The new, paved highway bypassed the hamlet center and cut some properties in two. Many of the remaining residents sold out completely and moved to nearby villages, such as Ellenville, Walden, and New Paltz, where they found work and a better way of life.

Irving Van Leuven was the last Trapps resident to live the old ways. Born and raised in the Trapps, Irv lived in a house without electricity or running water until his death in 1956. Irv was the last in the Trapps to burn charcoal and shave barrel hoops, skills he had learned from his father and grandfather.

Another Van Leuven home, bought in the 1920s by Mohonk Mountain House, became part of the Mohonk Preserve later in the century. During the 1960s and for several decades after, members of the Appalachian Mountain Club leased this house, affectionately known as the Appy Cabin, as a base for rock climbing on the nearby cliffs. Recognizing the building's value, the Mohonk Preserve restored the cabin, renamed it in honor of its last resident Eli Van Leuven, and opened it as a historic structure.

The Mohonk Preserve also secured designation for the Trapps mountain hamlet as a historic district on the New York State and National Registers for Historic Places. In addition, Preserve staff has identified about 65 cultural and historic sites within the district, including cellar holes (stone foundations) of former buildings, water-powered sawmills, bridge abutments, stone walls, stone quarries, charcoal pits, and burying grounds (cemeteries).

The Smiley hotels at Minnewaska were bought by the Phillips family in 1955 but were closed down in the 1970s. Both hotels burned down, and a proposal by the Marriott Corporation to redevelop the area as a private resort and condominiums led to widespread opposition. As a result, New York State arranged for the Palisades Interstate Park Commission to buy the property and manage it as Minnewaska State Park Preserve, putting that section of the Trapps mountain hamlet into public ownership.

== Visiting the Trapps Mountain Hamlet ==
Eli Van Leuven Cabin. Built about 1889 in the plank house style, this is the only remaining building of the former Trapps hamlet on Mohonk Preserve land. The Preserve restored the cabin and opens it periodically for guided tours, which are announced on the Preserve's website.

The Trapps Mountain Hamlet Path leading to the Eli Van Leuven Cabin. Following the old Van Leuven Road, this path is accessed from the Mohonk Preserve's West Trapps Trailhead on U.S. Route 44/55. A guide to the path is available at the trailhead kiosk or from the Preserve's Visitor Center on U.S. Route 44/55. Along the path, visitors can discover the following:

- An abandoned millstone quarry, where Trapps stonecutters once blasted out stone slabs to carve and finish into millstones.

- An old bridge abutment, where a bridge once allowed people, horses, and wagons to cross the brook.

- An old stone fence or wall, which served as a boundary or field marker. Ben Fowler of the Trapps owned this property of about 150 acres, keeping about a third as pasture and meadow, and a few acres in rye, oats, and buckwheat for family use.

- Fowler burying ground, where Ben Fowler and other members of his family are buried, including several of his young grandchildren. The earliest headstone dates to 1866. At the end of the path beyond the burying ground is the Eli Van Leuven Cabin.

Visitors can also see remains of the former Enderly sawmill and farm, including the Enderly family burying ground, by driving west along U.S. Route 44/55 a short distance past the West Trapps Trailhead, and turning right onto Clove Road to the Preserve's Coxing Trailhead.

== See also ==
- National Register of Historic Places listings in Ulster County, New York
