= 1975 People's National Convention =

- 1976 presidential election
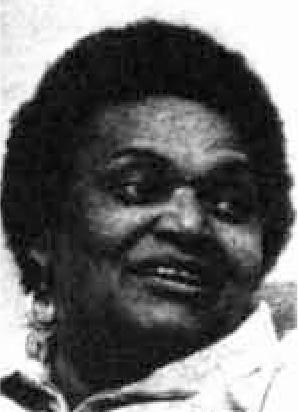
- Convention nominees (Wright and Kuhn)

Convention
- Dates: August 25–September 1, 1975
- City: St. Louis, Missouri
- Venue: J.C. Penny Co. Warehouse Building at the University of Missouri–St. Louis

Candidates
- Presidential nominee: Margaret Wright
- Vice-presidential nominee: Maggie Kuhn declined

The 1975 People's National Convention was held August 25–September 1, 1975, at the in St. Louis, Missouri. The party nominated Margaret Wright for president and Maggie Kuhn for vice president in the 1976 United States presidential election. Kuhn ultimately declined the vice presidential nomination, and the party later replaced her with Benjamin Spock as its vice presidential nominee.

== Background ==
The People's Party had been founded in 1971 as a coalition of several autonomous national, state and local parties. At its organizational meeting (held July 1971 in Albuquerque, New Mexico), it was described by its national campaign director, Jim McClellan, as, "a loose coalition of autonomous, radical, non-secretariat parties". The party's electoral goal was to provide a radical alternative to the United States' two major parties (the Democratic and Republican) parties). The People's Party was ideologically radical, socialist, and left-wing. The key member parties of the People's Party included the then-national Peace and Freedom Party, the local (Ann Arbor-based) Human Rights Party, and the Vermont state Liberty Union Party (today known as the "Green Mountain Peace and Justice Party").

In the 1972 United States presidential election, the party had nominated Benjamin Spock (author and activist) for president, nominee, and Julius Hobson (activist) for vice president. The party saw marginal success as a third party in 1972. The party had only able to gain full ballot access for in ten, rendering Spock a mere write-in candidate in most states, a lack of ballot access which proved a barrier to his performance in that election.

== Logistics ==
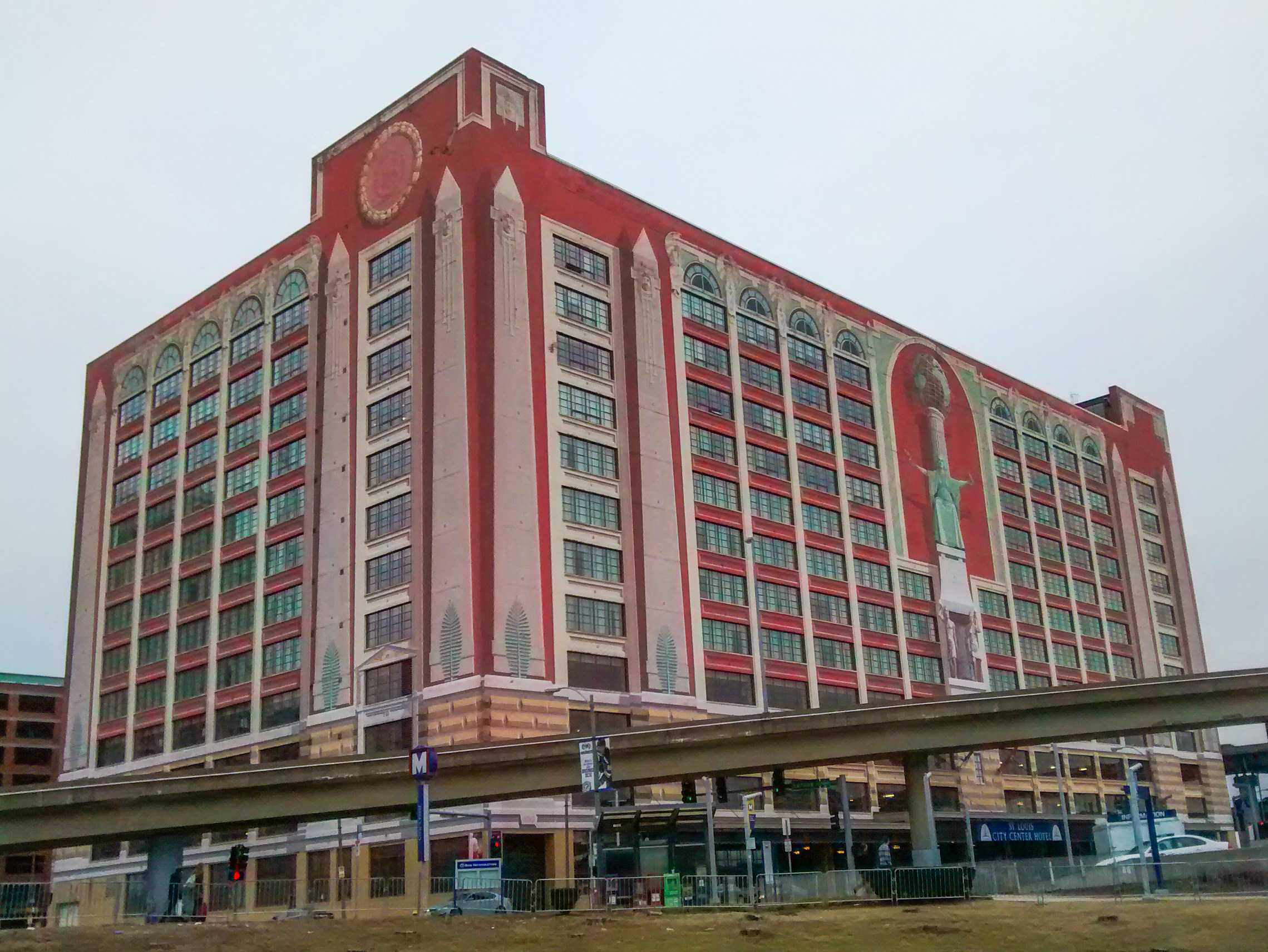
J.C. Penny Co. Warehouse Building, venue of the convention

The convention was held at the J.C. Penny Co. Warehouse Building at the University of Missouri–St. Louis (UMSL) in St. Louis, Missouri. The logistics of the event were headed by Dan Brodgan, a student who was part of the University Year for Action (UYA) program at UMSL.

== Presidential and vice presidential nominations ==
The convention nominated Margaret Wright for president and Maggie Kuhn for vice president. This ticket was notable for featuring two female nominees. After Kuhn declined the vice presidential nomination, she was later replaced by the party with Benjamin Spock as its vice presidential nominee.

== Aftermath ==
The Wright–Spock ticket in the presidential election received even less media attention than the party's ticket had in the previous election. The ticket received 49,013 votes nationally, 0.06% of all votes counted.

The party would dissolve before the next presidential election. It held its last party convention in New York City November 25–27, 1977, where discussions were held about dissolving the party and the possibility of its member organizations merging into Socialist Party USA.
