= 2016 Reform National Convention =

- 2016 presidential election
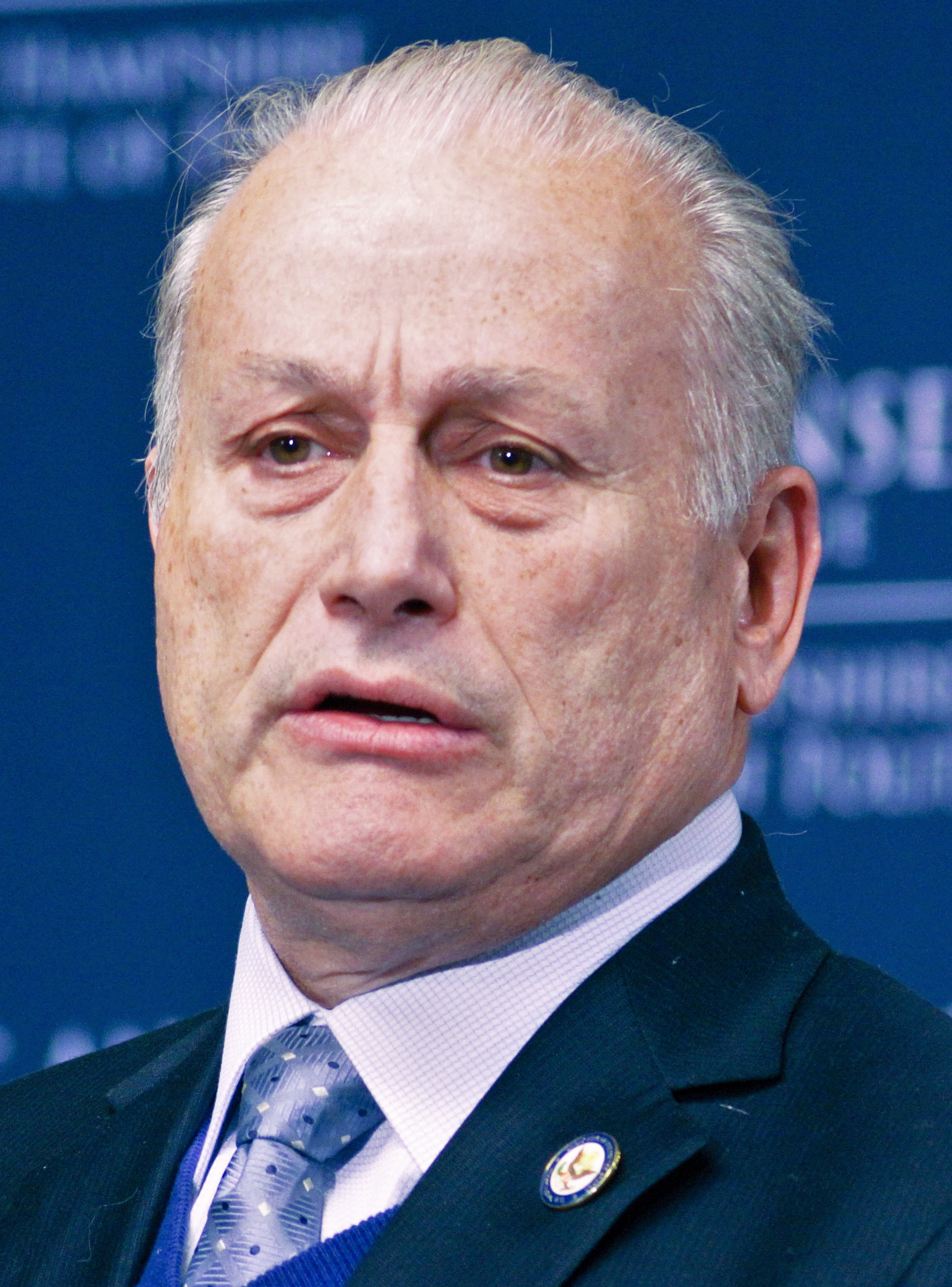
- Presidential nominee (De La Fuente)

Convention
- Date(s): July 29–31, 2016
- City: Bohemia, New York

Candidates
- Presidential nominee: Rocky De La Fuente of California

The Reform Party of the United States of America held a United States presidential nominating convention to select its presidential nominee for the 2016 United States presidential election. The convention was held in Bohemia, New York, July 29–31, 2016. Out of 5 contestants, Rocky De La Fuente emerged as the party nominee.

== Candidates ==
=== Other Candidates ===
Name	Notes
Ed Chlapowski	Owner/manager at Opportunity Resolution
Kenneth Cross	Semi-retired engineer and businessman Reform Party vice-presidential nominee, 2012
Lynn Kahn	Doctor of clinical psychology Sought 2016 Peace and Freedom Party presidential nomination. Will appear on Arkansas and Iowa ballot.
Darcy Richardson	Historian and writer 2012 Democratic Party presidential hopeful.Bald eagle. received 41,730 in the primary
