= 1968 Peace and Freedom National Convention =

- 1968 presidential election
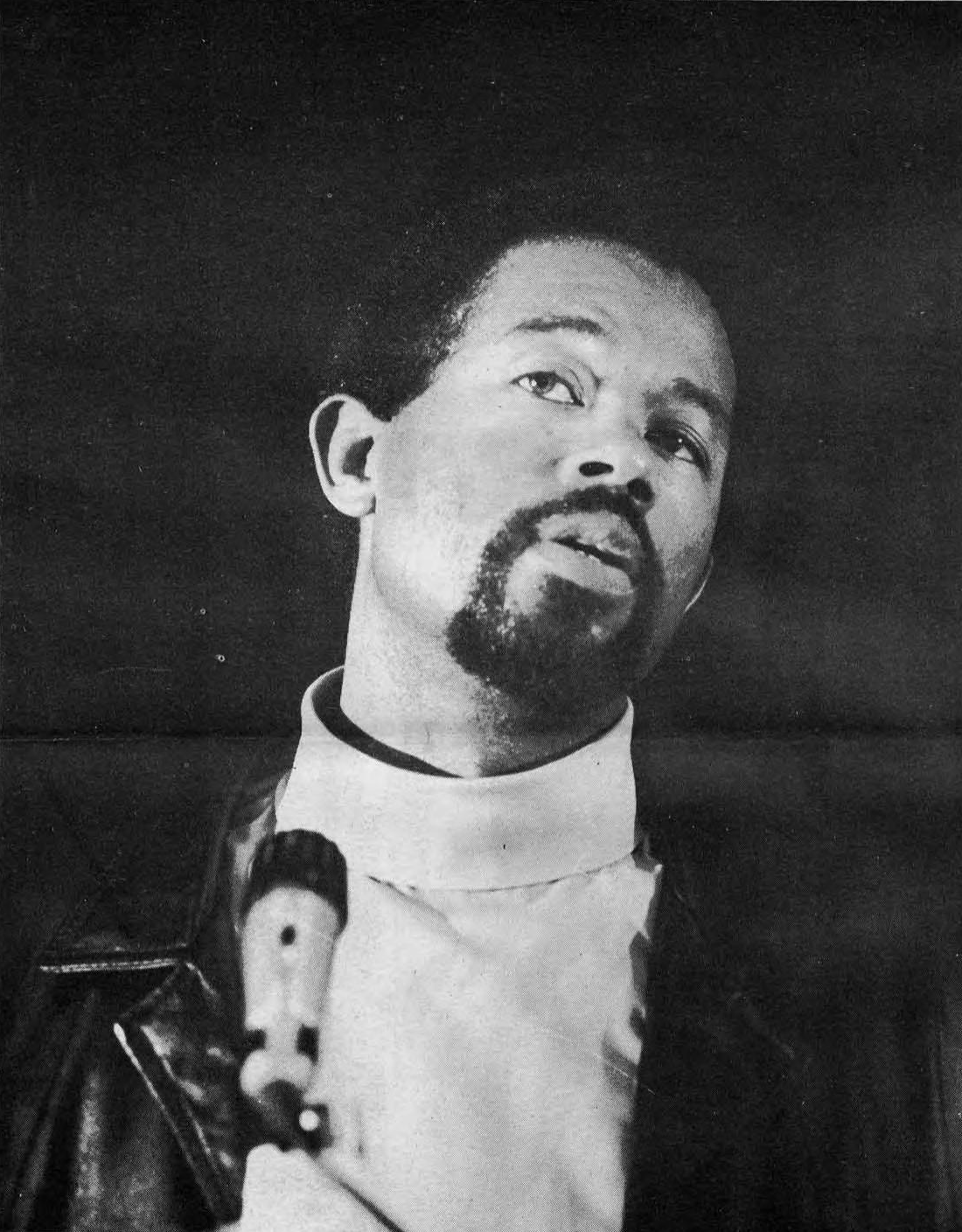
- Presidential nominee (Cleaver)

Convention
- Date(s): August 17–18, 1968
- City: Ann Arbor, Michigan

Candidates
- Presidential nominee: Eldridge Cleaver of California
- Vice-presidential nominee: no national nominee

Voting
- Total delegates: 219
- Results (president): Eldridge Cleaver: 161.5; Dick Gregory: 54
- Ballots: 1

1968 Peace and Freedom National Convention was held August 17-18 in Ann Arbor, Michigan. The convention nominated Eldridge Cleaver to be the party's presidential nominee, while leaving the vice presidential nomination up to each state party's independent determination (allowing state parties to nominate their own choices to appear for vice president on their state's ballots).

== Background ==
The event was the first presidential nominating convention of the newly-founded Peace and Freedom Party. The party was strongly aligned with the opposition to United States involvement in the Vietnam War. Its opposition to the war was a key aspect of the party's identity. The party also aligned itself with more militant-leaning factions of the Black Power movement.

== Logistics ==
=== Venue ===
The convention was held August 17–18, 1968, in Ann Arbor, Michigan. The convention was organized by the local group, Ann Arbor Citizens for New Politics.

=== Delegate selection ===
219 delegates from 20 states attended the convention.

On August 4, 1968, the California state party held state conventions at two locations to select its delegation. One convention being held in Los Angeles and another in San Francisco at the South San Francisco Opera House. More than 400 attended the San Francisco event. Both Eldridge Cleaver and Dick Gregory (each running for the nomination) spoke before both conventions, in hopes of having delegates backing their candidacy elected to the convention. California was allocate a total of 71 delegates to the national convention. At the state conventions, 44 delegates supporting Cleaver were elected, 22 supporting Gregory were elected, 3 supporting Eugene McCarthy were elected, and two uncommitted delegates were elected. This allocation was the outcome of preference voting for presidential candidates cast at the convention. (Note: result of the California convention preference voting was as follows: Cleaver 1,281 votes; Gregory 660 votes; McCarthy 80 votes; uncommitted 70 votes; 15 votes deemed "invalid")

Hawaii's state party selected its delegates on August 11, the closing night of its state convention. The California Adult Authority (the California state criminal parole board) refused to grant Cleaver permission to leave California to speak at the Hawaii convention, so his wife, Kathleen Cleaver, spoke in his stead.

== Presidential nomination ==
The convention nominated Cleaver to be the party's presidential nominee. Cleaver was regarded to be the more "militant" of contenders, between him and Gregory. Cleaver would be below the age of eligibility to serve as president if elected, which ultimately led California Secretary of State Frank M. Jordan to refuse to place him on that state's ballot, with the party being left with only a vice presidential nominee on California's ballot as a result. Similarly, the party had only a vice presidential nominee on the Utah, and New York as well. The party was altogether excluded from the Hawaii ballot due to this.

After losing out on the Peace and Freedom Party's nomination, Gregory created an offshoot "Peace Party" in which he ran for president, with Mark Lane as his vice presidential running mate. Gregory's splinter candidacy was largely as a write-in candidate on ballots.

Cleaver was also backed by the Black Panther Party, and the Peace and Freedom convention supported the ten-point plan of the Black Panther Party.

Presidential balloting
Candidate	Votes	%
Eldridge Cleaver	161.5	73.74
Dick Gregory	54	24.66
Eugene McCarthy	3	1.37
Benjamin Spock/Coretta Scott King (Note: half a vote was given in support of nominating a ticket with Spock and King for president and vice president)	0.5	0.23
Totals	219	100

== Vice presidential nomination deliberations ==
90 minutes of caucusing and an hour's debate was held at the convention, with Cleaver unsuccessfully seeking to have Youth International Party ("Yippies") leader Jerry Rubin nominated as his vice presidential running mate.

The convention ultimately decided to leave vice presidential selection up to each state party's independent determination, allowing state parties to nominate different choices to be nominated for vice president on their state's ballots. The motion that was adopted for this was led by the convention's host group, the Ann Arbor Citizens for New Politics. The Michigan party quickly selected Larry Hochman (an associate professor of physics at Eastern Michigan University) as vice presidential nominee on its state state ballot. In California, the state party nominated Peggy Terry for vice president. In Utah, the state party nominated Corky Gonzales for vice president. In New York, the state party nominated Douglas Fitzgerald Dowd for vice president.
