= Minnewaska State Park Preserve =

State park in New York, United States

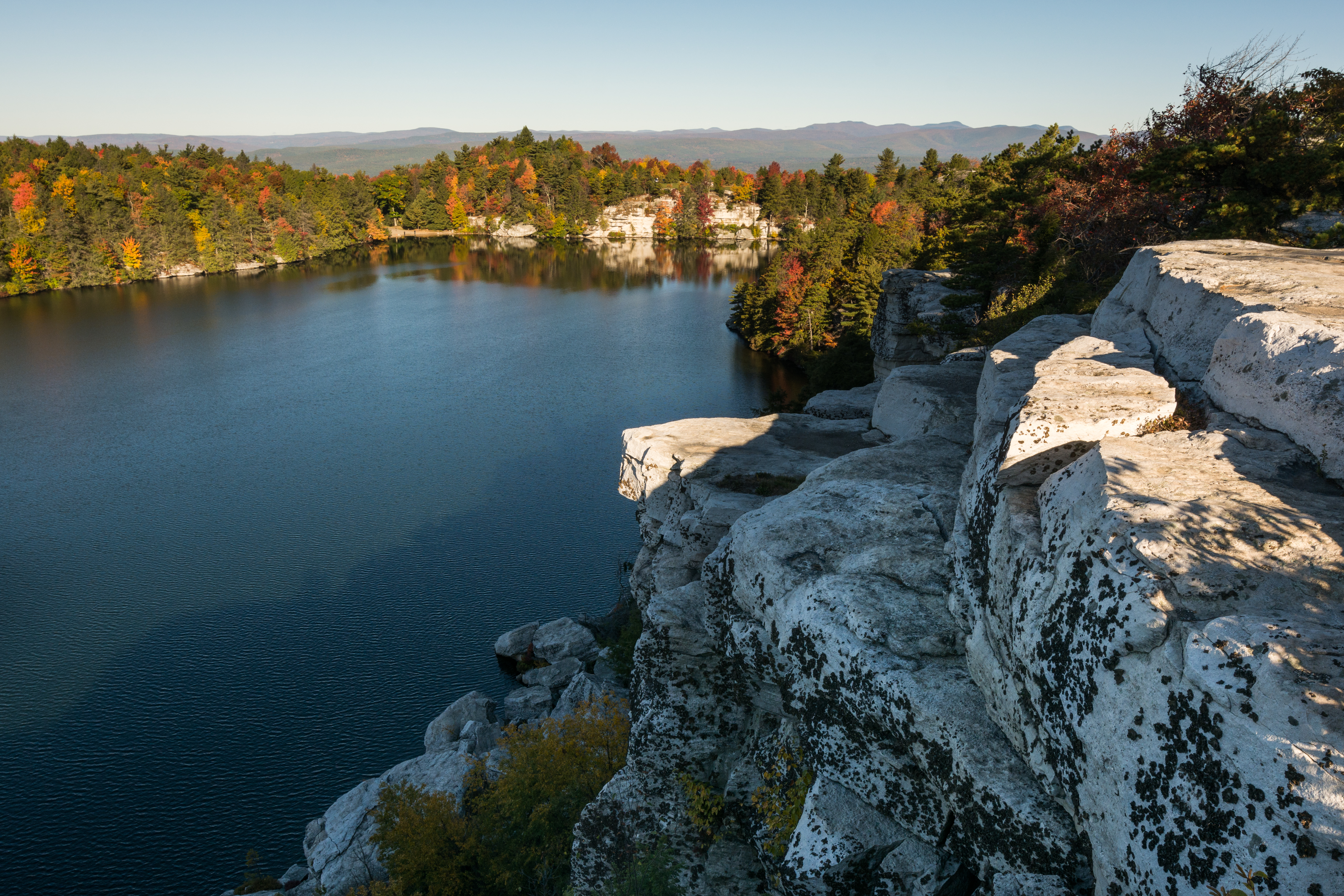
- Lake Minnewaska from the cliffs on the eastern shore

- Location within New York
- Type: State Park Preserve
- Location: New York State, United States
- Nearest city: Kerhonkson, New York
- Coordinates: 41.735149°N 74.239037°W
- Area: 23,974 acres (9,702 ha)
- Elevation: 2,000 feet (610 m)
- Opened: 1993
- Operator: New York State Office of Parks, Recreation and Historic Preservation; Palisades Interstate Park Commission
- Water: Lake Awosting; Lake Minnewaska; Lake Maratanza; Mud Pond
- Website: parks.ny.gov/parks/127

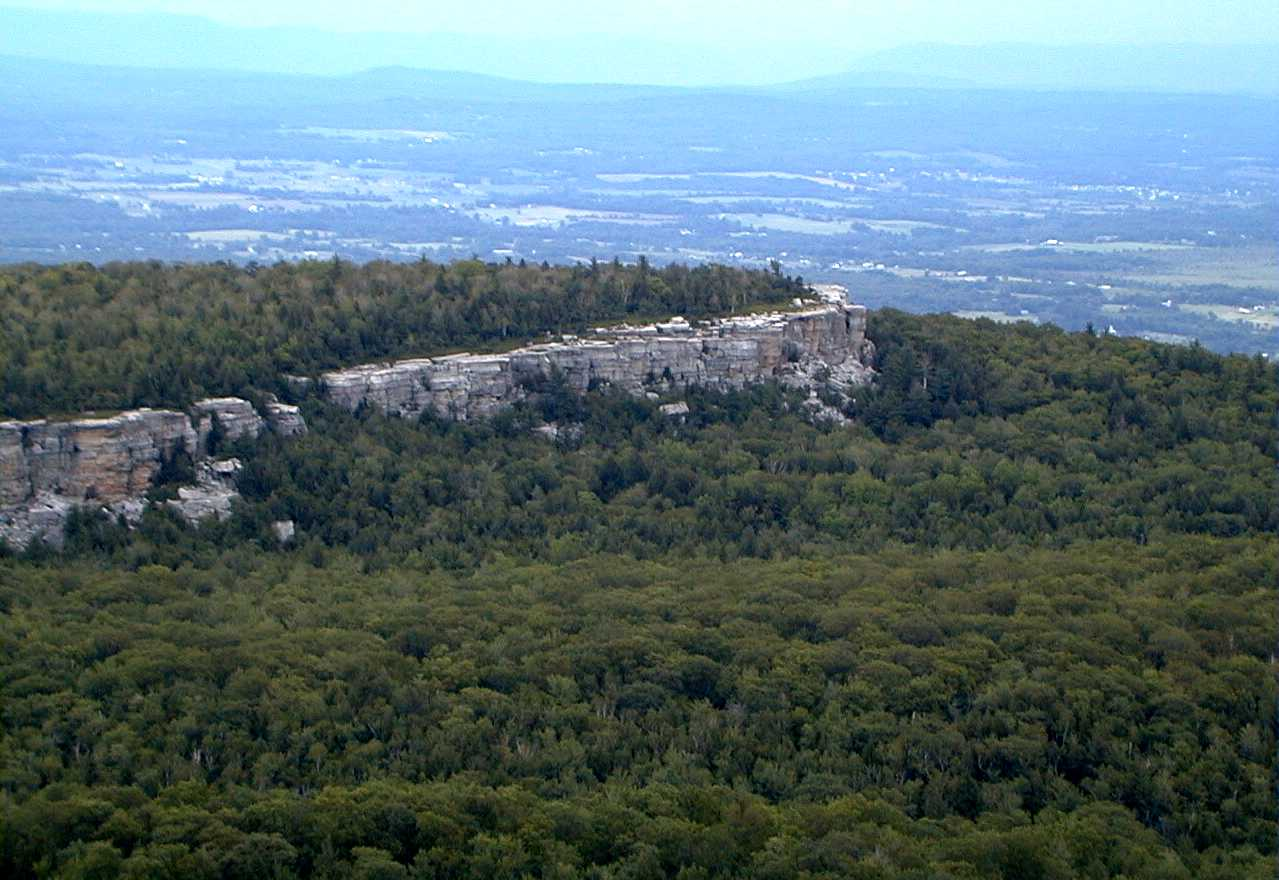
Gertrude's nose from Hamilton Point

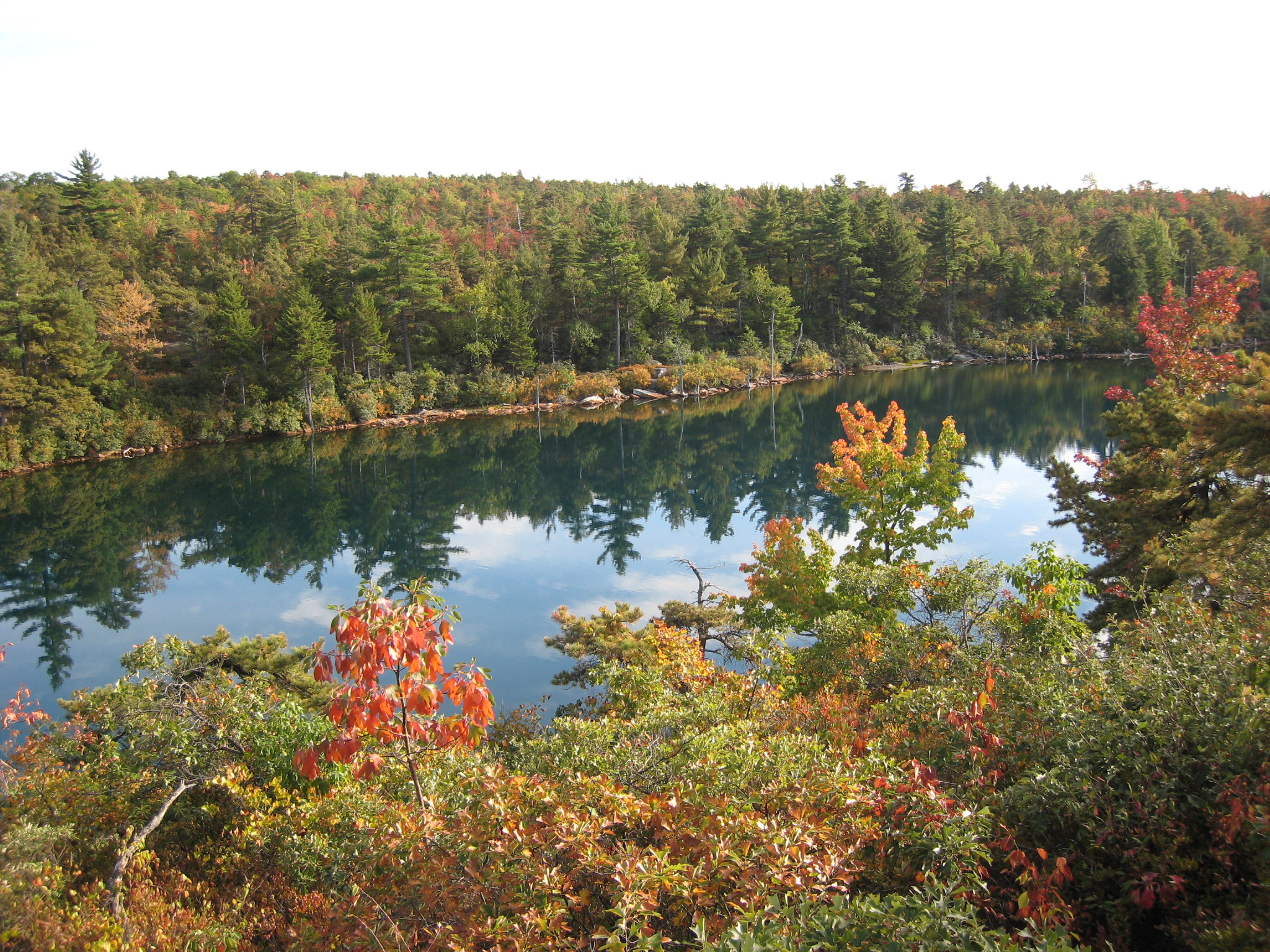
Lake Awosting in fall

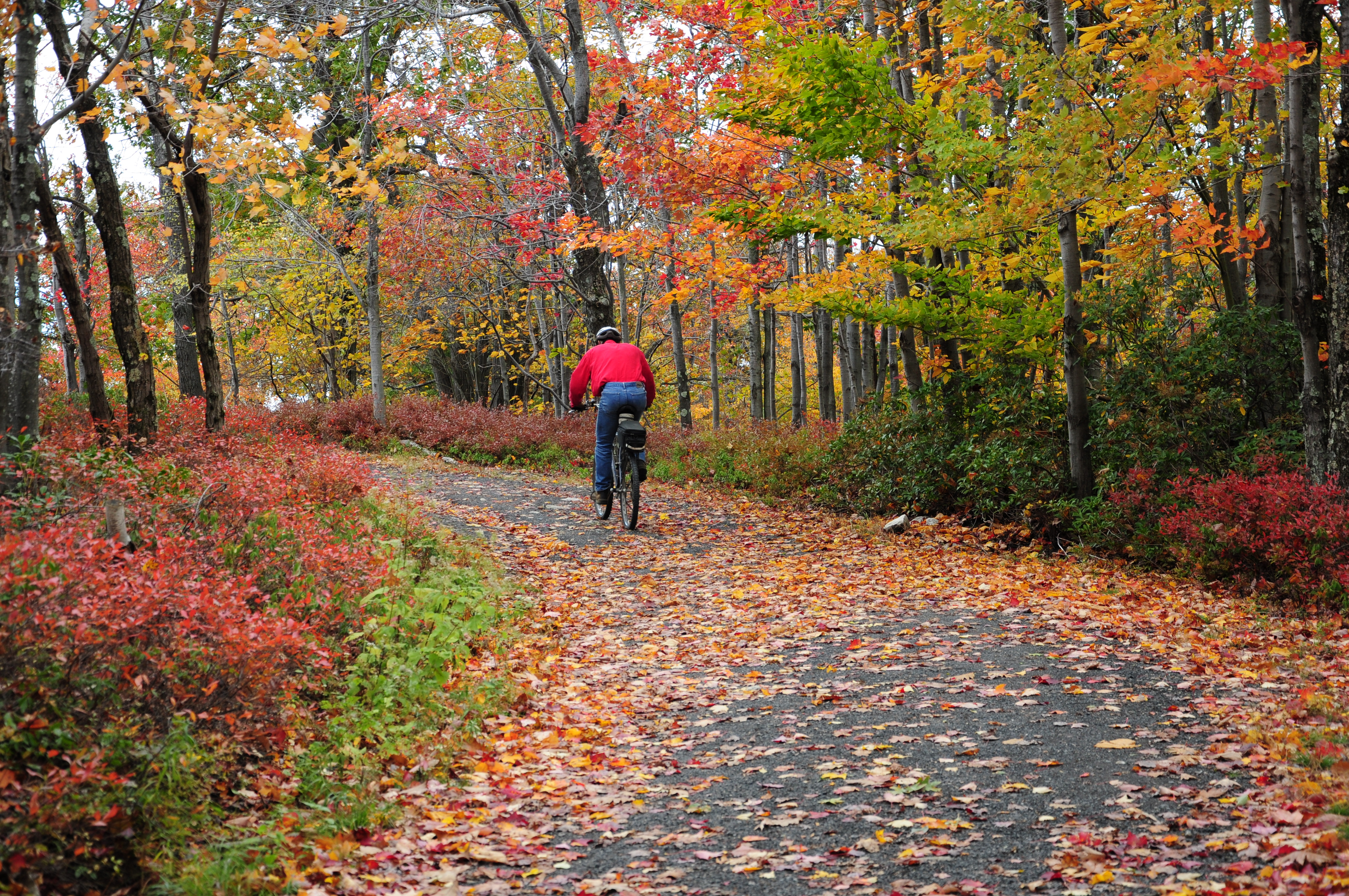
Castle Point Trail in Minnewasaka State Park

The Minnewaska State Park Preserve is a 23,974-acre (97.02 km^{2}) preserve located on the Shawangunk Ridge in Ulster County, New York on US 44/NY 55, five miles (8.0 km) west of New York State Route 299. The park, which features scenic overlooks of the nearby Catskill Mountains, is primarily used for picnicking, hiking, mountain biking, snowshoeing and swimming. The park is managed by the Palisades Interstate Park Commission and the New York State Office of Parks, Recreation and Historic Preservation.

Four of the five sky lakes on the Shawangunk Ridge lie within the preserve: Lake Minnewaska, Lake Awosting, Mud Pond (also known as Lake Haseco), and Lake Maratanza; Mohonk Lake is on the property of the Mohonk Mountain House to the north of Minnewaska. Lake Minnewaska is a bit less than one-half mile (0.8 km) long by one-eighth mile (0.2 km) wide at its widest point. Lake Awosting is roughly three times as large, with a length of about one and an eighth miles (1.8 km) and a maximum width of about one-quarter mile (0.4 km) mile.

== History ==
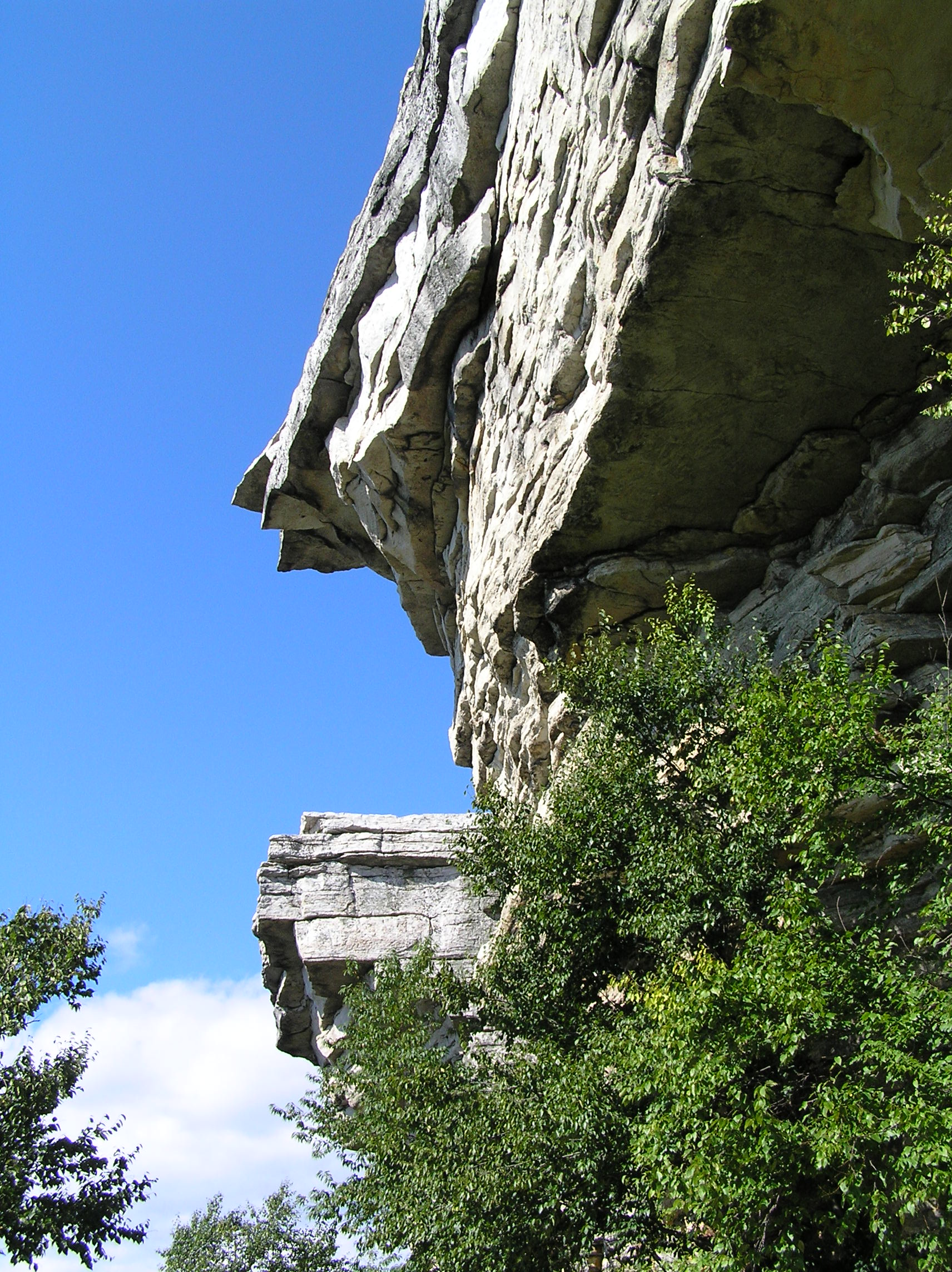
Battlement Terrace in Minnewaska State Park

Originally part of Albert and Alfred Smiley's Mohonk Mountain House property, the Minnewaska Mountain House, or Cliff House, was built in 1879 overlooking Lake Minnewaska; it could accommodate 225 guests. After managing and developing Mohonk's early growth for ten years, twin Alfred H. Smiley purchased and developed Minnewaska separate from Mohonk, but the brothers exchanged courtesies to each other's guests. A second hotel, Wildmere, accommodated 350 guests. In 1955, Kenneth B. Phillips Sr., the Minnewaska general manager, bought the property from the Smiley family. Cliff House was abandoned in 1972 due to maintenance costs; it burned to the ground in 1978. Wildmere closed in 1979 and burned to the ground in 1986.

After years of wrangling over commercial development proposals and lawsuits to block development, New York State bought the property in 1987 and opened the Minnewaska State Park Preserve in 1993. A significant expansion of 5,400 acres (22 km^{2}) occurred in 1996 when the Open Space Institute transferred acreage to the park preserve from the old Ellenville watershed lands, now called Sam's Point Preserve. The preserve was managed by the Nature Conservancy and by the Open Space Institute until April 2015, at which time management was transferred to the New York State Office of Parks, Recreation and Historic Preservation and the Palisades Interstate Park Commission.

Located within the Minnewaska State Park Preserve and neighboring Mohonk Preserve is the Trapps Mountain Hamlet Historic District, listed on the National Register of Historic Places in 2000.

=== Early 21st-century expansion ===
In March 2006, an additional 2,500 acres (10 km^{2}) were added to the preserve as a result of action by a coalition of conservation groups including the New York - New Jersey Trail Conference, Open Space Institute, Friends of the Shawangunks, and Nature Conservancy. The success was made possible in part because the real estate partnership that sought to develop the Awosting Reserve property collapsed due to an internal financial dispute. To settle this dispute among the partners, a court ordered that the property be sold. The Trust for Public Land purchased the property for $17 million and immediately turned the land over to New York State. Awosting Falls was featured in Season 2 of Severance.

== Ecological characteristics ==
Unique communities such as ice cave talus, pitch pine-oak-heath rocky summit, and extensive chestnut oak forest comprise Minnewaska State Park Preserve. These ecosystems host a variety of plants and animals that are uncommon in New York State. Wildlife such as the timber rattlesnake (Crotalus horridus), bobcat (Lynx rufus) and New York State's only documented occurrence of the noctuid moth Zale curema reside within the preserve.

== Swimming in Lake Minnewaska ==
Swimming was allowed throughout the entirety of Lake Minnewaska and surrounding Lake Awosting and Peterskill areas until 1987 when New York State purchased the land and closed the lake to public recreation. In 1988 under the guidance of Helga Schwartz and through numerous petitions, swimming was reinstated in a small roped off area.

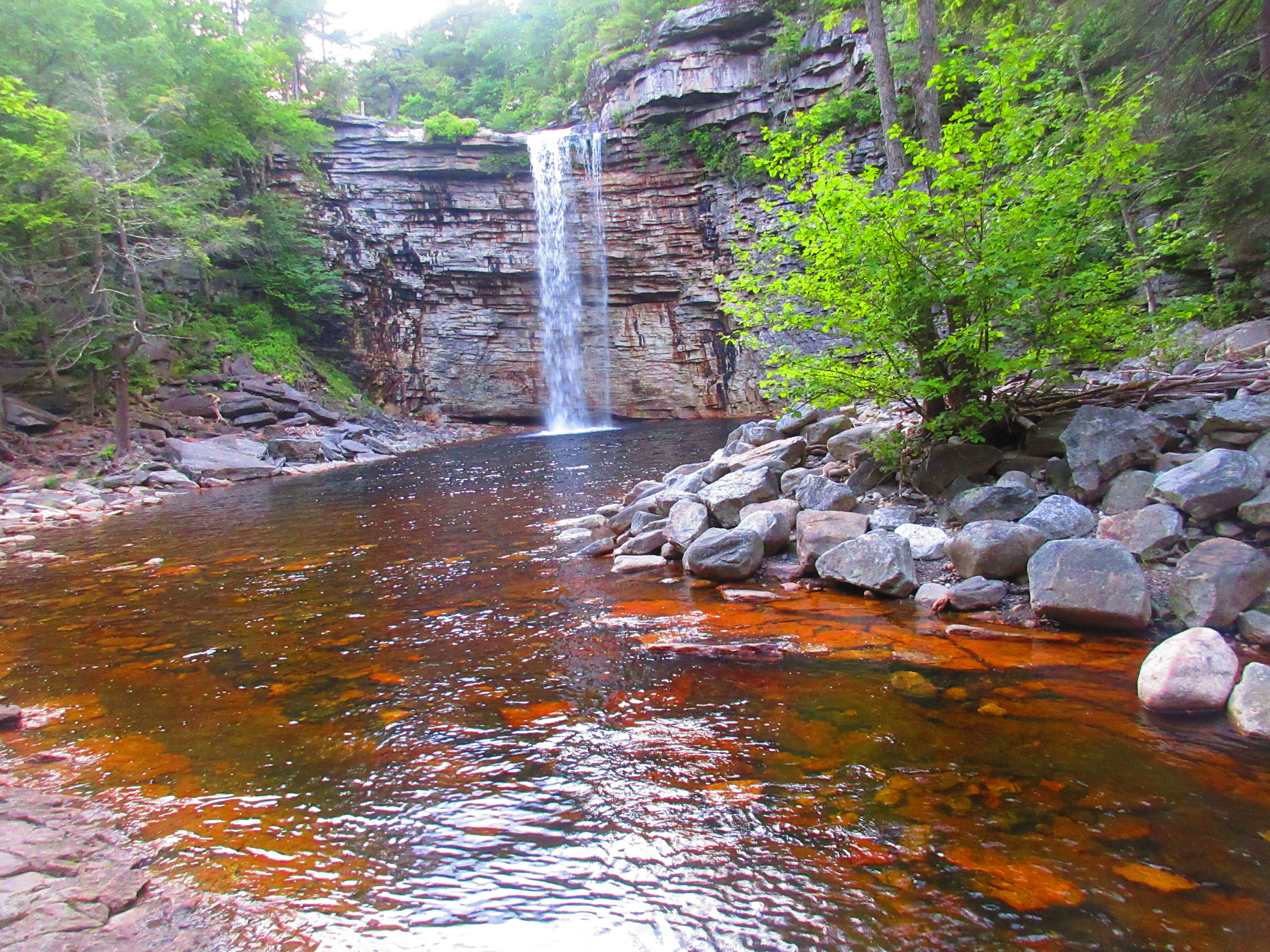
Awosting Falls.

On April 19, 2000 Judy Mage, Myriam Miedzian, and Ellen James met with Park officials and the PIPC (Palisades Interstate Park Commission) to present proposals for the allowance of distance swimming on the lake. As a result of this meeting the designated swim area in the lake was increased and the closing time for swimming was extended by half an hour.

On June 11, 2000 SWIM (Swim Without Interference at Minnewaska) was created to attempt to bring back swimming throughout the entire lake. After much debate and negotiations with Parks officials, SWIM proposed the formation of a club where members would be tested for swimming ability, purchase insurance cards, and sign release of liability forms. The group was able to secure a second swimming area consisting of a 200-yard buoyed cable that runs parallel to the shoreline for distance swimming.

In Spring 2002 SWIM became the Minnewaska Distance Swimmers Association (MDSA) and signed up 430 members its first year. As of 2009 the MDSA has close to 700 members.

== Image gallery ==
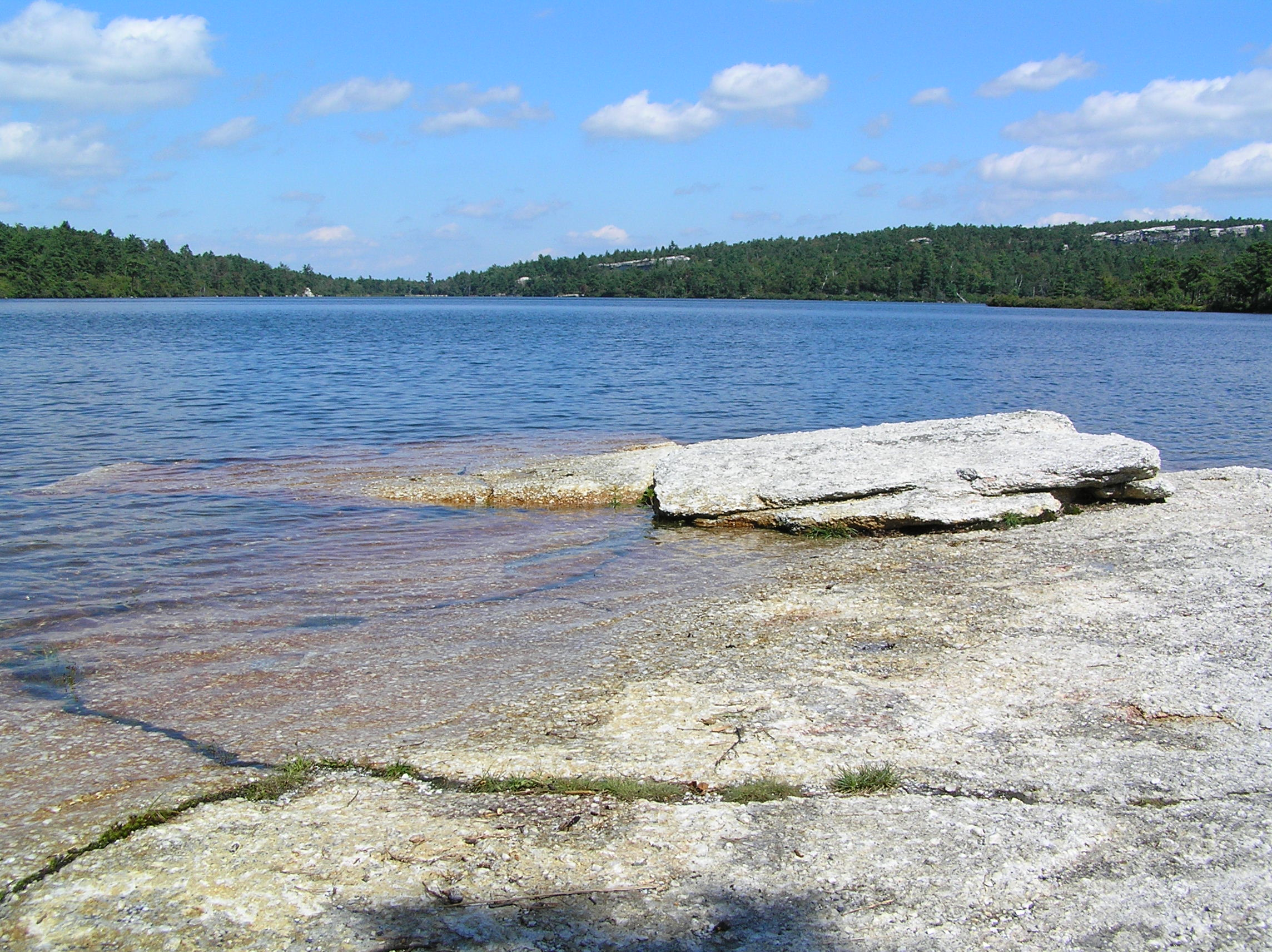
Lake Awosting

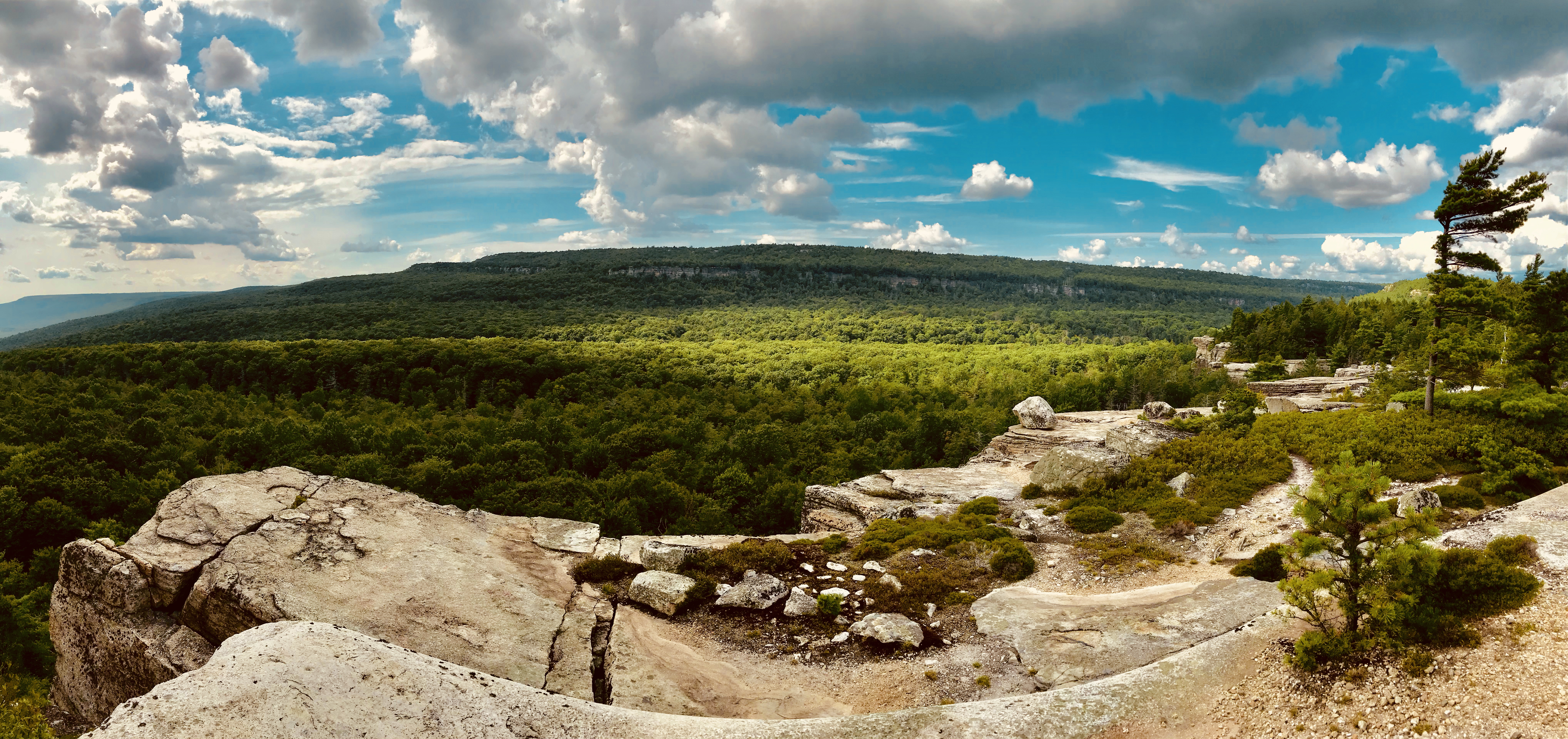
Palmaghatt Kills Ravine, Old Growth Forest

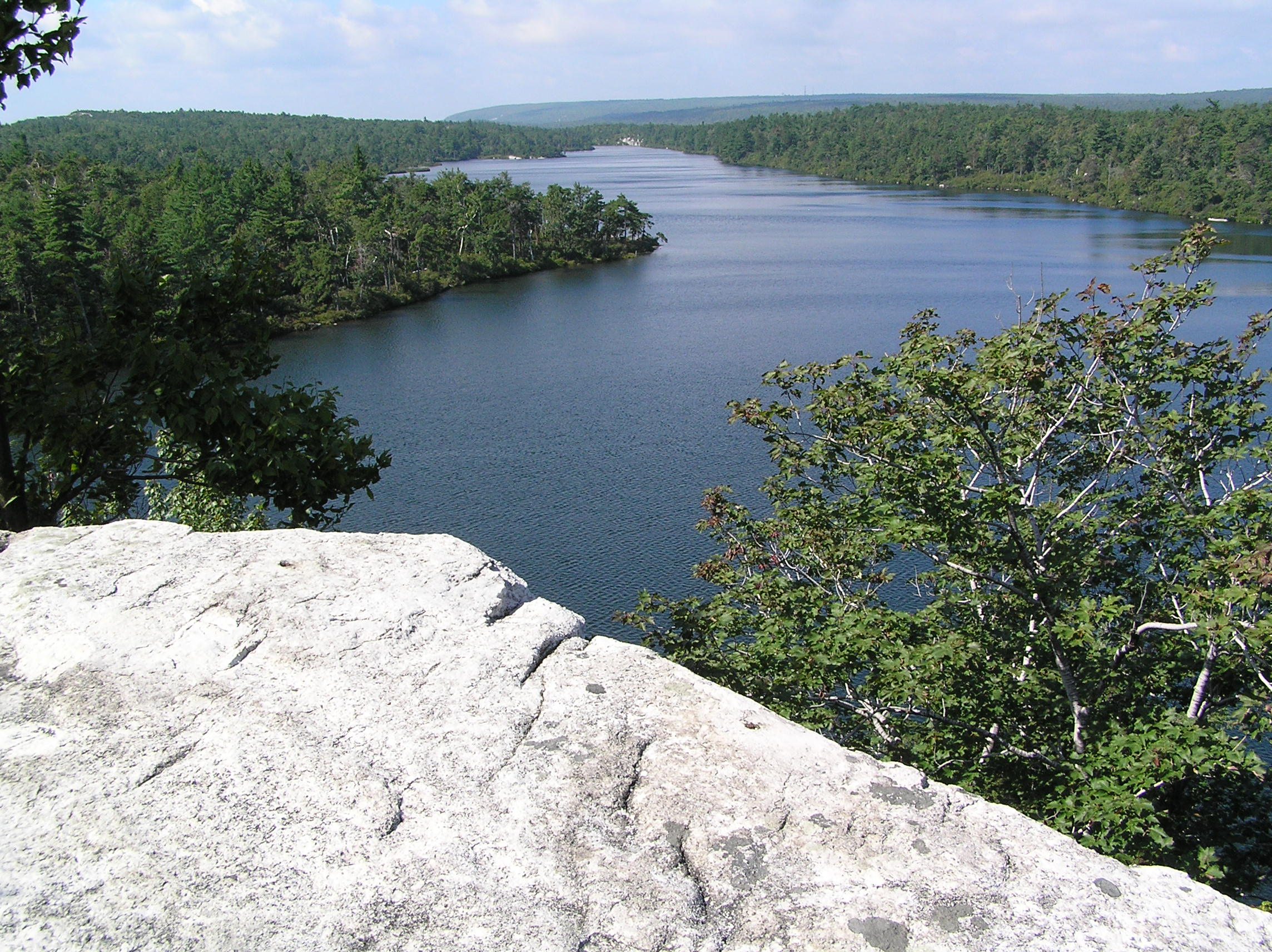
A view of Lake Awosting from the cliffs

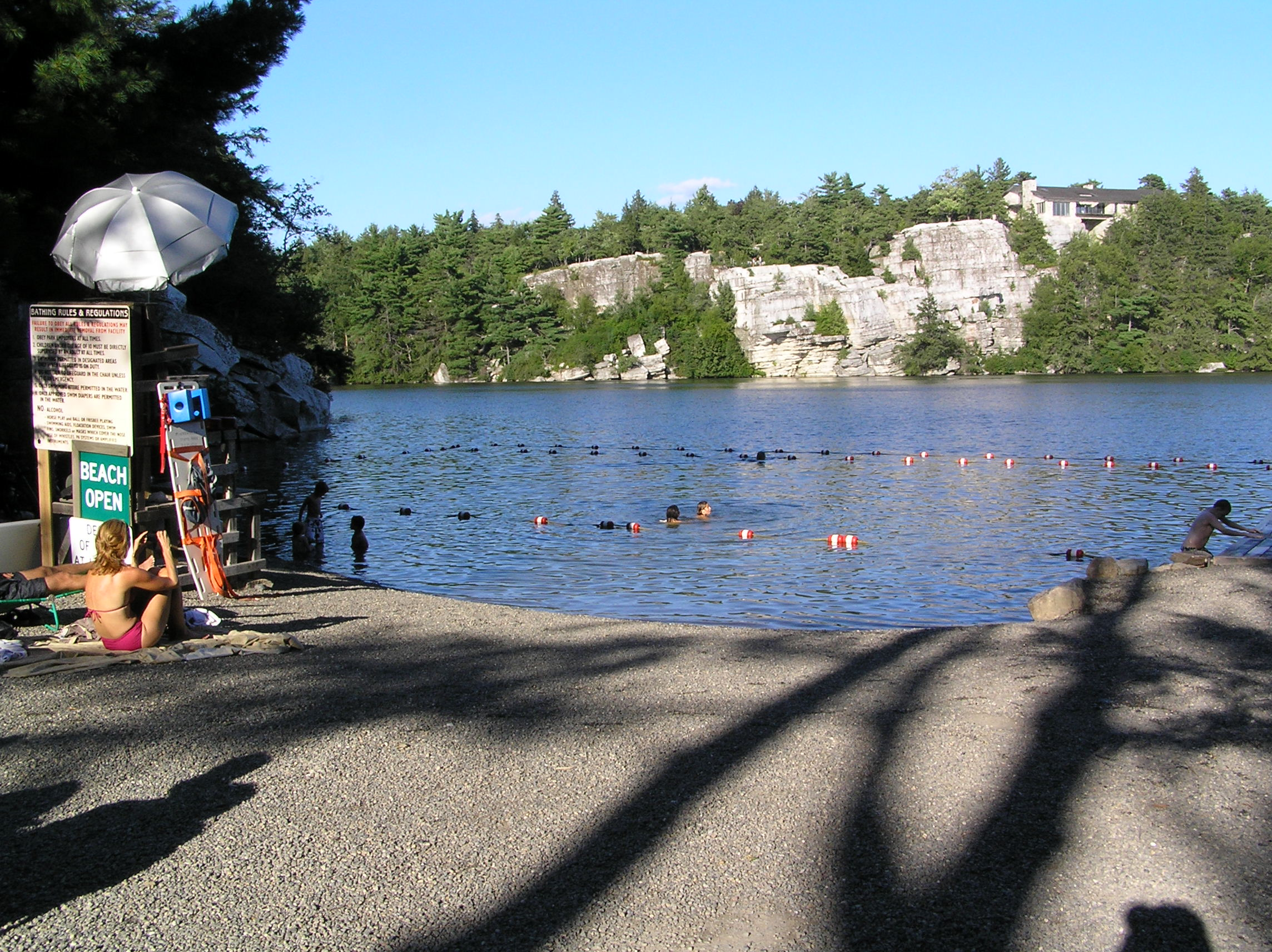
The swimmer's beach at Lake Minnewaska

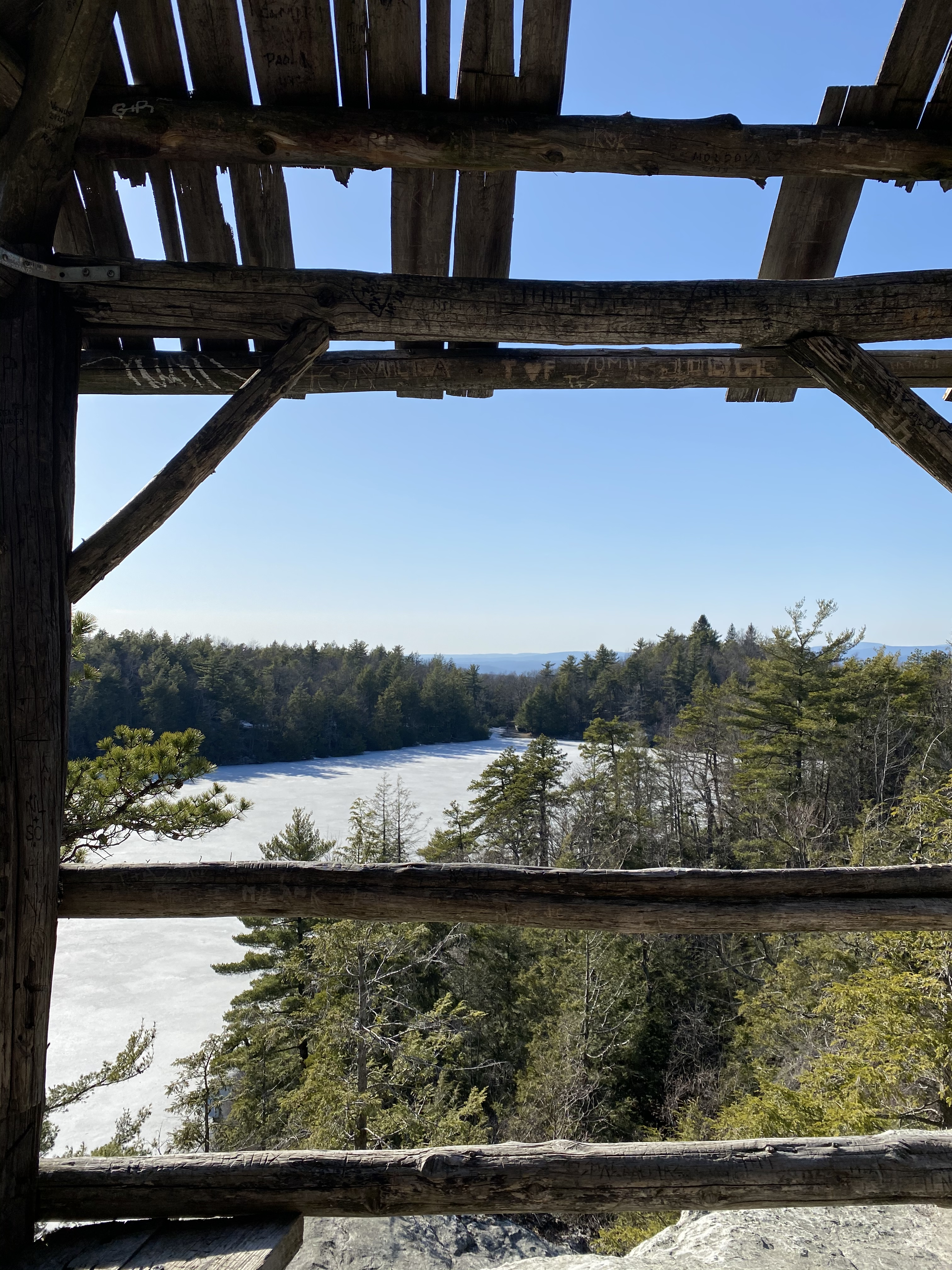
Frozen lake, Minnewaska State park in late March, 2021

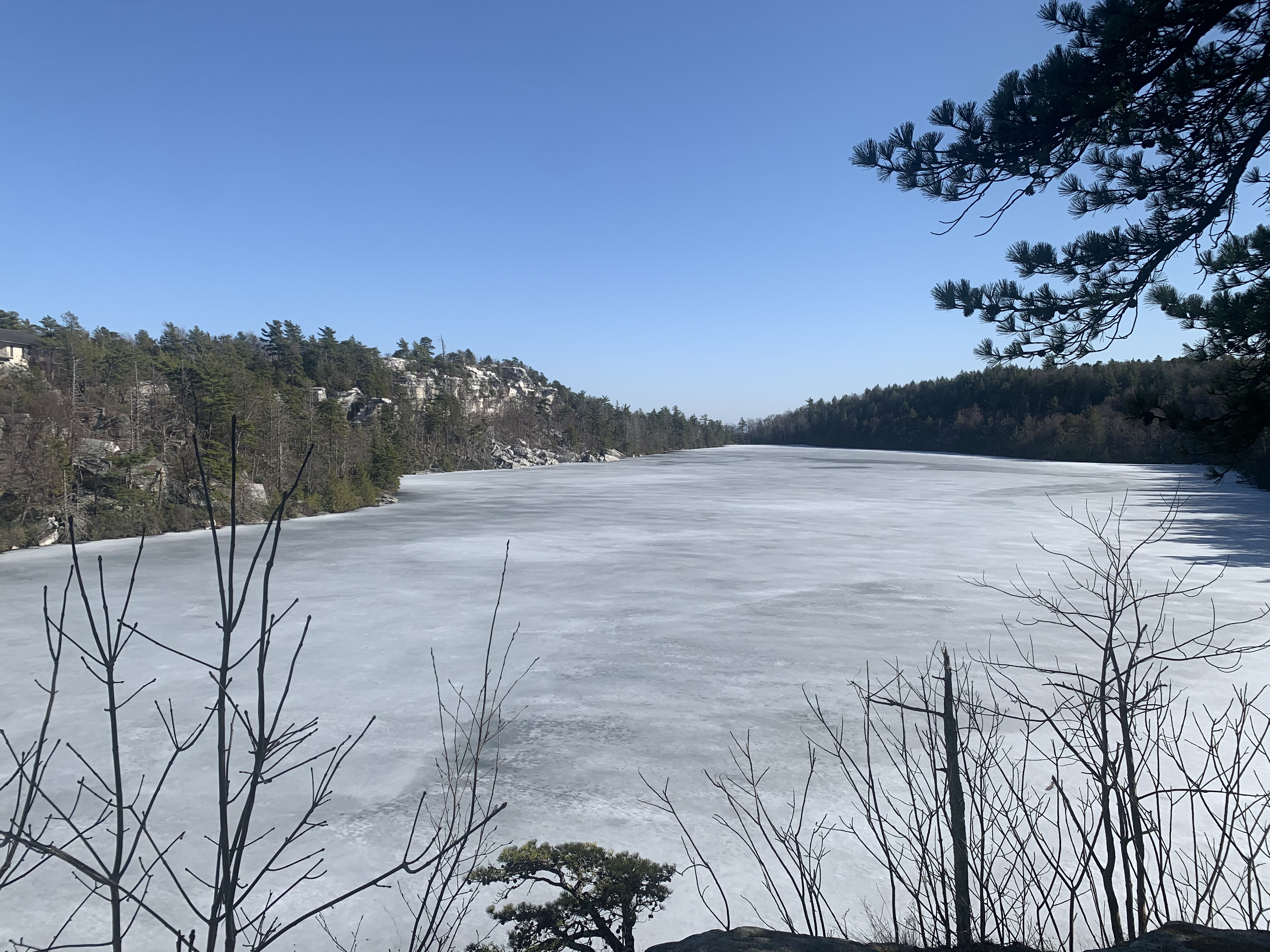
Frozen Lake Minnewaska, March 2021
