= Judy Mage =

American activist

- Born: 1935 (age 90–91); The Bronx, New York
- Education: Antioch College
- Organization(s): Social Service Employee Union (SSEU), Minnewaska Distance Swimmers Association (MDSA)
- Known for: labor organizing and other activism

Judy Mage (born 1935) is an American activist known for her militant labor activism as a New York City welfare caseworker in the Social Service Employee Union (SSEU) in the 1960s. She served in leadership roles including vice president and president. She organized strikes and other work disruptions to pressure the city to raise salaries and improve working conditions. A longtime resident of New Paltz, New York, she successfully lobbied the state to expand the swimming area in the Minnewaska State Park Preserve in the early 2000s.

== Early life and education ==
Born in 1935 in the Bronx, New York, Mage grew up in a middle-class Jewish family. She attended public schools in New York City, including City College. At Antioch College, she befriended Eleanor Holmes Norton and led a socialist student group. She graduated with a sociology degree in 1957.

== Labor organizing with the SSEU ==
Motivated by a desire to end poverty, Mage worked as a caseworker for a year in Dayton, Ohio. She moved to the New York City Welfare Department in 1960. Her worksite, Amsterdam Center, was located near Pennsylvania Station. Due to difficult working conditions, including large caseloads and an office she described as a "gray factory floor", Mage became involved in the labor movement. She joined the SSEU, where she gained a reputation for outspokenness and progressive ideas and assisted in SSEU's successful application for recognition from the city. About 45% of the membership were women, but Mage was one of the few women in leadership positions. As SSEU vice president, Mage joined the president and two other union leaders in filing a complaint about their excessive caseloads to the federal Department of Health, Education, and Welfare. As a result, the city Welfare Commissioner James R. Dumpson suspended them from their jobs for 2 months.

On 4 January 1965, SSEU and AFSCME Local 371 led 8,000 Welfare Department employees in a strike. Due to a law against strikes by public employees, most of the workers were fired. Two thirds of the city's welfare offices were closed for the next 28 days as workers picketed. Other unions including the United Federation of Teachers donated to the strike fund. Mage later recalled printing flyers every night and subsisting on very little sleep until the last few days of the strike when she and other union leaders were imprisoned for defying a court order to return to work. As a result of the strike, the workers gained a contract with salary raises and caseload limits; however, the contract was not properly implemented by the city.

SSEU was split between two camps: Mage and many of the newer staff wanted to include their clients' concerns in bargaining, while the president and many of the older staff wanted to focus on workers' concerns. In 1966, Mage was elected president of SSEU. As president, she had a reputation for toughness and taking an "imaginative approach" to union organizing. She organized strikes, sit-ins, and other work disruptions. That October, she organized a "live-in" at the office of the Labor Commissioner because of a dispute over which union would represent the welfare workers. Mage and a group of workers brought food, a clothesline, air mattresses, and a sign that said: "Mary Poppins is a junkie" to the commissioners' office. They slept there for a week until they were arrested.

The city responded to the work disruptions by locking the workers out of their worksites and threatening to stop collecting union dues from workers' paychecks on behalf of the union. Although SSEU's actions led the city to promise to hire more trainee workers to alleviate caseloads, SSEU ultimately did not get their demands in their contract negotiations. Their next contract included low pay raises and no mechanism to enforce caseload limits. Mage finished her term as president in 1968 and was ineligible to run again due to the SSEU constitution.

== Political involvement ==
Mage was a member of the Socialist Workers Party and a Trotskyite. In the 1968 presidential election, Mage ran for vice president with Eldridge Cleaver as part of the Peace and Freedom Party. She was on the ballot in New York, while various candidates ran as Cleaver's vice president in other states. They were interviewed on WBAI about their platform.

== Hudson Valley ==
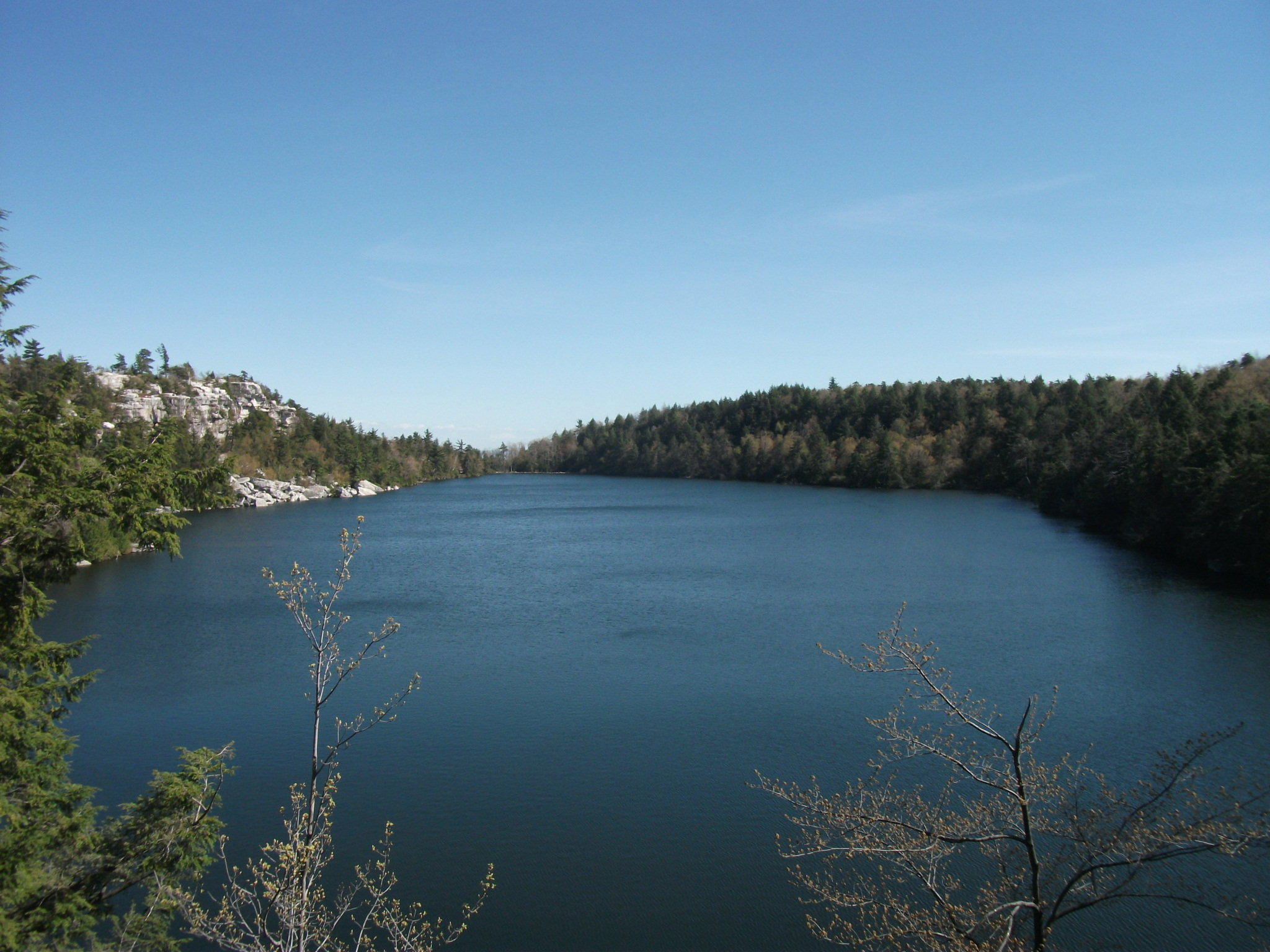
Lake Minnewaska

Mage participated in protests against a proposed Marriott resort near Lake Minnewaska in New York in the late 1970s. Ultimately, the resort was not built, and the state later created the Minnewaska State Park Preserve. Citing safety concerns and laws against swimming in deep water, the state restricted swimming in the 34-acre lake to a small roped off section that accounted for less than 1% of the lake. Mage, an avid swimmer, was disappointed that her access to the lake had decreased. In 2000, she co-founded a group called Swim Without Interference at Minnewaska (SWIM) to lobby park officials to change their policies. Specifically, Mage proposed opening a larger area to anyone who could pass a swimming test. The group organized a petition and held multiple demonstrations, including a "swim in" where they displayed signs with slogans like “No Swimming, No Peace” and “Let Us Swim!” By 2002, the state agreed to open a larger area for swimming. To qualify for access, swimmers have to demonstrate that they can swim 500 yards and tread water for 3 minutes in a local pool. They also pay a fee to join the Minnewaska Distance Swimmers Association (MDSA), which was founded and organized by Mage.

As a member of the Bike/Ped Commission, Mage advocated for street safety in New Paltz, New York, including successfully lobbying County executive Michael P. Hein to add shoulders to a road used by students to walk and bike to school. In 2021, she was recognized by New York State Senator Jen Metzger for her “tireless work to bring new experiences in nature and the outdoors to Ulster County communities.” She has also participated in Gaza war protests.

== Personal life ==
In 1956, she married her husband, an economics professor at Brooklyn Polytechnic Institute. They traveled through Algeria and Morocco and published articles in The Nation with their observations about French colonialism and the Moroccan labor movement in 1959. Their apartment was located on Riverside Drive in Manhattan. While involved with SSEU in the 1960s, Mage had affairs with several women, including a woman from a rival union local whom she met while they were jailed together for striking. She later told an interviewer that she assumed her colleagues knew about the affairs but did not say anything, partly out of respect for her and partly because she was married to a man. She also read The Ladder and attended lesbian gatherings.

Mage has a son. She married her longtime partner in 2011, and they live in New Paltz, New York.
