= Peace and Freedom Party =

Socialist political party in the United States

- Leader: Central Committee
- Founded: June 23, 1967; 59 years ago
- Registered voters (May 2026): 154,305
- Ideology: Eco-socialism; Pacifism; Socialist feminism
- Political position: Left-wing
- Members in elected offices: 1

Website
- peaceandfreedom.us

2016 PFP convention delegates vote on their preferred candidates

The Peace and Freedom Party (PFP) is a socialist political party in the United States which operates mostly in California. It was formed in 1967 from anti-Vietnam War and pro-civil rights movements.

Notable past and present members include Bob Avakian, Emmy Lou Packard, Byron Randall, and briefly Murray Rothbard and Howie Hawkins.

As of 2026, the PFP is the 6th-largest political party in the United States by voter registration, below the Conservative Party of New York State and above the Constitution Party. (Note: Voter registration ranks are listed here. This list excludes the many different "Independent" parties, with which many voters register in error, and which usually do not run any competitive candidates.) The PFP has had some wins in local elections and no wins in state or federal elections. PFP operates both as an organization unto itself and an umbrella organization in which socialist organizations compete to win PFP's ballot access.

== Ideology ==
PFP is a socialist party "committed to feminism, [...] democracy, ecology, and racial equality", PFP strongly supports environmentalism, indigenous rights, LGBT rights, abortion rights, public healthcare, public education, and subsidized housing. PFP is anti-Zionist.

== History ==
=== Founding ===
After the 1967 Century City anti-Vietnam War march on June 23, 1967, anti-war and civil rights supporters began collecting petitions for the Peace and Freedom Party. PFP's founders opposed the Democratic Party's support for the war in Vietnam and saw the Democrats as failing to effectively support the civil rights movement.

On January 2, 1968, PFP organizers submitted 105,100 signatures to receive party status in California. PFP has had ballot access in California since 1968, except between 1998 and 2002. In 2003, PFP became the first party in the history of California to regain its ballot status.

In 1968, PFP suffered a minor split: Dick Gregory and others split to create the Freedom and Peace Party (FPP), for which Gregory ran in the 1968 United States presidential election. The FPP collapsed after the 1968 election.

In 1971, progressives nationwide organized the People's Party. In 1972 and 1976, PFP endorsed the PP's candidates. After the PP dissolved in 1977, PFP continued in California.

=== Registered voters ===
The following shows the total number of voters registered with the Peace and Freedom Party in California as of January (Note: With the exception of 2014, where the data shown is from December 31, 2013, as this was the closest to January that registration reporting was made available for that year) of each major election year since 2004 (the first year they met ballot qualifications).

Year	Voters	%
2004	71,441	0.48%
2006	59,193	0.38%
2008	57,182	0.36%
2010	55,036	0.33%
2012	59,012	0.35%
2014	76,268	0.43%
2016	75,579	0.44%
2018	75,094	0.40%
2020	94,016	0.46%
2022	113,278	0.51%
2024	133,914	0.61%
2026	149,397	0.65%

== Election results ==
The PFP has fielded over 200 electoral candidates in the United States for local, state, and federal offices. PFP candidates usually run as official PFP candidates on their own ballot line.

In 2026, Peace and Freedom Party candidate Frank Lara was elected to the South San Francisco Unified School District.

=== Presidential elections ===
Year	Presidential candidate	Vice presidential candidate	Popular votes	%	Electoral votes	Result	Ballot access	Notes	Ref
2024	Claudia De la Cruz	Karina Garcia	167,772	0.11%	0	Lost	220 / 538	The Party for Socialism and Liberation also nominated De la Cruz. (Note: 2024: Votes in California: 72,539 (0.5%))	
2020	Gloria La Riva	Sunil Freeman	85,188	0.05%	0	Lost	191 / 538	The Party for Socialism and Liberation also nominated La Riva, with Leonard Peltier as her running mate. (Note: 2020: "Ballot access" above includes all states where La Riva was not a write-in; ie, where they were a listed PSL, PFP, or LUP candidate.) (Note: 2020: Votes in California: 50,887 (0.29%))	
2016	Gloria La Riva	Dennis Banks	74,405	0.05%	0	Lost	112 / 538	The Party for Socialism and Liberation also nominated La Riva, with Eugene Puryear as her running mate. (Note: 2016: "Ballot access" above includes all states where La Riva was not a write-in; ie, where they were a listed PSL, PFP, or LUP candidate.) (Note: 2016: Votes in California: 66,101 (0.46%))	
2012	Roseanne Barr	Cindy Sheehan	67,477	0.05%	0	Lost	141 / 538	(Note: 2012: Votes in California: 53,824 (0.41%))	
2008	Ralph Nader	Matt Gonzalez	739,034	0.56%	0	Lost	456 / 538	(Note: 2008: Votes in California: 108,381 (0.8%))	
2004	Leonard Peltier	Janice Jordan	27,607	0.02%	0	Lost	55 / 538	(Note: 2004: Votes in California: 27,607 (0.22%))	
1996	Marsha Feinland	Kate McClatchy	25,332	0.03%	0	Lost	54 / 538	(Note: 1996: Votes in California: 25,332 (0.25%))	
1992	Ronald Daniels	Asiba Tupahache	27,961	0.03%	0	Lost	136 / 538	(Note: 1992: Votes in California: 18,597 (0.21%))	
1984	Sonia Johnson	Emma Wong Mar	72,161	0.08%	0	Lost	227 / 538	(Note: 1984: Votes in California: 26,297 (0.28%))	
1980	Maureen Smith	Elizabeth Cervantes Barron	18,116	0.02%	0	Lost		(Note: 1980: Votes in California: 18,116 (0.21%))	
1976	Margaret Wright	Benjamin Spock	49,016	0.06%	0	Lost		Ran on the People's Party ballot line (Note: 1976: Votes in California: 41,731 (0.53%))	
1972	Benjamin Spock	Julius Hobson	78,759	0.10%	0	Lost		Ran on the People's Party ballot line (Note: 1972: Votes in California: 55,167 (0.66%))	
1968	Eldridge Cleaver	Peggy Terry, Judy Mage	36,571	0.05%	0	Lost		(Note: The Freedom and Peace Party, which had split from the Peace and Freedom Party, nominated Dick Gregory for President and Mark Lane for Vice President. It received 47,149 votes.) (Note: 1968: Votes in California: 27,707 (0.38%))	

=== Presidential preference primaries ===
Like many minor parties in California, PFP holds a non-binding "preference primary" for President. The PFP presidential candidate is ultimately selected by the PFP State Convention, at which only State Central Committee (SCC) members can vote.The SCC consists primarily of members of county central committees, who are elected in the state presidential primary elections. The SCC had about 130 members in 2024 and 90 in 2008.

Since January 2001, California has had a "modified" closed primary system in which political parties may choose to allow voters who are not affiliated with any party, or No Party Preference, to participate in the party's primary; the Peace and Freedom Party has never chosen to do so.

In 2016, both PFP's California state chair and Green candidate Jill Stein requested that the California Secretary of State allow Stein to be placed on the PFP party ballot, but this was rejected. Instead, PFP nominated Party for Socialism and Liberation candidate Gloria La Riva.

==== Presidential nominating conventions ====
The party nominated its 1968 presidential ticket at the 1968 Peace and Freedom National Convention. The party (as part of the People's Party) nominated its tickets in the next two elections at the 1972 People's National Convention and 1975 People's National Convention.

After being relegated to a party with automatic ballot access in only California, the party's presidential nominees have been decided at state nominating conventions.

Party convention (SCC) state presidential nominating convention votes:

Year	Total	PSL	Greens	WWP	FSP	SPUSA	NAP	IWP	Independents	Abstentions	Ref
2024	about 130	99 Claudia de la Cruz							about 30 across Cornel West & Jasmine Sherman		
2020	68	62 Gloria La Riva	3 Howie Hawkins							3	
2016	80	56 Gloria La Riva	9 Jill Stein	12 Monica Moorehead					1 Lynn Kahn (Note: In 2016, Kahn also ran for the Reform Party presidential primary.)		
2012 (2nd ballot)	64	37 Roseanne Barr (Note: In 2012, PSL supported Peta Lindsay, who was too young to qualify for the ballot. Roseanne Barr was nominally independent, but was tactically supported by the Party for Socialism and Liberation.)			16 Stephen Durham	6 Stewart Alexander				5	
2012 (1st ballot)	63	29 Roseanne Barr			18 Stephen Durham	12 Stewart Alexander				4	
2008	89	27 Gloria La Riva	6 Cynthia McKinney			10 Brian Moore			46 Ralph Nader		
1996	17			8 Monica Moorehead					9 Marsha Feinland		
1992	211						91 Lenora Fulani		120 Ronald Daniels (of Rainbow Coalition)		
1988	200						Lenora Fulani	Herb Lewin			
1984									Sonia Johnson (of Citizens Party)		

In 2012, Rocky Anderson won a plurality of delegates in PFP's non-binding preference primary, after failing to win enough votes to place his Justice Party on the ballot. However, Anderson failed to win representatives on the PFP's Central Committee, and withdrew 1 week before the convention. Instead, PFP backed Party for Socialism and Liberation's preferred candidate Roseanne Barr.

In 2008, PFP endorsed Independent Ralph Nader in his presidential campaign. Nader obtained enough signatures to appear on the ballot in Iowa and Utah as the Peace and Freedom Party candidate. This was the first expansion of the party beyond California since the 1970s. However, PFP did not obtain enough votes to guarantee ballot access in Iowa or Utah in subsequent elections.

In 2000, PFP did not qualify for the ballot in California.

In 1988, three factions within PFP — the Internationalist Workers Party, New Alliance Party, and Socialist Party USA plus Communist Party USA — sought the party's ballot line. They could not agree, and split the convention, which resulted in the Secretary of State voiding the PFP ballot line for the year.

=== Congressional elections ===
Year	Candidate	Chamber	District	Votes	%	Result	Notes	Ref
2024	John Parker	House	37th	7,316	8.4%	Lost	all-party blanket primary, did not advance to general	
2022	José Cortés	House	51st	3,343	2.2%	Lost	all-party blanket primary, did not advance to general	
2022	John Parker	Senate	At-Large	105,477 (Note: In addition to running in the regularly scheduled election, Parker also ran as a write-in candidate in the special election for the same exact seat, but for a term to expire on January 3, 2023. Parker received 9,951 votes, or 0.1 percent, as a write-in candidate in the special election race.)	1.7%	Lost	all-party blanket primary, did not advance to general	
2020	José Cortés	House	50th	1,821	0.9%	Lost	all-party blanket primary, did not advance to general	
2018	John Parker	Senate	At-Large	22,825	0.3%	Lost	all-party blanket primary, did not advance to general	
2016	Joe Williams	House	20th	6,400	3.9%	Lost	all-party blanket primary, did not advance to general	
2014	Adam Shbeita	House	44th	9,192	13.35%	Lost	general election	
2010	Mike Roskey	House	3rd	4,789	1.83%	Lost		
2010	Gerald Allen Frink	House	5th	4,594	2.66%	Lost		
2010	Eugene Ruyle	House	6th	5,915	2.26%	Lost		
2010	Gloria La Riva	House	8th	5,161	2.46%	Lost		
2010	Larry Allen	House	9th	1,670	0.78%	Lost		
2010	Richard Castaldo	House	30th	3,115	1.31%	Lost		
2010	Miriam Clark	House	50th	5,470	2.18%	Lost		
2010	Marsha Feinland	Senate	At-Large	135,093	1.35%	Lost		
2008	Dina Padilla	House	3rd	13,378	4.26%	Lost		
2008	L Roberts	House	5th	10,731	4.85%	Lost		
2008	Bill Callison	House	7th	6,695	2.85%	Lost		
2008	Eugene Ruyle	House	10th	11,062	3.75%	Lost		
2008	Nathalie Hrizi	House	12th	5,793	2.17%	Lost		
2006	Timothy Stock	House	1st	3,503	1.61%	Lost		
2006	Michael Roskey	House	3rd	2,370	1.04%	Lost		
2006	John Reiger	House	5th	2,018	1.35%	Lost		
2006	Lynda Llamas	House	29th	2,599	1.81%	Lost		
2006	Adele Cannon	House	30th	4,546	2.15%	Lost		
2006	James Smith	House	36th	4,592	2.76%	Lost		
2006	Kevin Akin	House	44th	4,486	3%	Lost		
2006	Miriam Clark	House	50th	3,353	1.51%	Lost		
2006	Marsha Feinland	Senate	At-Large	117,764	1.38%	Lost		
2004	John Reiger	House	5th	3,670	1.9%	Lost		
2004	Leilani Dowell	House	8th	9,527	3.53%	Lost		
2004	Joe Williams	House	17th	2,823	1.26%	Lost		
2004	Alice Stek	House	36th	6,105	2.5%	Lost		
2004	Kevin Akin	House	44th	7,559	3.36%	Lost		
2004	Marsha Feinland	Senate	At-Large	243,846	2.02%	Lost		
1998	Ernest Jones Jr	House	1st	4,996	2.54%	Lost		
1998	Gerald Sanders	House	9th	4,767	2.81%	Lost		
1998	Ralph Shroyer	House	24th	1,860	1.03%	Lost		
1998	Janice Jordan	House	49th	2,447	1.32%	Lost		
1998	Ophie C. Beltran	Senate	At-Large	48,685	0.59%	Lost		
1996	Ernest Jones Jr	House	6th	6,459	2.54%	Lost		
1996	Tom Condit	House	9th	5,561	2.77%	Lost		
1996	Timothy Thompson	House	14th	3,653	1.59%	Lost		
1996	Ralph Shroyer	House	24th	6,267	2.92%	Lost		
1996	Justin Charles Gerber	House	25th	2,513	1.28%	Lost		
1996	John Peter Daly	House	29th	8,819	4.11%	Lost		
1996	Shirley Mandel	House	30th	2,499	3.1%	Lost		
1996	Kevin Akin	House	43rd	3,309	1.86%	Lost		
1996	Miriam Clark	House	51st	5,407	2.36%	Lost		
1996	Janice Jordan	House	52nd	3,649	2.05%	Lost		
1994	Ernest Jones Jr	House	6th	4,055	1.71%	Lost		
1994	William ""Bill"" Callison	House	7th	4,798	2.88%	Lost		
1994	Emma Wong Mar	House	9th	9,194	5.14%	Lost		
1994	Craig Cooper	House	10th	4,802	2.05%	Lost		
1994	John Honigsfeld	House	32nd	6,099	4.83%	Lost		
1994	Kermit Booker	House	33rd	7,694	18.54%	Lost		
1994	Richard Green	House	38th	2,995	2.05%	Lost		
1994	Donna White	House	48th	8,543	4.37%	Lost		
1994	Renate Kline	House	49th	4,948	2.66%	Lost		
1994	Guillermo Ramirez	House	50th	3,002	2.87%	Lost		
1994	Miriam Clark	House	51st	4,099	1.98%	Lost		
1994	Art Edelman	House	52nd	3,221	1.89%	Lost		
1994	Elizabeth Cervantes Barron	Senate	At-Large	255,301	3%	Lost		
1992	Phil Baldwin	House	1st	10,764	4.28%	Lost		
1992	David Franklin	House	7th	9,840	4.51%	Lost		
1992	Cesar Cadabes	House	8th	7,572	3.25%	Lost		
1992	Dave Linn	House	9th	10,472	4.58%	Lost		
1992	Mary Weldon	House	12th	10,142	4.44%	Lost		
1992	Roslyn Allen	House	13th	16,768	8.16%	Lost		
1992	David Wald	House	14th	3,912	1.51%	Lost		
1992	Amani Kuumba	House	16th	9,370	6.01%	Lost		
1992	Maureen Smith	House	17th	4,804	2.28%	Lost		
1992	Dorothy Wells	House	19th	13,334	6.15%	Lost		
1992	John Paul Linblad	House	24th	13,690	5.36%	Lost		
1992	Nancy Lawrence	House	25th	5,090	2.33%	Lost		
1992	Margery Hinds	House	26th	7,180	5.94%	Lost		
1992	Margaret Edwards	House	27th	7,329	3.45%	Lost		
1992	Susan Davies	House	29th	13,888	5.31%	Lost		
1992	Elizabeth Nakano	House	30th	6,173	7.39%	Lost		
1992	William Williams	House	32nd	9,782	5.66%	Lost		
1992	Tim Delia	House	33rd	2,135	4.2%	Lost		
1992	Alice Mae Miles	House	35th	2,797	2.24%	Lost		
1992	Owen Staley	House	36th	13,297	3.78%	Lost		
1992	B Kwaku Duren	House	37th	16,178	14.27%	Lost		
1992	Paul Burton	House	38th	8,391	4.43%	Lost		
1992	Margie Akin	House	40th	11,839	5.77%	Lost		
1992	Mike Noonan	House	41st	10,136	5.94%	Lost		
1992	Macine Wuirk	House	47th	12,297	4.84%	Lost		
1992	Donna White	House	48th	13,396	5.81%	Lost		
1992	Wilton Zaslow	House	49th	4,738	1.9%	Lost		
1992	Roger Batchelder	House	50th	4,250	3.11%	Lost		
1992	Miriam Clark	House	51st	10,307	4.07%	Lost		
1992	Dennis Gretsinger	House	52nd	5,734	2.68%	Lost		
1992	Gerald Horne	Senate	At-Large	305,697	2.84%	Lost		
1992	Genevieve Torres	Senate	At-Large	372,817	3.45%	Lost		
1990	Darlene Comingore	House	1st	34,011	14.77%	Lost		
1990	Jan Tucker	House	22nd	3,963	2.19%	Lost		
1990	John Honigsfeld	House	23rd	6,834	4.09%	Lost		
1990	Maggie Phair	House	24th	5,706	5.49%	Lost		
1990	Edward Ferrer	House	27th	7,101	4.55%	Lost		
1990	William Williams	House	28th	2,723	2.85%	Lost		
1990	Maxine Quirk	House	39th	6,709	3.85%	Lost		
1990	Karen R Works	House	41st	15,428	7.18%	Lost		
1990	Doug Hansen	House	43rd	40,212	18.1%	Lost		
1990	Donna White	House	44th	5,237	4.82%	Lost		
1988	Eric Fried	House	1st	22,150	8.72%	Lost		
1988	Theodore ""Ted"" Zuur	House	5th	3,975	2.27%	Lost		
1988	Tom Condit	House	8th	5,444	2.22%	Lost		
1988	Victor Martinez	House	11th	2,906	1.42%	Lost		
1988	Shirley Rachel Isaacson	House	22nd	6,298	2.66%	Lost		
1988	John Honigsfeld	House	23rd	3,316	1.42%	Lost		
1988	James Green	House	24th	3,571	2.3%	Lost		
1988	Paul Reyes	House	25th	8,746	8.76%	Lost		
1988	Salomea Honigsfeld	House	28th	2,811	1.95%	Lost		
1988	B Kwaku Duren	House	31st	4,091	2.9%	Lost		
1988	Vikki Murdock	House	32nd	4,032	2.35%	Lost		
1988	Mike Noonan	House	33rd	3,492	1.59%	Lost		
1988	Frank German	House	38th	3,547	2.41%	Lost		
1988	Gretchen Farsai	House	40th	3,699	1.37%	Lost		
1988	C Weber	House	41st	4,853	1.7%	Lost		
1988	Richard Rose	House	42nd	6,563	2.75%	Lost		
1988	M. Elizabeth Munoz	Senate	At-Large	166,600	1.71%	Lost		
1986	Elden Mcfarland	House	1st	12,149	5.93%	Lost		
1986	Theodore ""Ted"" Zuur	House	5th	2,078	1.27%	Lost		
1986	Lawrence Manuel	House	8th	4,295	2.12%	Lost		
1986	Bradley Mayer	House	10th	1,701	1.42%	Lost		
1986	Ron Wright	House	16th	2,017	1.23%	Lost		
1986	Joel Lorimer	House	22nd	2,930	1.53%	Lost		
1986	Tom Hopke	House	23rd	2,521	1.36%	Lost		
1986	James Green	House	24th	5,388	4.56%	Lost		
1986	Thomas O'connor Jr	House	27th	2,078	1.2%	Lost		
1986	B Kwaku Duren	House	31st	2,333	2.13%	Lost		
1986	John Donohue	House	32nd	2,799	2.11%	Lost		
1986	Mike Noonan	House	33rd	2,500	1.51%	Lost		
1986	Frank Boeheim	House	39th	2,752	1.56%	Lost		
1986	Steve Sears	House	40th	5,025	2.51%	Lost		
1986	Kate Mcclatchy	House	42nd	4,761	2.47%	Lost		
1986	Shirley Isaacson	House	44th	1,676	1.53%	Lost		
1986	Paul Kangas	Senate	At-Large	33,869	0.46%	Lost		
1984	Henry Clark	House	5th	3,574	1.85%	Lost		
1984	Charles John Zekan	House	19th	4,161	1.83%	Lost		
1984	James Green	House	24th	2,780	1.81%	Lost		
1984	Thomas O'connor Jr	House	27th	3,815	1.79%	Lost		
1984	Patrick Mccoy	House	32nd	2,051	1.21%	Lost		
1984	Mike Noonan	House	33rd	2,371	1.14%	Lost		
1984	Kevin Akin	House	35th	29,990	14.53%	Lost		
1984	Michael Schuyles Bright	House	38th	3,021	1.86%	Lost		
1984	Maxine Bell Quirk	House	40th	3,969	1.56%	Lost		
1984	John Donohue	House	42nd	5,811	2.39%	Lost		
1982	Howard Fegarsky	House	2nd	3,126	1.56%	Lost		
1982	John Reiger	House	3rd	6,294	2.9%	Lost		
1982	Timothy-Allen Albertson	House	6th	2,366	1.29%	Lost		
1982	Wilson Branch	House	11th	1,928	1%	Lost		
1982	Charles Zekan	House	19th	1,520	0.82%	Lost		
1982	Eugene Ruyle	House	32nd	3,473	2.38%	Lost		
1982	James Michael Noonan	House	33rd	2,223	1.29%	Lost		
1982	Frank Boeheim	House	39th	3,152	1.76%	Lost		
1982	Maxine Bell Quirk	House	40th	4,826	2.39%	Lost		
1982	John Donohue	House	42nd	5,514	2.66%	Lost		
1982	David Wald	Senate	At-Large	96,388	1.23%	Lost		
1980	Linda Wren	House	2nd	3,354	1.28%	Lost		
1980	Wilson Branch	House	11th	13,723	7.42%	Lost		
1980	Adele Fumino	House	12th	3,184	1.6%	Lost		
1980	Robert Goldsborough	House	13th	3,791	1.69%	Lost		
1980	Jan Tucker	House	21st	2,038	1.33%	Lost		
1980	Maggie Feigin	House	24th	5,905	4.02%	Lost		
1980	John Donohue	House	34th	7,794	4.06%	Lost		
1980	James Michael ""Mike"" Noonan	House	35th	5,492	2.82%	Lost		
1980	David Wald	Senate	At-Large	196,260	2.36%	Lost		
1978	Irv Sutley	House	2nd	6,097	2.77%	Lost		
1978	Lawrence Phillips	House	9th	5,562	4.12%	Lost		
1978	Adele Fumino	House	12th	3,022	1.89%	Lost		
1978	Robert Goldsborough Iii	House	13th	5,246	2.99%	Lost		
1978	Milton Shiro Takei	House	19th	6,887	4.01%	Lost		
1978	Bill Hill	House	21st	5,750	4.63%	Lost		
1978	Kevin Casey Peters	House	24th	6,453	4.75%	Lost		
1976	Robert Allred	House	2nd	6,444	2.98%	Lost		
1976	Emily Siegel	House	6th	6,570	5.02%	Lost		
1976	Robert Evans	House	8th	6,238	3.17%	Lost		
1976	Albert Sargis	House	9th	3,386	2.06%	Lost		
1976	Bill Hill	House	21st	7,178	4.69%	Lost		
1976	Marilyn Seals	House	25th	4,922	6.1%	Lost		
1976	David Wald	Senate	At-Large	104,383	1.4%	Lost		
1968	Huey P. Newton	House	7th	12,164	7.5%	Lost		

=== Statewide elections ===
Year	Candidate	Office	Votes	%	Result	Notes	Ref
2026	Ramsey Robinson	Governor	51,803	0.6%	Lost	all-party blanket primary, did not advance to general	
2022	Luis J. Rodriguez	Governor	124,672	1.8%	Lost	all-party blanket primary, did not advance to general; Green Party candidate endorsed by PFP	
2018	Gloria La Riva	Governor	16,959	0.3%	Lost	all-party blanket primary, did not advance to general	
2018	Gayle McLaughlin	Lieutenant Governor	263,364	4.0%	Lost	ran as No Party Preference (NPP) candidate; founder of Richmond Progressive Alliance (RPA); endorsed by CNP, DSA, GPCA, OR, PFP, PP, and RPA	
2014	Cindy Sheehan	Governor	52,707	1.2%	Lost	all-party blanket primary, did not advance to general	
2010	Carlos Alvarez	Governor	92,637	0.9%	Lost		
2006	Janice Jordan	Governor	69,934	0.8%	Lost		
2003	C. T. Weber	Governor	1,626	0.02%	Lost		
1998	Gloria La Riva	Governor	59,218	0.7%	Lost		
1994	Gloria La Riva	Governor	72,774	0.9%	Lost		
1990	Maria Elizabeth Muñoz	Governor	88,707	1.3%	Lost		
1986	Maria Elizabeth Muñoz	Governor	51,995	1.0%	Lost		
1982	Elizabeth Martínez	Governor	70,327	0.9%	Lost		
1978	Marilyn Seals	Governor	70,864	1.0%	Lost		
1974	Elizabeth Keathley	Governor	75,004	1.2%	Lost	supported by California Libertarian Alliance	
1970	Ricardo Romo	Governor	65,954	1.0%	Lost	joined Raza Unida Party after election	

== Party conventions ==
Name	Date	Location	Documents	Notes
2024 State Convention	August 3, 2024	Sacramento		
2022 State Convention				
2020 State Convention	August 2020			
2018 State Convention	August 11–12, 2018	Sacramento		
2016 State Convention	August 13–14, 2016	Sacramento		
2014 State Convention	August 10, 2014			
2012 State Convention	August 2012			
2010 State Convention	August 1, 2010	Sacramento	Resolution on State Worker Contracts	rare instance of convention passing a resolution
2008 State Convention	August 2–3, 2008	Sacramento		
1996 State Convention				
1992 State Convention				
1988 State Convention		Sacramento		convention split without selecting a candidate
1974 State Convention		Sacramento		libertarians split from convention
1971 National Convention				
1968 National Convention	August 17–18, 1968	Ann Arbor, Michigan		first national convention
Founding Convention	March 16–18, 1968	Richmond, CA		founding convention

== See also ==
- American Left
- Socialist Party of America
- History of the socialist movement in the United States
- California Libertarian Alliance
