= J. C. Penney Co. Warehouse Building (St. Louis, Missouri) =

- J.C. Penney Co. Warehouse Building
- U.S. National Register of Historic Places
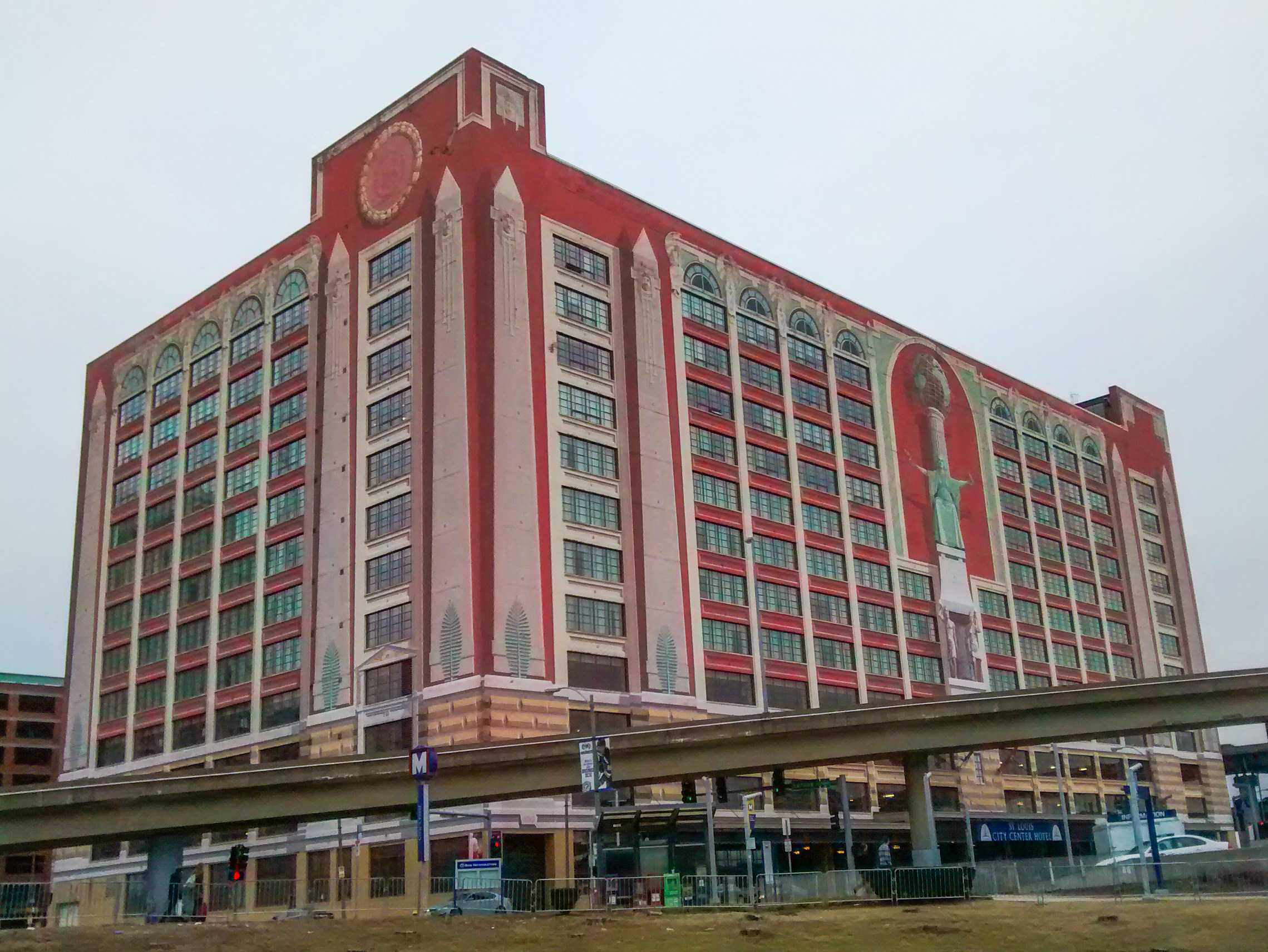

- Location within St. Louis Location within Missouri Location within the United States
- Location: 400 S. 14th St., St. Louis, Missouri
- Coordinates: 38°37′27″N 90°12′7″W
- Area: 1.7 acres (0.69 ha)
- Built: 1928-1929
- Architect: Miller, John F.; Starrett Bros.
- NRHP reference No.: 98001563
- Added to NRHP: December 31, 1998

The J. C. Penney Co. Warehouse Building, formerly also known as Edison Brothers Warehouse Building, and now Edison Condominiums, is a historic warehouse building in downtown St. Louis, Missouri. The building now serves as a condo-hotel.

== History ==
The building was constructed in 1929 as a warehouse for the J.C. Penney retail chain. It occupied the building until 1954, after which it was donated to the University of Missouri as a location for an education center, which never materialized. In 1967, the university leased the warehouse to Edison Brothers Stores, which used it as a warehouse for its retail operations until 1994. In 1983, the company commissioned muralist Richard Haas to paint a trompe-l'œil mural on three sides of the building that mimicked architectural stonework, using themes derived from the 1904 St. Louis World's Fair.

The building reopened in 2001 after a $54 million renovation as a combination of condominiums and the Sheraton St. Louis City Center hotel. The hotel left Sheraton in 2014 and was unbranded until 2018, when it became a Red Lion Hotel. It closed in 2020, due to the COVID-19 pandemic and reopened in 2022 as an OYO Hotel. It is set to be renovated, at a cost of $46 million, and will regain its Sheraton flag.
