= Mohonk Preserve =

Nature preserve in New York State

Coordinates: 41°44′50″N 74°12′35″W

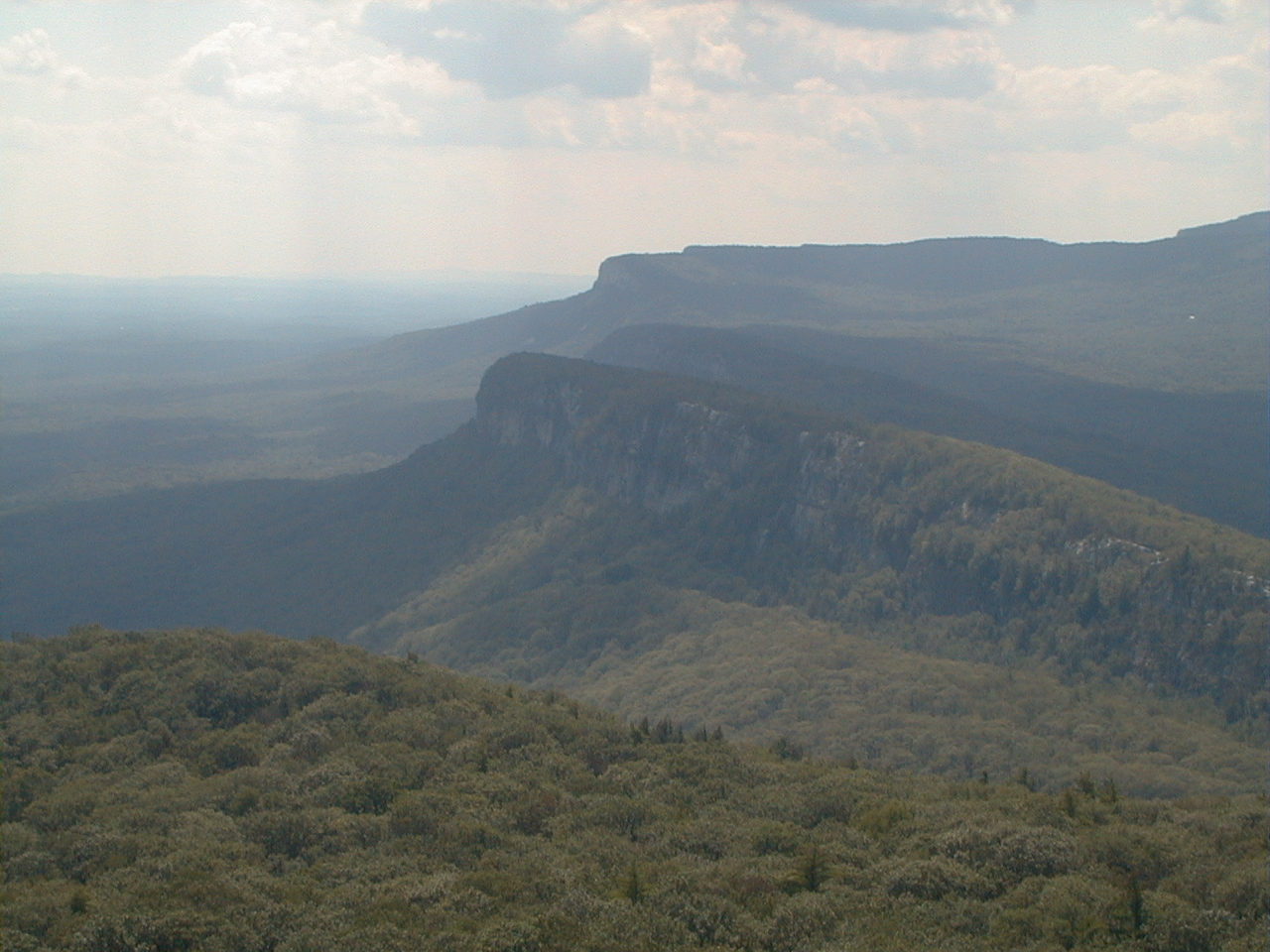
The Trapps in the Mohonk Preserve

The Mohonk Preserve is a nature preserve in the Shawangunk Ridge, 90 miles (140 km) north of New York City in Ulster County, New York. The preserve has over 8,200 acres (33 km^{2}) of cliffs, forests, fields, ponds and streams, with over 70 miles (110 km) of carriage roads and 40 miles (64 km) of trails for hiking, cycling, trail running, cross-country skiing, snowshoeing, and horseback riding. It is also a major destination for rock climbers, hosting 50,000 climbers each year who enjoy more than 1,000 climbing routes.

== History ==
The origins of the preserve date to 1869, when twin brothers Albert and Alfred Smiley purchased Lake Mohonk and established the Mohonk Mountain House. On February 26, 1963, the Smiley family, friends, neighbors and supporters formed the Mohonk Trust to protect the area's unique natural landscape for future generations. The property of the Mohonk Trust on that day in 1963 consisted of $100, a gift from Mabel Craven Smiley. Land was acquired by the Mohonk Trust over the years, and it became the Mohonk Preserve Inc. in 1978. According to their 2017 IRS Form 990 their assets then exceeded $25 million. Through the support of members, donors and partners, the preserve has become a center for outdoor education and a conservation advocate, especially for natural lands in the Shawangunks and the Hudson Valley. Its mission includes land protection and stewardship, sponsorship of environmental education programs, which according to Preserve officials have served more than 100,000 children over a thirty-year period, and maintenance of biological, weather, and natural history records spanning more than a century.

In 1986, the Mohonk Preserve and Mohonk Mountain House together were designated a National Historic Landmark.

The name "Moggonck" appeared in early boundary records referring to the "high hill", the crag now named Skytop where the Skytop Tower is located. The spelling change from "gg" to "h" was probably done for aesthetic reasons. The word Moggonck was possibly derived from the Lenape maxkwung, "place of bears", or from the Munsee maxkawenge, "hill of bears". Another possibility comes from the related Mohican language, in which Magunk is derived from Magki, "great", and Unk, "a standing tree".

== Description ==
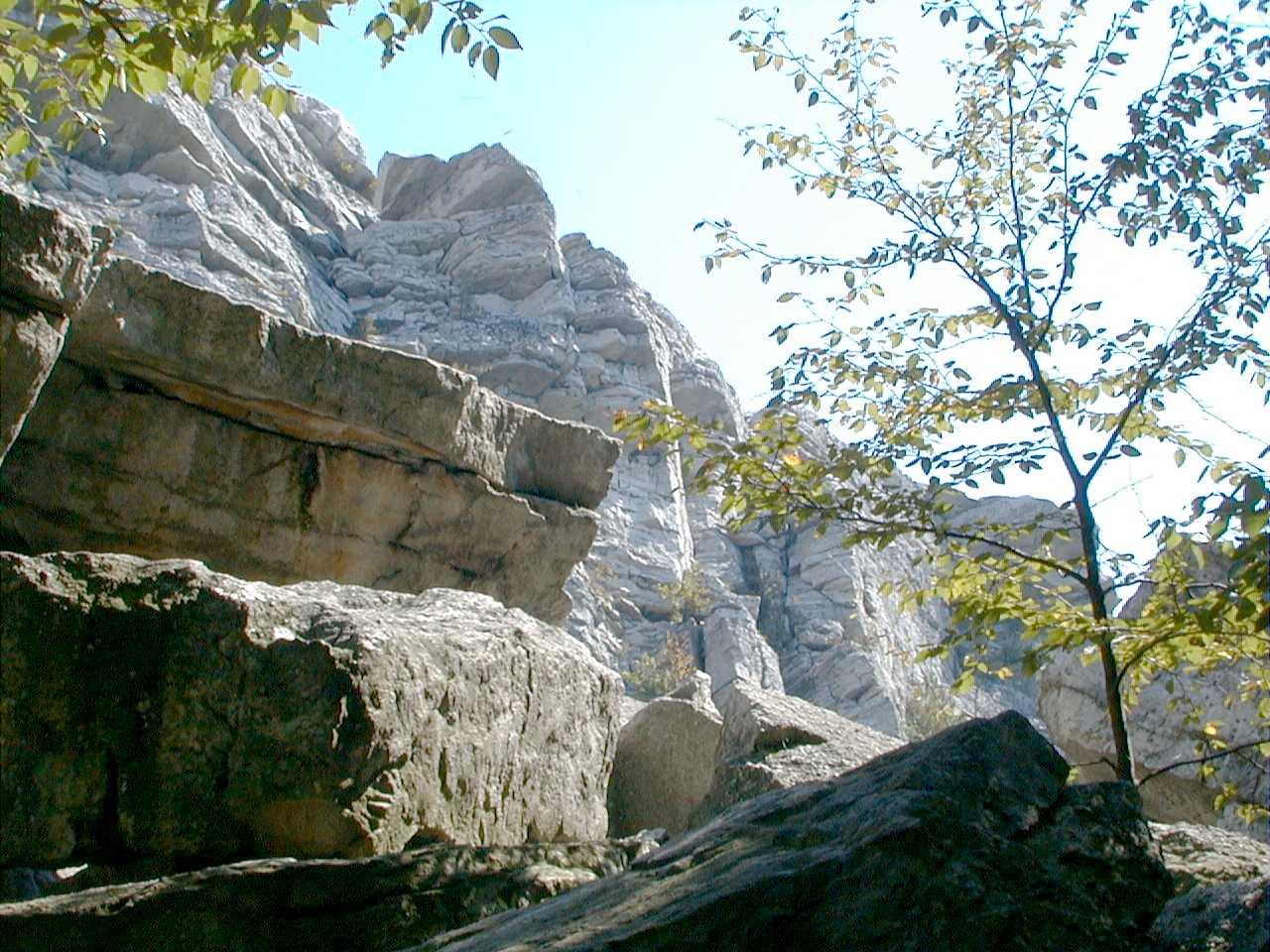
Bonticou Crag in the Mohonk Preserve

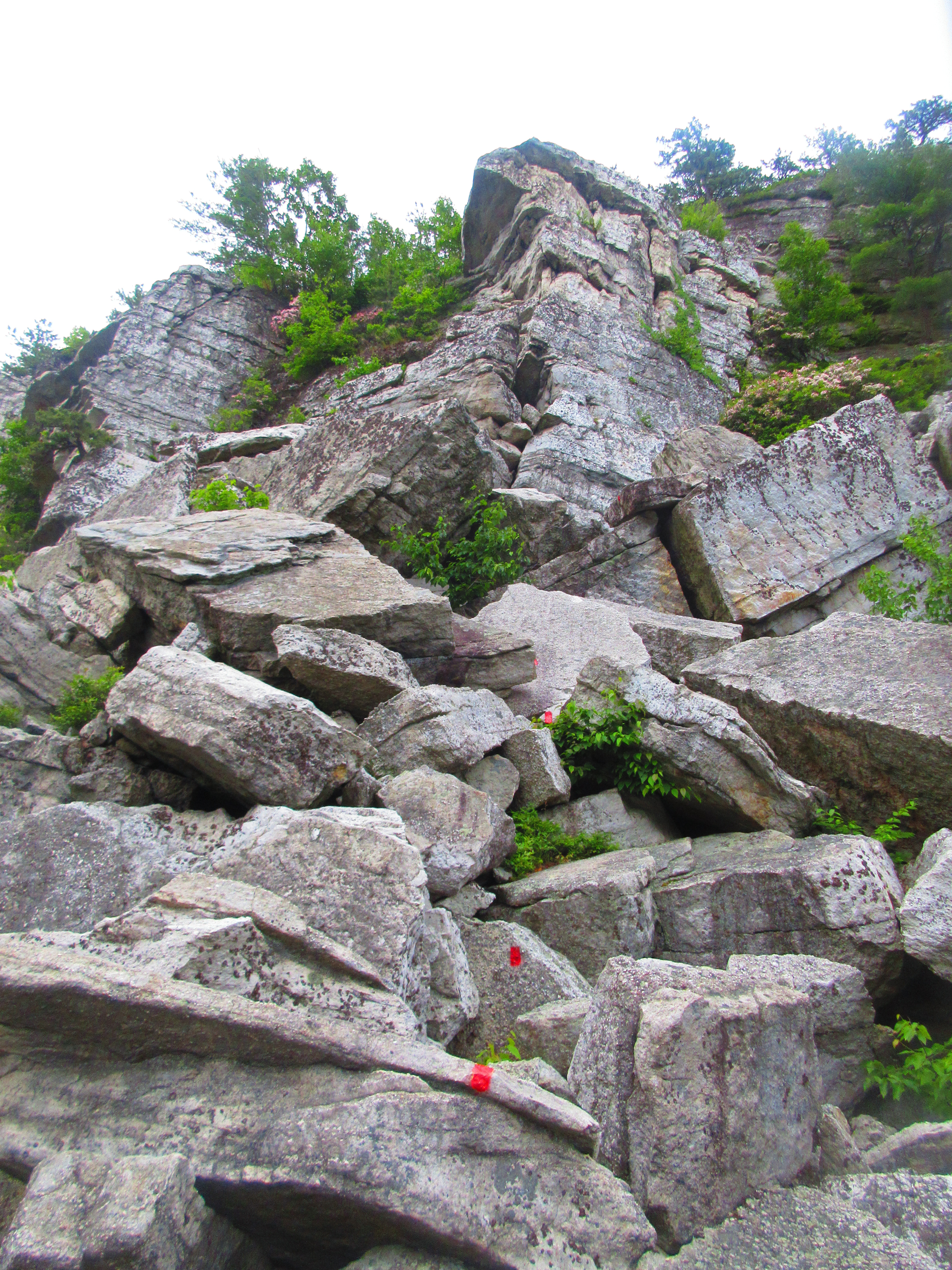
Rock scramble at Bonticou Crag

Headquarters of the not-for-profit Mohonk Preserve are in Gardiner, New York. Most of the land is in the town of Gardiner, but there is also land in the towns of Marbletown, Rosendale, New Paltz, and Rochester. Preserve lands extend for nearly 8 miles (13 km) from Rosendale to Millbrook Mountain.

More than 75% of the Preserve's funding comes from contributions, memberships and investments. Grants from land conservation organizations, including some from the New York State Conservation Partnership Program, and funds from the state's Environmental Protection Fund amount to 23% of income. It was the first land trust established on the northern Shawangunk Ridge.

The Preserve's mission is to protect the Shawangunk Mountains by inspiring people to care for, enjoy, and explore the natural world. To accomplish its mission, the Preserve conducts programs in four key areas - environmental education, serving both school children and adults; land protection, saving high-priority land on the ridge; land stewardship, balancing the protection of land and wildlife with opportunities for recreation; and scientific research, creating a "living laboratory" on the land. The land is home to more than 1,400 plant and animal species, including the peregrine falcon, Jefferson salamander, and 2,000 acres (810 ha) of rare dwarf pitch pine. Restricted deer hunting is allowed with the aim of preventing ecological damage due to overbrowsing.

There is a per-person day fee for cycling and rock climbing. Annual memberships are available. Free one-month memberships were offered to Ulster County residents in the spring and again in the fall of 2014. Hours of operation are from sunrise to one hour past sunset.

Minnewaska State Park Preserve adjoins the Mohonk Preserve lands to the south, and protects another 12,000 acres (49 km^{2}) of former property of another member of the Smiley family as a state park.

== Daniel Smiley Research Center ==
The Daniel Smiley Research Center (DSRC) is the Mohonk Preserve's conservation science unit. The DSRC archive is recognized nationally for an extensive collection of biodiversity and natural history long-term research data. The archive includes more than 86 years of natural and cultural history observations, over 120 years of daily weather data, 60,000 physical items, 9,000 photographs, and research library. Of those physical items, there are over 3,000 herbarium specimens, 139 mammal specimens, 107 bird specimens, 140 butterfly specimens, 400 arthropod specimens, and over 10,000 index cards with handwritten and/or typed natural history observations. The collections are also frequently cited in research on climate change, biodiversity, bird migration, and human impact on the environment.
