= Ephriam DuPuy Stone House =

Historic house in New York, United States

- U.S. National Register of Historic Places
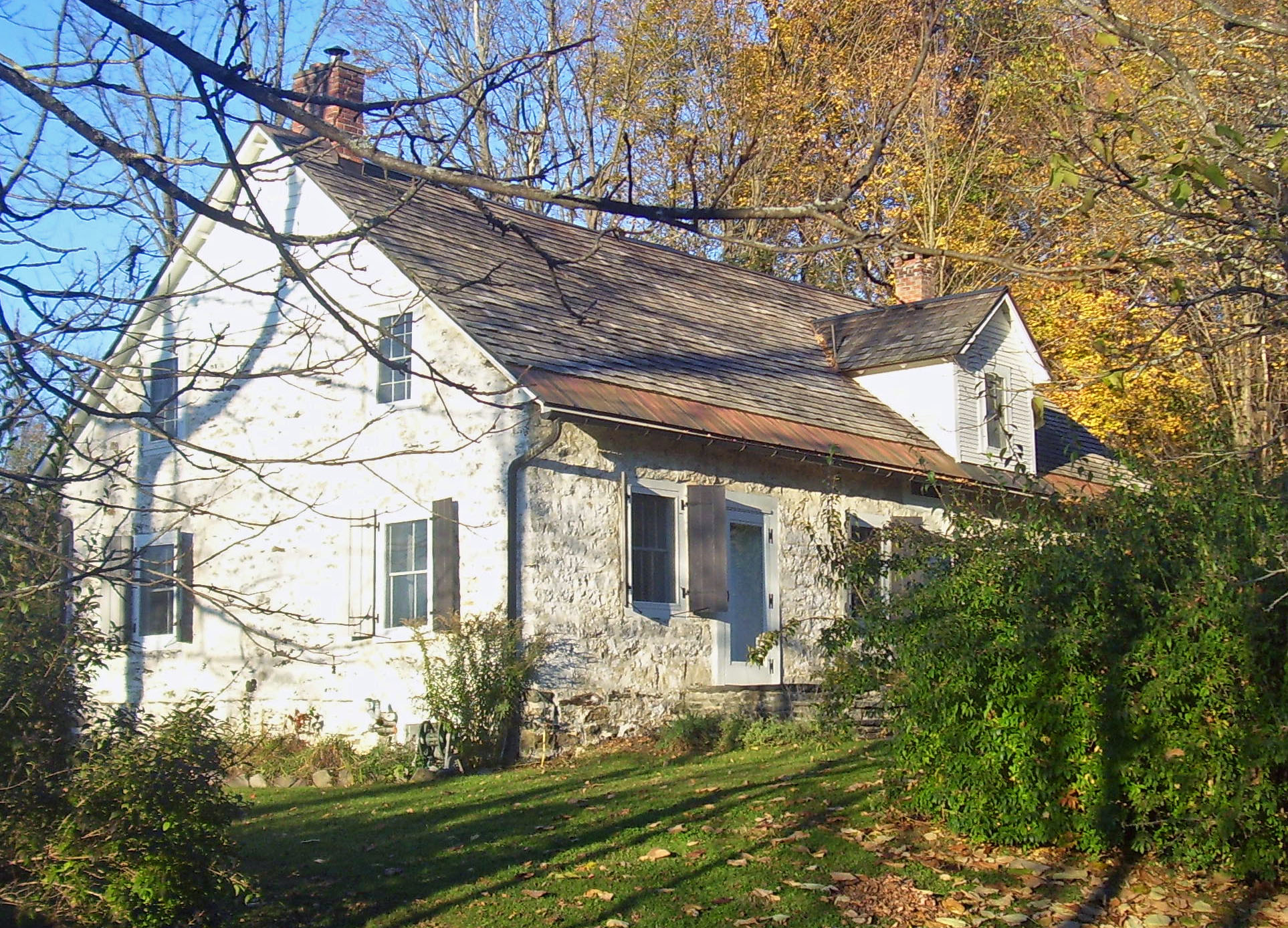
- West profile and south elevation, 2008

- Location within New York Location within the United States
- Location: Kerhonkson, NY
- Coordinates: 41°49′10″N 74°13′16″W
- Area: 2 acres (8,100 m^{2})
- Built: 1750
- MPS: Rochester MPS
- NRHP reference No.: 95000952
- Added to NRHP: August 10, 1995

The Ephriam DuPuy Stone House is located on Whitfield Road near the hamlet of Kerhonkson, New York, United States, in the Ulster County town of Rochester. It was built in the mid-18th century.

It has been very well preserved since the time of its construction. In 1995 it and a wellhouse on the property were listed on the National Register of Historic Places.

== Buildings and grounds ==
The house is located on a trapezoidal 2-acre (8,100 m^{2}) parcel on the northeast section of the junction of Airport and Whitfield roads two miles north of the US 209 highway. It is mostly wooded, with nearby areas cleared and used as fields. Three other stone houses listed on the Register, the Middaugh, Krom and Hornbeck houses to the north, east and south respectively. There are two outbuildings, a non-contributing modern garage across Whitfield Road and a contributing wellhouse on the parcel.

The main house is a one-and-a-half-story linear stone building with gabled roof pierced by two brick chimneys at the ends and a gabled dormer window in the center of each side. It is shingled in asphalt on the south with the original standing seam metal remaining on the north. The gable peaks are sided in clapboard and the rest of the house has remaining whitewash. A vertical seam in the middle of the south (rear) facade, the side of the house most visible from the nearby road, is the result of the house's construction in two segments.

Entrances to either elevation are located off-center, to the east on the north and the west on the south. All windows on the ground floor are two-over-two double-hung sash, with louvered shutters. The upper windows are smaller six-over six, paired on the west and single on the east. The dormers are similarly treated. They light a centrally located stair inside that divides two large rooms.

The wellhouse is a small frame building topped with a gable roof. It is sided in flushboard. Paired louvered panels divided by a central mullion shelter the well.

== History ==
Earlier accounts suggest the home was built in 1730, the year Ephriam DuPuy was born. It is more likely that it was built 20 years later when he married. His father's will leave him the house and barn "already in his possession". Ephriam served as a first lieutenant in the Third Ulster Regiment during the Revolutionary War.

At the time of its construction, in separate halves, the front of the house faced south. Later renovations turned that around. The wellhouse was built in 1890, the garage in the early 20th century. There have been no other significant changes to the property since then.

== See also ==
- National Register of Historic Places listings in Ulster County, New York
