= Middaugh =

Middaugh is a surname. Notable people with the surname include:

- Bud Middaugh (born c. 1939), American baseball coach
- Sherry Middaugh (born 1966), Canadian curler
- Tuesday Middaugh (born 1973), American synchronized swimmer
- Wayne Middaugh (born 1967), Canadian curler

== See also ==
- Henry C. Middaugh House
- Middaugh-Stone House and Dutch Barn
