= Dirck Westbrook Stone House =

Historic house in New York, United States

- U.S. National Register of Historic Places
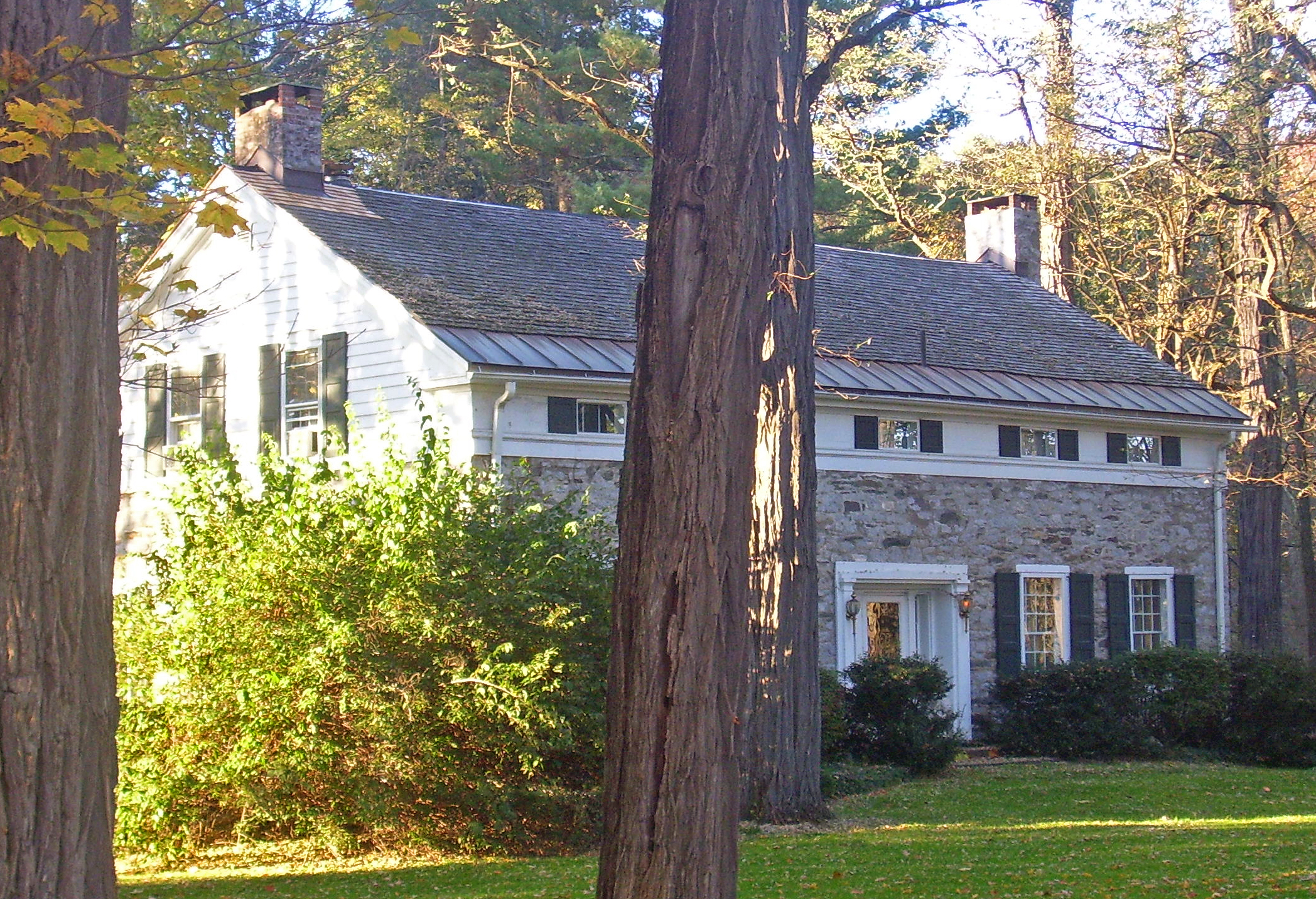
- West profile and south elevation, 2008

- Location within New York Location within the United States
- Location: Kerhonkson, NY
- Nearest city: Kingston
- Coordinates: 41°48′22″N 74°13′15″W
- Area: 5 acres (2.0 ha)
- Built: c. 1709
- MPS: Rochester MPS
- NRHP reference No.: 95000949
- Added to NRHP: August 10, 1995

The Dirck Westbrook Stone House is located on Old Whitfield Road near the hamlet of Kerhonkson in the Town of Rochester, New York, United States. It is a stone structure that dates in part to the early 18th century.

A century after it was built, a larger Greek Revival front was added. The property has otherwise remained intact. In 1999 it and some accompanying outbuildings were listed on the National Register of Historic Places.

== Buildings and grounds ==
The house and its outbuildings are located on a triangular 5 acres (2.0 ha) lot between Old Whitfield and Whitfield roads roughly one mile (1.6 km) north of the US 209 highway. Canyon Lake Road leaves to the east opposite the property's driveway and crosses the North Peterskill, a subtributary of Rondout Creek. The lot is planted with mature trees, particularly locusts in front of the house. The surrounding area is generally rural, consisting of either fields or woodlots.

There are five resources on the lot. In addition to the house there are two other buildings, a garage and caretakers' house. Both are modern and not considered as contributing to its historic character. A smokehouse, privy and state historical marker are considered contributing.

The main house itself is a two-story five-bay main block of rubblestone with clapboard siding above the first story. It is topped with a gabled roof shingled in asphalt over the original metal and pierced by two stone chimneys. A one-and-a-half-story wing with similar treatment, the original house, projects northward from the north (rear) facade, pierced by a central chimney. Next to it is a modern enclosed frame porch.

On the south (front) elevation, the main entrance is flanked by double-hung nine-over-nine sash windows with wooden shutters. Above them are eyebrow windows set in the frieze. The main entrance is framed by a wooden surround. In the rear the porch is topped with a segmental arched dormer window. The kitchen wing has a sash window similar to those on the main house's attic set in a central shallow-pitched dormer with overhanging eaves and a flat soffit. The ground floor windows on that wing have slightly pedimented lintels.

Behind the house is a modern garage at the end of the drive. To its north are the smokehouse and gable-roofed privy. The caretaker's house is at the south corner of the property, near the 1920s-era state historical marker.

== History ==
Dirck Westbrook's is associated with the property from at least 1709, when the local town trustees granted him the land between the house and Mettacahonts Creek to the north. It is believed that he had established himself in the town earlier than that, around 1700. The front block was added in the early 19th century, a common practice at that time.

== See also ==
- National Register of Historic Places listings in Ulster County, New York
