= J. Dupuy Stone House =

Historic house in New York, United States

- U.S. National Register of Historic Places
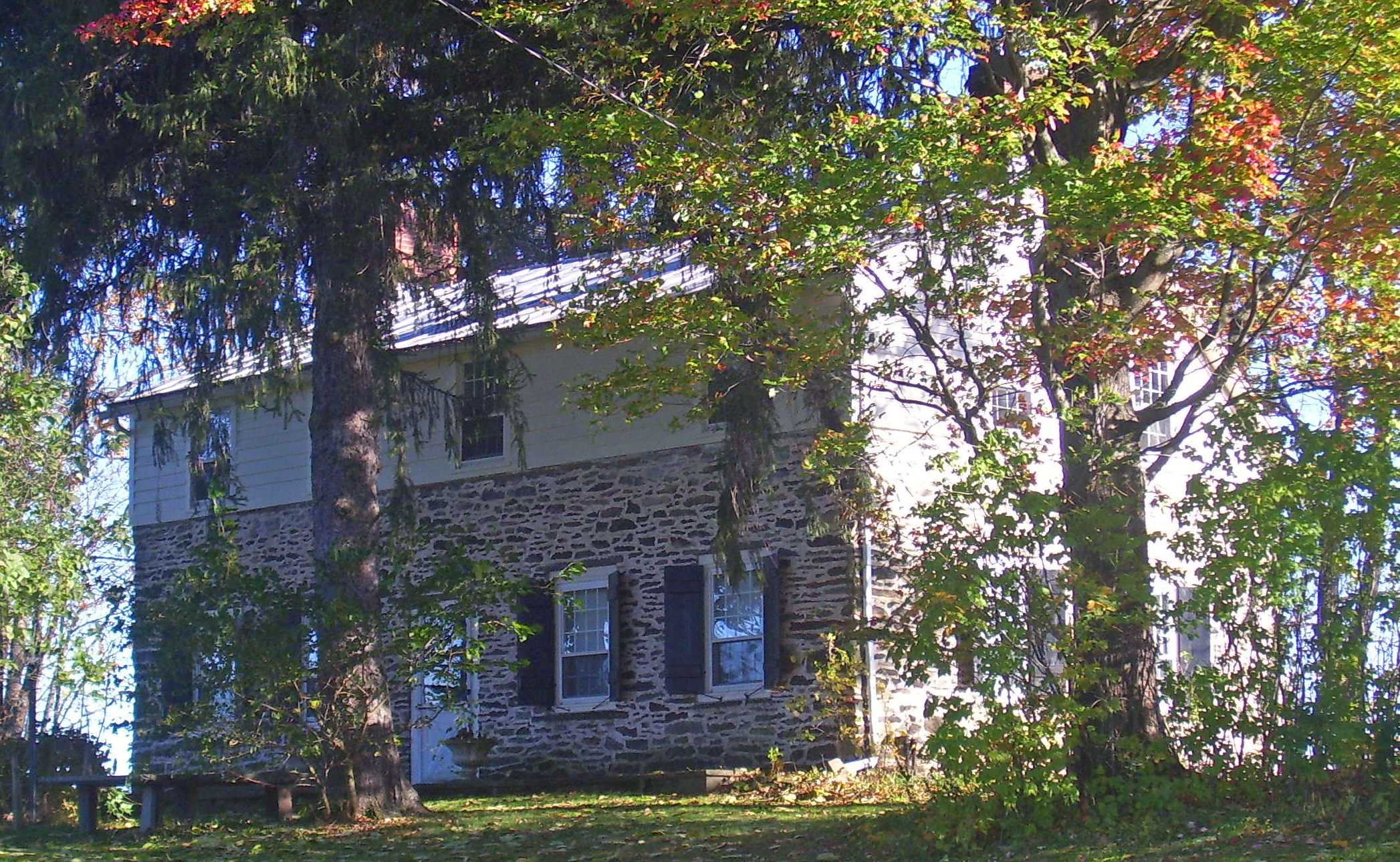
- North elevation and west profile, 2008

- Location within New York Location within the United States
- Location: Kerhonkson, NY
- Coordinates: 41°48′9″N 74°16′43″W
- Area: 2.5 acres (1.0 ha)
- Built: 1840
- MPS: Rochester MPS
- NRHP reference No.: 97000110
- Added to NRHP: February 21, 1997

The J. Dupuy Stone House is located on Krum Road near Kerhonkson, New York, United States, in the Ulster County town of Rochester. It was built in the mid-19th century and modified later.

On the property are several other outbuildings, including a stand-alone smokehouse. They and the house were listed on National Register of Historic Places in 1997.

== Buildings and grounds ==
The 2.5-acre (1.0 ha) lot with the house and outbuildings is located on the south side of Krum Road half a mile east of its eastern end at Queens Highway. The house is surrounded by mature spruce and maple trees, the only such growth in a large area of open fields. The terrain is generally level, providing views of the Catskill foothills to the west and the Shawangunk Ridge to the east.

The house itself is a five-bay one-and-a-half-story stone building with clapboard siding on the upper half-story. It is topped with a standing-seam metal gabled roof pierced by brick chimneys at either end. On the south (rear) side is a two-bay, two-story clapboard-sided wing added later.

Fenestration is regular. All first-story windows are modern vinyl replacements for the originals. Those on the first story have louvered wooden shutters. Those on the upper story of the north (front) facade skip bays. A small wooden deck is located in front of the main entrance, running almost the width of the house.

A stone walk leads from the front door to the road; at the latter's former route there are two stone posts and a six-foot (2 m) square bluestone mounting block, a contributing object to the National Register listing. On the east of the driveway there is a rectangular one-story frame clapboard-sided shed with corrugated metal gable roof and a one-story shed-roofed addition. It has a wooden sliding door on thewest and a board-and-batten strap-hinged door on the east. Behind it and the house, to the southeast, is the smokehouse, a single-story front-gabled rubblestone building with a plank front door.

== History ==
The house was originally built around 1840 in the classic linear form of many stone houses of that era. The smokehouse is one of only six extant in the town of Rochester. In the early 20th century the front was raised to a full story, the only stone house in town where this was done. In the later years of that century, the hip roofed front porch was removed. There have been no other major alterations to the house.

== See also ==
- National Register of Historic Places listings in Ulster County, New York
