= C. K. Schoonmaker Stone House =

Historic house in New York, United States

- U.S. National Register of Historic Places
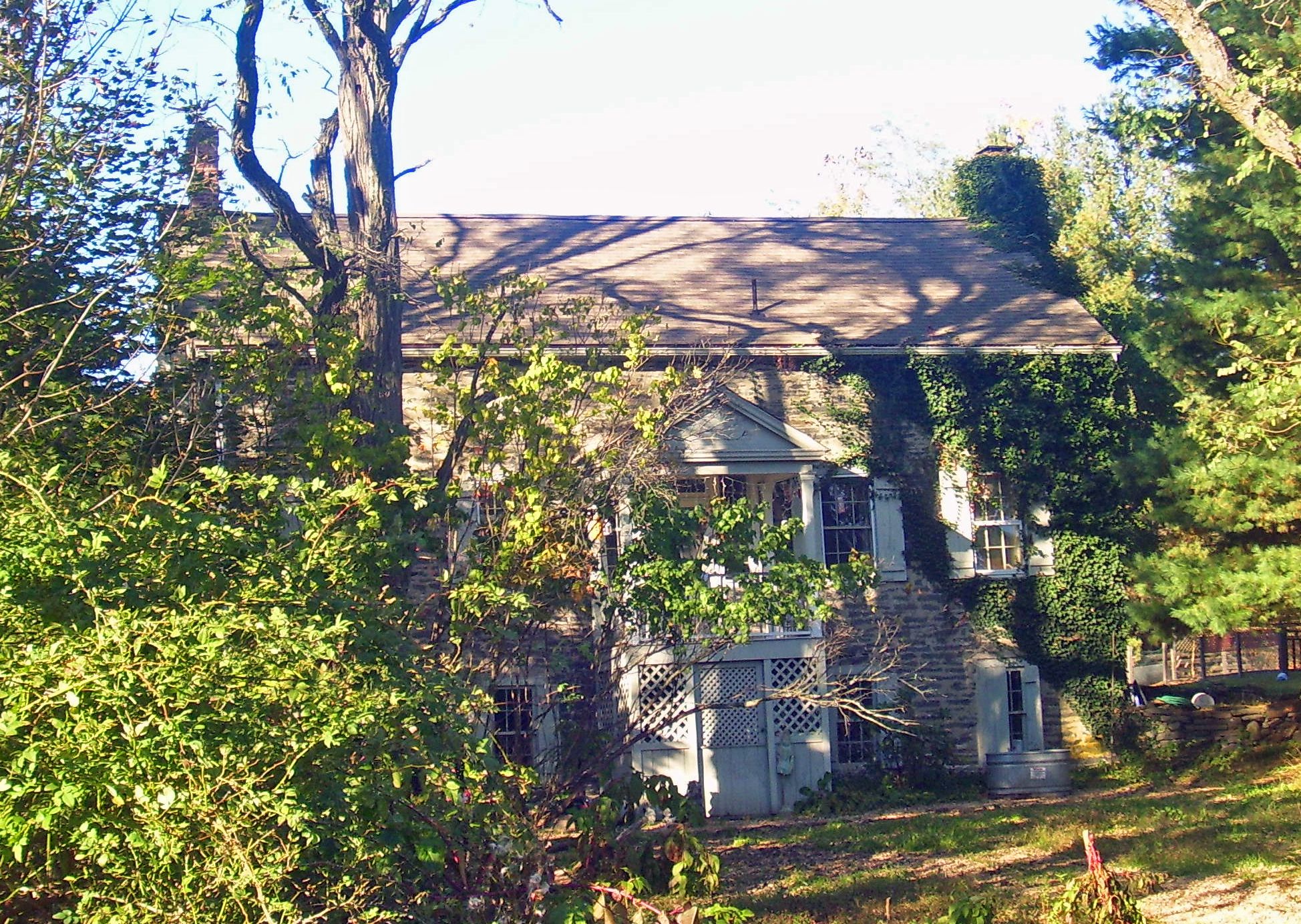
- South elevation, 2008

- Location within New York Location within the United States
- Location: Kerhonkson, NY
- Nearest city: Kingston
- Coordinates: 41°48′33″N 74°16′11″W
- Area: 2 acres (8,100 m^{2})
- Built: 1840
- MPS: Rochester MPS
- NRHP reference No.: 97000107
- Added to NRHP: February 21, 1997

The C. K. Schoonmaker Stone House is located on Queens Highway near the hamlet of Kerhonkson, New York, United States, in the Ulster County town of Rochester. It is a stone bank house erected in the early 19th century.

It has remained mostly intact from the time of its construction. In 1997 it was listed on the National Register of Historic Places.

== Building ==
The house is on a 2 acres (8,100 m^{2}) lot on the east side of Queens Highway, approximately 1.5 miles (2.4 km) north of highway US 209. The area is rural, a combination of woodlots and small fields. The lot is mostly wooded, with many mature locust trees and shrubbery partially screening the house from the road. The foundation of an old barn is located to the east.

The house itself is a two-story five-bay stone structure built into a rise in the land so that its basement is exposed on the south (front) side. It is topped by a gabled roof pierced by brick chimneys at either end. A three-quarter-width shed-roofed two-story frame addition is on the west. Ivy covers the south end of the front facade and that side's chimney. All windows have board-and-batten shutters.

A centrally located two-story wooden porch shelters the main entrance on the basement level behind vertical wainscot and diagonal latticework. Above it is a balustraded balcony whose gabled roof is supported by square pillars. At the rear, a corresponding entrance on the upper floor is complemented by a full-length patio. Next to the wing on the west is a basement door sheltered by a cantilevered porch. On the rear elevation a shed-roofed dormer window surmounts the main entrance.

The main entrance, with sidelights and a transom, opens onto an interior with a central hall plan on both floors. Both the modern and historic kitchen, with the remains of a beehive oven, are on the first floor. Many rooms retain original finishes, such as the wall plaster, wide board flooring and exposed ceiling beams, along with some original molding.

== History ==
The house was built in the early 19th century, a variant on the linear model of stone houses popular at the time. It was called a bank house since it was built into a rise in the earth, like a few others in the town. At some point in the late 20th century the shed-roofed dormer window over the main entrance was removed. There have been no other major changes to the house.

== See also ==
- National Register of Historic Places listings in Ulster County, New York
