= Clarendon Hills Historical Society =

Coordinates: 41.790467°N 87.947683°W

The Clarendon Hills Historical Society is a volunteer-run organization in Clarendon Hills, Illinois, tasked with retaining the town's history and establishing a community center for town residents to use as a gather place, as well as a museum to display prominent artifacts pertaining to the history of the village.

== History ==
The Clarendon Hills Historical Society was founded in 1974 by members of a local group known as the Friends of the Library. Until the official establishment of the Clarendon Hills Historical Society, the village's historical artifacts and archival materials had been stored, and cared for, at the Clarendon Hills Library, another volunteer-run village institution. This is the reason for the progression of the Friends of the Library group towards an established historical society. During its initial years of operation the Clarendon Hills Historical Society had a small, but valuable, collection of newspapers, books, photographs, and personal artifacts of village residents.

== Middaugh Mansion Demolition ==
The Middaugh Mansion, a 19th-century mansion built by one of Clarendon Hills' founding members, and one of Clarendon Hills' largest and most prominent buildings on the National Register of Historic Places, was slated to be demolished in 2002. The Middaugh Mansion Foundation was formed by local residents to focus its efforts on saving the mansion from demolition. When it became clear that the historic mansion could not be saved from demolition, the Clarendon Hills Historical Society and the Middaugh Mansion Foundation, along with help and support from the village, shifted its focus to saving and preserving a large number of artifacts from the mansion, including stairway banisters, hand-crafted wood doors, cabinets, fireplace mantels, kitchen and bath appliances and furniture, hand-crafted stained glass windows, and various other items from the building.

== Heritage Hall ==
Heritage Hall is the planned renovation of a village 1930s water pump house which will house both a community center and the Clarendon Hills Historical Society as well as a small museum.

With the demolition of the Middaugh Mansion, representatives from the Village of Clarendon Hills, the Middaugh Mansion Foundation, the Clarendon Hills Historical Society, and interested residents formed a committee to care for the artifacts which were recovered from the Middaugh Mansion. Since then, the committee has evolved into the Heritage Hall Committee, a village-sponsored committee whose goal is to establish an operating facility for the Clarendon Hills Historical Society in which the artifacts from the Middaugh Mansion will be displayed or structurally incorporated into the building.

The Heritage Hall Committee, together with the Clarendon Hills Historical Society, leased an historic 1930s water pump house from the Village of Clarendon Hills for 99 years. Although in its early stages, the renovation for the pump house into a modern community facility is under way, and initial fundraising efforts have proved to be successful, and definitive architectural design plans have been created and bid on. There is currently no opening date for the new Heritage Hall.

== Governing body ==
The Clarendon Hills Historical Society is a membership-based organization where members pay yearly dues in return for invitations to exclusive events, special program opportunities, and a regular newsletter. Currently, the Society has a board of directors led by four officers: an elected president, vice-president, secretary, and treasurer. Presidential terms are two years, and directors are appointed by the officers.
