= Paul Austin Kelly =

American singer (born 1960)

Paul Austin Kelly (born 1960) is an American singer. A former rock musician who has sung opera, the tenor also writes, records and performs music for children.

== Musical beginnings ==
Kelly attended Rondout Valley High School in Accord, New York, and the Hartt School of Music in West Hartford, Connecticut. When he began his music career he fronted bands with names such as Legend, Black Dog and Guilded Spice. Kelly sang an eclectic mix of rock, pop music, folk and jazz. It wasn't until he went to music school that the operatic potential of his voice was discovered.

== Opera performances ==
Kelly has sung with the Metropolitan Opera, the Royal Opera at Covent Garden, and La Scala in Milan, Italy. The role of Count Almaviva in Rossini's The Barber of Seville has become his signature role.

Kelly has also made numerous live performances on BBC Radio.

== Recording ==
Kelly is an artist on the Opera Rara music label, the Telarc label and the Decca label.

In 2003 he launched the Walking Oliver children's music label. The label won the National Parenting Publications Award (NAPPA) in the children's music category for the CD Hello Michael Rosen. The recording featured the poetry of children's literature icon Michael Rosen set to original music by Kelly. On the Walking Oliver CD titled Dreams, Kelly provided music and vocals for poems composed by primary school children from across the UK who had been chosen as winners of the first Walking Oliver Poetry in Song Contest.

In 2008 Kelly recorded the CD "The Song Is You" with British jazz pianist and producer Kenny Clayton. The CD contains popular music from the Great American Songbook by such composers as Rodgers and Hart, Jerome Kern and Oscar Hammerstein II.

In 2009 Kelly recorded "Where Did The Dinosaurs Go?" a CD recorded on the Walking Oliver label. The CD won an iParenting Media Award for Outstanding Audio.

== Personal life ==
Kelly lives in Lewes in southern England. It was while performing with the nearby Glyndebourne Opera early in his career that he became enamored of the local area and decided to settle there with his wife, Carol. He still returns to his native country.
