= Flight 529 =

Flight 529 may refer to:

- TWA Flight 529 (1961)
- Atlantic Southeast Airlines Flight 529 (1995)
