= Kerhonkson Synagogue =

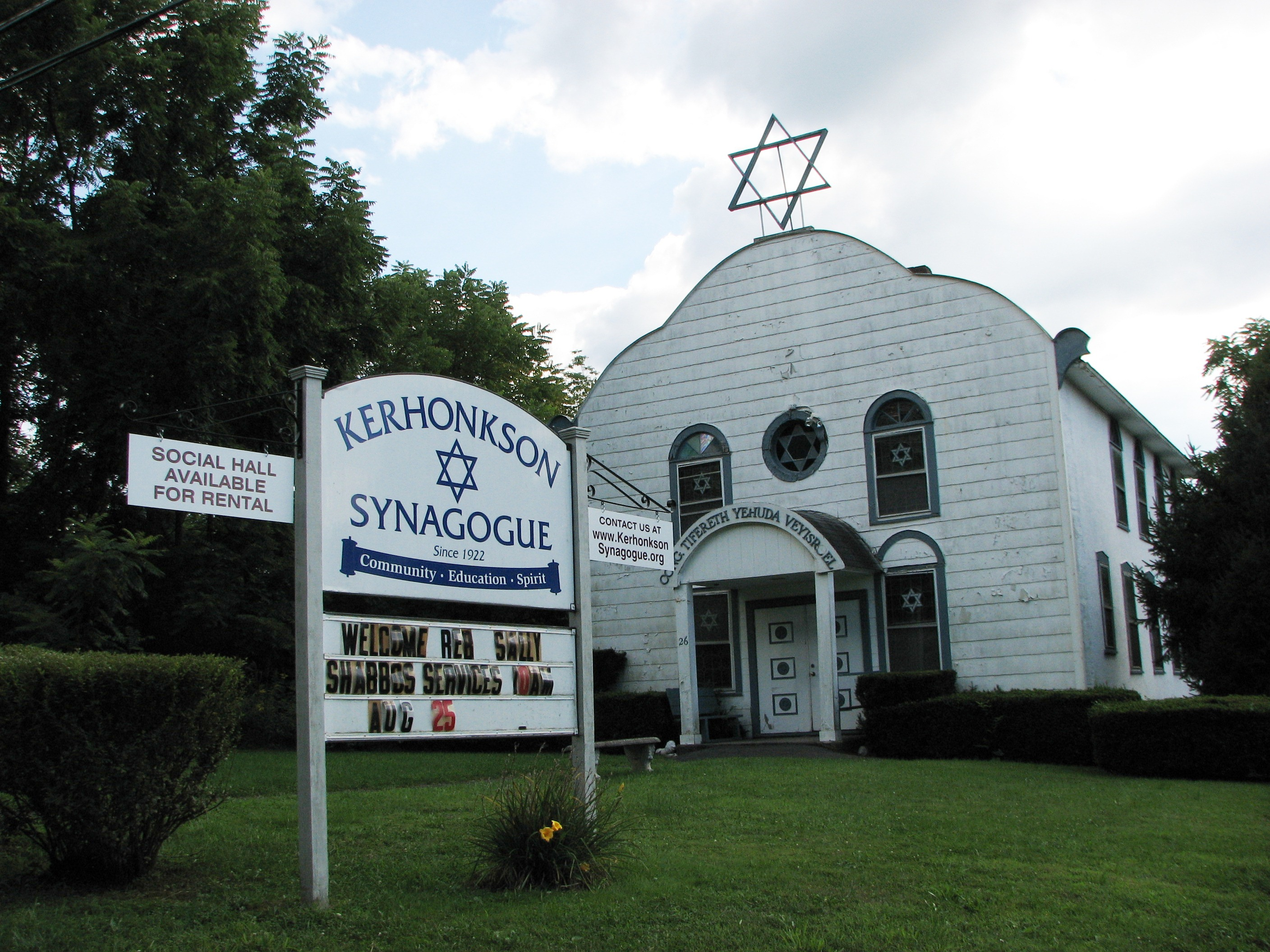
- The Kerhonkson synagogue, in 2012

- Location in New York

Religion
- Affiliation: Judaism
- Rite: Post-denominational
- Ecclesiastical or organisational status: Synagogue
- Leadership: Rabbi Sally Shore-Wittenberg
- Status: Active

Location
- Location: 26 Minnewaska Trail, Kerhonkson, Ulster County, New York 12446
- Country: United States
- Coordinates: 41°46′14″N 74°17′52″W

Architecture
- Established: 1922 (as a congregation)
- Completed: 1924; c. 1954
- Materials: Wooden frame; stucco

Website
- kerhonksonsynagogue.org
- Congregation Tifereth Yehuda Veyisroel
- U.S. National Register of Historic Places
- Area: Less than 1 acre (0.40 ha)
- NRHP reference No.: 13000632
- Added to NRHP: August 27, 2013

Kerhonkson Synagogue, officially Congregation Tifereth Yehuda VeYisroel, is a post-denominational Jewish congregation and historic synagogue located at 26 Minnewaska Trail, Kerhonkson, in Ulster County, New York, in the United States.

The congregation was founded as an Orthodox congregation in 1922 by local Jewish farmers.

The synagogue was built in 1924, and is a one-story, rectangular, wood-frame building with a gable roof with overhanging eaves. It sits on a concrete covered stone basement and is clad in stucco on three sides. The façade has a false front that extends above the roof with three curves surmounted by a Star of David.. It was built to serve Jewish merchants and farmers in the Kerhonkson area and is one of 20 intact early 20th-century Catskill synagogues.

Also on the property is the contributing Community House (c. 1954).

The synagogue building was listed on the National Register of Historic Places in 2013.

== Additional reading ==
- Bluming, H. Charles (2000). Jew Boy in Goy Town: A Catskill Mountain Odyssey. n.p.
