= Appeldoorn Farm =

- U.S. National Register of Historic Places
- U.S. Historic district
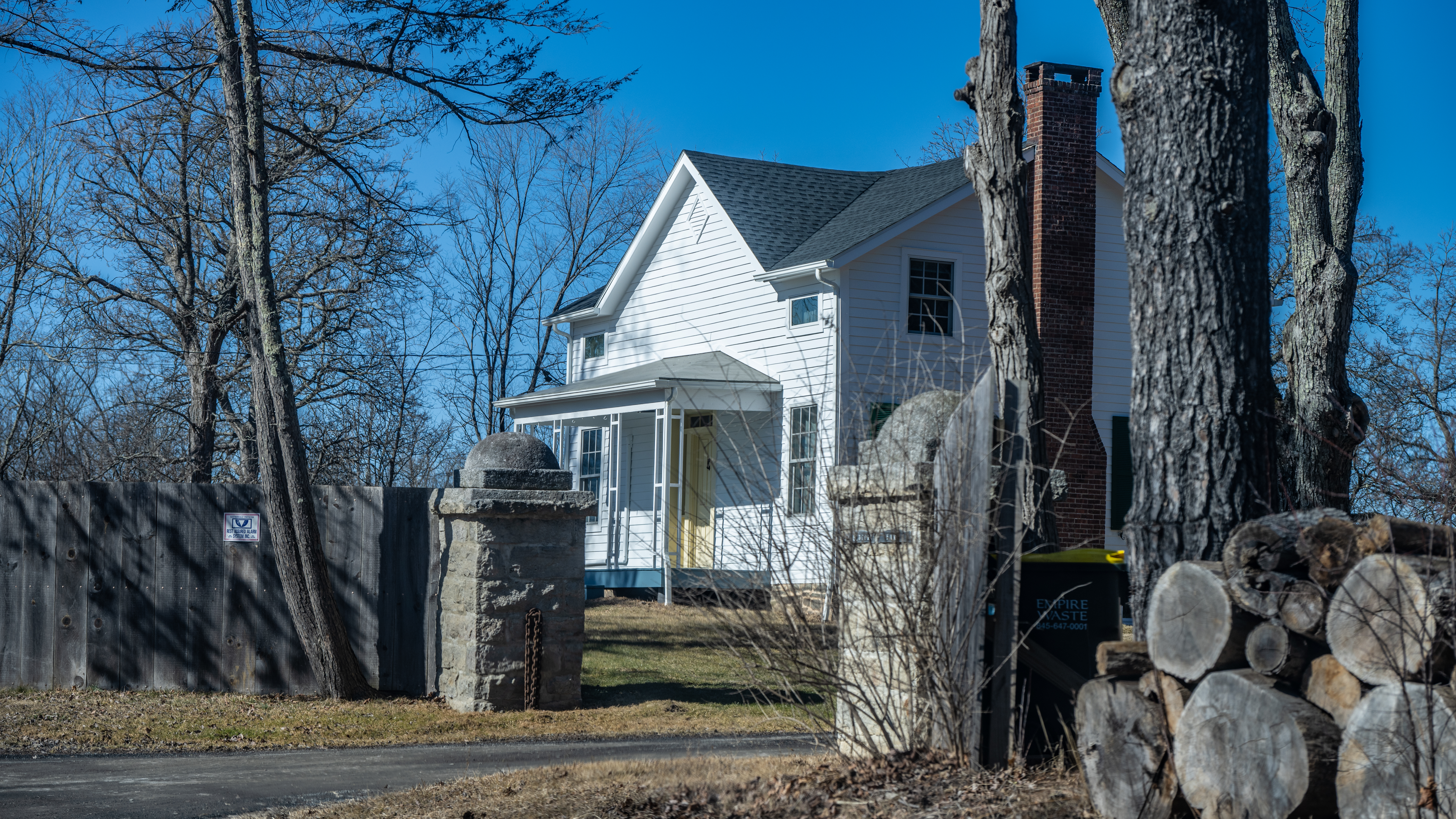
- The farmhouse in March, 2025.

- Location within New York Location within the United States
- Location: 4938 US 209, Accord, New York
- Coordinates: 41°47′47″N 74°12′56″W
- Area: 139.44 acres (56.43 ha)
- Built: c. 1758-1937
- Architect: Teller, Myron S., Teller & Haverson
- Architectural style: Dutch Colonial, Colonial Revival
- MPS: Historic & Architectural Resources of the Town of Rochester MPS
- NRHP reference No.: 13000099
- Added to NRHP: March 20, 2013

Appeldoorn Farm is a historic home and farm and national historic district located at Accord, Ulster County, New York. The farmstead was established in 1722, and restored and redeveloped as a Colonial Revival country retreat in 1930–1937. It includes a 1 1/2-story, Dutch Colonial period stone house built about 1758, and expanded in the 19th century and restored in 1930. It has a side gable roof and interior gable end chimneys. Also on the property are the contributing barn (c. 1905), poultry house, farm worker cottage (c. 1905), garage and workhouse (1937), game house (1937), 1 1/2-story tenant house (c. 1851), gate posts (1937), Henry DeWitt cellar hole, and an airport (1937).

It was listed on the National Register of Historic Places in 2013.
