= Hornbeck Stone House =

Historic house in New York, United States

- U.S. National Register of Historic Places
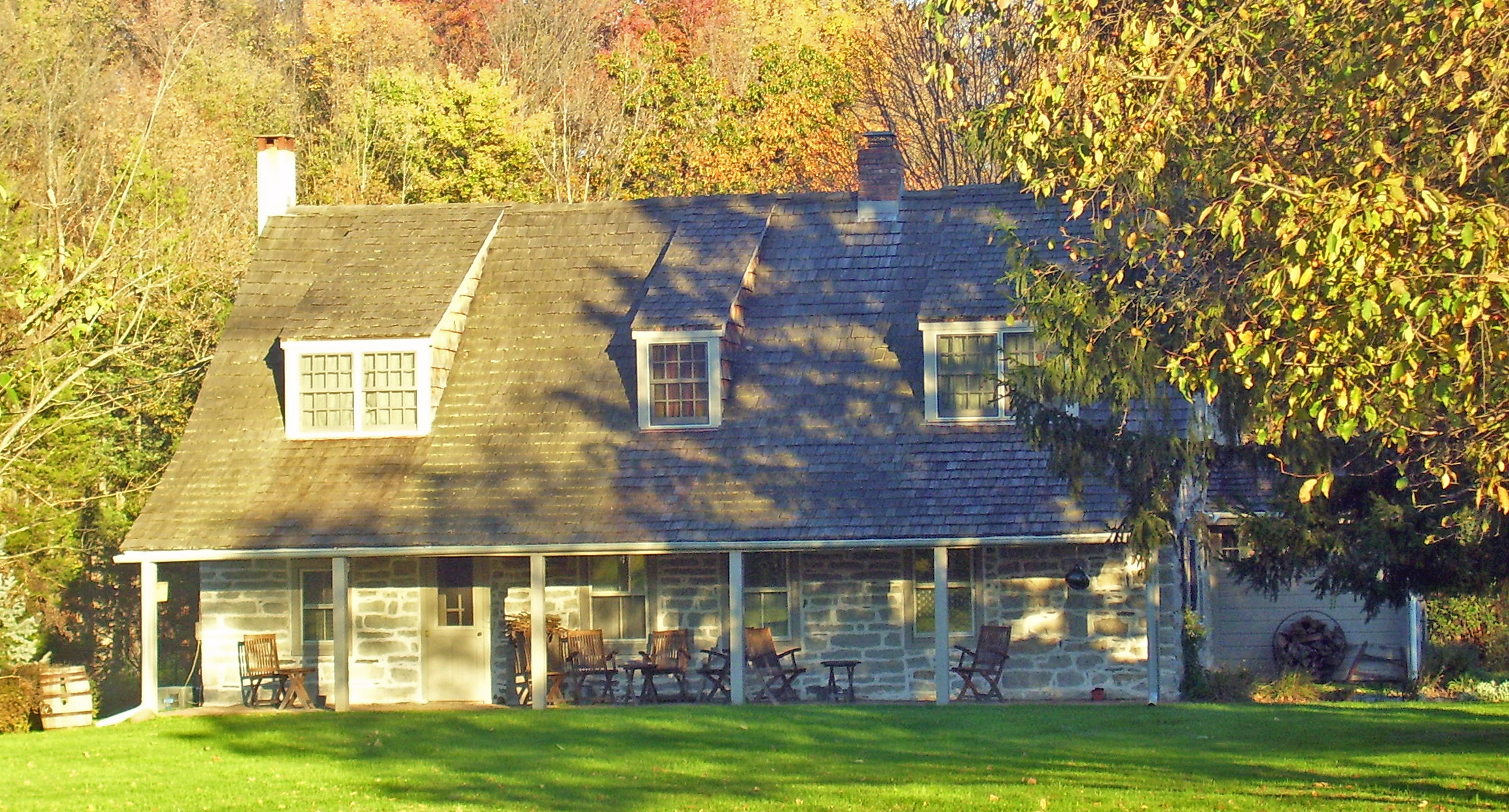
- West elevation, 2008

- Location within New York Location within the United States
- Location: Kerhonkson, NY
- Coordinates: 41°49′1″N 74°13′19″W
- Area: 11.3 acres (4.6 ha)
- Built: 1750
- MPS: Rochester MPS
- NRHP reference No.: 95000957
- Added to NRHP: August 10, 1995

The Hornbeck Stone House is a historic home located on Whitfield Road near the hamlet of Kerhonkson, New York, United States, in the Town of Rochester in Ulster County, New York. It was built in two sections in the mid-18th century.

Its appearance has been slightly altered since its construction, but it retains the integrity of its original design. In 1999 it and several outbuildings were listed on the National Register of Historic Places.

== Building ==
The house is on an irregularly shaped 11.3-acre (4.6 ha) lot on the east side of Whitfield Road almost two miles (3.2 km) north of the US 209 highway. The lot is bisected by the North Peterskill, a tributary of Rondout Creek. It is wooded, giving way to small fields in surrounding areas. Other land in the area is used for farming or similar large residential lots, with the exception of the high ground of Whitfield Cemetery to the northeast.

There are four buildings on the property, a chicken coop, garage and shed in addition to the house. All besides the house are not considered contributing to its historic character. Its main block is a one-and-a-half-story five-bay rectangular stone structure topped by a steeply pitched gable roof pierced by two chimneys and three shed-roofed dormers. A small one-story wing projects from the south.

Full-width shed-roofed porches supported by wooden square pillars run the length of the west (front) elevation and the east. The main entrance is off-center, located on the second northern bay between two-over-two double-hung sash windows. A secondary entrance is located at the west corner of the south gable end. The shed dormers have a pair of eight-over-eight sash on the sides and a single one in the center.

== History ==
The house was built in two separate sections around 1750. The southern third came first; its intact exterior wall is still visible in the interior. When completed the house had one single shed dormer with three windows in the middle of the west elevation; late 20th-century renovations created the current configuration. The southernmost front window was once a third entryway.

== See also ==
- National Register of Historic Places listings in Ulster County, New York
