= Rondout Valley High School =

Location
- P.O. Box 9, 122 Kyserike Rd; Accord, NY 12404; United States; 41.814986°N 74.188095°W

Information
- Other name: RVHS
- Type: Public, Secular
- Principal: Jessica Torok
- Faculty: 64.90 (FTE)
- Grades: 9–12
- Gender: coeducational
- Enrollment: 648 (2019-2020)
- Student to teacher ratio: 10.53
- Colors: Royal Blue and White
- Mascot: Ganders
- Website: rvhs.rondout.k12.ny.us

Rondout Valley High School (RVHS) is a public high school located in Accord, New York, United States. Operated by the Rondout Valley School District, the school serves 9th through 12th graders from Marbletown, Rosendale, and Kerhonkson. The high school, which shares its campus with Rondout Valley Middle School, was constructed in 1959. Prior to its opening, high school students in the area attended Kerhonkson High School (now Kerhonkson Elementary School).

== Administration ==
The principal is Jessica Torok.

The assistant principals are Richard VanScoyk and Thomas Martelli

== Academics ==
As a public high school in New York, RVHS subscribes to the state regents board for its academic standards. In addition to the standard regents track, the school has an honors program and a special education program. RVHS offers eleven advanced placement (AP) courses in American government and politics, biology, calculus, chemistry, comparative government and politics, English, European history, French, music theory, physics, Spanish, and US History.

=== WISE ===
Wise Individualized Senior Experience (WISE) is a program available to seniors in their final semester. In this program, students pursue a project of their own interest as a substitute for two classes. They keep a journal of their progress on their project, and at the end of the year, present their work to evaluators, friends, and other interested students. Projects have included: putting a music program together, starting and managing an a cappella group, building a boat, creating a website, teaching foreign languages to younger students, building a computer, filming a movie, culinary exploration, dance choreography, senior book, creating a community mural, social action, and writing a comic book. The WISE program is run by Rebecca Abi-Hassan.

=== New Visions ===
New Visions is another program available to seniors in their final semester. In this program, the student's English and history requirements are waived and half of the school day is devoted to distance learning. One day out of the week New Visions students take either college English or political science. On the remaining four days the students take part in an internship in their New Visions field. New Visions offers the chance to work first hand in education, health, performing and visual arts, and communications/journalism. Student are also required to participate in projects pertaining to the New Visions program chosen and keep a daily journal logging the events of their internship.

== Music ==
Classes in music theory and introduction to music are taught, as well as lessons for students in the concert band and concert choir. In 2012 the concert choir was given a master class with opera singers Maria Todaro and Louis Otey in which selected students sang and received input into the music on which they were working.

RVHS has a choir, a concert band, a jazz band, and a vocal jazz ensemble. The music department presents a concert series each year to demonstrate student learning. There are two concerts with the concert band and concert choir and two jazz concerts. The concert band is also part of the district band concert, which includes the 5/6, 7/8 and RVHS bands.

The school's music program has collaborated with musicians such as Roswell Rudd, with the choir and jazz band performing with Roswell and his trombone shout band. The concert band commissioned and performed the world premiere of "Sinfonia Brevis" by Sean Doyle in 2008. In 2012 the concert band joined forces with The Ulster County Community Band in a program titled "Music for the Ages".

The Vocal Jazz Ensemble was invited to The LeMoyne Jazz Festival for three consecutive years, from 2011 to 2013. The music department sends students to the NYSSMA (New York State School Music Association) Solo festival. Due to this, Rondout sends students to the NYSSMA All-County, Area All-State, and Conference All-State festivals annually.

Students from the Rondout Valley Music Department have been known to move on to such music programs as Ithaca College, The Crane School of Music, and SUNY Fredonia.

== RVTV ==
Rondout has previously attempted to migrate from loudspeaker announcements to video announcements through their video production club RVTV. In 2005, video announcements were first attempted but did not last. In the 2011/12 school year, Rondout had its first team of RVTV reporters, correspondents, cameramen, and editors. RVTV is now a fully defunct broadcasting tool; instead the school uses loudspeaker announcements as well as updates on their official webpage.

== School mascot ==
The mascot for RVHS is a gander, referred to as "Gary the Gander”.

== Athletics ==
The Ganders athletic teams participate in New York State's Section 9 athletics. The school competes in baseball, basketball, lacrosse, softball, field hockey, football, softball, track and field, wrestling, cross country, golf, and volleyball.
