= Joachim Schoonmaker Farm =

Historic farm in New York

- U.S. National Register of Historic Places
- U.S. Historic district
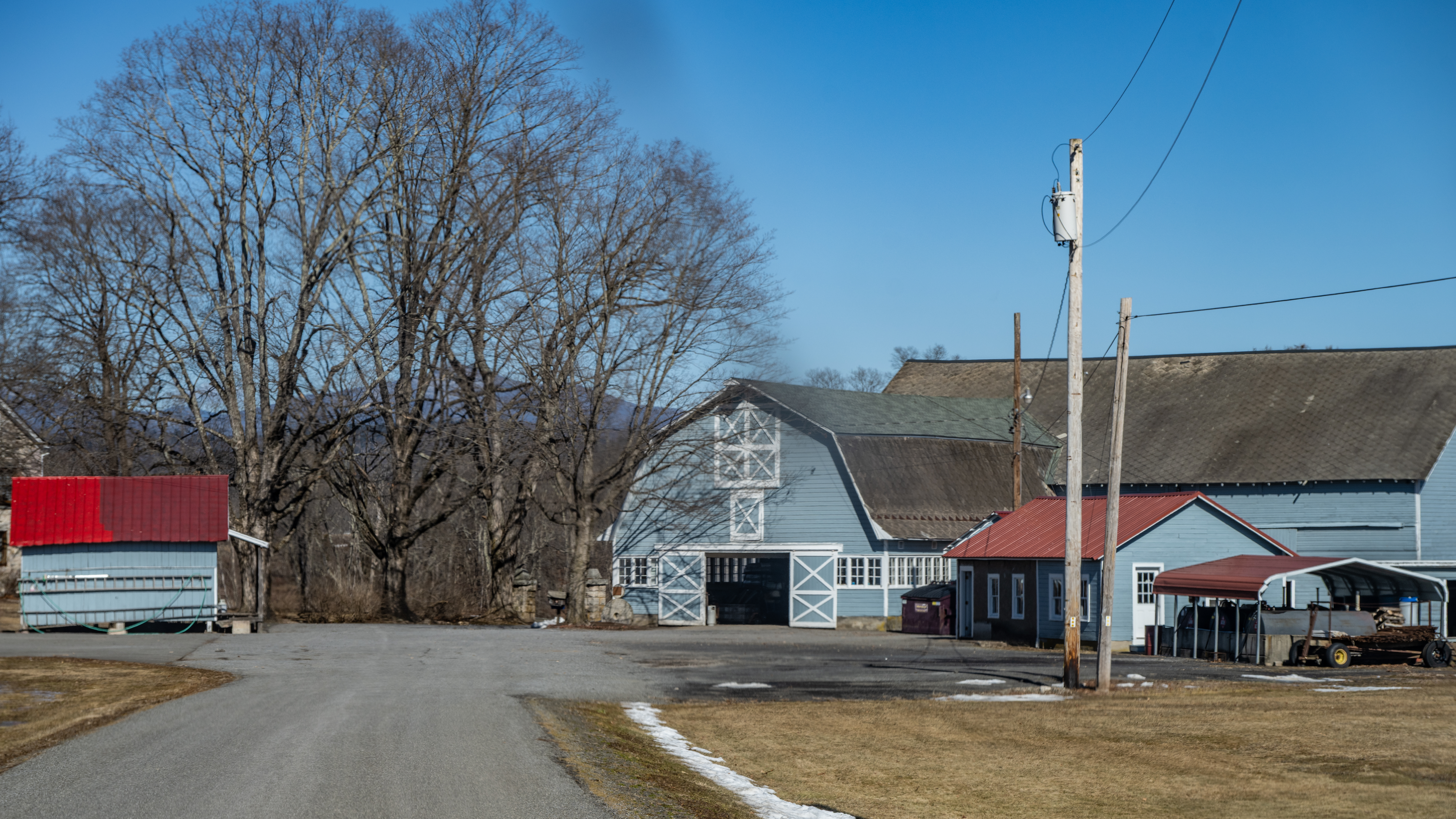
- The farm in March, 2025.

- Location within New York Location within the United States
- Location: 41 Garden Ln., Accord, New York
- Coordinates: 41°47′08″N 74°12′48″W
- Area: 307.61 acres (124.49 ha)
- Built: c. 1787-1963
- MPS: Historic & Architectural Resources of the Town of Rochester MPS
- NRHP reference No.: 13000244
- Added to NRHP: May 8, 2013

Joachim Schoonmaker Farm, also known as Saunderskill Farm, is a historic home and farm and national historic district located at Accord, Ulster County, New York. The farmstead was established about 300 years ago and has been owned by the same family since then. It includes a two-story, five-bay, brick-fronted stone house built in 1787 with two rear frame wings. It has a side gable roof and interior gable end chimneys. Also on the property are the contributing stone smokehouse, 1 1/2-story wagon house, wood frame smokehouse, granary, barn (c. 1870, 1929), powerhouse (c. 1900), two poultry houses, a section of the Delaware and Hudson Canal (1828), a two-story wood-frame house (1929), and a 1 1/2-story tenant house.

It was listed on the National Register of Historic Places in 2013.
