= Common School No. 10 =

- U.S. National Register of Historic Places
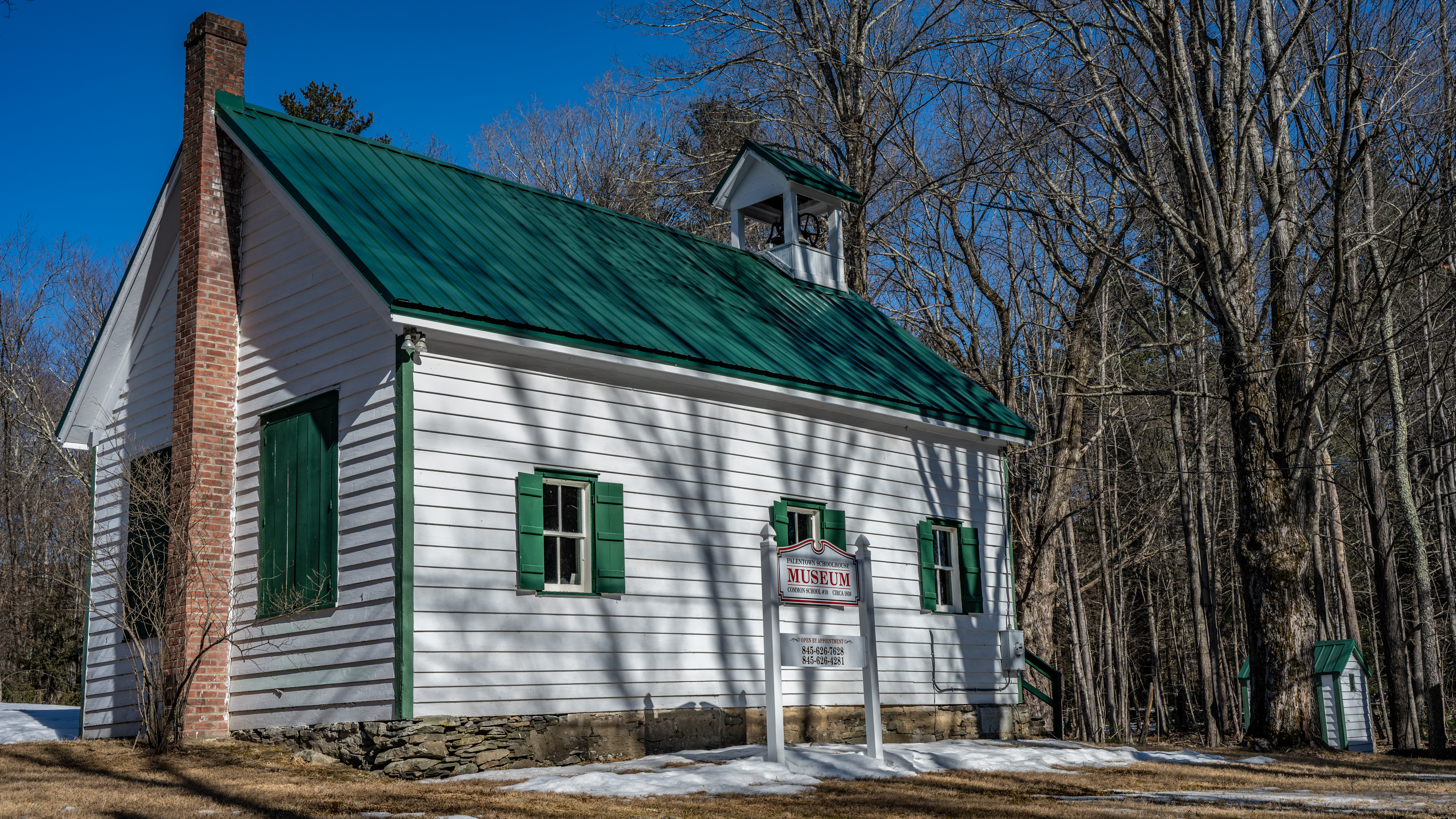
- Common School No. 10 in 2025

- Location within New York Location within the United States
- Nearest city: Accord, New York
- Coordinates: 41°52′47″N 74°19′18″W
- Area: 0.3 acres (0.12 ha)
- Built: 1870
- Architect: Dymond, Horace
- NRHP reference No.: 88001439
- Added to NRHP: September 15, 1988

Common School No. 10 is a historic one-room school building located in Accord in Ulster County, New York. It is a 1-story, two-by-three-bay, frame building on a fieldstone foundation built about 1870. It is topped by a gable roof with an open belfry. It operated as a school until 1955. Also on the property is a privy, shed, and well with hand pump.

It was listed on the National Register of Historic Places in 1988.

Now known as Palentown School House Museum, the school is open twice a year and by appointment.
