= Henry C. Middaugh House =

Historic house in Illinois, United States

- Formerly listed on the U.S. National Register of Historic Places
- Location within Illinois Location within the United States
- Location: 66 Norfolk Ave; Clarendon Hills, DuPage County, Illinois, U.S.
- Coordinates: 41°48′7″N 87°57′1″W
- Architectural style: Queen Anne
- NRHP reference No.: 78003105

Significant dates
- Added to NRHP: September 21, 1978
- Removed from NRHP: August 14, 2004

The Henry C. Middaugh House was a historic residence in Clarendon Hills, Illinois. The Queen Anne residence was built on the north side of the Chicago, Burlington and Quincy Railroad railroad station before Clarendon Hills was even platted. It was added to the National Register of Historic Places in 1978. However, a Catholic church purchased the property in 2002 so that it could expand, and the house was demolished shortly thereafter.

== History ==
Henry C. Middaugh was a Chicago banker who purchased 270 acres (1.1 km^{2}) in the Village of Clarendon Hills in 1869. The land was just north of the Chicago, Burlington and Quincy Railroad. When Clarendon Hills was platted in 1873, Middaugh was acknowledged as one of the first residents. He later served as DuPage School Director and was a member of the DuPage County Board of Supervisors. Aside from his banking ventures, Middaugh made his fortune by producing lumber and sash window frames.

His brick house was two-and-a-half stories tall on a stone foundation. The Queen Anne style house featured a tower, typical of Queen Anne houses of the time. A square porch in the front had elements of Romanesque Revival. The only major alteration occurred in the 1930s, when a second porch was added when the house functioned as a senior citizens. The house featured twenty rooms with hardwood floors. The main hall had a carved, winding staircase to the second floor. The dining room had a small, simple fireplace of mosaic tile. A dumbwaiter could carry food and drink to the upper floors. The third floor was used as a ballroom with a door to the tower, allowing a view of the property. The house was added to the National Register of Historic Places on September 21, 1978.

Middaugh's property was, at some point, sold to the Sisters of Christian Charity. This piece of property was sold in 1953 so that Bishop Martin McNamara could build the Notre Dame Church to serve the needs of the growing Catholic community in Clarendon Hills. They intended to build an expansion to the church that would require the destruction of the historic house. The Henry C. Middaugh House was demolished in June 2002 and removed from the National Register of Historic Places on August 14, 2004.
