= Krom Stone House and Dutch Barn =

Historic house in New York, United States

- U.S. National Register of Historic Places
- Location within New York Location within the United States
- Location: Airport Rd., Rochester, New York
- Coordinates: 41°49′1″N 74°12′35″W
- Area: 100 acres (40 ha)
- Built: 1730
- MPS: Rochester MPS
- NRHP reference No.: 95000955
- Added to NRHP: August 10, 1995

Krom Stone House and Dutch Barn is a historic home and Dutch barn located at Rochester in Ulster County, New York. The property includes the stone house (ca. 1730), Dutch barn (ca. 1800), and shed (ca. 1870). The main block of the house is a 1 1/2-story stone dwelling in a linear plan. In 1966, the stone was covered in stucco.

It was listed on the National Register of Historic Places in 1999.
