= Clarendon Hills, Illinois =

- Village
- Village of Clarendon Hills
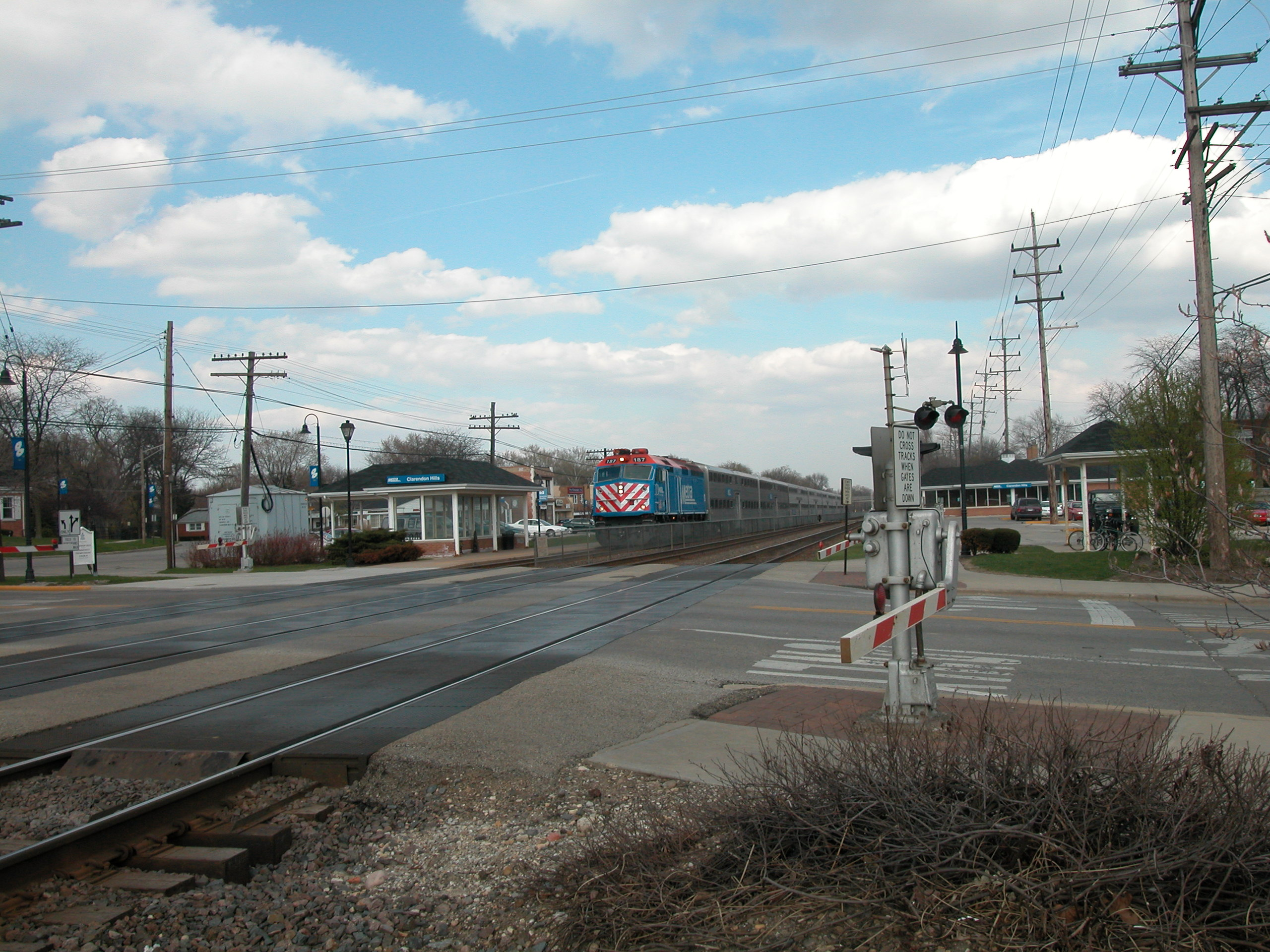
- Clarendon Hills Station in 2004
- Nickname: The Volunteer Village
- Location of Clarendon Hills in DuPage County, Illinois.
- Coordinates: 41°47′53″N 87°57′25″W
- Country: United States
- State: Illinois
- County: DuPage
- Township: Downers Grove
- Incorporated: 1924
- Founded by: Henry Middaugh

Government
  - Type: Council–manager

Area
  - Total: 1.82 sq mi (4.71 km^{2})
  - Land: 1.81 sq mi (4.69 km^{2})
  - Water: 0.012 sq mi (0.03 km^{2}) 0.55%
- Elevation: 738 ft (225 m)

Population (2020)
  - Total: 8,702
  - Density: 4,810/sq mi (1,856/km^{2})
- Time zone: UTC-6 (CST)
  - Summer (DST): UTC-5 (CDT)
- ZIP code: 60514
- North American Numbering Plan: 630, 331
- FIPS code: 17-14572
- GNIS feature ID: 2397629
- Website: www.clarendonhills.us

Clarendon Hills is a village in DuPage County, Illinois, United States. The population was 8,702 at the 2020 census. It is a south-west suburb of Chicago.

== History ==
The area that is now Clarendon Hills was a wide, rolling prairie bordering the east side of Westmont. Most of the older villages in Downers Grove Township were built on the same street grid as the Village of Downers Grove. Instead, Clarendon Hills was built to resemble nearby Riverside, a planned, park-like suburb designed by Fredrick Law Olmsted in the late 1800s. Its long winding streets go with the natural contour of the land, rather than extending straight through from the neighboring towns. In 1923, at the time of incorporation, Clarendon Hills had a population of under 900 people. The area was incorporated to avoid annexation by the nearby community of Hinsdale.

The Clarendon Hills Historical Society is tasked with retaining the town's history and establishing a community center and a museum to display prominent artifacts about the history of the village.

In 1961, TWA Flight 529 crashed south of Clarendon Hills, killing all 73 passengers on board.

On May 11, 2022, a Metra train collided with a stalled box truck on the Prospect Avenue grade crossing west of Clarendon Hills station; one person lost her life.

== Geography ==
Clarendon Hills is approximately 18 miles southwest of Chicago.

According to the 2021 census gazetteer files, Clarendon Hills has a total area of 1.82 square miles (4.71 km^{2}), of which 1.81 square miles (4.69 km^{2}) (or 99.45%) is land and 0.01 square miles (0.03 km^{2}) (or 0.55%) is water.

Climate data for Clarendon Hills, Illinois
Month	Jan	Feb	Mar	Apr	May	Jun	Jul	Aug	Sep	Oct	Nov	Dec	Year
Record high °F (°C)	65 (18)	71 (22)	88 (31)	91 (33)	93 (34)	104 (40)	102 (39)	100 (38)	99 (37)	91 (33)	78 (26)	71 (22)	104 (40)
Mean daily maximum °F (°C)	31 (−1)	35 (2)	47 (8)	59 (15)	70 (21)	80 (27)	83 (28)	82 (28)	75 (24)	63 (17)	49 (9)	36 (2)	59 (15)
Mean daily minimum °F (°C)	16 (−9)	18 (−8)	28 (−2)	38 (3)	49 (9)	59 (15)	63 (17)	62 (17)	54 (12)	43 (6)	32 (0)	21 (−6)	40 (4)
Record low °F (°C)	−27 (−33)	−17 (−27)	−8 (−22)	7 (−14)	24 (−4)	36 (2)	40 (4)	41 (5)	28 (−2)	17 (−8)	1 (−17)	−25 (−32)	−27 (−33)
Average precipitation inches (mm)	2.07 (53)	1.76 (45)	2.44 (62)	3.78 (96)	4.39 (112)	4.61 (117)	4.15 (105)	4.03 (102)	3.31 (84)	3.30 (84)	2.60 (66)	2.20 (56)	38.64 (981)
Average snowfall inches (cm)	11.0 (28)	8.0 (20)	7.0 (18)	2.0 (5.1)	0 (0)	0 (0)	0 (0)	0 (0)	0 (0)	0.1 (0.25)	2.0 (5.1)	9.0 (23)	39.1 (99)

== Demographics ==
Historical population
Census	Pop.	Note	%±
1880	69		—
1930	933		—
1940	1,281		37.3%
1950	2,437		90.2%
1960	5,885		141.5%
1970	6,750		14.7%
1980	6,870		1.8%
1990	6,994		1.8%
2000	7,610		8.8%
2010	8,427		10.7%
2020	8,702		3.3%
U.S. Decennial Census

=== 2020 census ===
As of the 2020 census, Clarendon Hills had a population of 8,702. The median age was 40.8 years. 28.4% of residents were under the age of 18 and 14.7% of residents were 65 years of age or older. For every 100 females there were 92.3 males, and for every 100 females age 18 and over there were 88.4 males age 18 and over.

The population density was 4,781 inhabitants per square mile (1,846/km^{2}). There were 3,396 housing units at an average density of 1,866 per square mile (720/km^{2}).

100.0% of residents lived in urban areas, while 0.0% lived in rural areas.

There were 3,170 households in Clarendon Hills, of which 40.0% had children under the age of 18 living in them. Of all households, 60.4% were married-couple households, 13.6% were households with a male householder and no spouse or partner present, and 23.3% were households with a female householder and no spouse or partner present. About 24.0% of all households were made up of individuals and 10.7% had someone living alone who was 65 years of age or older.

Of the housing units, 6.7% were vacant. The homeowner vacancy rate was 1.8% and the rental vacancy rate was 11.0%.

Racial composition as of the 2020 census
Race	Number	Percent
White	7,019	80.7%
Black or African American	128	1.5%
American Indian and Alaska Native	10	0.1%
Asian	737	8.5%
Native Hawaiian and Other Pacific Islander	0	0.0%
Some other race	156	1.8%
Two or more races	652	7.5%
Hispanic or Latino (of any race)	519	6.0%

=== Income and poverty ===
The median household income in the village was $103,486, and the median family income was $175,801. Males had a median income of $117,564 versus $41,888 for females. The per capita income for the village was $67,540. About 11.0% of families and 8.6% of the population were below the poverty line, including 6.8% of those under age 18 and 1.5% of those age 65 or over.

== Transportation ==
Clarendon Hills has a station on Metra's BNSF Line, which provides daily rail service between Aurora, Illinois and Chicago, Illinois (at Union Station). Additionally, Pace operates connecting bus services. Currently, bus lines 663 and 664 serve Clarendon Hills.

== Schools ==
Clarendon Hills is a part of Community Consolidated School District 181, with Clarendon Hills Middle School (grades 6–8), Prospect School (grades K-5), and Walker School (grades K-5). The school superintendent is Dr. Don White. Notre Dame Parish School (grades PK-8) is also located in the village. Parts of Clarendon Hills are also located within Maercker District 60, with Holmes School (grades K-2), Maercker School (grades 3–6), and Westview Hills Middle School (grades 6–8).

Clarendon Hills Middle School (CHMS) is one of the two 6-8th-grade schools in District 181. It is one of 5 public middle schools feeding into Hinsdale Central High School. Approximately 700 students were enrolled in CHMS for the 2009–10 school year. CHMS was recently ranked by the Chicago Tribune as the 14th best middle school in the state (based on ISAT scores). More than 96% of the students' test scores were categorized as meeting or exceeding the Illinois Learning Standards.

In 2009, the Clarendon Hills Middle School was awarded a Blue Ribbon by the United States Department of Education, recognizing it as one of the top schools in the nation. CHMS is ranked in the top 2% of middle schools in Illinois.

Prospect School had an approximate enrollment of 449 students for the 2009–10 school year. Walker School had an approximate enrollment of 305 students for the 2009–10 school year. Together with CHMS, all are rated 10 out of 10 by GreatSchools.

== Notable people ==
- Bill Evans, jazz musician
- Emily Harris, Symbionese Liberation Army member
- Bill Laimbeer, basketball center with 1989-1990 NBA Champion Detroit Pistons
- Ben Murphy, actor
- Brian Wardle, basketball head coach, Bradley University
