= Accord, New York =

Hamlet in the state of New York, United States

- CDP
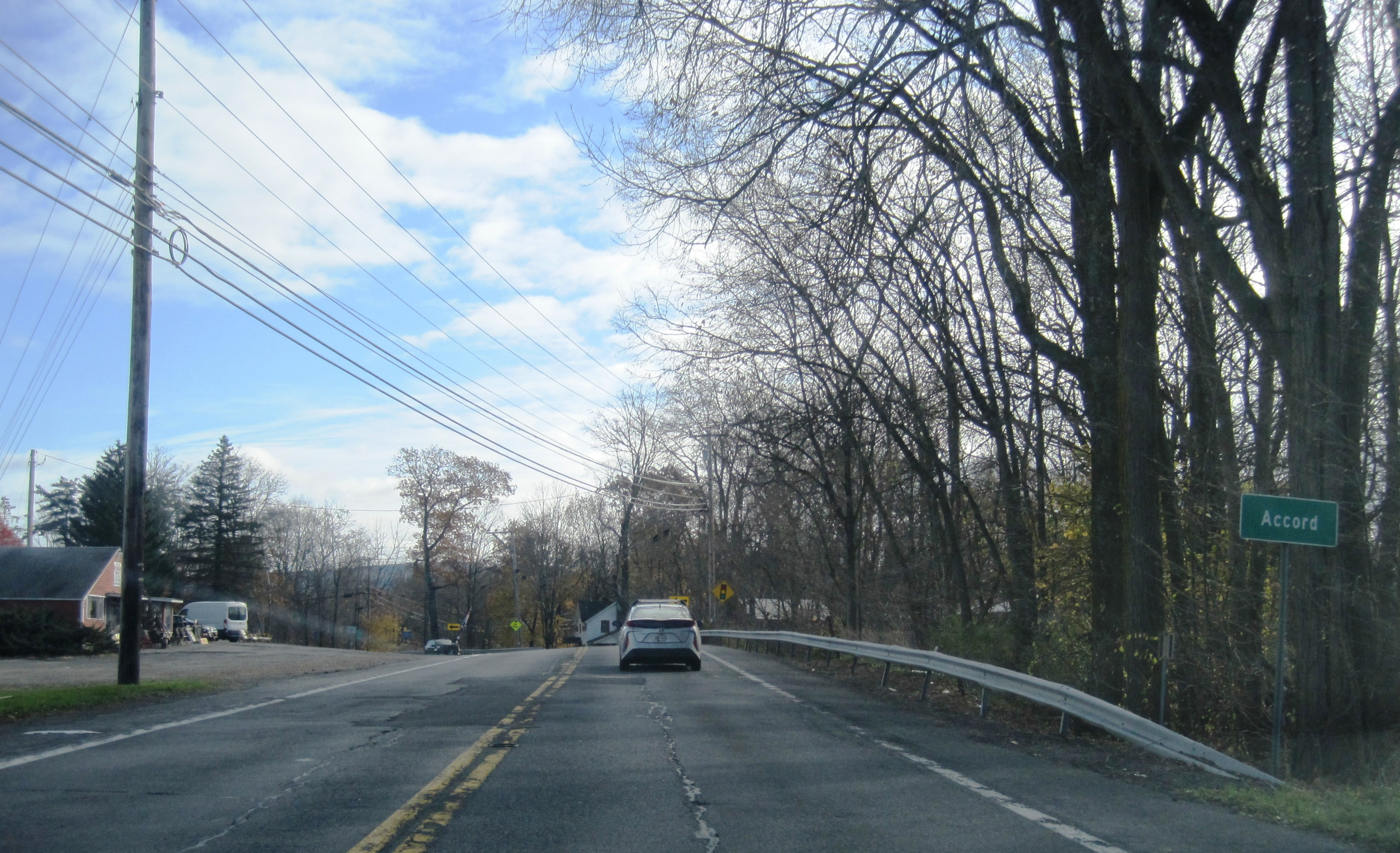
- Entering Accord along northbound US 209

- Location in Ulster County and the state of New York.
- Coordinates: 41°47′28″N 74°13′44″W
- Country: United States
- State: New York
- County: Ulster

Area
  - Total: 3.44 sq mi (8.92 km^{2})
  - Land: 3.40 sq mi (8.81 km^{2})
  - Water: 0.042 sq mi (0.11 km^{2})
- Elevation: 253 ft (77 m)

Population (2020)
  - Total: 573
  - Density: 168.5/sq mi (65.06/km^{2})
- Time zone: UTC-5 (Eastern (EST))
  - Summer (DST): UTC-4 (EDT)
- ZIP code: 12404
- Area code: 845
- FIPS code: 36-00155
- GNIS feature ID: 0942147

Accord (/ˈækɔːrd/, ACK-ord) is a hamlet and census-designated place (CDP) in Ulster County, New York, United States. Accord is located in the eastern part of the Town of Rochester (not to be confused with the City of Rochester) along US 209. Accord is the seat of town government. As of the 2020 census the population is 573.

Accord is also the name associated with the U.S. Postal Service Zip Code 12404, which takes in a much larger portion of Rochester than the CDP.

== History ==
A Delaware and Hudson Canal town originally named Port Jackson, it is thought that the name "Accord" resulted from a petition of the townspeople to the Capitol in Albany for a new name. The response was that the authorities could not come to an accord about a new name so the name "Accord" was chosen. The local pronunciation of this word is (uh-cord)

Appeldoorn Farm, Common School No. 10, and Joachim Schoonmaker Farm, in rural areas near the hamlet, are listed on the National Register of Historic Places. An application to list most of the hamlet on the Register as the Accord Historic District was filed with the U.S. National Park Service in December 2019; the next month it was approved and the district was listed.

== Geography ==
Accord is located at 41°47′27″N 74°13′43″W (41.791103, -74.228766).

According to the United States Census Bureau, the CDP has a total area of 3.4 square miles (8.8 km^{2}), of which 3.4 square miles (8.8 km^{2}) is land and 0.1 square miles (0.26 km^{2}) (1.45%) is water.

== Demographics ==
Historical population
Census	Pop.	Note	%±
2000	622		—
2010	562		−9.6%
2020	573		2.0%
U.S. Decennial Census

As of the census of 2000, there were 622 people, 226 households, and 157 families residing in the CDP. The population density was 183.6 inhabitants per square mile (70.9/km^{2}). There were 256 housing units at an average density of 75.6 per square mile (29.2/km^{2}). The racial makeup of the CDP was 92.44% White, 2.41% African American, 0.80% Native American, 1.45% Asian, 0.16% from other races, and 2.73% from two or more races. Hispanic or Latino of any race were 3.86% of the population.

There were 226 households, out of which 40.3% had children under the age of 18 living with them, 49.6% were married couples living together, 14.6% had a female householder with no husband present, and 30.1% were non-families. 23.9% of all households were made up of individuals, and 8.8% had someone living alone who was 65 years of age or older. The average household size was 2.73 and the average family size was 3.23.

In the CDP, the population was spread out, with 30.1% under the age of 18, 7.7% from 18 to 24, 30.4% from 25 to 44, 22.8% from 45 to 64, and 9.0% who were 65 years of age or older. The median age was 34 years. For every 100 females, there were 93.8 males. For every 100 females age 18 and over, there were 87.5 males.

The median income for a household in the CDP was $52,083, and the median income for a family was $48,542. Males had a median income of $25,368 versus $35,455 for females. The per capita income for the CDP was $26,672. About 5.5% of families and 4.1% of the population were below the poverty line, including 2.2% of those under age 18 and 24.5% of those age 65 or over.

The population of the Accord CDP had fallen to 562 at the 2010 census.

== Education ==
The CDP is in Rondout Valley Central School District.

== Notable person ==
- Paul Austin Kelly, opera singer
- Gary Hume, artist
