= Middaugh-Stone House and Dutch Barn =

Historic house in New York, United States

- U.S. National Register of Historic Places
- Location within New York Location within the United States
- Location: 476 Mill Hook Rd., Rochester, New York
- Coordinates: 41°49′9″N 74°13′49″W
- Area: 51.3 acres (20.8 ha)
- Built: 1771
- NRHP reference No.: 94001514
- Added to NRHP: December 29, 1994

Middaugh-Stone House and Dutch Barn is a historic home and Dutch barn located at Rochester in Ulster County, New York. The property includes the stone house (c. 1771), Dutch barn (c. 1790), horse barn (c. 1880), granary (c. 1880), and hoop shop (c. 1890). Also on the property is a well house (c. 1890) and two family burying grounds. These families include the Krom, Middaugh, Osterhoudt, and Quick families. The house is a 1 1/2-story, rectangular three-by-two-bay stone dwelling with a 1 1/2-story frame rear wing.

It was listed on the National Register of Historic Places in 1994.
