= Kerhonkson, New York =

Kerhonkson Formerly known as Middleport
- hamlet and CDP
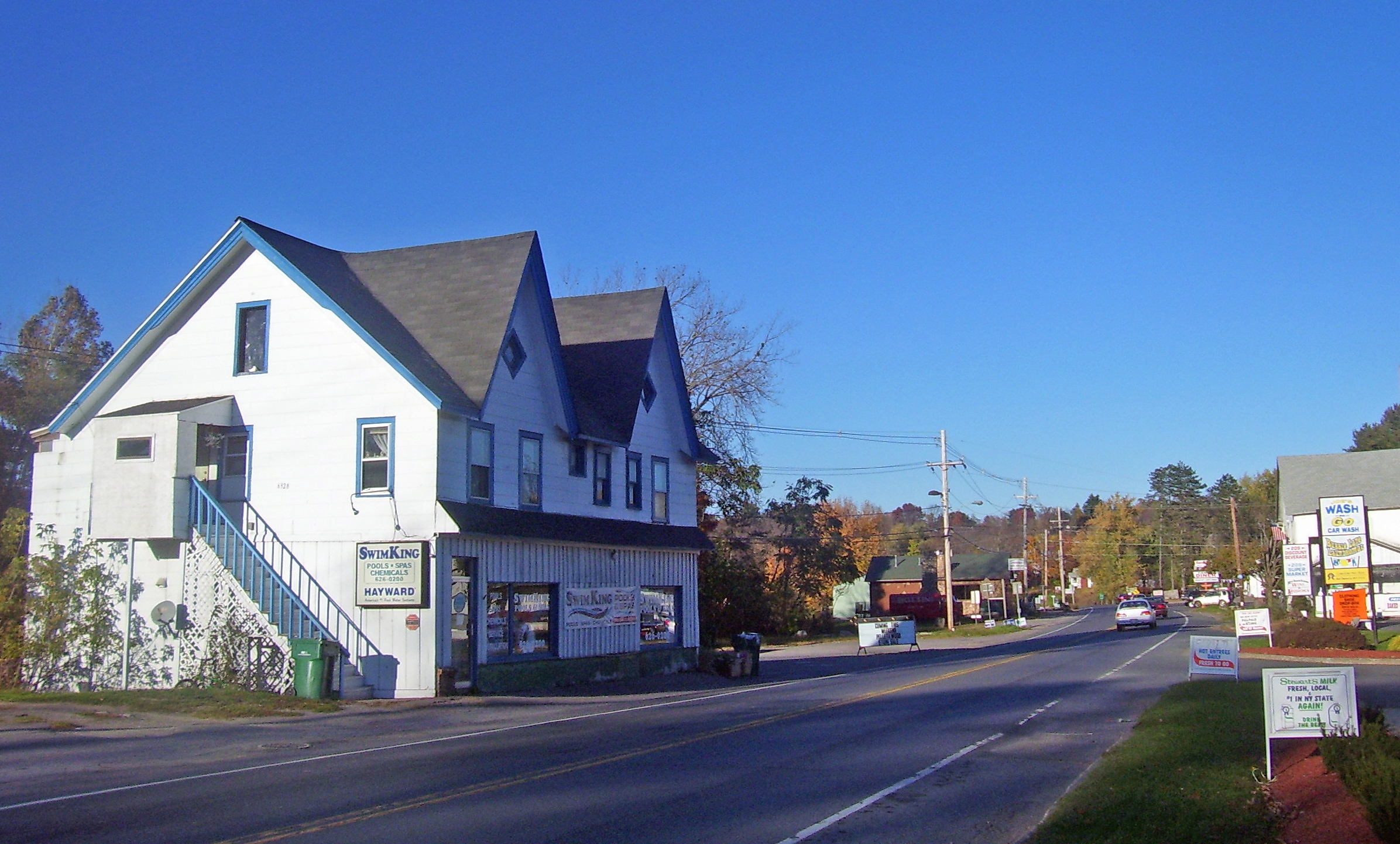
- Center of town along Route 209
- Nicknames: K-Town; Kerhamptons
- Location in Ulster County and the state of New York.
- Coordinates: 41°46′28″N 74°17′51″W
- Country: United States
- State: New York
- Region: Hudson Valley
- County: Ulster

Area
  - Total: 5.3 sq mi (13.7 km^{2})
- Elevation: 262 ft (80 m)

Population (2020)
  - Total: 1,722
  - Density: 325.5/sq mi (125.69/km^{2})
- Time zone: UTC-5 (EST)
  - Summer (DST): UTC-4 (EDT)
- Postal code: 12446
- Area code: 845
- FIPS code: 36-39397
- GNIS feature ID: 954549
- Website: www.townofrochester.net

Kerhonkson /kərˈhɒŋksən/ is a hamlet and census-designated place (CDP) in Ulster County, New York, United States. The population was 1,722 at the 2020 census.

The Kerhonkson CDP is an urban concentration that straddles the border of the town of Rochester and the town of Wawarsing, with the larger portion in Rochester. US 209 is the hamlet's main artery. The western terminus of US 44 / NY 55 is at Route 209 in the Wawarsing portion of the Kerhonkson CDP. The U.S. Postal Service Zip Code of Kerhonkson (12446) covers a much larger area of the town of Rochester, as well as part of Wawarsing and a small area of the town of Olive.

Soyuzivka, a Ukrainian resort and cultural center, is within the Kerhonkson Zip Code, in the town of Warwarsing.

== Geography ==
The Kerhonkson CDP is located at 41°46′28″N 74°17′51″W. with a total area of 5.3 square miles (14 km^{2}), all land. The CDP is in the valley of Rondout Creek, a tributary of the Hudson River, and adjacent to the Shawangunk Mountains, famous for the rock climbing and biodiversity of the Shawangunk Ridge.

The Minnewaska State Park Preserve is in the Kerhonkson Zip Code area, along Route 44/55.

== Demography ==
Historical population
Census	Pop.	Note	%±
2000	1,732		—
2010	1,684		−2.8%
2020	1,722		2.3%
U.S. Decennial Census

As of the census of 2010, there were 1,684 people, 684 households, and 433 families residing in the CDP. The population density was 317.7 inhabitants per square mile (122.7/km^{2}). There were 857 housing units at an average density of 161.7 units per square mile (62.4 units/km^{2}). The racial makeup of the CDP was 92.6% White, 1.8% African American, 0.7% Native American, 1.3% Asian, 0.1% Pacific Islander, 1.4% from other races, and 2.2% from two or more races. Hispanic or Latino of any race were 7.8% of the population.

There were 684 households, out of which 29.4% had children under the age of 18 living with them, 41.4% were married couples living together, 15.4% had a female householder with no spouse present, 6.6% had a male householder with no spouse present, and 36.7% were non-families. 29.7% of all households were made up of individuals, and 11.5% had someone living alone who was 65 years of age or older. The average household size was 2.46 and the average family size was 2.97.

In the CDP, the population was spread out, with 26.4% under the age of 19, 6.1% from 20 to 24, 25.5% from 25 to 44, 27.8% from 45 to 64, and 14.3% who were 65 years of age or older. The median age was 39.4 years. For every 100 females, there were 97.7 males. For every 100 females age 18 and over, there were 97.4 males.

As of 2016 the median income for a household in the CDP was $41,541 and the median income for a family was $53,423. The per capita income for the CDP was $17,964. As of 2000 6.4% of families and 10.2% of the population were below the poverty line, including 9.5% of those under age 18 and 9.2% of those age 65 or over. Males had a median income of $32,008 versus $24,412 for females.

== History ==
=== Colonial Era ===
Kerhonkson was the site of a colonial fort, on Deyo's Hill, that served settler-colonial interests.

Before the Burning of Kingston on October 12, 1777, all the important documents of the nascent New York state government and government officials were moved to Kerhonkson, remaining for two weeks until they were moved to Albany, making Kerhonkson briefly the capital of New York.

=== Canal Era ===
The Delaware and Hudson Canal was completed in 1828. This opened up local industries such as coal, lumber, dairy, and hotel. Barges towed by mules transported goods along Rondout Creek from Pennsylvania to the Hudson River. In the canal era, Kerhonkson was known as Middleport

=== Railroad Era ===
The Delaware and Oswego Railroad was constructed in 1909 along the old canal towpath and a station was constructed along Main Street to ship out dairy products. The Summitville to Kingston segment was acquired by the New York, Ontario and Western. In the line's waning years, passenger service was reduced to Sunday and holiday service, and summer only. The tracks were pulled up in 1957 once products were being moved by truck upstate. The path is now a popular local hiking and biking destination known as the Rail Trail. It is 3.5 miles long.

=== Peg Leg Bates ===
In 1951, the famed tap dancer Peg Leg Bates became the first African-American resort owner in the Catskills when he opened the Peg Leg Bates Country Club in Palentown, a hamlet in the northern end of the Kerhonkson Zip Code. His wife Alice E. Bates died in 1987, and Bates leased the property to a new owner, Doreen Richardson, in 1989. Part of Route 209 in Ulster County was named “Clayton Peg Leg Bates Memorial Highway” in his honor.

Richardson operated the former Peg Leg Bates club as the "Mountain Valley Resort" until her death in 2012.

The Peg Leg Bates resort played an important role in the history of the civil rights movement in 1966 when a meeting of the Student Nonviolent Coordinating Committee (SNCC) held there voted to expel whites from its staff.

Rainbow Acres resort was open to African American customers.

== Religion ==
Congregation Tifereth Yehuda Veyisroel is the primary Jewish temple in the area. It was constructed in 1924. The community house also found on that property was constructed in 1954. In 2013 it was placed on the National Register of Historic Places.

The Federated Church of Kerhonkson is a Protestant church that is partially of the Methodist denomination and partially of the Reformed denomination. The church has a food pantry ("Christ's Cupboard"), a thrift shop, and a pet food pantry.

Holy Trinity Ukrainian Catholic Church is located on Foordmore Road. The parish is part of the Ukrainian Catholic Eparchy of Stamford.

The Chapel of Our Lady of Lourdes on Route 209 in Kerhonkson is a Catholic mission associated with the parish of St. Mary and St. Andrew in Ellenville.

== Local sports ==
Kerhonkson has hosted a baseball Little League, Indian Valley Little League, since 1953. Indian Valley won the 2017 District 16 championship, defeating Rondout Valley Little League. More recently Indian Valley removed its longtime mascot, Chief Wahoo, from signs, shirts, hats, website, and Facebook for its racial insensitivity.

The local swim team, the Kerhonkson Barracudas, are based out of the Kerhonkson Elementary School pool and compete against other local teams in the summer.

== Local services ==
The Kerhonkson Fire Department is on Main Street near where the railroad used to be. It has a social hall that holds meetings of local organizations, dinners, and parties.

The Kerhonkson-Accord Volunteer Ambulance Corp is along Route 209 and provides first aid service for both Kerhonkson and Accord.

== Education ==
The CDP is in Rondout Valley Central School District. Kerhonkson Elementary School is one of two elementary schools in the Rondout Valley Central School District. Kerhonkson is served by Rondout Valley High School in Accord, New York.

== Notable inhabitants ==
- Edward Aldwell - music theorist, pianist, and pedagogue
- Peg Leg Bates - entertainer
- Noel King - broadcast journalist, formerly with NPR's Morning Edition
- Herb Trimpe - Marvel comics artist, author
- Roswell Rudd - jazz musician and composer

== World records ==
Kerhonkson contains what was once the world's largest garden gnome, constructed in 2005; it is situated on Route 209 in front of Kelder's Farm and is named Gnome Chomsky. There are two other, larger gnomes that now hold the distinction of being the world's largest.
